= Sing Tao =

Sing Tao may refer to:

- Sing Tao Daily, a newspaper published in Hong Kong and overseas
- Sing Tao News Corporation, a company in Hong Kong that publishes Sing Tao Daily and other newspapers
- Sing Tao Holdings, a previous owner of the Sing Tao group of newspapers
- Sing Tao SC, a Hong Kong football club owned by Sing Tao Holdings, active 1940–1999
- Sing Tao Chinese Radio, the radio division of the Sing Tao News Corporation in the San Francisco Bay Area
- Sing Tao Daily (Canada), a newspaper based in Toronto

== See also ==
- Qingdao or Tsingtao, a city in Shandong Province, China
- Tsingtao Brewery
