= Sing Tao Holdings =

Hong Kong company

- Type: public company
- Traded as: SEHK: 233
- Industry: Media and property trading
- Predecessor: Sing Tao Limited
- Founded: 1951 (predecessor); 1986 (as listed company); 1989 (as Sing Tao Holdings)
Founder
| Aw Boon Haw | (predecessor) |
| Sally Aw | (Sing Tao Holdings) |
- Defunct: 2002
- Fate: main business sold to Global China Technology Group; property business renamed to Ming Yuan Holdings
- Successor: Sing Tao News Corporation; Mingyuan Medicare
Headquarters
| Hamilton, Bermuda | (registered office) |
| Kowloon Bay, Hong Kong | (de facto) |
- Area served: Hong Kong; overseas Chinese communities; Canada
- Key people: Kwok Ying-shing (chairman)
- Products: newspaper; printing and publishing; hotel
- Services: property trading; property investment; football club
Revenue
| ▼HK$ | 1.273 billion | (2000–01) |
| HK$ | 933 million | (2001) |
Net income
| ▼HK$ | (62 million) | (2000–01) |
| ▼HK$ | (66 million) | (2001) |
Total equity
| ▼HK$ | 820 million | (2000–01) |
| ▼HK$ | 755 million | (2001) |
- Owner: Global China Technology Group (74.5%)
- Subsidiaries: Sing Tao Limited (100%)

Chinese name
- Traditional Chinese: 星島集團有限公司
- Literal meaning: Singtao Group Limited Company
Transcriptions
Yue: Cantonese
- Jyutping: sing^{1} dou^{2} zaap^{6} tyun^{4} jau^{5} haan^{6} gung^{1} si^{1}
- Footnotes based on consolidated financial statements of financial year 2000–01 and 2001; financial year 2000–01 ended on 31 March; financial year 2001 ended on 31 December

Sing Tao Limited
- Traditional Chinese: 星島有限公司
Transcriptions
Yue: Cantonese
- Jyutping: sing^{1} dou^{2} jau^{5} haan^{6} gung^{1} si^{1}

Sing Tao Newspapers Limited
- Traditional Chinese: 星島報業有限公司
Transcriptions
Yue: Cantonese
- Jyutping: sing^{1} dou^{2} bou^{3} jip^{6} jau^{5} haan^{6} gung^{1} si^{1}

Sin Poh Amalgamated (H.K.) Limited
- Traditional Chinese: 星系報業(香港)有限公司
Transcriptions
Yue: Cantonese
- Jyutping: hoeng^{1} gong^{2} sing^{1} hai^{6} bou^{3} jip^{6} jau^{5} haan^{6} gung^{1} si^{1}

Sing Tao Holdings Limited was a Bermuda-incorporated company, but headquartered in Hong Kong. The company was listed in the Stock Exchange of Hong Kong. The company was a media and property conglomerate until it was dismantled in 2002. After selling the main media business and subsequent takeover in mid-2002, the legal person of the listed company, along with its property business, was renamed Shanghai Ming Yuan Holdings.

Sing Tao Holdings and its predecessor Sing Tao Limited were majority owned by founder Aw Boon Haw, his daughter Sally Aw and other family members for almost 50 years. Facing financial troubles, Sally Aw sold the controlling stake to a private equity fund of Lazard in 1999. It was then acquired by Charles Ho's listed company Global China Technology Group in January 2001. However, in mid-2002 it was re-sold to a Chinese private company Ming Yuan Investment Group, but excluding Sing Tao's main business: newspaper (as Sing Tao Media Holdings) as well as a hotel in Canada.

In February 2020, the wholly owned subsidiary in Australia was liquidated with over 20 long serving staff made unemployed without notice and their entitlements not paid by the company. Newsagents were pursued for unsold newspapers and not credited for returns.

Around 1991, the group also owned a travel agency, a medical centre, a recording studio and a pharmaceutical company.

== History ==
=== Predecessor ===
==== A family-held publisher ====
The predecessor of Sing Tao Holdings as a parent company of Sing Tao Group, was Sing Tao Limited, which was incorporated on 22 October 1951 as Sin Poh Amalgamated (H.K.) Limited. It replaced "Sing Tao Jih Pao Limited" as the parent company of the group, which the latter was incorporated on 29 June 1938.

It was renamed to Sing Tao Newspapers Limited on 27 May 1972 and Sing Tao Limited on 13 February 1986. At first, the main business of the company was the publisher of Sing Tao Daily (Chinese: 星島日報) and Sing Tao Wan Pao (Chinese: 星島晚報; lit. 'Sing Tao Evening News').

According to the Annual Return filed to the Hong Kong Company Registries in 1952, Aw Boon Haw owned 630 out of 1500 shares of the company; other shareholders were his sons (Aw Kow (胡蛟) 60; Aw Swan (胡山), 60; Aw It Haw (胡一虎) 100; Aw Sze Haw (胡四虎) 100), daughters (Sally Aw and Aw Sing (胡星) 60 each), nephews (Aw Cheng Chye (胡清才), and Aw Cheng Taik (胡清德), 60 each) and grandson, daughters and third generation relatives (total 310 shares held by 9 persons), for a total of 18 persons. Aw Hoe, son of Aw Boon Haw, who helped the family to found Sing Tao Daily, died in January 1951 due to a plane crash. The shareholder structure also making other newspapers that founded by Aw family in other city, did not have any relation with each other as parent company and subsidiary.

Sally Aw also replaced his foster brother Aw Swan as the head of Sing Tao Daily in mid-1952, as Aw Swan allegedly borrow money by using his foster father's name without his consent. Aw Boon Haw even made a public announcement to renounce his relationship with Aw Swan.

After the death of Aw Boon Haw in 1954, As of 1959, Aw Cheng Chye, eldest son of Aw Boon Haw's brother Aw Boon Par (b.1888, d.1944), was the general manager of Singapore-based Eng Aun Tong, the maker of Tiger Balm, while Sally Aw, became the head of Sin Poh Amalgamated (H.K.) Limited, which she was the largest shareholder among the family member. As of 1971, Sally Aw's brother, Aw Kow, was also a director of Sin Chew Jit Poh of Singapore and Malaysia; her brother, Aw Swan, was the general manager of Sin Chew Jit Poh from June 1971 to circa 1972; while her cousin Aw Cheng Taik was the managing director of Singapore Tiger Standard until it was defunct in the 1950s. Widow of Aw Hoe, Chan Sow Yong, also served as an executive of Sing Tao.

As of 1961, Sally Aw another brother, Aw It Haw still owned a minority stake in Sin Poh Amalgamated (H.K.), and also served as a director.

Aw Toke Tone, son of Aw Hoe, was the managing director of Hong Kong Tiger Standard in 1967.

==== Initial public offering and diversification ====
The shares of Sing Tao Newspapers Limited (Chinese: 星島報業有限公司) was once traded in Far East Exchange (Chinese: 遠東交易所) and Kam Ngan Stock Exchange (Chinese: 金銀證劵交易所; lit. 'Gold and Silver Stock Exchange') from 1972, the predecessors of The Stock Exchange of Hong Kong (Chinese: 香港聯合交易所; lit. 'Hong Kong United Stock Exchange'). The initial public offering price was HK$6. Sing Tao's shared was traded in [old] Hong Kong Stock Exchange Limited since 1977. Sing Tao's listing was only few years behind the listing of Haw Par Brothers International, a Singapore company held by Singapore-based branch of Aw family. Moreover, the publisher of Hong Kong Tiger Standard was changed from "The Tiger Standard Limited" to "Hong Kong Standard Newspapers Limited" circa early 1970s (the latter was incorporated on 28 August 1970). The former was owned by Aw family directly but the latter was a subsidiary of Sing Tao Newspapers Limited in the late 1970s for 55% shares. It was owned by Aw Toke Tone (Chinese: 胡督東), the eldest son of the late Aw Hoe for about 90% in 1970.

In October 1972, it was announced that a subsidiary (provisional Chinese name Chinese: 星島置地 (Note: No record in Hong Kong Companies Registry, the database of Hong Kong companies that have legal Chinese name and English name)) was formed to invest in real estate. The group purchased a land lease on 838 Lai Chi Kok Road, Kowloon (New Kowloon Inland Lot No.5567) to build a printing factory and commercial floor area for lease in 1974. (Note: The location was sold by Sing Tao on unknown date and re-developed in 1997.) In 1977, it was announced that the group had formed its own recording studio (Note: Sing Tao Pansonic Limited (Chinese: 星島全音有限公司), from 1987 known as Silver Planet Records (Chinese: 銀星唱片) and lastly "Sing Tao Planet" in 1998; dissolved in 2005; unknown date of disposal by Sing Tao, but still listed as a Sing Tao subsidiary in 1991.) and photography processing centre (Note: Chinese: 星島彩色沖印中心) that open to retail customers.

According to 1977–78 result announcement, Sing Tao Group had also expanded into travel agency, (Note: At that time as unincorporated entity namely: Chinese: 星島旅遊部; according to an obituary, the department was founded in 1972; in 1991 the department was known as "Sing Tao Tours Limited".) medical centre (Note: Sing Tao Medical Centre Limited (Chinese: 星島保健中心有限公司); renamed to PathLab Medical Laboratory (Chinese: 栢立醫學化驗所) in 1992; unknown date of disposal by Sing Tao) and pharmaceutical industry. (Note: Announced as Chinese: 新科(香港)有限公司; Jyutping: san1 fo1 (hoeng1 gong2) jau5 haan6 gung1 si1, but no record in Hong Kong Company Registry; another company Synco (H.K.) Limited (Chinese: 新科製藥有限公司; Jyutping: san1 fo1 zai3 joek6 jau5 haan6 gung1 si1) was listed as a subsidiary of Sing Tao Limited in 1991; unknown date of disposal by Sing Tao) By 1979, Sing Tao operated their printing and publishing business as Leefung-Asco Printers), (Note: Official legal Chinese name Chinese: 利豐雅高印刷 was added in 1990; was a listed company between 1991 and 2006; unknown date of disposal by Sing Tao) as well as Leefung-Asco's joint venture South China Printing Co., Ltd. Sing Tao also invested 49% stake in a documentary studio Farkas Studios in 1979.

==== Privatization and second IPO ====
In 1985, the company was privatised by Sally Aw via an Australian-listed company Cereus Australia for a reported price HK$13 per share (HK$11.5 cash and 1 share of Cinclus. (Note: Cinclus was a subsidiary of Sing Tao but was agreed to sell to another listed company Ariadne Australia in 1985 by Sally Aw and her family member, the largest shareholder of Cinclus (78%) after the privatisation of Sing Tao Newspapers Limited, for HK$2.06 per share; Cinclus agreed to acquire 49% stake of Energy and Environmental Research Co. from Impala Securities in an all-share deal that year (Ariadne Australia was owned 40% stake of Impala Securities); Cinclus was renamed to Impala Pacific in October 1985; it was a Hong Kong-listed company circa 1985 to 1989; Impala Securities became a subsidiary of Impala Pacific during that period.)) However, shares owned by Aw family members would only receive HK$9 per share (HK$7.5 cash and 1 share of Cinclus). The deal also made Cinclus had a wide shareholders base to apply for listing as a replacement of Sing Tao.

Sing Tao and now independent listed company Impala Pacific (ex-Cinclus), via an investment vehicle Scilla Limited, (Note: Scilla Limited was renamed by the new Japanese owner as Sunyou Intercontinental (H.K.) Limited in November 1986 and was dissolved in 2006) made a high-profile purchase on a land lease (Kowloon Inland Lot No.10722) in Canton Road, Tsim Sha Tsui, Kowloon in October 1985. The newspaper credited the land lease was the "Land King of Canton Road" (Chinese: 廣東道地王). The price was HK$630 million (HK$705 per gross floor area). It was reported that the consortium had re-sold the land lease to other real estate developer in 1986, which the location was now known as Lippo Sun Plaza, The Sun Arcade and a hotel, The Langham (Hong Kong).

However, less than a year of privatisation, Sing Tao Newspapers Limited was renamed to Sing Tao Limited (Chinese: 星島有限公司); the company started another IPO in 1986 and traded on the Stock Exchange of Hong Kong Limited on 19 March of the same year. It was reported that 75% shares were old shares that was sold by Cereus Australia's wholly owned subsidiary Cereus Newspapers (Hong Kong) Limited and only 25% were new shares.

In 1987, Sally Aw owned 101,385,026 number of shares directly while her nephew Aw Toke Tone owned 216,000 directly; they did not owned any of the subsidiaries of Sing Tao Limited, including "Hong Kong Standard Newspapers Limited" which Aw Toke Tone owned a minority stake in the late 1970s to 1984.

=== Sing Tao Holdings ===
Circa 1989 a Bermuda-incorporated company Sing Tao Holdings Limited replaced Sing Tao Limited as the holding company of the group. At the same time, Cereus Australia, the investment vehicle Aw used to privatise Sing Tao in 1985, was delisted on the Australian Securities Exchange in the same year by Kargat Pty Limited. The ex-parent company was engaged in property investment in Sydney.

According to a book published by the Chinese University of Hong Kong, citing a document that Sing Tao Holdings was a diversified conglomerate already in 1989, which only 7.7% revenue was from the newspaper despite 50% investments were newspaper related.

The company published the Sing Tao Daily, the oldest surviving Chinese language daily newspaper in Hong Kong, which is also published overseas editions in New York City, San Francisco, Vancouver, Toronto, London, Paris, Sydney and Melbourne. The first edition was published in 1938.

It also published the English business newspaper The Standard in Hong Kong.

Sing Tao also published the evening edition of Sing Tao Daily, known as Sing Tao Wan Pao (Chinese: 星島晚報; lit. 'Singtao Evening News'). The version discontinued in 1996.

The company also operates several printing businesses, most notably the South China Printing Company (1988) Limited. (Note: One source listed the company was acquired in 1997 but another source stated South China Printing Company (1988) Limited's parent company was Sing Tao Limited in 1991.)

Sing Tao Sports Club Limited, a professional football club founded by Sally Aw and Hsu King Shing (the coach of Sing Tao SC before its incorporation), was later owned by Sing Tao Limited and Wong Yue Kai (an accountant of Sing Tao Holdings). The paid-in share capital of the club was remained unchanged for many year for just HK$200.

In 1990s Sing Tao Holdings also acquired another listed company Jademan Holdings (a new Bermuda-incorporated parent company Culturecom Holdings was found in 1993 to replace Jademan Holdings as the listed company) Jademan Holdings was the publisher of another newspaper Tin Tin Daily News. Culturecom Holdings was sold in 1998 to ViaGold Capital. A subsidiary, Sing Tao Newspapers (Canada 1988) Limited, was also turned to a 50–50 joint venture between Sing Tao Holdings and Toronto Star Newspapers Limited in the same year. Toronto Star Newspapers also acquired 75% stake of Canada-incorporated Sing Tao Daily Limited, the publisher of Canada edition.

==== Sing Tao management found guilty of fudging circulation numbers ====
In 1998, members of the management team were found guilty of falsifying circulation numbers for The Standard newspaper, to attract advertisers and to raise the revenue of the newspapers. According to a report by the Center for International Media Assistance, the circulation of Sing Tao Daily and most major Beijing-friendly Chinese newspapers with overseas editions were remain unaudited, and therefore vulnerable to exaggeration:

Jack Jia, founder of the Toronto-based semiweekly Chinese News, known for its strong reporting on topics affecting the local Chinese community, contends that the circulation numbers of more Beijing-friendly Chinese-language papers are inflated, giving them an unfair advantage when obtaining revenue through advertising. Unclear figures in media directories, a lack of transparency and of independent circulation audits by publications such as Sing Tao, Ming Pao, and World Journal, and distribution route data relayed by an industry insider who wished to remain anonymous lend credence to such suspicions.

The Standard were audited by Hong Kong Audit Bureau of Circulations Limited as of 2012.

The case, later known as Hongkong Standard case or Sally Aw case (Chinese: 胡仙案) was criticised by the public by not suing Sally Aw, the chairwoman of Sing Tao Holdings. Chief executive of Hong Kong, Tung Chee-hwa, in the "Report on the key issues during the second year of the Hong Kong Special Administrative Region of the People's Republic of China" made a defence for decision of the Secretary for Justice Elsie Leung.

However, Tung Chee-chen, brother of Tung Chee-hwa, was an independent non-executive director of Sing Tao Holdings since December 1996, while Tung Chee-hwa also served the same position in the 1980s to the 1990s. It was reported that Tung Chee-hwa was a family friend of Sally Aw.

==== Takeover and dismantle ====
As of 1998, the company was still owned by Sally Aw, the daughter of the founder of Sing Tao Daily for 50.04%. It was reported that Aw agreed to sell 23% shares of the company, to Dublin-listed private equity fund China Enterprise Development Fund for a reported HK$115.8 million (HK$1.20 per share) in December 1998. However, Lazard Asia won the final bid to become the controlling shareholder for a reported HK$269 million (HK$1.25 per share). According to Charles Ho who bought Sing Tao Holdings in 2001 from Lazard, Cha Mou Sing also made an attempt to buy Sing Tao, but collapsed. However, Cha denied any formal agreement was signed. Ho's grandfather Ho Ying-chie, also filed a bankruptcy petition against Aw in January 1999. According to Ho Ying-chie, he had lent Aw HK$270 million. According to a reporter, Cha's listed company Mingly Corporation did announce a deal with Aw to form a new holding company for Sing Tao Holdings in May 1998, but the deal collapsed in June.

During Lazard as the major shareholder, Hong Kong banker Cheung Din Youn (Chinese: 張定遠, brother of Barry Cheung) was the chairman and Charles Ho was the honorary chairman and an independent non-executive director.

In mid-1999, Sing Tao SC stopped its operation as a football club. The legal entity of the company was used for other business in 2010 as Sing Tao Media Services, by its new owner Sing Tao News Corporation after many years of dormant.

In 2000, Sing Tao Holdings re-launched The Standard in tabloid format.

In January 2001, Global China Technology Group, majority owned by Charles Ho, acquired approximately 51.36% shares of Sing Tao Holdings from Astral Light Investments Limited, a subsidiary of Lazard Asia Fund A, L.P., for HK355.6 million (HK$1.65 per share).

In January 2002 South China Printing, Noble World Printing, Roman Financial Press, Valiant Packaging Holdings and their subsidiaries were sold from Sing Tao Holdings to Asia Printers Group for HK$428 million; Asia Printers Group was owned by CVC Capital Partners and Citigroup.

In August 2002 the shares of Sing Tao Holdings that held by Global China Technology Group (74.5%), was sold to a private company Ming Yuan Investment Group for HK163.8 million (HK$0.524 per share). Ming Yuan Investment Group was owned by Yao Yuan (Chinese: 姚原). However, the shares of Sing Tao Media Holdings, a subsidiary of Sing Tao Holdings, were distributed to the shareholders of Sing Tao Holdings before the takeover by Yao. Global China Technology Group offered to the public shareholders of Sing Tao Media Holdings after the transaction, to buy the shares of Sing Tao Media Holdings by offering the shares of Global China Technology Group, in a ratio of 1 to 1.75. The deal making the shareholder of Sing Tao Holdings at that time, would owned the shares of both Shanghai Ming Yuan Holdings (ex-Sing Tao Holdings) and Global China Technology Group if they did not sell the shares before the transactions.

The residual assets at the 2002 takeover was mainly property investment such as properties in Saba Road, Richmond, British Columbia and in Wyndham Place, Hong Kong. However, it excluded Colony Hotel in Toronto.
