= Tin Tin Daily News =

- Owner: Tin Tin Yat Pao (International)
- Founder: Wai Kee-shun family
- Publisher: Tin Tin Publication Development
- Ceased publication: 2000
- Political alignment: pro-communist (in later years)
- Language: Chinese (with Cantonese slang)
- Country: Hong Kong
Sister newspapers
Sing Tao Daily	(in 1990s)
Hong Kong Standard	(in 1990s)

Tin Tin Daily News
- Traditional Chinese: 天天日報
- Simplified Chinese: 天天日报
Transcriptions
Standard Mandarin
- Hanyu Pinyin: Tiāntiān Rìbào
Yue: Cantonese
- Jyutping: tin^{1} tin^{1} jat^{6} bou^{3}

Tin Tin Daily News also known as Tin Tin Yat Pao was a newspaper in Hong Kong, published between 1960 and 2000. In later years it took a pro-Beijing editorial stand. It was founded by the Wai Kee-shun family, who made their fortune in pharmaceutical industry and was the first colour-printed newspaper in Hong Kong.

The newspaper was published by Tin Tin Publication Development Limited and was printed by sister company Tin Tin Colour Printing Company Limited. However, the publishing rights was owned by Tin Tin Yat Pao (International) Limited, which was majority owned by bank. The publishing rights was licensed to another company Genvon in 1984 and then Tin Tin Publication Development in 1987.

In 1985, the paper's future was in doubt as the owner of the publisher, Alan Lau's business, Millie's Handbags and Shoes, had collapsed a year earlier. The paper was kept alive by a HK$30 million bank loan, personally guaranteed by Xu Jiatun, director of the Hong Kong branch of the Xinhua News Agency.

In 1987, 70% stake of Tin Tin Publication Development as well as 100% share capital of Tin Tin Colour Printing was acquired by Jademan Holdings (now known as Culturecom Holdings) for HK$77 million from Ho Sai-chu couple. Jademan Holdings was also proposed to lent money to Tin Tin Publication Development, to refurbish the shareholders' loan of Ho couple to the company, as well as proposed to acquire Tin Tin Yat Pao (International) Limited from the bank and Ho couple. Ho also acquitted a defraud accusation, which the prosecutor accused Ho had defrauded Tin Tin Yat Pao (International) from 1987 to 1990.

In 1990s, the controlling stake of Jademan Holdings was acquired by fellow listed company Sing Tao Holdings, making the newspaper became a sister newspaper of fellow Chinese language newspaper Sing Tao Daily, as well as English language newspaper Hong Kong Standard. Sing Tao Holdings was majority owned by Sally Aw, who also founded another newspaper Express News (Chinese: 快報). Jademan Holdings was also renamed to Culturecom Holdings in 1993. However, in 1998, the controlling stake of Culturecom Holdings was sold to Australia-listed company ViaGold Capital. The new majority owner of Culturecom Holdings, acquired 70% stake of Tin Tin Publication Development from Culturecom Holdings in November 1999, and then also disposed the shares of Culturecom Holdings. It was reported that Tin Tin Publication Development was under a heavy net loss of HK$3 million per month. Culturecom Holdings also leased some office floor area to Tin Tin Publication Development as well as signing some service provider contract with Tin Tin Publication Development in the same month. It was reported that the newspaper had changed ownership again in June 2000.

After a period of declining circulation and popularity, Tin Tin Daily News was forced to close in September 2000. Several related newspapers, Everybody's Daily News (Chinese: 人人日報; Jyutping: jan^{4} jan^{4} jat^{6} bou^{3}) which resemble the Chinese name of the newspaper, as well as Hong Kong Globe (Chinese: 公正報; Jyutping: gung^{1} zing^{3} bou^{3}) and A Daily (Chinese: A報; Jyutping: A bou^{3}), soon followed. The former survived for 12 days, while the latter two became defunct by early 2002. It was also reported that Tin Tin Publication Development had failed to pay the loyalty fee to Tin Tin Yat Pao (International). Tin Tin Yat Pao (International) also sued Televerse Publishing, the publisher of Everybody's Daily News for copyrights infringement. While Televerse Publishing, had failed to pay Culturecom Holdings for rent as well as failed to pay the salary in March 2001.

== See also ==
- Media in Hong Kong
- List of newspapers in Hong Kong
