= Chestnut Residence =

University of Toronto residence hall

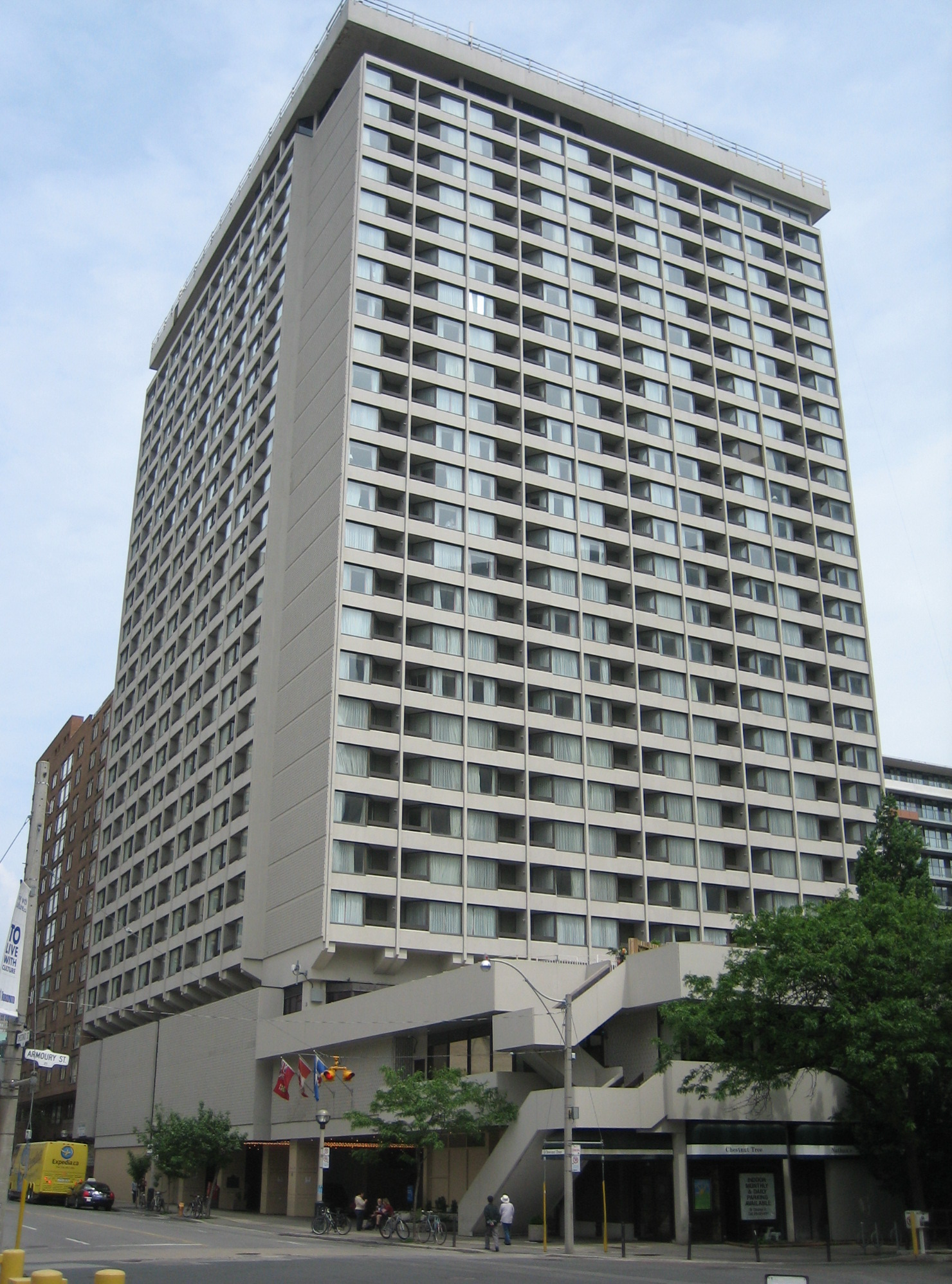
- Interactive map of the Chestnut Residence area

General information
- Type: Student accommodation
- Location: 89 Chestnut Street, Toronto, Ontario
- Coordinates: 43°39′16″N 79°23′7″W
- Completed: 1972
- Opened: 2004
- Owner: University of Toronto

Other information
- Public transit: at St. Patrick

89 Chestnut Residence is a university residence operated by the University of Toronto, opposite the downtown Toronto DoubleTree hotel (formerly the Metropolitan Hotel) at 89 Chestnut Street. It was converted from the Colony Hotel in 2004 and turned into a student residence to accommodate the incoming double cohort in 2003 and 2004. It is located south of the university's St. George campus in Downtown Toronto.

== History ==
The building was originally constructed by the firm Armstrong and Molesworth as a Motel 11, now a discontinued brand of motels. When it opened as the Holiday Inn Downtown in 1972, it was the fourth largest hotel in the city, with 749 rooms. It cost some $18 million to build and was built on the site of many small buildings of what was then the centre of Toronto's First Chinatown. The hotel was purchased by Hong Kong investor Sally Aw for $73 million in 1989 and renamed the Colony Hotel. The hotel was later partly owned by Aw's listed company Sing Tao Holdings, via Singdeer Joint Ventures. Aw sold Singtao Holdings in 1999. The university purchased the hotel for C$67.6 million in 2003 from Global China Group Holdings (the new owner of ex-Sing Tao Holdings' media business) and another owner of the joint venture, at the height of a downturn in Toronto's hotel industry.

Prior to buying the hotel, the University of Toronto had rented space to house 400 students at the Primrose Hotel at Jarvis and Carlton.

It has nearly 1,000 residents from the University of Toronto and the Ontario College of Art and Design University. Until September 2008, it also accepted new applicants attending George Brown College and Toronto Metropolitan University.

== Features ==
It has a conference centre and a revolving room on the 27th floor (opened as La Ronde restaurant in 1972 and is now a student lounge called The Lookout). It is the most expensive residence of all University of Toronto residences and has a reputation for providing luxurious accommodation and food. The university retained the hotel chef after purchasing it. Chestnut is also home to a larger number of international students than any other residence.

The Chestnut Residence Council is the student governing body for social, athletic and community affairs of the Residence. It organizes activities such as: the annual Chestnut semi-formal, coffee houses and open mic nights, ski and snowboarding trips, and intramural sports tournaments.

== See also ==
- List of University of Toronto buildings

== Sources ==
- "U of T considering purchase of Colony Hotel." Tony Wong. Toronto Star. Feb 1, 2003. pg. F.01
- "U of T to buy Colony Hotel." Toronto Star. Feb 15, 2003. pg. A.27
- "Students the stars at this grand hotel; U of T renovated downtown Colony as overflow dorms." Louise Brown. Toronto Star. Aug 8, 2003. pg. E.01
- "Ontario: U of T buys hotel to convert to student housing." National Post. Feb 15, 2003. pg. A.11
- "It's home suite home for students." Caroline Alphonso. The Globe and Mail. Aug 12, 2003. pg. A.6
