= The Fookien Times =

Philippine Chinese-language newspaper

- Native name: 新閩日報
- Type: Daily newspaper
- Format: Broadsheet
- Owner(s): The Fookien Times Company, Inc. (closed in 1972; later reestablished as The Fookien Times Yearbook Publishing Company, Inc.)
- Publisher: James Go Puan Seng
- Founded: 1926
- Ceased publication: 1972
- Political alignment: Independent
- Language: Chinese
- Headquarters: Binondo, Manila, Philippines

The Fookien Times (Chinese: 新閩日報; pinyin: Xīn Mǐn Rìbào; Pe̍h-ōe-jī: Sin Bân Ji̍t-pò / Sin Bân Li̍t-pò; lit. 'New Fukien Daily Newspaper') was a daily broadsheet newspaper in the Philippines written in the Chinese language. Founded by Dee C. Chuan in 1926, it was once the Philippines' largest Chinese-language newspaper in terms of circulation.

Although the newspaper itself was shut down in 1972 by Ferdinand Marcos with the imposition of martial law, some of its facilities were later used for the publishing of campaign materials during the People Power Revolution, and it continues to print until today the better-known Fookien Times Philippines Yearbook, one of the Philippines' longest-running publications.

== History ==
The Fookien Times was established by Dee C. Chuan in February 1926, originally targeting Chinese migrants to the Philippines from Fujian. In its early history, the newspaper was concerned with raising money for flood relief in Fujian through the "Save Fujian Hometown Campaign", which had been ravaged by flooding in 1925 and 1926. In contrast to newspapers like the Chinese Commercial News, which Dee established earlier as a newspaper for the Chinese Filipino merchant class and the political issues in the Philippines concerning them, the founding of The Fookien Times was motivated by major events in mainland China rather than happenings in the Philippines.

Dee founded the newspaper along with James Go Puan Seng (Chinese: 吳半生; pinyin: Wú Bànshēng; Pe̍h-ōe-jī: Gô͘ Pòan-seng), a twenty-year old reporter and editor for the Kong Li Po (公理報; Kong Lí Pò) who was appointed the newspaper's editor and general manager. Go would rise through the ranks of The Fookien Times, later becoming the newspaper's editor-in-chief and, ultimately, its co-publisher. In 1929, the newspaper was sued for libel by two prominent community leaders after they were implicated in the abuse of a young Cantonese girl sold as a slave — Go was initially sentenced to two months' imprisonment and the payment of a ₱300 fine, but the case was later overturned by the Supreme Court and it later became the groundwork for contemporary legislation on libel in the Philippines.

Throughout the 1930s, Go used the newspaper to criticize the Empire of Japan, calling for the boycott of Japanese goods. This became even more apparent after the Second Sino-Japanese War, when he stepped up his criticism of Japan after the Marco Polo Bridge Incident, so much so that General Douglas MacArthur warned him that he would be the first Chinese Filipino the Japanese would execute because of his writings. As such, the newspaper shut down during World War II, during which Go went into hiding in the mountains of the Sierra Madre.

The Fookien Times resumed publication after the Philippines was liberated by combined Filipino and American troops at the end of World War II, with Go resuming his role as the newspaper's editor-in-chief. The newspaper would later begin publishing other publications, including the Financial Journal, a weekly English-language business magazine, and the Sunday Morning Journal news magazine. It also began expanding overseas, publishing a Hong Kong edition of the newspaper, and later publishing the Philippine edition of the Sing Tao Daily, one of Hong Kong's largest Chinese-language newspapers.

The newspaper would continue to remain in print until 1972, when President Ferdinand Marcos ordered the closure of all newspapers in the Philippines, including The Fookien Times, with the imposition of martial law. Go later left the Philippines for self-imposed exile in Canada, never to return. However, it is possible that the newspaper was able to restart publication during the martial law era.

During the events leading up to the People Power Revolution in 1986, Go's eldest daughter, Betty Go-Belmonte, repurposed The Fookien Times printing presses to print campaign materials for the presidential campaign of Corazon Aquino. Go-Belmonte would later go on to establish two of the Philippines' largest English-language newspapers, the Philippine Daily Inquirer and the Philippine Star.

== The Fookien Times Philippines Yearbook ==
Although The Fookien Times itself is no longer in print, it continues to print one of the Philippines' longest-running publications, the annual English-language Fookien Times Philippines Yearbook. Established in 1936 as the Fookien Times Yearbook, it originally contained general "overview" articles on national issues written by prominent Filipinos, as well as statistical data on the Philippines. More recent editions of the Philippines Yearbook meanwhile have been likened to "the business men and women's Vogue magazine", driven in part by the prominent brands that advertise in the publication, and has been likened more to an advertising folio than a news magazine.

Publication of the Fookien Times Philippines Yearbook is still done by the Go family through the Fookien Times Yearbook Publishing Company, with Grace Glory Go, the younger sister of Betty Go-Belmonte, serving as the company's chairman and CEO. The yearbook's publisher, meanwhile, is her son, Vernon Go, better known as the publisher of Pulp, a music magazine which is also published by the Fookien Times Yearbook Publishing Company. Although the Philippines Yearbook is published in the Philippines, actual printing of the yearbook is done in Hong Kong.
