= Wai Kee-shun =

Hong Kong businessman and publisher (1933–2026)

Wai Kee-shun, SBS (Chinese: 韋基舜; 8 March 1933 – 8 February 2026) was a Hong Kong businessman, publisher and sports commentator.

== Life and career ==
Wai was born into a well-off family which owned a medicine company in Hong Kong on 8 March 1933. He was educated at the New Method College and left for the United States to further his studies in early 1951. After he returned to Hong Kong in 1956, Wai helped his brother to establish Tin Tin Daily News, in which he was the president from 1960 to 1977.

He had been a sports commentator for many years, commentating boxing among other sports for TVB and Cable TV. He had also been chairman of the various sports associations in the 1960s and 1970s, Hong Kong Boxing Association, Hong Kong Table Tennis Association, Tung Wah Sports Association, and vice-president of Hong Kong Football Association. He was the lifetime honorary president of the Hong Kong Muay Thai Association. He has also been member of the Hong Kong Sports Development Board since 2003.

Wai was also the director of the Tung Wah Group of Hospitals Reform Movement in 1958 and director of Po Leung Kuk. He was involved into politics in the late 1980s, becoming the chairman of the New Hong Kong Alliance, a conservative pro-China political party set up by Lo Tak-shing. He was appointed member of the Preparatory Committee for the Hong Kong Special Administrative Region (HKSAR) and became the member of the Selection Committee which was responsible for electing the first Chief Executive of Hong Kong in 1996. In 1997, he became the Hong Kong deputy to the National People's Congress. For his contributions, he was awarded Silver Bauhinia Star by the SAR government in 2002.

Wai died on 8 February 2026, at the age of 92.
