= Pulp (Filipino music magazine) =

Filipino music magazine

PULP (magazine)
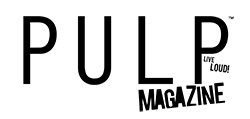
- Official PULP Magazine logo.
- Categories: Music
- Frequency: Bi-monthly (previously Monthly)
- Publisher: The Fookien Times Yearbook Publishing Company, Inc.
- Founder: Vernon Go
- Founded: 1999
- First issue: December 1999
- Company: The Fookien Times Yearbook Publishing Company, Inc.
- Country: Philippines
- Based in: Quezon City
- Language: English · Filipino

PULP Magazine is a Philippine-based monthly music magazine that is published by the Fookien Times Philippines Yearbook Publishing Co. Inc. and which has catered to Filipino music fans in the country and other parts of the world for almost a decade now.

== History ==
Releasing its first issue in December 13, 1999 with a well-attended street party which closed down the entire Ayala Avenue in Makati Philippines, PULP Magazine was the brain-child of present Publisher Vernon Go, a former music columnist for local broadsheet The Philippine Star and himself, formerly a musician (Go was guitarist for a local heavy metal band called Tribulation). Having been fueled by the lack of a local glossy that featured not just local music but local rock music in particular (which was constantly being ignored by the mainstream media at the time) and combining his passion for stylish and cutting edge photography and design, many conservative readers first thought PULP to be pushing the envelope a bit too far, even accusing the publication to be a rip-off of the international magazine Rolling Stone.

PULP alumni include Asia Agcaoili, Karen Montelibano, Maureen Larazabbal, Kristine Jaca, Gwen Garci, Mylene Dizon, Giselle Sanchez, Tom Epperson, Erik Liongoren, Gary Buenavista and Kristine Fonacier.

PULP band covers appearance features Eraserheads, Wolfgang, Parokya Ni Edgar, Dicta License, Kamikazee, Sugarfree, Rivermaya, Sponge Cola, Itchyworms, Tanya Markova, True Faith, Rocksteddy.
