= Bastille Post =

Online news outlet based in Hong Kong

- Owners: Lo Wing Hung (70%); Sing Tao News Corporation (30%)
- Editor-in-chief: Idy Lee Tung
- Founded: 2013; 13 years ago
- Political alignment: Pro-establishment
- Language: English; Chinese
- Website: www.bastillepost.com/global (English); www.bastillepost.com/hongkong (Chinese)

The Bastille Post (Chinese: 巴士的報; Jyutping: baa1 si6 dik1 bou3) is an online news and media outlet based in Hong Kong.

It was established in 2013 by Lo Wing Hung and Sing Tao News Corporation. Lo owns 70% of its stock, and Sing Tao News Corporation owns 30%. The editor-in-chief is Idy Lee Tung, a former head reporter at ATV News.

Its name is a reference to the Bastille fortress, the starting point of the French Revolution; it symbolises its intention to cause a "revolution" in media dissemination.
