= Dee C. Chuan =

Chinese Filipino businessman (1888–1940)

- 李清泉
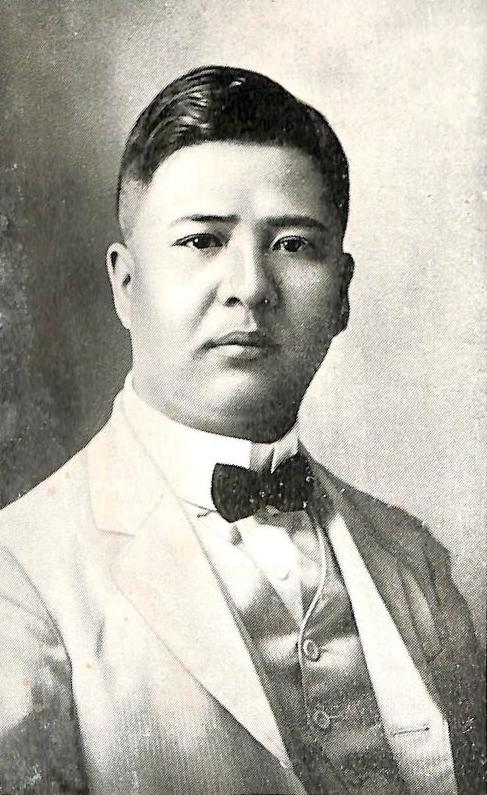
- Born: Dee Ching Chuan (Hokkien POJ: Lí Chheng-choân) (Mandarin Pinyin: Lǐ Qīngquán); August 13, 1888; Tsìnkang, Fukien, Qing China
- Died: October 27, 1940 (aged 52); Monrovia, California, U.S.
- Resting place: Manila Chinese Cemetery, Manila, Philippines
- Education: St. Joseph's College
- Occupations: Businessman, philanthropist

Dee Ching Chuan (Chinese: 李清泉; Pe̍h-ōe-jī: Lí Chheng-choân) (August 13, 1888 – October 27, 1940) was a prominent Chinese Filipino businessman, philanthropist, and activist known as the Philippine "Lumber King" during the American colonial rule. He was the youngest president of the Philippine Chinese General Chamber of Commerce from 1919 to 1924 (later renamed as the Filipino Chinese General Chamber of Commerce Inc. or FCGCCI) and founded China Banking Corporation (China Bank) in 1920. He also founded Chinese language newspapers Chinese Commercial News and The Fookien Times.

== Family and early life ==
Dee Ching Chuan was born on August 13, 1888, in Shizhen Village, Jinjiang in the Chinese province of Fujian. His name literally meant "Plum-Pure-Spring." He was the eldest son of Dee Chao Yi (baptized Calixto Dyyco when he converted to Catholicism) and Chen Shuangniang. The young Dee went to a primary school in Shizhen village from 1896 to 1899. Then in 1900 to 1901, he attended the Tongwen College on Kó͘-lōng-sū, an island near Amoy, which was run by British consulate officials, to learn English. In 1901, at the age of thirteen, Dee C. Chuan traveled to Manila to live with his father, helping in the family business, Chengmei Lumber (founded in the 1870s at Calle Arranque, Santa Cruz, Manila), and going to a local public school.

In 1903, his father sent him to St. Joseph's College in Hong Kong, the oldest Catholic boys' secondary school in the crown colony. There, he became friends with his schoolmates: Central Bank governor-to-be Miguel Cuaderno Sr.; the future president of the Philippines, Manuel Roxas of Capiz; and Manuel Go Tianuy of Cebu, son of tycoon Pedro Gotiaoco and uncle of tycoon John Gokongwei Jr. Dee and Miguel Cuaderno Sr. became particularly close. They promised each other that when they got back to Manila, they would each found a bank. And in time they did: Dee would build China Bank while Cuaderno built the Philippine Bank of Commerce (BankCom), and later becoming the first governor of the Central Bank of the Philippines (BSP).

== Becoming the "Lumber King" ==
In 1906, at the age of eighteen, Dee C. Chuan returned to the Philippines to work for his father and uncle Dy Pac in Chengmei Lumber. He quickly gained the trust of his father and uncle and got their go-ahead to expand the business. Dee bought several acres of land on Juan Luna Street in Tondo to create room for expansion, and spent 120,000 pesos for a new sawmill for this land. In 1908, Calixto Dyyco retired back to the family village in China, and Dee C. Chuan took over the family business. In 1910, Dee married a Fujianese girl, Gan Tiak, and they had eight children.

Within a dozen years after starting his career, Dee C. Chuan had grown so big and so prominent. He owned and ran Negros Philippines Lumber Company, Singbe Transportation Company, Dee C. Chuan and Sons, and Philippine Lumber Manufacturing Company, among other companies. By the time he turned thirty, the Chinese-Filipino community called upon him to take on a role in an arena bigger than lumber.

== Founding of China Bank ==
Following Dee C. Chuan's election as 14th President of the Filipino Chinese General Chamber of Commerce in 1919, at age 31, he began discussions with the other top businessmen in Chinatown about organizing a bank for Chinese businessmen. To form a Chinese bank in Manila, Dee faced two problems: mobilizing the necessary capital, which he estimated to be around P5 million, and acquiring banking expertise. During a previous trip to Fujian, Dee had met a Chinese Indonesian businessman named Huang Yizhu (Oei Ik-Tjoe in Indonesian Dutch orthography). Huang became the equivalent of an "angel investor" for China Bank. He put in P1 million, bought 20 percent of the shares, took a board seat, and did not interfere with operations. Dee assembled a group of ten Chinese from Manila to provide the rest of the capital and form the board, along with himself and Guillermo A. CuUnjieng, Benito Siy Cong Bieng, Carlos Palanca Sr. (Tan Guin Lay), Albino SyCip, Go Jocco, Uy Yet, Antonio MH Limgenco, Yu Biao Sontua, Vicente L. Gotamco, and Guillermo Dy Buncio.

China Banking Corporation opened on August 16, 1920, in Binondo, Manila. Its Chinese name in Mandarin and Hokkien respectively is as follows, simplified Chinese: 中兴银行; traditional Chinese: 中興銀行; pinyin: Zhōngxīng Yínháng; Pe̍h-ōe-jī: Tiong-heng Gûn-hâng; lit. 'China-Prosper-Silver-Capable'.

== Philanthropist and activist tycoon ==
In the twenty years since the founding of China Bank, Dee C. Chuan had been a very busy man. Dee also used his considerable resources and contacts to help mainland China. First, Dee focused on his home village of Shizhen. He donated the Chengmei School For Boys and the Yude School For Girls. He not only put up the buildings but also bought a fishpond whose earnings would pay for school operations. He also built a new bridge and other infrastructure in Shizhen. From 1926 to 1928, when Chiang Kai-Shek was building up the KMT Nationalist Army to reunite the country, Dee C. Chuan paid out of his own pocket for the steamship tickets for many young Chinese in Manila who wanted to join Chiang and fight. In 1931, he began to contribute heavily to the Chiang government as Japan started to encroach upon its northern territory, including Manchuria. In 1933, Dee accepted an appointment from Chiang as one of the five commissioners governing Fujian province from 1933 to 1934. In Fujian, Dee organized a police force, built the foundation of a badly needed railroad—the Zhanglong railway, and helped improve the harbor in Xiamen. When full-scale war between China and Japan broke out in 1937, Dee and his good friends, Albino and Alfonso SyCip and Yu Khe Thai, organized the Philippine Chinese Resist-The-Enemy Foundation. They helped raise P10 million from the local Chinese community and sent it to aid the KMT. These men also led a vigorous effort to boycott Japanese goods in the Philippines, which hurt Japanese interests in the country substantially. Dee also conceptualized and helped set up the Nanyang General Relief Association, which was a Southeast Asian organization of overseas Chinese bent on combatting Japanese aggression. The Japanese have a long memory. When they conquered the Philippines in 1941, the Kempeitai (Military Police of the Imperial Japanese Army) would come looking for the men who organized the boycott. But Dee C. Chuan would not be around to face their retribution.

== Death ==
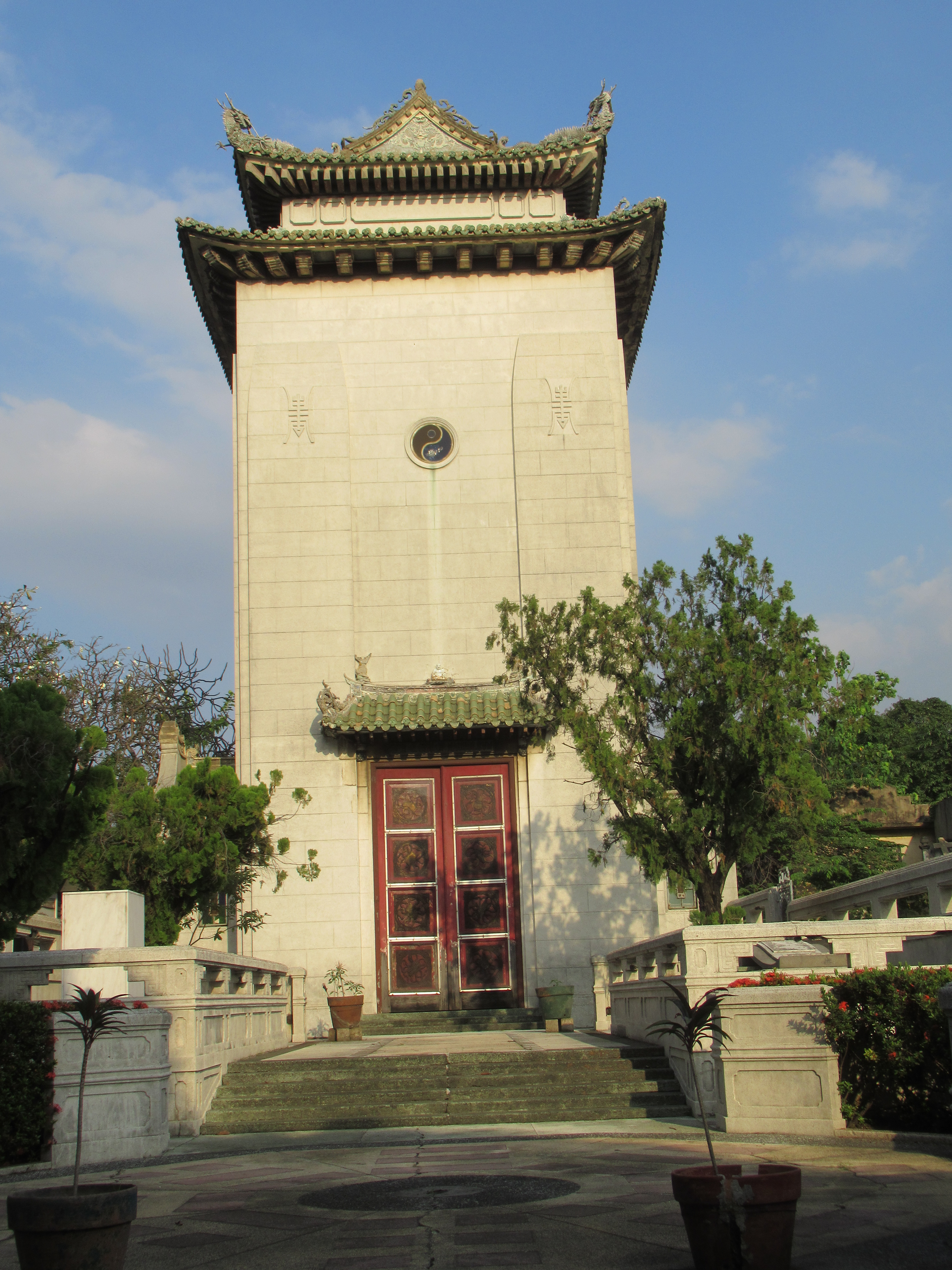
Dee C. Chuan Mausoleum

Dee C. Chuan contracted tuberculosis, and by 1939, his condition worsened. He was treated at Monrovia Sanatorium in California, the same place where in 1928, President Manuel L. Quezon had recovered from the disease. On October 27, 1940, Dee C. Chuan died of tuberculosis in Monrovia. He was 52. The funeral service was held November 30, 1940, at Central Student Church in Ermita, and he was buried on December 1, 1940, at the Chinese Cemetery. About 10,000 people rode or walked in the funeral cortege, which included some 600 cars and 45 Meralco buses, which had been rented for the occasion. The Dee family erected a three-story mausoleum modeled after the crypt of Sun Yat-sen.
