= Mingyuan Medicare Development =

Chinese biotechnology company

- Formerly: Shanghai Ming Yuan Holdings
- Type: unlisted
- Traded as: SEHK: 233 (former)
- ISIN: BMG6179J1036
- Industry: Biomedical
Predecessor
Sing Tao Holdings	(the legal person and property investment business)
Divisions of Ming Yuan Investment Group	(the current business)
Founded
1989	(Sing Tao Holdings)
2002	(as Ming Yuan Holdings)
- Founder: Yao Yuan (Ming Yuan Holdings)
Headquarters
Hamilton, Bermuda	(registered office)
Sheung Wan, Hong Kong	(HK office)
- Key people: Andrew Lam (chairman)
- Revenue: ▲HK$404 million (2013)
- Net income: ▼HK$(1.057 billion) (2013)
- Total equity: ▼HK$1.184 billion (2013)
Owner
Andrew Lam	(18.59%)
- Website: www.mingyuan-hk.com

Mingyuan Medicare Development
- Traditional Chinese: 銘源醫療發展
Transcriptions

Mingyuan Medicare
- Traditional Chinese: 銘源醫療
Transcriptions

Mingyuan Medicare Development Co., Ltd. formerly known as Shanghai Ming Yuan Holdings Limited and Sing Tao Holdings Limited, is a Bermuda-incorporated company, headquartered in Hong Kong. However, in the past 15 years its main business was based in the mainland China. The company was formerly listed in the Stock Exchange of Hong Kong.

Sing Tao Holdings was acquired by Global China Technology Group in 2001. However, in 2002 it was re-sold to Ming Yuan Investment Group, but excluding its main business newspaper (as Sing Tao Media Holdings) and a hotel in Canada.

Mingyuan Medicare Development failed to publish 2014, 2015 and 2016 annual reports. The company was suspended from trading since 2015. The company had a Chinese trading name 銘源醫療發展, but it was not registered as a legal company name in Hong Kong.

== History ==
In August 2002 Ming Yuan Investment Group, owned by Chinese businessman Yao Yuan (Chinese: 姚原; pinyin: Yáo Yuán), acquired Sing Tao Holdings, a cash shell, renaming the listed company to Shanghai Ming Yuan Holdings in October. The company then started many acquisitions of many biomedical firms that located in the mainland China, including firms that owned by the largest shareholder Yao Yuan.

In 2012 Mingyuan was removed from MSCI China Index of its Global Small Cap Indices.

In 2015, the company suspended itself from trading, as the annual report of financial year 2014, fails to publish in time in mid-2015. Moreover, the shares of the listed company that pledged by Ming Yuan Investment Group to a creditor, was sold by the creditor to other investors on order to refurbish the loan. However, Ming Yuan Investment Group sued the creditor back.

The new largest shareholder, Andrew Lam (Andrew Lam Ping-cheung), successfully re-elected the whole board of directors of the company by triggering the 2016 annual general meeting by the court order of the Supreme Court of Bermuda, which despite losing its status as largest shareholder, Yao Yuan was the director before the election. The new board of directors also found out that Yao Yuan and his brother Iu Chung (Chinese: 姚湧; pinyin: Yáo Yǒng) also stealing the company assets during the suspension of trading and in financial year 2014, as well as irregularity in previous financial statements. Immediate after the handover of the role of director, the hard drive and stamp of the company was also found missing from the Hong Kong office of the company. Former directors of Mingyuan: Yao Yuan, Zhao Chao, Zhou Li Qun, Yu Ti Jun, Lee Sze Ho and Tang Yan Qin were also censured by the Listing Committee of the Stock Exchange of Hong Kong on 28 September 2016. It was found that a sum of CN¥396 million was pay from a subsidiary to an independent third parties Beijing Nong Long Investment Management (Chinese: 北京农龙投资管理) on 23 December 2013 for alleged foreign exchange service. However, the sum was then gone missing, despite it was purportedly had recovered.

The company sued Hong Kong branch of Deloitte "in respect of the auditor's liability in its failure to detect, suspect and report fraudulent activity and/or other irregularities undertaken by the then management of the company, causing loss to the company" in December 2016, as the independent forensic investigator that was hired by the company, had found out the aforementioned subsidiary did not even have a bank account in Agricultural Bank of China that have an alleged CN¥420 million in it, which purported the story of the recovery of the fund.

In October 2017, the Securities and Futures Commission of Hong Kong had directed the Stock Exchange of Hong Kong to suspend all dealing of the shares of the company. According to the company, the SFC believed that some financial documents, including 2013 Annual Report and several press release, contained false, incomplete or misleading information, which were prepared by the previous management board including the Yao/Iu brothers. None of the member of the previous board were current member of the board of directors.

In January 2020, Mingyuan was delisted from the Hong Kong stock exchange.

== Subsidiaries ==
As of 31 December 2013

- Chinese: 上海數康生物科技 (100%)
- Chinese: 湖州數康生物科技 (100%)
- Chinese: 上海銘源數康生物芯片 (100%)
- Shanghai Kang Pei Bio-medical (75%)
- Genetel Pharmaceuticals Shenzhen (100%)
- Chinese: 上海源奇生物醫藥科技 (70%)
- Chinese: 上海慧普生物醫藥科技 (80%)
