= Eyeshield 21 =

Japanese manga series

- First tankōbon volume cover, featuring Sena Kobayakawa (front) and the students of the Deimon Private High School

アイシールド21 (Aishīrudo Nijūichi)
- Genre: Comedy drama; Sports
- Manga
- Written by: Riichiro Inagaki
- Illustrated by: Yusuke Murata
- Published by: Shueisha
- English publisher: NA: Viz Media
- Imprint: Jump Comics
- Magazine: Weekly Shōnen Jump
- Original run: July 23, 2002 – June 15, 2009
- Volumes: 37
- Original video animation

Eyeshield 21: The Phantom Golden Bowl
- Directed by: Tamaki Nakatsu
- Studio: Production I.G
- Released: September 2003 (Jump Festa Anime Tour); 2004 (Jump Festival)
- Runtime: 30 minutes
- Anime television series
- Directed by: Masayoshi Nishida (1–103); Shin Katagai (104–145)
- Music by: Kō Ōtani
- Studio: Gallop
- Licensed by: NA: Sentai Filmworks (expired)
- Original network: TV Tokyo
- English network: NA: Toonami Jetstream
- Original run: April 6, 2005 – March 19, 2008
- Episodes: 145
- Original video animation

Eyeshield 21: Christmas Bowl e no Michi
- Studio: Gallop
- Released: 2005
- Runtime: 11 minutes
- icon

Eyeshield 21 (Japanese: アイシールド21, Hepburn: Aishīrudo Nijūichi) is a Japanese manga series written by Riichiro Inagaki and illustrated by Yusuke Murata. The series tells the story of Sena Kobayakawa, an introverted boy who joins an American football club as a secretary, but after being coerced by quarterback Yoichi Hiruma, becomes the team's running back, wearing jersey number 21 and an eyeshield to conceal his identity. Inagaki chose American football as a central subject of Eyeshield 21 after realizing that it fit perfectly with his idea for the series.

The manga was originally serialized in Shueisha's shōnen manga magazine Weekly Shōnen Jump from July 2002 to June 2009. The series consists of 333 chapters collected in 37 tankōbon volumes. An anime adaptation consisting of 145 television episodes was co-produced by TV Tokyo, NAS, and Gallop. The television series first aired on Japan's TV Tokyo network from April 2005 to March 2008. The Eyeshield 21 franchise has spawned two original video animations (OVAs), audio albums, video games, and other merchandise.

In North America, the manga was released by Viz Media from April 2005 to October 2011. The anime series was later licensed in North America by Toonami Jetstream as a joint effort with Viz Media and aired in December 2007, on its site, but before its completion, the streaming service was shut down. The whole series was streamed in English by Crunchyroll, while Sentai Filmworks licensed the series, with distribution from Section23 Films on DVDs.

By July 2025, the manga had over 27 million copies in circulation. The manga and anime have been featured at various times in weekly top ten lists of best-selling in their respective media. The anime has been watched by a large number of television viewers in Japan, helping to raise American football's popularity in the country. Publications for manga, anime, and others have commented on Eyeshield 21, which received praise for its artwork and characters, and criticism towards its non-football related plotlines.

== Plot ==
Sena Kobayakawa is a timid and physically unremarkable student at Deimon Private Senior High School in Tokyo. (Note: Inagaki noted that the setting is based in Tokyo, though not necessarily in the city center, stating that it reflects elements of both creators' hometowns.) Despite his frail appearance, he possesses exceptional speed and agility. These unique talents are recognized by the school's American football team captain, Yoichi Hiruma, who forcibly recruits him as the Deimon Devil Bats' running back. To protect Sena from rival teams seeking to recruit him, he is concealed under the alias "Eyeshield 21", playing while wearing a helmet with an eyeshield and publicly serving as the team's manager.

The team's initial foray into the spring tournament ends in a decisive defeat against the dominant Ojo White Knights, highlighting their inexperience. The team's true focus becomes the fall tournament, a single-elimination tournament where Tokyo's top teams vie for a chance to advance to the Christmas Bowl, the championship game between the best high school teams from the Kantō and Kansai regions. Determined to build a competitive team, Hiruma, Sena, and head lineman Ryokan Kurita assemble a ragtag group of players. This includes former baseball player Tarō "Monta" Raimon, who becomes the team's star wide receiver, and several delinquents who fill out the offensive line. Their shared ambition is to reach the Christmas Bowl, a particularly urgent goal for the second-year students as a school rule prohibits third-year students from participating in club activities.

The team engages in rigorous training and exhibition matches, including a notable game against the visiting NASA Aliens from the United States. During this match, Sena befriends their running back, Patrick "Panther" Spencer, a former ball boy. The team then travels to the United States for intensive training under their former mentor, Doburoku Sakaki, enduring a grueling trek through the desert that forges stronger bonds and culminates in Sena revealing his true identity to his teammates.

Upon returning to Japan, the revitalized Devil Bats enter the fall tournament. As they advance, Sena learns the "Eyeshield 21" moniker originally belonged to a Japanese-American player from Notre Dame High School. After securing a place in the Kantō tournament, the team overcomes formidable opponents, including the Shinryuji Naga, led by the ruthless prodigy Agon Kongo, and a rematch against the Ojo White Knights. They ultimately win the Kantō championship, earning their place in the Christmas Bowl. There, they face the undefeated Teikoku Alexanders from Osaka, led by Takeru Yamato, the original Eyeshield 21. In a dramatic finish, the Devil Bats win the championship, and Yamato acknowledges Sena as the rightful successor to the Eyeshield 21 legacy.

Subsequently, Sena is invited to study at Notre Dame High School in America. Upon returning to Japan, he enrolls at Enma University, reuniting with former teammates and rivals who now play for various university and company teams. Together, they vow to compete for the Rice Bowl, Japan's national football championship.

In a later bonus chapter, the NFL's International Player Pathway Program offers a single spot with the San Antonio Armadillos to a Japanese player. Sena, now playing for the Enma Fires, and Hiruma, of the Saikyodai Wizards, compete against one another in the Koshien Bowl to determine the candidate. Although the Enma team is implied to be victorious, the final selection is not revealed.

== Production ==
Before the series was published regularly, Riichiro Inagaki and Yusuke Murata published two one-shots called Eyeshield Part 1 (前編, Zenpen) and Part 2 (後編, Kōhen) on March 5 and 12, 2002, in Weekly Shōnen Jump. When it would become a serial, the editorial department asked if Inagaki wanted to both write and draw the series, but Inagaki felt he was "so rookie", so he asked Murata to be the illustrator. Before being asked to work on Eyeshield 21, Murata had read some of Inagaki's manga and noted that they "had many cool design concepts of uniforms and equipment". He said, "it could be turned into a great manga story" and he would "be happy to take the challenge"; eventually he was chosen.

During Eyeshield 21's original run in the magazine, Inagaki went to the United States to see college football matches, and National Football League games. Despite having never played American football, Inagaki chose this theme after deciding that he wanted to create "a protagonist that was wimpy at the beginning, yet could perform outstandingly in a sports game", and with this premise in mind he decided that American football would be "a very suitable material". When originally creating Eyeshield 21, Inagaki said he was wary because he did not want his manga becoming "a simulator of football". The fact that football is not a popular sport in Japan also worried Inagaki. As last resort, he thought to turn the series into a "Kamen Rider-style masked hero story" if it could not met the popularity required for the magazine. However, it was such a popular series that online commentators said that, considering the series' final length, the editors may have insisted that Eyeshield 21 be kept going due to business reasons. However, Inagaki declared that the manga was "exactly how [he] wanted to tell the story" and that Murata also seconded it.

== Media ==
=== Manga ===
Written by Riichiro Inagaki and illustrated by Yusuke Murata, Eyeshield 21 was serialized by Shueisha in the shōnen manga magazine Weekly Shōnen Jump from July 23, 2002, to June 15, 2009. The manga consists of 333 chapters spanning 37 tankōbon (collected volumes), released from December 20, 2002, to October 2, 2010. Eyeshield 21 has also been published as part of the Shueisha Jump Remix series of magazine-style books. Fourteen volumes were released between June 28, 2010, and February 14, 2011. A special 55-page one-shot chapter, to celebrate the series' 21st anniversary, was published in Weekly Shōnen Jump on January 29, 2024.

An English translation of the manga was published in North America by Viz Media under the Shonen Jump Advanced label between April 5, 2005, and October 4, 2011.

The manga has also been licensed in some countries such as in France by Glénat, in Hong Kong by Culturecom, in Indonesia by Elex Media Komputindo, in Italy by Panini Comics, in South Korea by Daewon Media, and in Taiwan by Tong Li Publishing.

=== Original video animations ===
Two original video animations (OVA) based on the Eyeshield 21 manga series were developed. The first one, named The Phantom Golden Bowl (Note: 幻のゴールデンボウル, Maboroshi no Gōruden Bouru), was developed by Production I.G and shown as part of the Jump Festa Anime Tour in September 2003 and in Jump Festa 2004. The second OVA, titled Eyeshield 21: Christmas Bowl e no Michi – Minami no Shima de Tokkun da! YA-HA!! – (Note: アイシールド21 クリスマスボウルへの道 〜南の島で特訓だ! YA-HA-!!〜, Aishīrudo Nijūichi Kurisumasu Bouru e no michi 〜 Minami no Shima de Tokkunda! YA-HA-!!〜), was shown at Jump Festa 2005. The two OVAs were later released on DVD; the first was released with the second OVA of Naruto in a compilation called Jump Festa 2004 Super DVD. The other was released by Bandai Visual as an extra track on the sixth DVD of the Eyeshield 21 anime series.

=== Television series ===
The Eyeshield 21 anime adaptation was co-produced by TV Tokyo, NAS, and Gallop, and was directed by Masayoshi Nishida until episode 103, and by Shin Katagai from 104 to 145. The series of 145 television episodes aired in Japan from April 6, 2005, to March 19, 2008, on TV Tokyo. In Japan, Bandai Visual distributed the anime in DVD format; thirty-six volumes were released between July 26, 2006, and June 26, 2007. Some changes were done in comparison to the manga; for example, swearings and guns or gambling references were reduced. Initially, Viz Media and Cartoon Network planned to air a dubbed version of Eyeshield 21 on the internet video streaming service Toonami Jetstream, and on NFL Rush site as a joint effort with National Football League (NFL). The anime was eventually posted only on Toonami Jetstream, with the first episode, which condensed three episodes, being available on December 17, 2007. However, it was not completed due to Toonami Jetstream's cancellation and shutdown. In December 2008, the video streaming service Crunchyroll announced that it would begin to stream Eyeshield 21 subtitled on its site on January 2, 2009. The last episode was available on November 1, 2009, for premium users, and on March 7, 2010, for free users. On February 26, 2010, Section23 Films announced that Sentai Filmworks received the license to the anime. The first fifty-two episodes were released on four subtitled-only DVDs between May 18, 2010, and February 8, 2011.

==== Audio ====
The music for the Eyeshield 21 anime adaptation was composed by Kō Ōtani. The series use twelve pieces of theme music, five opening and seven ending themes. The opening themes are "Breakthrough" and "Innocence" by V6, "Dang Dang" by ZZ, "Blaze Line" by Back-On, and "Honō no Running Back" (Note: 炎のランニングバック; lit. 'Flaming Running Back') by Short Leg Summer. The ending themes are "Be Free" by Ricken's, "Blaze Away" by The Trax, "Goal" by Beni Arashiro, "Run to Win" by Aya Hirano, Miyu Irino, Koichi Nagano and Kappei Yamaguchi, "A day dreaming..." by Back-On, "Flower" by Back-On, and "Song of Power" by Short Leg Summer.

A number of audio CDs linked to the anime series have been released in Japan. The original soundtrack was released on two discs by Avex Mode on March 5, 2008, under the title Eyeshield 21 Complete Best Album. Three compilation albums, Eyeshield 21 Original Soundtrack Sound Field 1, Eyeshield 21 Sound Field Especial, and Eyeshield 21 Song Best, featuring opening and ending themes, insertion songs, and character and team songs were released on August 31, 2005, December 21, 2005, and March 23, 2006, respectively. Six maxi singles containing character songs have also been published. The first three, for Sena Kobayakawa, Mamori Anezaki, and Monta, were released on October 26, 2005. The other three, with the songs of Haruto Sakuraba, Seijurou Shin, and Suzuna Taki, were released on January 25, 2006. In addition to the musical CDs, Eyeshield 21 Drama Field 1, an audio drama CD, was released by Avex on September 21, 2005.

=== Video games ===
Konami produced Eyeshield 21 games for Sony video game systems; it released Eyeshield 21: Let's Play American Football! Ya! Ha!! (Note: アイシールド21 アメフトやろうぜ! YA-! HA-!!, Aishīrudo Nijūichi Amefuto Yarouze) for the PlayStation 2 on December 22, 2005, and Eyeshield 21: Portable Edition (Note: アイシールド21 ポータブル エディション, Aishīrudo Nijūichi Pōtaburu Edition) for the PlayStation Portable on March 2, 2006. Nintendo secured the rights to the Eyeshield 21 video game license for its systems in December 2004, releasing Eyeshield 21: Max Devil Power for the Nintendo DS on February 2, 2006, and Eyeshield 21: Devilbats Devildays for the Game Boy Advance on April 6, 2006. Another game was scheduled for release on the GameCube, but it was later canceled. Nintendo published an Eyeshield 21 game for the Wii, entitled Eyeshield 21: The Field's Greatest Warriors (Note: アイシールド21 フィールド最強の戦士たち, Aishīrudo Nijūichi: Fīrudo Saikyō no Senshi Tachi), which was released in Japan on March 8, 2007. Two non-football games, Jump Super Stars and Jump Ultimate Stars, released for the Nintendo DS, have featured characters from the series. Various Devil Bats, Shin and Sakuraba from the White Knights appear in support cameos.

=== Print media ===
Two art books based on Eyeshield 21 were released. The first, Eyeshield 21 Illustration Collection: Field of Colors (Note: アイシールド21 イラスト集 Field of Colors, Nijūichi Irasuto Shū Fīrudo obu Karāzu), was published on November 2, 2006. The second, entitled Paint Jump: Art of Eyeshield 21, was released on December 19, 2008. Eyeshield 21 Official Databook: Chou Senshu Retsuden Ballers High (Note: アイシールド21公式データブック超選手列伝Ballers High, Aishīrudo Nijūichi Kōshiki Dētabukku: Chō Senshu Retsuden Bōrāzu Hai), a databook, was published on October 4, 2005. A pair of light novels were launched; the first, written by Katsumi Hasegawa, based on and named for the first OVA, was published on March 24, 2004. The second, Eyeshield 21: Netto no Hundred Game! (Note: アイシールド21 ～熱闘のハンドレッドゲーム！～, Aishīrudo Nijūichi: Nettō no Handoreddo Gēmu!), written by Eijima Jun, was published on May 26, 2006. The only original creator of the series who worked on these light novels was Murata, who illustrated them.

=== Other ===
In Japan, jigsaw puzzles, action figures, plush dolls, calendars, key chains, and a medal game machine were sold as merchandise for the series. Konami also released a collectible card game series.

== Reception ==
Best-selling manga rankings
No.	Peak rank	Notes	Refs
2	7	1 week	
3	6	2 weeks	
4	5	1 week	
5	6	2 weeks	
7	8	2 weeks	
8	5	1 week	
9	4	1 week	
10	4	2 weeks	
11	6	2 weeks	
12	7	1 week	
13	3	2 weeks	
14	7	1 week	
15	4	2 weeks	
16	3	2 weeks	
19	2	2 weeks	
20	3	2 weeks	
21	2	2 weeks	
22	3	2 weeks	
23	3	2 weeks	
24	5	2 weeks	
25	2	2 weeks	
26	3	1 week	
27	3	2 weeks	
28	5	2 weeks	
29	6	2 weeks	
30	5	2 weeks	
31	2	1 week	
32	4	2 weeks	
33	1	2 weeks	
34	4	2 weeks	
35	3	2 weeks	
36	5	1 week	
37	4	2 weeks	

=== Popularity ===
By July 2025, the manga had over 27 million copies in circulation (including digital copies); individual volumes frequently appeared on top ten lists of best-selling manga there (see table). Individual volumes have appeared in Diamond Comic Distributors's lists of 300 best-selling graphic novels in North America several times. The anime adaptation was also featured several times in Japanese television rankings, with the first episode having a 7.5 percent television viewership rating. In 2006, Japanese television network TV Asahi conducted a poll for the top hundred anime, and Eyeshield 21 was placed 47th. Moreover, Eyeshield 21's series is credited with increasing the number of Japanese teenagers playing American football. However, commenting on its genre's lack of popularity in the United States, Jason Thompson wrote in Anime News Network that "Even Eyeshield 21, a sports manga which is practically made for Americans, wasn't a big hit here".

=== Reviews ===
Critics have generally given the Eyeshield 21 manga positive reviews. Deb Aoki from About.com wrote that tying with Bleach, Eyeshield 21 was the best continuing shōnen manga of 2007, because it "has well-written characters, dynamic artwork, nail-biting cliffhangers, plus a winning mix of comedy, action and drama". On the 2008 list, Aoki listed Eyeshield 21 as the best continuing shōnen, as it was able to "[come] into its own" from other shōnen series. In that same year, Pop Culture Shock's Sam Kusek elected it the best continuing manga series. Chris Zimmerman of Comic Book Bin was positive on his review of the volumes 30–33; he affirmed it is "one of the best shonen titles out there" and described it as "a superb series, with well developed characters, intense action, and touching humor". Scott Campbell of Active Anime commented it is an "action-filled" series with great artwork and humor, and that it "has managed to continually get more and more dynamic with each volume".

Jarred Pine from Mania.com praised the humor and how the creators "bring out the energy and excitement of the game for the readers". June Shimonishi, reviewing for School Library Journal, wrote that it "delivers a fresh and entertaining take on all the standard sports clichés". She also said that its art is "superb ... with every inch filled with details and no gag left unseen". Zac Bertschy from Anime News Network (ANN) declared Eyeshield 21 "defies convention" by turning what most might consider "a really ridiculously bad idea" into "something most everyone would be able to enjoy". Carlo Santos from ANN called it a "typical sports story", writing that what make it an above average series are its characters and artwork. He also wrote that people who think American football is boring "may change their minds after seeing the action sequences in Eyeshield 21." Later, Santos said, "[a] lot of familiar clichés show themselves" in Eyeshield 21, and that "[t]he storyline also does a sloppy job of keeping track of the game ... making it even less believable than it already is". However, overall, he considered the story has good art, action and pace, featuring "pure sports storytelling at its finest".

The anime adaptation of Eyeshield 21 received positive and mixed responses. Bobby Cooper from DVD Talk praised how the rules of American football are "explained to a foreign audience that has no clue what it's all about", adding that instructions at the commercial breaks "were informative and similar to the Go lessons of Hikaru No Go." He also said the explanations were "hilarious", but that "Eyeshield 21 is an excellent introduction to football". The on-field action was also praised, with he saying the sports action is "where Eyeshield 21 truly shines", although he criticized the scenes away from the football field, "the pacing slows to a crawl and the storyline gets a little boring". In her review, Erin Finnegan from Anime News Network stated, "[t]he pace of Eyeshield 21 is its saving grace. It's way less boring than all the time outs and commercial breaks in a regular NFL game. Football is hard to understand, but Eyeshield 21 explains the Byzantine rules ... in an entertaining way. We're never left waiting for the ref's decision for long minutes like in real life. A lot of dramatic tension carries the action between plays". Finnegan also criticized the artwork, saying, "any episode [of the show] without a game is clearly farmed out to an inferior animation studio". Chris Beveridge from Mania Entertainment wrote that Eyeshield 21 "has a good solid story idea, showing a young man finding his way through sports by finding friends and realizing he has potential, but it is so sidelined so often that it's frustrating to see it deal with situations as it does".

== Notes ==
Japanese
