= Metropolitan Hotel =

Metropolitan Hotel may refer to:

== Hotels ==
- Metropolitan Hotel, Sydney, Australia
- Metropolitan Hotel (Asbury Park), New Jersey, US (closed 1989)
- Metropolitan Hotel (New York City), US, (closed 1895)
- Metropolitan Hotel (Washington, D.C.), US
- 569 Lexington Avenue, New York City, US, formerly Metropolitan Hotel and DoubleTree by Hilton Hotel Metropolitan New York City
- Accord Metropolitan Hotel, Chennai, India

== Music ==
- The Metropolitan Hotel, an album by Chely Wright
