= Global Forum for Media Development =

The Global Forum for Media Development (GFMD) is the largest community of journalism organizations dedicated to developing media organizations. The organization sees media development like the development of other infrastructure, helping it to be professionalized. A major role for the organization is the coordination and networking of media organizations around the world. It has also advocated for inclusion of freedom of expression and related values into the Sustainable Development Goals at the United Nations, succeeding in getting 'Public Access to Information' as a goal for the first time in 2016.

In 2016 it had over 200 organizations, up from 139 across 80 countries in 2014.

In 2024, the OECD published principles on media development after advocacy by the Global Forum for Media Development and the Center for International Media Assistance. As part of the process, GFMD surveyed its 203 member organizations.
