= Sing Tao Daily (Canada) =

Chinese-Canadian newspaper

Sing Tao Media Group (Canada) STMG
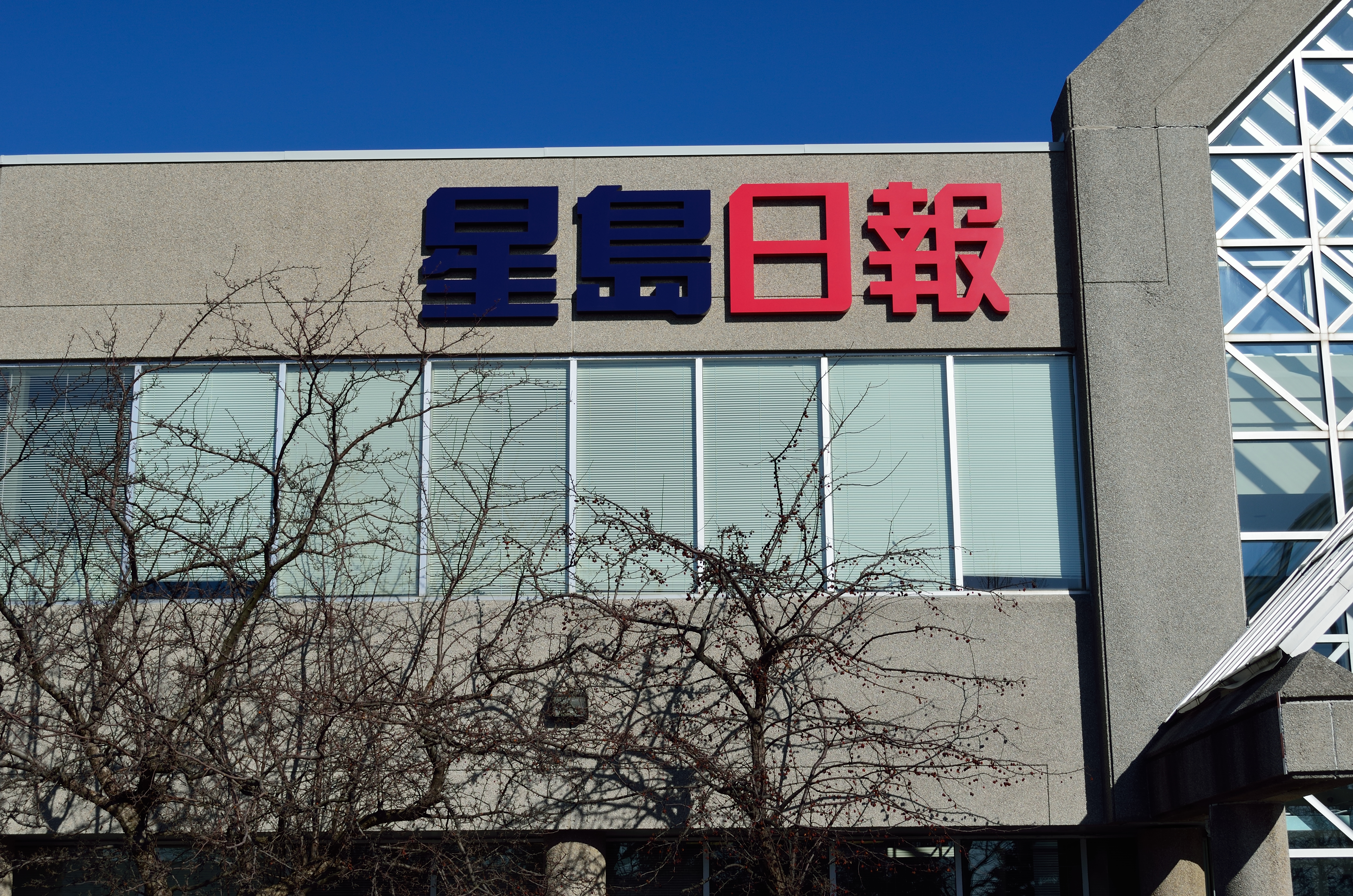
- Sing Tao Media Group's head office in Markham, Ontario
- Type: Daily online & radio, weekly & quarterly magazines
- Format: Broadsheet
- Owners: Private Canadian Corporation; Sing Tao News Corporation
- Language: Chinese
- Headquarters: Suite 201, 25 Royal Crest Court, Markham, Ontario; L3R 9X4
- Circulation: 180,000
- Website: www.stmg.ca

Sing Tao Daily
- Traditional Chinese: 星島日報
- Simplified Chinese: 星岛日报
Transcriptions
Standard Mandarin
- Hanyu Pinyin: Xīngdǎo Rìbào
- Wade–Giles: Hsingtao Jihpao
- Tongyong Pinyin: Xīngdǎo Rìhbào
- Yale Romanization: Syīngdǎu R̀bàu
- IPA: [ɕíŋtàʊ ɻɻ̩̂pâʊ]
Yue: Cantonese
- Yale Romanization: Sīngdóu Yahtbou
- Jyutping: Sing1 dou2 jat6 bou3
- IPA: [ɕɪ́ŋtǒu jɐ̀tpōu]

Sing Tao Media Group (Canada) (Chinese: 加拿大星島傳媒集團), or STMG for short, is a Chinese language media group based in Toronto, Ontario. It offers digital and social media marketing, radio broadcasting, magazine publishing, events management and e-commerce to Chinese Canadians, the second largest ethnic group in Canada.

The media brand began in Canada in 1978 as a Hong Kong-owned Chinese language newspaper. At a time, it published the largest Chinese-language newspaper in Canada, with print editions in Toronto, Vancouver, and Calgary. In a pivot to digital media, the print editions ceased publication on August 28, 2022. Today, it is the largest Chinese media group in Canada, reaching a community of 1.7 million nationwide.

Since 2023, it is jointly owned by a private Canadian corporation and the Hong Kong–based Sing Tao News Corporation. Previously, between 1998 and 2023, it was jointly owned by Torstar Corporation and Sing Tao News Corporation.

The current CEO of the company is Anson Wong, who succeeded the retiring Calvin Wong in April 2023.

Sing Tao's was connected to the Toronto Star through Andrew V. Go, former Star vice president for business ventures. Go's father, Go Puan Seng, was the publisher of The Fookien Times, then the Philippines' largest Chinese-language newspaper which also published the Philippine edition of the Sing Tao, and was a family friend of then Sing Tao Group's Sally Aw.

== Reception ==
According to National Post journalist Tom Blackwell and Claws of the Panda author Jonathan Manthorpe, the newspaper's editorial stance is pro-Beijing.

In 2009, the top editor of Toronto's Sing Tao Daily, Wilson Chan, was fired shortly after it was revealed that he drastically modified an original Toronto Star article on Tibet to remove criticisms of the Chinese government, before publishing the story in Sing Tao. The decision to remove Chan is said to have come from Torstar Corp, who owns a majority share in Sing Tao's Canadian edition.

The original story, "Chinese Canadians Conflicted on Tibet", which ran on April 13, 2008, was written by a reporter for the Toronto Star, an English-language newspaper also owned by Torstar Corporation. The relationship gives Sing Tao rights to translate and publish stories from the Star. Chan's edits to the Chinese language story, which were revealed by media outlets in 2009, included changing the headline to, "The West Attacks China With Tibet Issue, Inciting Chinese Patriotism Overseas". The edited version omitted all quotes critical of the Chinese regime's human rights abuses and added comments blaming the West for "suppressing China" with media reports of the crackdown in Tibet.

Sing Tao Canada won the inaugural Special Topic Award at the Canadian National Newspaper Awards in 2024 and was a finalist for the same honour in 2025.

== See also ==
- List of newspapers in Canada
- Sing Tao News Corporation
- Chinese Canadians in the Greater Toronto Area
