= Metropolitan Hotel (Asbury Park) =

Coordinates: 40.2193°N 74.0051°W

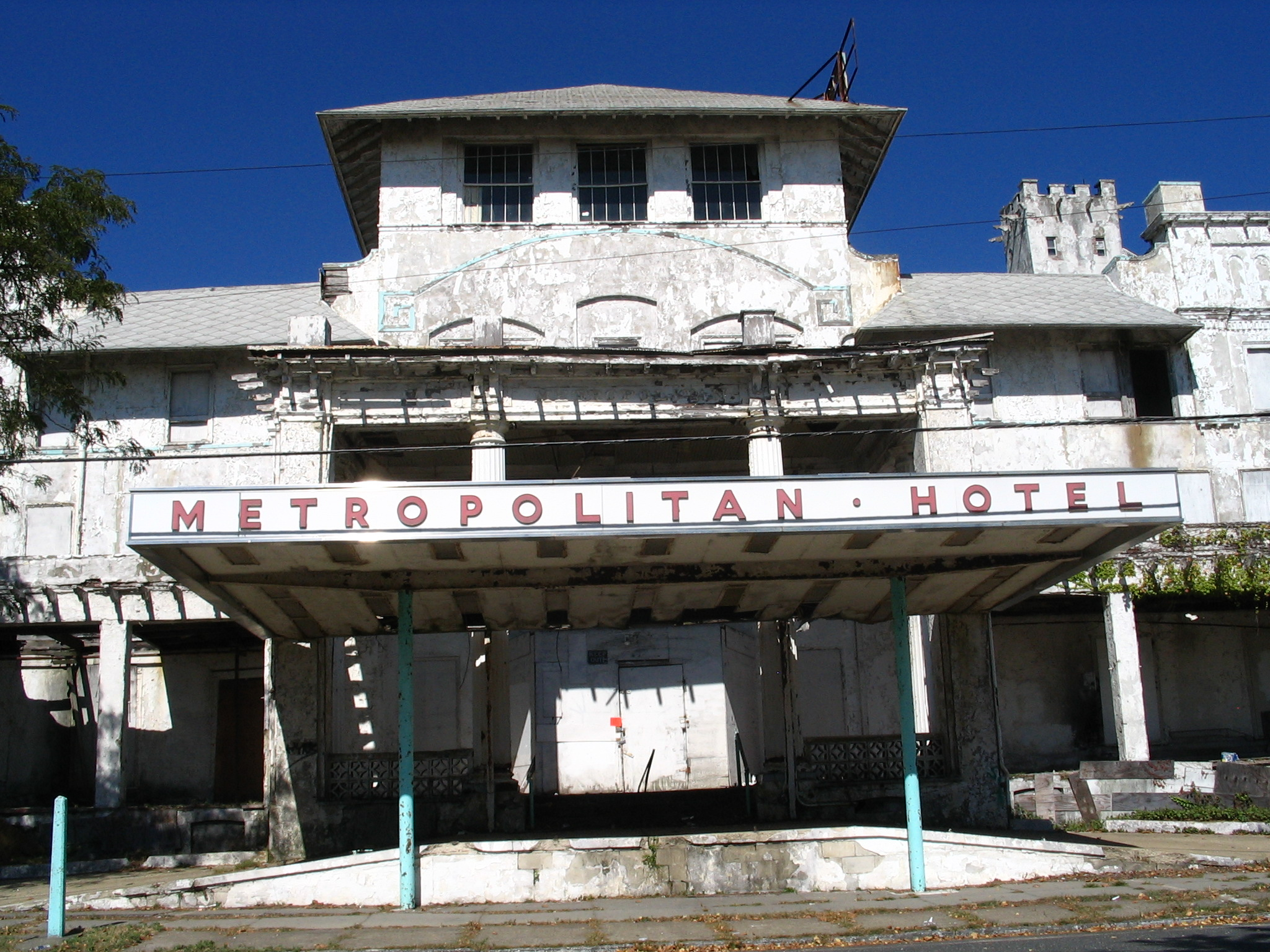
- South elevation of Metropolitan as it looked in September 2007.
- Interactive map of the Metropolitan Hotel area

General information
- Location: 309 Asbury Avenue, Asbury Park, New Jersey
- Closed: 1989
- Demolished: March 2008

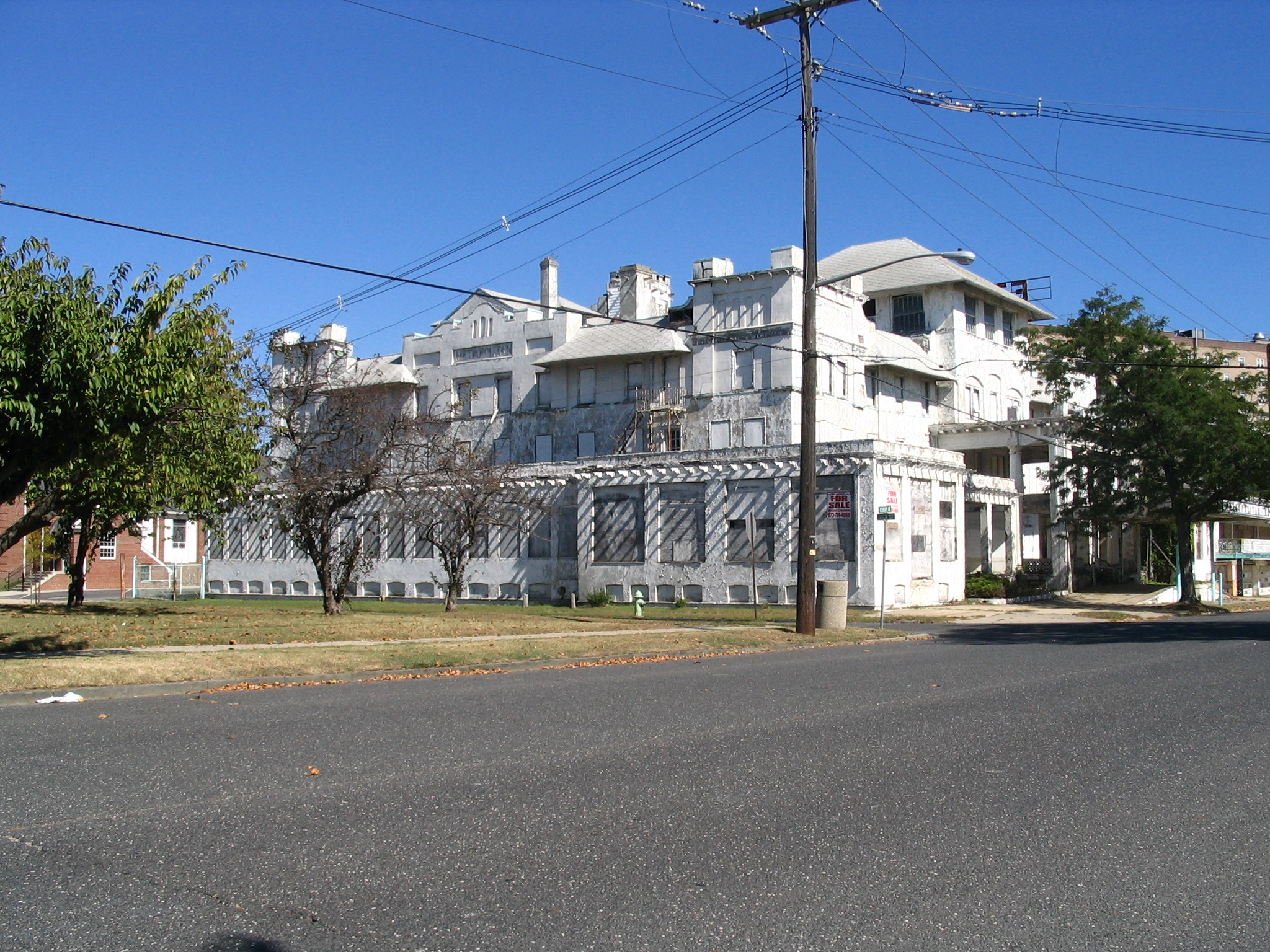
West elevation of Metropolitan as it looked in September 2007.

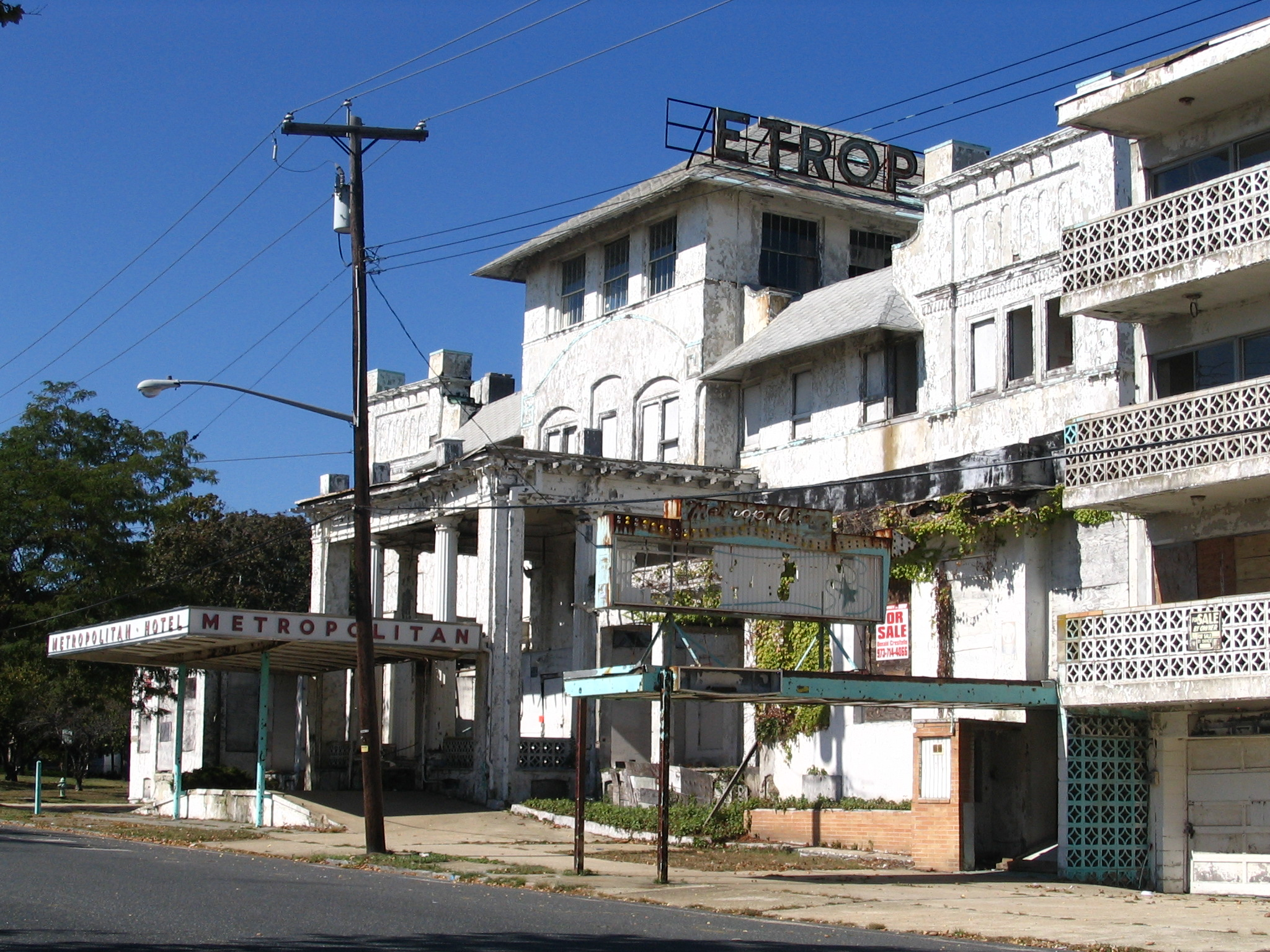
South elevation of Metropolitan as it looked in September 2007.

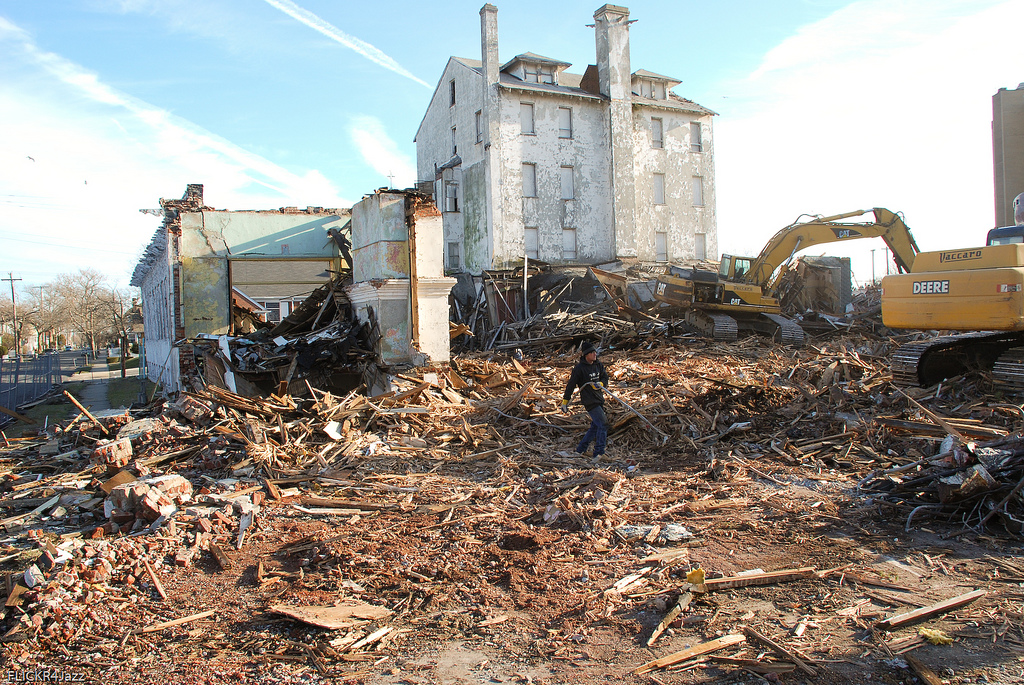
Demolition of The Metropolitan Hotel in 2009.

The Metropolitan Hotel was a 180-room historic structure located at 309 Asbury Avenue in Asbury Park, New Jersey and was one of the last large hotels operating in Asbury Park before it closed in 1989. In September 2007, it was announced that the Metropolitan Hotel had deteriorated to a point in which restoration or rehabilitation was no longer a possibility. The hotel was demolished in early March 2008.

The most recent structure was not the original, although a hotel had operated on the site under this name since the 1880s. The main structure was a Spanish Revival style built in a rectangle, with a four-story hip roof, central pavilion, two-story porticos with fluted Doric columns, and balustrade and enclosed porches. Decorative touches included the stucco surfacing, parapet roof and canales. The metal marquee was a later addition, and there was a newer motel wing on the east side of the property. The motel annex was razed in early December 2009.

Longtime owners Martin and Sylvia Weinblatt received $2.25 million for their hotel when they sold it in 1987 to Jersey City developers Karim Ahmed Elsaid and Gomaa Elsaid, who filed for bankruptcy protection the next year. The Metropolitan is currently owned by a group of Morristown investors called 309 Corp., who purchased the property for $150,000 in 1993 (from a group that acquired it from a bank for $10,150 earlier that year). 309 Corp had planned to open the 38-room hotel annex to people who needed housing in Asbury Park while they sought financing, but the city turned down their request because of changed zoning laws.

The Metropolitan was listed on the Monmouth County Inventory of Historic Sites, and was located in the Grand Avenue Institutional/Professional historic district.
