= The Standard (Hong Kong) =

Hong Kong English-language newspaper

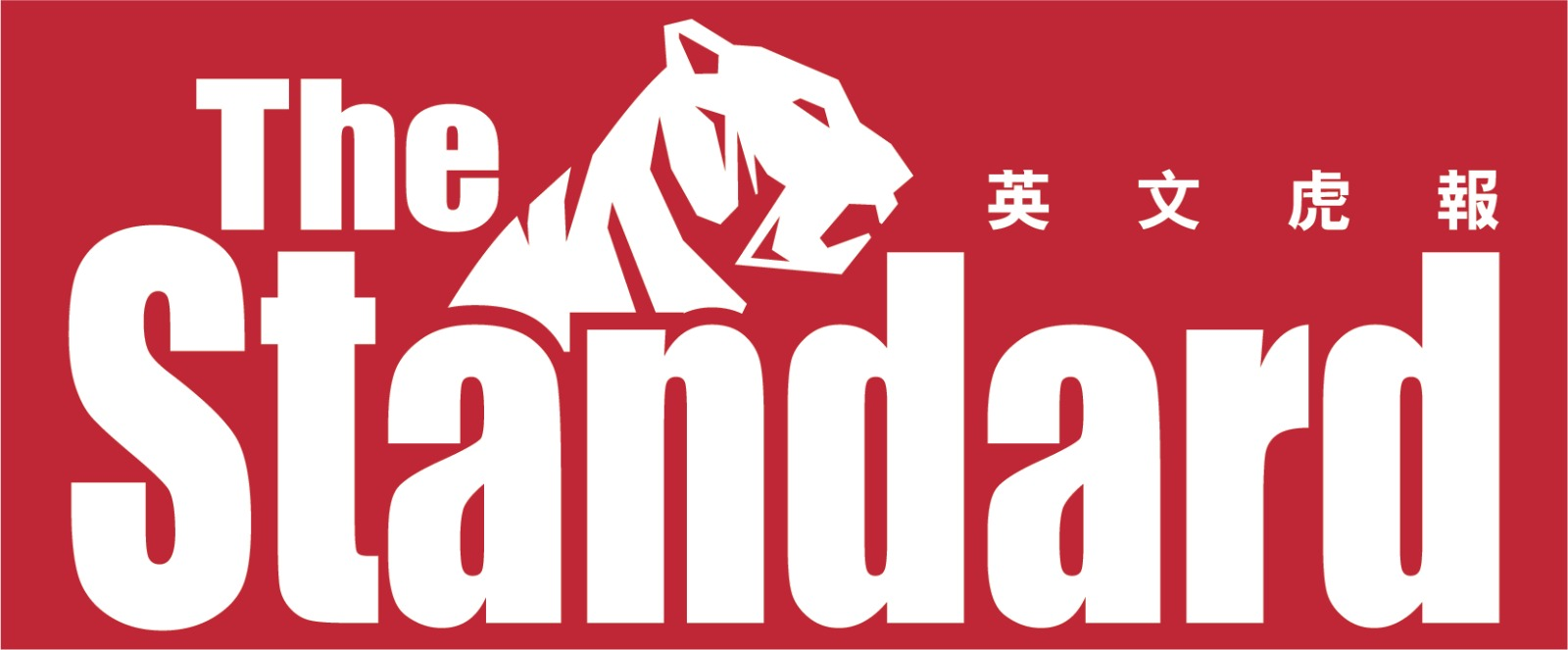
- Type: Daily free newspaper
- Format: Broadsheet (former); Tabloid (since 2000)
- Owner(s): The Standard Newspapers Publishing (part of Sing Tao News Corporation, majority stake in turn held by Guo Xiaoting, vice-chairwoman of Kaisa Group)
- Founder: Aw Boon Haw
- Publisher: The Standard Newspapers Publishing
- Founded: 1949; 1986 (evening edition)
- Ceased publication: 1987 (evening edition only)
- Political alignment: Pro-Beijing
- Language: English
- Headquarters: Sing Tao News Comm Building,7 Chun Cheong Street, Tseung Kwan O Inte Estate, Tseung Kwan O, New Territories, Hong Kong
- Country: Hong Kong
- Circulation: 200,450 (as of 2012)
- Sister newspapers: Sing Tao Daily (in Chinese); Headline Daily (in Chinese, free); Sing Tao Wan Pao (in Chinese, defunct); Singapore Standard (in English, defunct); other newspaper founded by Aw; other newspaper owned by Sally Aw
- Website: thestandard.com.hk

The Standard
- Traditional Chinese: 英文虎報
- Simplified Chinese: 英文虎报
- Literal meaning: English Language Tiger Newspaper
Transcriptions
Standard Mandarin
- Hanyu Pinyin: Yīngwén Hǔbào
Yue: Cantonese
- Yale Romanization: Yīng màhn fú bou
- Jyutping: Jing^{1} man^{4} fu^{2} bou^{3}
- Sidney Lau: Ying^{1}Man^{4}Foo^{2}Bo^{3}

The Standard is an English-language free newspaper in Hong Kong with a daily circulation of 200,450 in 2012. It was formerly called the Hongkong Standard and changed to HKiMail during the Internet boom but partially reverted to The Standard in 2001.

The South China Morning Post (SCMP) is its main local competitor.

== Format ==
The Standard is printed in tabloid format rather than in broadsheet. It is published daily from Monday to Friday.

== Ownership ==
As of 2001, The Standard was published by Hong Kong iMail Newspapers Limited (previously known as Hong Kong Standard Newspapers Limited) but currently The Standard Newspapers Publishing Limited. These enterprises are owned by Sing Tao News Corporation Limited, also the publisher of Sing Tao Daily and Headline Daily.

The Standard was previously owned by Sally Aw's Sing Tao Holdings Limited. Aw is the daughter of the founder Aw Boon Haw. In 1999 Holdings was acquired by a private equity fund, and in January 2001 by Charles Ho's listed company Global China Technology Group Limited (whose name was changed to Sing Tao News Corporation Limited in February 2005). In mid-2002 the ownership of an intermediate holding company of The Standard, Sing Tao Media Holdings, was transferred to Sing Tao News Corporation. At the same time Sing Tao Holdings, without its main business, was sold to a Chinese private company.

== History ==
The Standard was originally named the Hong Kong Tiger Standard. The newspaper was founded by Tycoon Aw Boon Haw after the end of the Chinese Civil War. He incorporated the publisher The Tiger Standard Limited on 23 May 1947. On the back of financially successful Sing Tao Daily and Tiger Balm, he attacked the English-language newspaper market by launching the paper on 1 March 1949 to give a Chinese voice to the world and to advance the interests of Chinese in all their endeavours and defend them against all kinds of inequalities, challenging the pro-colonial establishment press. It started life as a broadsheet, largely edited and run by Chinese, though not to the exclusion of other nationals. Politically, it shared the Sing Tao and Aw's allegiance to the Kuomintang.

These early editors were all thoroughly U.S. educated and trained, the first being L.Z. Yuan (father-in-law of Golden Harvest founder, Raymond Chow). There followed C.S. Kwei, a leading Chinese lawyer and bilingual intellectual–author, and Kyatang Woo, an alumnus of University of Missouri in Columbia, Missouri. In 1985 Robert Chow, who later became a staunch and vocal pro-establishment advocate of restrictive democratic elections for Hong Kong's chief executive, became the editor in chief of The Standard and worked there until the 1990s.

During the 1990s, when Sally Aw (Aw Sian, adopted daughter of Aw Boon Haw) chaired Sing Tao News Corporation Limited, The Standard was the only English newspaper in Hong Kong that was allowed to be circulated in China.

In 1994 a third English-language newspaper, the Eastern Express, appeared. Its bold headlines and large photographs provoked a radical redesign at the Standard, which also suffered the loss of a great many reporters, sub-editors, and advertising to the Eastern Express, tempted by its boasts of generous pay. The new paper quickly pushed the Standard into third place for full-price sales. The Standard adopted a distinctive orange and black masthead and an advertising campaign that used a carrot logo and the maxim "clearer vision." Meanwhile, an emergency recruitment drive brought in new staff from the UK and Tasmania, mostly from regional newspapers and on fixed contracts. Its Sunday supplement, Hong Kong Life, began free distribution in bars and clubs.

On 27 May 2000, facing challenges from its biggest competitor the South China Morning Post, the Hongkong Standard was renamed Hong Kong iMail (Chinese: 香港郵報) and reduced to tabloid size to attract more younger readers, and was refocused on business issues. On 30 May 2002, following the burst of the dot-com bubble, the paper reverted to being The Standard.

The current editor in chief is Bonnie Chen.

From 10 September 2007, The Standard, then sold at HK$6, became a free newspaper. It is now Hong Kong's first and only free English newspaper. The newspaper is considered pro-Beijing in its editorial stance.

=== Circulation fraud ===
In August 1996 the Independent Commission Against Corruption in Hong Kong found that 14,000 copies of the paper had been discarded at Wan Chai Pier and therefore started an investigation. The ICAC discovered that from 1994 to 1997 the circulation figures of the Hong Kong Sunday Standard and the Hongkong Standard had been routinely and substantially exaggerated, in order to attract advertisers and to raise the revenue of the newspapers. Circulation figures had always been somewhat obscure, owing to the Sing Tao group's longstanding agreements with hotels and clubs where the newspaper was distributed free.

As a result, the ICAC arrested three staff members of the Hongkong Standard and investigated Aw Sian as co-conspirator. The case was heard from 23 November 1998 to 20 January 1999, at the conclusion of which all three were found guilty and sentenced to 4 to 6 months in jail. Aw Sian was not charged, after the secretary of justice Elsie Leung decided not to prosecute her owing to insufficient evidence and in the public interest. The decision generated controversy among a skeptical public who saw this as discrimination in favour of the powerful and well-connected.
