= Culturecom =

Hong Kong company

Culturecom Holdings Limited
- Traditional Chinese: 文化傳信集團有限公司
- Simplified Chinese: 文化传信集团有限公司
Transcriptions
Standard Mandarin
- Hanyu Pinyin: Wénhuà Chuán Xìn Jítuán Yǒuxiàngōngsī
Yue: Cantonese
- Jyutping: man4 faa3 cyun4 seon3 zaap6 tyun4 jau5 haan6 gung1 si1

Jademan (Holdings) Limited
- Traditional Chinese: 玉郎國際集團有限公司
- Simplified Chinese: 玉郎国际集团有限公司
Transcriptions
Standard Mandarin
- Hanyu Pinyin: Yù Láng Guójì Jítuán Yǒuxiàngōngsī
Yue: Cantonese
- Jyutping: juk6 long4 gwok3 zai3 zaap6 tyun4 jau5 haan6 gung1 si1

Culturecom Holdings Limited, formerly Jademan (Holdings) Limited, is a Hong Kong company, headquartered in the Far East Finance Centre in Admiralty.

== History ==
Tony Wong Yuk-long (a.k.a. Tony Wong Chun-loong) created the company Jademan Holdings in 1971. In 1979, it became a formal corporation. The company was first listed on the Hong Kong Stock Exchange in 1986. At one time 80% of the comics market in Hong Kong came from this company. It acquired 70% of Tin Tin Daily News in April 1987, and acquired money from that company. According to Monica Ko of the South China Morning Post, because of Wong's profile in Jademan, the company's stock became known as "personality stock". Comics artist Ma Wing-shing worked for Jademan.

Beginning in the 1980s, Jademan began distributing comics in North America. The initial comic had a printing of 50,000. At first the circulation of its comics was 20,000 total, made up of four titles. Ultimately, the company had six titles in North America. By August 1990, the North American total circulation had declined to 10,000.

Tony Wong held control until 1989, when he was removed. After Wong resigned, his involvement in the company's comics ended. Tony Zie became the new chairperson. As of January 1990, the company had 65% of the Hong Kong comics market, and it had 16 titles in Chinese published in Hong Kong. In August 1990, the company had 14 comic book titles in Hong Kong, and the combined circulation there was 1.45 million, making up 60% of the comic book market. In Summer 1990, Ma Wing-shing started a new job at Jonesky.

In May 1992, the company changed its name to Cultural Communications as a way to push itself away from Tony Wong, who later was convicted of an offence and imprisoned. This became shortened to CultureCom. Leung Kin-cheung, the assistant general manager of the company, announced an intention to make new comic books with a different readership instead of competing with Tony Wong, who created another company, Jade Dynasty Publications.

Sing Tao Holdings acquired 39% of the shares of the company circa the late 1980s/early 1990s. Sing Tao made the decision to focus on translations of Japanese manga.

By 1998, Viagold Capital had proposed purchasing 32% of Culturecom for $21,000,000.

Circa August 1999, there was a proposal to give shares to Limeridge for $30,000,000, but an executive of a high level opposed the plan, and so in September 1999 it was nixed.

In 2000, the company had plans to develop a method of publishing electronic books in Chinese, referred to as the e-Cbook, with $200 million of investment money.

In 2004, there were plans to attract a "strategic partner", but when that failed, the company's stocks declined by 15.94%.

== Corporate affairs ==
The company was formerly headquartered in Harbour Centre (海港中心) in Wan Chai.

== Titles ==
By 2010 it had published upwards of 300 titles of translated manga, making it the Hong Kong publisher with the most translated manga.

There were six titles published in English.

Titles published in English:

- Chinese Hero: Tales of the Blood Sword as The Blood Sword (Note: The English translation by Jademan Comics called the series The Blood Sword while the translation by DrMaster called it Chinese Hero: Tales of the Blood Sword.)
- Drunken Fist
- The Force of Buddha's Palm
- Oriental Heroes

Hong Kong titles published in Chinese:

- Chinese Hero: Tales of the Blood Sword
- Drunken Fist
- The Force of Buddha's Palm
- Oriental Heroes

Titles in Spanish, distributed in Spain:

- Drunken Fist
- Tigre Wong (Oriental Heroes)

Japanese manga titles published in Chinese:

- Astro Boy
- Bakuman
- Bleach
- Captain Tsubasa
- Death Note
- Doraemon
- Dragon Ball
- Dragon Ball Super
- Eyeshield 21
- Hikaru no Go
- Hunter x Hunter
- Jujutsu Kaisen
- Look Back
- One Punch Man
- Phoenix
- Rurouni Kenshin
- Ultraman
- Yu-Gi-Oh!
