= Sally Aw =

Hong Kong businesswoman

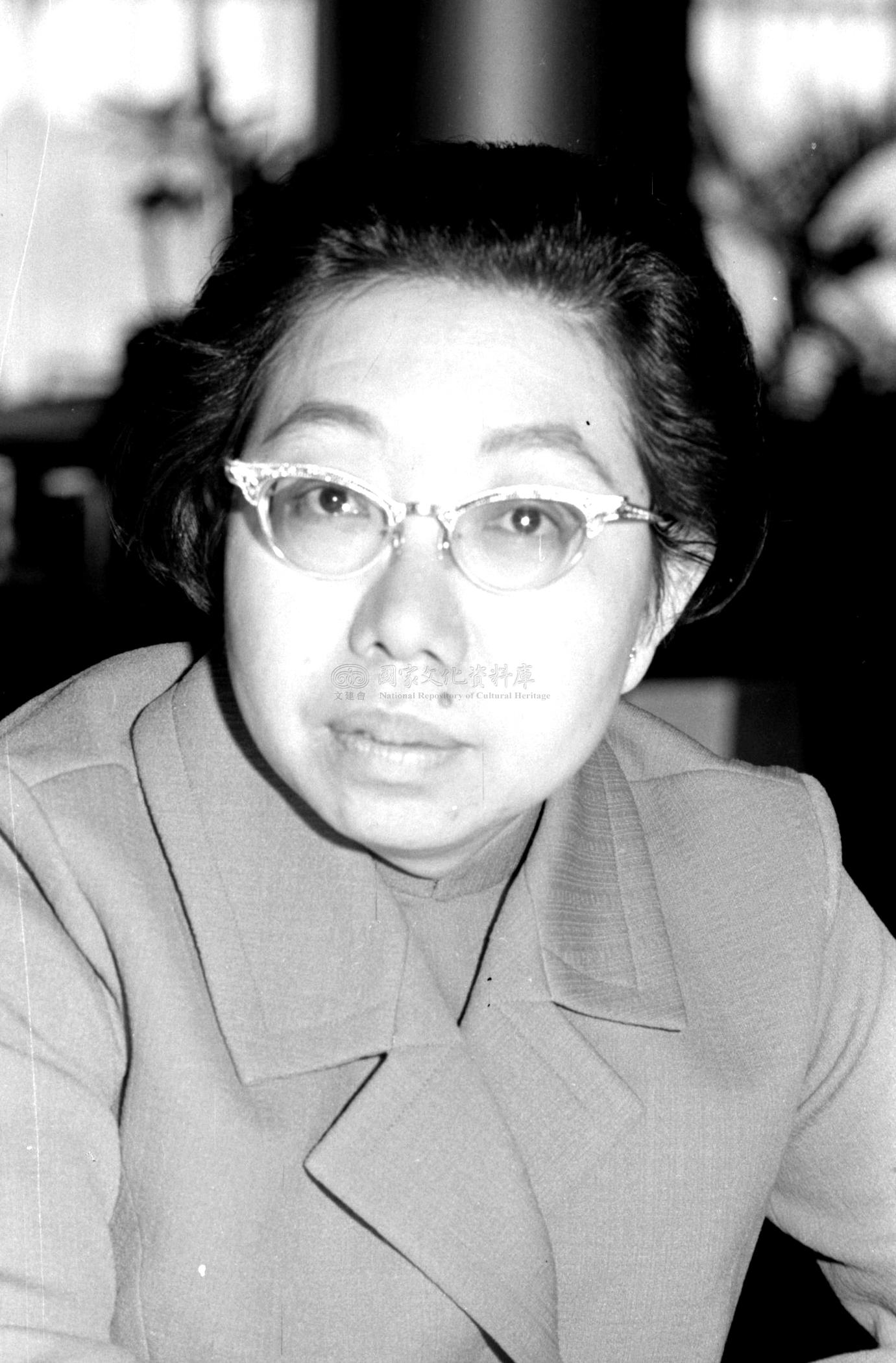
- Born: 1932 (age 92–93); Rangoon, Burma, British Raj
- Occupation: Entrepreneur

Aw Sian
- Chinese: 胡仙
Transcriptions
Standard Mandarin
- Hanyu Pinyin: Hú Xiān
Yue: Cantonese
- Yale Romanization: Wùh Sīn
- Jyutping: Wu^{4} Sin^{1}

Aw Sian also known as Sally Aw, OBE, DStJ, JP, (born 1932) is a Hong Kong businesswoman and daughter of the Burmese-born entrepreneur and newspaper proprietor Aw Boon-haw. Sally Aw was nicknamed Tiger Balm Lady as well as Chinese Howard Hughes.

== Early life ==
Sally Aw was born in Rangoon in 1932 during the British Raj. At age 5, Sally was adopted by fellow relative Aw Boon Haw.

Aw Boon-haw's third son, Aw Hoe, was killed in a plane crash in 1951, and after his own death in 1954, Aw Sian, then 22, inherited the newspaper empire of Hong Kong.

Aw was known foremost as a media mogul, proprietor of the English language business newspaper The Standard and the Chinese language news group Sing Tao Holdings, including Sing Tao Daily and Sing Tao Wan Pao, founded by her father in 1938, as well as Express News (Chinese: 快報) she founded in 1963 and Tin Tin Daily News she owned via Sing Tao Holdings' listed subsidiary Culturecom Holdings (better known as its Hong Kong subsidiary Jademan Holdings)

Due to the Asian financial crisis and a corruption case in which she was named co-conspirator in 1998, Aw was forced to sell her media interests.

In 1997, Aw was appointed to be a delegate to the Chinese People's Political Consultative Conference from the Hong Kong Special Administrative Region.

== Industry recognition ==
In 1988, she won the Carr Van Anda Award from the E.W. Scripps School of Journalism at Ohio University. The award, named after the former managing editor of the New York Times, is awarded yearly for journalism contributions. Aw was given the award for building Sing Tao into an international Chinese-language newspaper.
