= Chinese Commercial News =

Chinese-language newspaper in the Philippines

- The front page of the Chinese Commercial News on June 5, 2020
- Native name: 菲律賓商報
- Type: Daily newspaper
- Format: Broadsheet
- Owner(s): Yuyitung Communications, Inc.
- Publisher: Solomon Yuyitung
- Editor-in-chief: Solomon Yuyitung
- Founded: October 1919; 106 years ago
- Language: Chinese (mainly traditional)
- Headquarters: Binondo, Manila, Philippines
- Website: www.shangbao.com.ph

The Chinese Commercial News (traditional Chinese: 菲律賓商報; simplified Chinese: 菲律宾商报; pinyin: Fēilǜbīn Shāngbào; Pe̍h-ōe-jī: Hui-li̍p-pin Siong-pò, lit. "Philippine Commercial News"), colloquially called the Commercial News or Siong Po (Pe̍h-ōe-jī: Siong-pò; lit. 'Commercial News' in Hokkien), is a Chinese language daily broadsheet newspaper in the Philippines. Although it is not the Philippines' first Chinese-language newspaper, it is the Philippines' oldest existing Chinese-language newspaper, and the country's third-oldest existing newspaper overall. The newspaper is a partner of China News Service of the United Front Work Department.

== History ==
=== 1919 establishment ===
The Chinese Commercial News was founded in October 1919 as the Huachiao Commercial News (traditional Chinese: 華僑商報; simplified Chinese: 华侨商报; pinyin: Huáqiáo Shāngbào; Pe̍h-ōe-jī: Hôa-kiâu Siong-pò), a monthly newsletter for the Manila Chinese Chamber of Commerce, then headed by Dee Cheng Chuan, with Yu Yi Tung (于以同) as the newspaper's first editor. The newspaper was founded because in the aftermath of World War I, the Philippines, then a colony of the United States, experienced rapid economic growth, which precipitated the need for a newspaper which would monitor the country's latest business developments for the large Chinese Filipino merchant class. Its first issue was published on Christmas Day, December 25, 1919.

=== Shift to daily publication ===
In February 1922, the last monthly newsletter was published, and the Commercial News became a daily newspaper two months later, when ownership of the newspaper was transferred to the newly established Chinese Commercial News Publishing Company (華僑商報出版公司), established by Go Ki Hoc (吳紀霍). Its initial print run consisted of two pages and a circulation of one thousand copies, with foreign and local news translated from local English newspapers. In 1927, the Commercial News became the first Chinese newspaper to print a pictorial, and it began printing a weekly magazine in 1933.

=== World War II ===
Production of the newspaper was interrupted during World War II: refusing to publish the Commercial News as a propaganda organ for the Japanese, Yu Yi Tung was executed and the newspaper shut down.

=== Postwar re-establishment ===
The newspaper restarted publication on April 15, 1945, despite the lack of resources, by Yu Yi Tung's children: Quintin Yu Tiong Seng (于長城), Rizal Yu Tiong Keng (于長庚), Helen Yu Un Hui (于茵慧) and Yu Tiong Nay (于長籟).

=== Martial law under Ferdinand Marcos ===
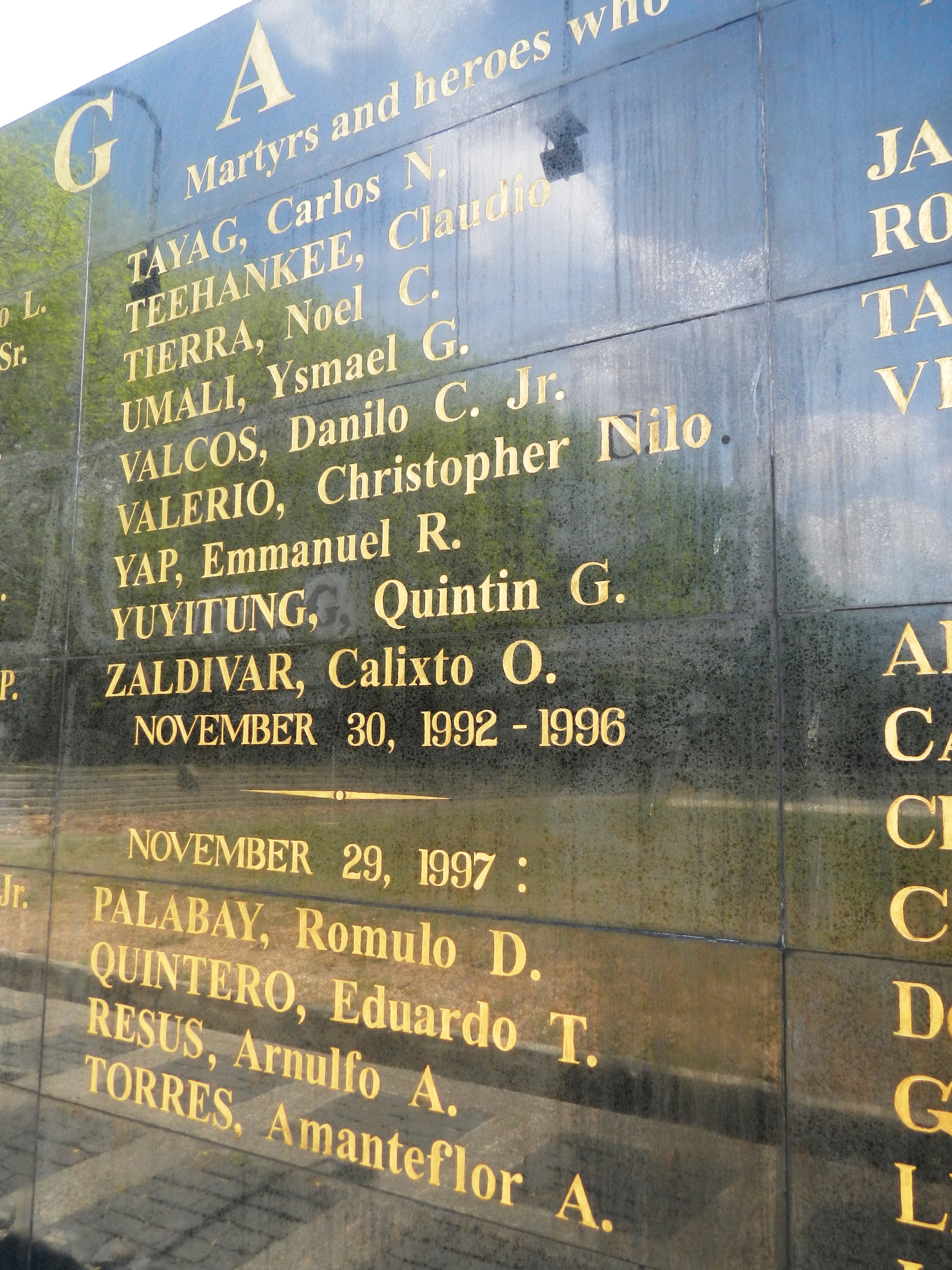
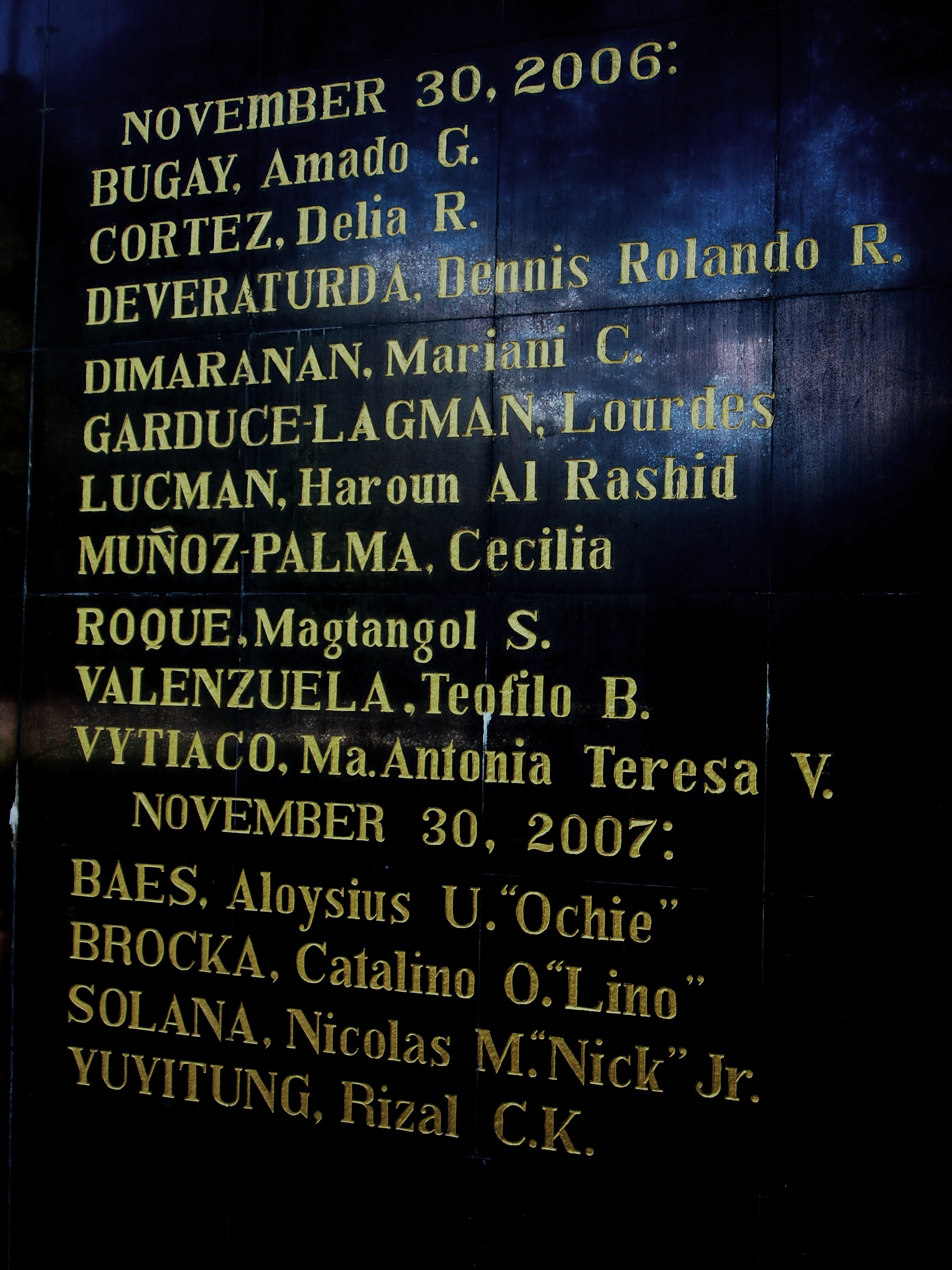
Details of the Wall of Remembrance at the Bantayog ng mga Bayani, showing the names of two separate batches of Bantayog Honorees, including that of Quintin (left/top) and Rizal Yuyitung (right/bottom).

In 1969, the paper covered the allegations of fraud during the Ferdinand Marcos' re-election in the 1969 Philippine presidential election. In 1970, covered the various protests which eventually came to be known as the First Quarter Storm, and warned about the likelihood that Marcos would declare martial law. By this time, the Yuyitungs were already controversial for advocating that the local Chinese community become more closely integrated into mainstream Philippine society, which was interpreted as supporting the People's Republic of China at a time when Filipino politicians were caught up with the Red Scare which was sweeping the politics of America and its allies. The paper itself became controversial for printing reports about events in mainland China, which had been translated from western news agencies but which were nevertheless red-tagged as "pro-communist."

In May 1970, the Marcos government picked up Quintin and Rizal Yuyitung and deported them to Taiwan, where Rizal was sentenced to jail for three years and Quintin for two years.

The paper, temporarily managed by friends of the family, continued publishing until the issuance of Proclamation № 1081 on September 21, 1972, which placed the Philippines under martial law and all media outlets, including the Commercial News, were shut down by the regime of Ferdinand Marcos.

Since the Philippines was already under martial law when they were released from jail, Rizal and Quinitin Yuyitung temporarily moved to North America.

=== Post-martial law years ===
The Yuyitung family restarted publication of the newspaper after the People Power Revolution on June 12, 1986: the only pre-martial law Chinese-language newspaper to do so.

The Commercial News launched its website in 1995, becoming one of the first Chinese newspapers to be available on the Internet. The newspaper maintains a partnership with China News Service, a news service of the United Front Work Department of the Central Committee of the Chinese Communist Party.

== Editorial policy ==
In the 1960s, the Commercial News advocated for the assimilation of Chinese Filipinos into the wider Filipino community and Philippine recognition of the People's Republic of China. This angered Chinese Filipinos sympathetic to Taiwan, who viewed residence in the Philippines and the acquisition of Filipino citizenship as a convenience while awaiting return to mainland China. This advocacy led to the clandestine arrest of both Quintin and Rizal Yuyitung and their deportation to Taiwan in 1970 by the anti-communist Marcos government. Ironically, Marcos followed through on the advocacy of the Commercial News, even extending diplomatic recognition to the PRC in 1975.
