= Center for International Media Assistance =

Non-governmental Organization based in Washington, DC

- Founded: 2006
- Purpose: Media development
- Headquarters: Washington, DC, United States
- Website: www.cima.ned.org

The Center for International Media Assistance (CIMA) is an initiative of the National Endowment for Democracy in the United States. CIMA works to improve the development of independent media worldwide while working to strengthen the support for such development. The center works to improve the effectiveness of existing media development efforts by conducting research and bringing together a broad range of experts to share their experiences. CIMA's mission is based on the conviction that free and independent media play an indispensable role in developing sustainable democracies around the world.

== History ==
The authorization to start CIMA was first introduced in the Intelligence Reform and Terrorism Prevention Act of 2004 in order to create an establishment of a media network that would ensure the promotion of freedom of the press and freedom of the media worldwide, respect journalistic identity, and ensure that widely accepted standards for professional and ethical journalistic and editorial practices are employed when assessing international media. This media network, later established as CIMA, was aimed to provide an effective forum to convene a broad range of individuals, organizations, and governmental participants involved in journalistic activities and the development of free and independent media.

The secretary of state authorizes grants for the such funding of a media network through the National Endowment for Democracy to manage a free and independent media network.

This media network was proposed as the Center for International Media Assistance in a proposal by the National Endowment for Democracy to the Bureau of Democracy, Human Rights, and Labor—the United States Department of State's largest single funder of independent media. Since the founding of the National Endowment for Democracy, media has played an important role in promoting democracy for the National Endowment for Democracy, with around $14 million annually going to support media development.

In 2006, CIMA was founded as an initiative of the National Endowment for Democracy with encouragement from Congress and a grant from the State Department's Bureau of Democracy, Human Rights and Labor.

== Reports ==
In 2024, CIMA and the Global Forum for Media Development worked with the OECD to produce a report on how to support media development.
