= Sing Tao News Corporation =

Hong Kong public media company

Sing Tao News Corporation Limited
- Formerly: Perfect Treasure Holdings; Global China Technology; Global China Group Holdings
- Company type: Public
- Traded as: SEHK: 1105
- Industry: Media
- Founded: 1996
- Headquarters: Hong Kong
- Key people: Kwok Ying-shing (Chairman)
- Products: Sing Tao Daily; The Standard; Headline Daily
- Website: singtaonewscorp.com/en/

Sing Tao News Corporation
- Traditional Chinese: 星島新聞集團有限公司
- Simplified Chinese: 星岛新闻集团有限公司
Transcriptions
Standard Mandarin
- Hanyu Pinyin: Xīngdǎo Xīnwén Jítuán Yǒuxiàn Gōngsī
Yue: Cantonese
- Jyutping: sing1 dou2 san1 man4 zaap6 tyun4 jau5 haan6 gung1 si1

Global China Group Holdings Limited
- Traditional Chinese: 泛華集團控股有限公司
- Simplified Chinese: 泛华集团控股有限公司
Transcriptions
Yue: Cantonese
- Jyutping: faan3 waa4 zaap6 tyun4 hung3 gu2 jau5 haan6 gung1 si1

Sing Tao News Corporation Limited (Sing Tao) is a Hong Kong media company, incorporated in Bermuda. It was formerly called Global China Group Holdings Limited.

== History ==
The Group, which is listed on the Stock Exchange of Hong Kong, was founded in 1996, under the name Perfect Treasure Holdings Limited and would go on to acquire and take on the name of the much older Sing Tao newspaper.

Perfect Treasure was acquired by Charles Ho and renamed to Global China Technology Group Limited in mid-2000. The following January, Global China Technology Group acquired a 51.36% majority holding in Sing Tao Holdings from private equity fund Lazard Asia and Ho became executive chairman of both Global China Technology Group and Sing Tao Holdings. In 2002, Sing Tao Holdings was fully acquired by GCT.

The company was then renamed again, from Global China Technology Group to Global China Group Holdings Limited, on 4 October 2002. At this time its business interests included the distribution of Nikon cameras and the provision of broadband services, in China, along with the newly acquired Sing Tao media stable.

=== Sing Tao News Corporation ===
Ho had been honorary chairman of Sing Tao Holdings since September 1999, when it was acquired by Lazard Asia after struggling under founder-family member Sally Aw.

In mid-2002 the Sing Tao subsidiary, excluding Sing Tao Media Holdings, which held the Sing Tao newspaper, and Colony Hotel, was sold on to Ming Yuan Investment Group, a private company owned by Yao Yuan.

Sing Tao Holdings became known as Shanghai Mingyuan Holdings, from October 2002. Sing Tao Media Holdings was an intermediate company for newspaper and magazine business of the former Sing Tao Holdings group. In early 2002, Sing Tao Media acquired the Hong Kong magazines 'Teens' and 'East Touch', as founding titles in the magazine publishing division of the group.

The predecessors of Sing Tao Holdings as the parent company of Sing Tao group, was Sing Tao Limited (aka: Sing Tao Newspapers Limited and Sin Poh Amalgamated (H.K.) Limited). As of 2018, Sing Tao Limited still operated as a company and a subsidiary of Sing Tao News Corporation.

In 2003, Colony Hotel, which the company partially owned, was sold to the University of Toronto.

On 22 February 2005, Global China Group Holdings was renamed to Sing Tao News Corporation. In the same year Sing Tao sold the headquarters of its newspaper division in Kowloon Bay, Kowloon. The headquarters was later relocated to A Kung Ngam in Hong Kong Island. In 2017, the headquarters was relocated to Tseung Kwan O.

=== Charles Ho relinquishes control ===
In February 2021, Ho sold a 28 percent stake in Sing Tao News Corporation to Kwok Hiu-ting (Guo Xiaoting), vice chairwoman of mainland property management firm Kaisa Prosperity, for HK$370 million. Kwok, born 1994, who is the daughter of Kwok Ying-shing (郭英成), chairman of the mainland property firm, Kaisa Group, instantly became the majority shareholder, up from zero. Ho retained just three percent of the company.

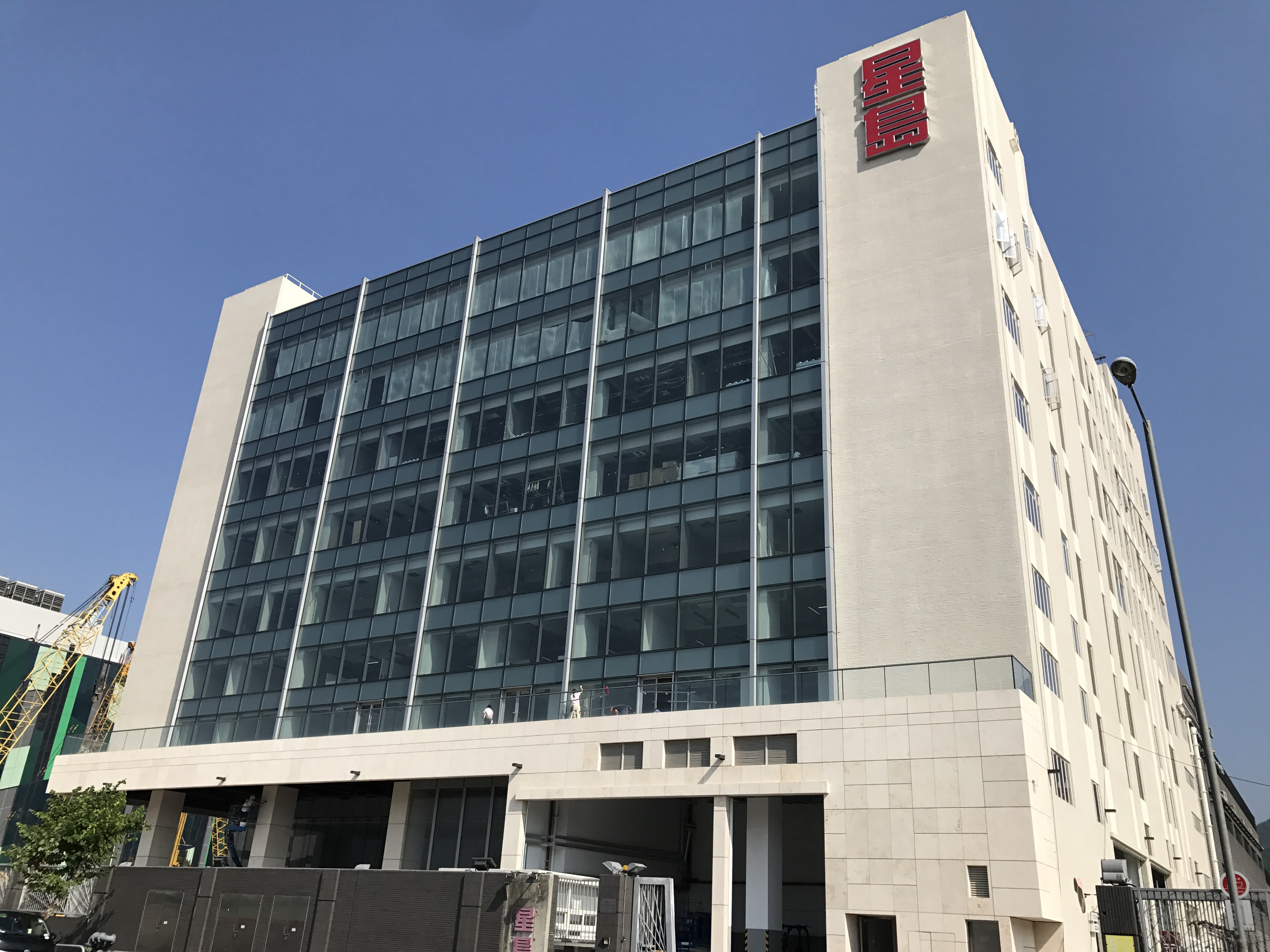
Sing Tao News Corporation building in Tseung Kwan O

== Publications ==
- newspapers
  - Sing Tao Daily
  - The Standard
  - Headline Daily
  - Bastille Post
- magazines
  - East Week
  - East Touch
  - PC Market
  - Jet Magazine
  - Caz Buyer
  - Ohpama
  - Smart Choice Weekly

== See also ==
- Media in Hong Kong
