= Sing Tao Daily =

Chinese newspaper in Hong Kong

- Type: Daily newspaper
- Format: Broadsheet
- Owner: Sing Tao News Corporation
- Founded: 1938; 88 years ago
- Political alignment: Pro-Beijing (historically pro-ROC)
- Headquarters: 7 Chun Cheong Street, Tseung Kwan O Industrial Estate, Hong Kong; Overseas: 188 Lafayette Street, New York City 10013, United States
- Website: www.stheadline.com

Sing Tao Daily
- Traditional Chinese: 星島日報
- Simplified Chinese: 星岛日报
Transcriptions
Standard Mandarin
- Hanyu Pinyin: Xīngdǎo Rìbào
- Wade–Giles: Hsingtao Jihpao
- Tongyong Pinyin: Xīngdǎo Rìhbào
- Yale Romanization: Syīngdǎu R̀bàu
- IPA: [ɕíŋtàʊ ɻɻ̩̂pâʊ]
Yue: Cantonese
- Yale Romanization: Sīngdóu Yahtbou
- Jyutping: Sing1 dou2 jat6 bou3
- IPA: [ɕɪ́ŋtǒu jɐ̀tpōu]

The Sing Tao Daily (also known as Sing Tao Jih Pao; Chinese: 星島日報) is among Hong Kong's oldest Chinese language newspapers. It is owned by Sing Tao News Corporation, of which Kwok Ying-shing (Chinese: 郭英成) is chairman. Its English-language sister is the free newspaper The Standard.

Sing Tao's Toronto edition is partly owned by Star Media Group, the publisher of the Toronto Star, a Torstar Corporation company.

== History ==
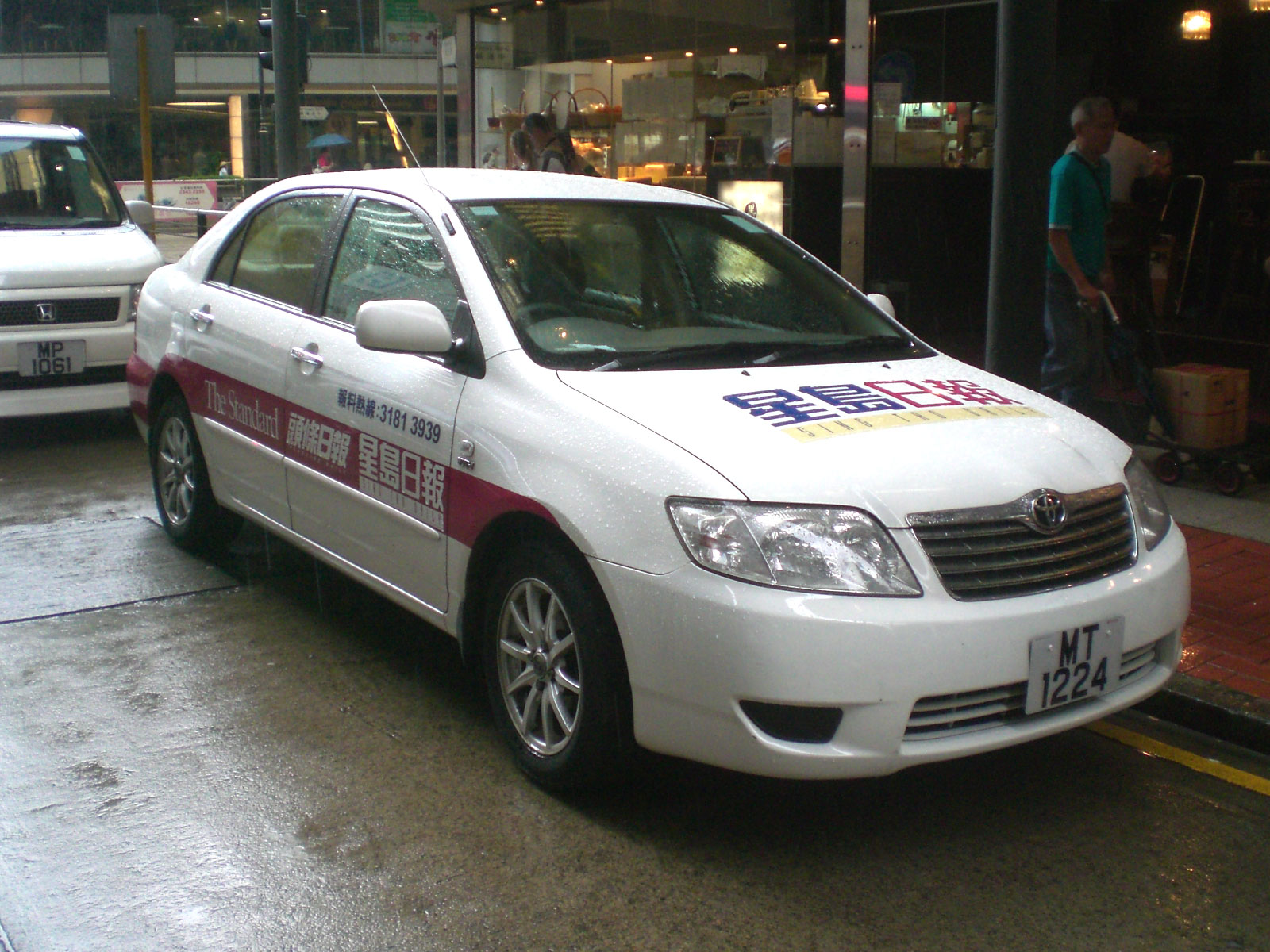
Passenger car with Sing Tao News Corporation livery

Sing Tao Daily is the oldest Chinese language daily newspaper in Hong Kong, having commenced publication on 1 August 1938.

The first overseas edition of the paper was launched in 1963 in San Francisco, where the group's first overseas office was set up in May 1964.

In 1992, Sing Tao Daily, encountering financial difficulties, established a joint publication with the International Culture Publishing Corporation, a front organization for China's Ministry of State Security according to Alex Joske.

Until 2002, the parent company of Sing Tao Daily was Sing Tao Holdings; since then it has been Sing Tao News Corporation.

In June 2021, a real estate developer's daughter from mainland China purchased a majority stake in the company.

In August 2021, the U.S. branch of Sing Tao Daily started to register as a foreign agent under the Foreign Agents Registration Act (FARA) at the order of the United States Department of Justice. The company said the incident involved libel and it would seek legal actions.

== Political stance ==
The Sing Tao has a long pro-government history. Before the handover of Hong Kong to China, it supported the Kuomintang and British Hong Kong government; and once Hong Kong was transferred and turned into a special administrative region, the paper turned its support to the Beijing government.

=== Reports of Chinese Communist Party influence ===
A 2001 article by the Jamestown Foundation claimed that two of Sing Tao's owners were members of Chinese People's Political Consultative Conference and one editor had previously worked for China Daily. According to a Hoover Institution report, Sing Tao has fallen under Beijing's control after being purchased by a pro-Beijing businessman in May 2001 and now aligns with that of Chinese state media. In 2013 an analyst at Freedom House wrote in a report submitted to the Center for International Media Assistance that in recent decades, several publications including Sing Tao showed patterns that signaled pressure within the media industry to reduce its criticism of the government, including "self-censorship", terminations of "high-risk" contributors, high turnover rates of journalists due to "unpalatable editorial policy", and subtle changes in the coverage of politically sensitive topics such as the Three Ts.

== See also ==
- Headline Daily
- Newspapers of Hong Kong
- Media in Hong Kong
- Newspaper Society of Hong Kong
- Hong Kong Audit Bureau of Circulations
- The Standard (Hong Kong)
- Sing Tao Daily (Canada)
