= List of Hong Kong national security cases in 2020 =

The list below shows cases concerning the National Security laws of Hong Kong in 2020, including arrests, charges, investigations and enforcement operations made or conducted under the national security laws.

The Law of the People's Republic of China on Safeguarding National Security in the Hong Kong Special Administrative Region (National Security Law, or NSL) was imposed by the National People's Congress of China and came into effect on 30 June 2020. A second national security legislation, the Safeguarding National Security Ordinance (National Security Ordinance, SNSO), was enacted by the Legislative Council of Hong Kong to implement Article 23 of Hong Kong's constitution, the Basic Law, and took effect on 23 March 2024. The police operations involving national security elements are conducted by the National Security Department of the Hong Kong Police Force (National Security Department, NSD) in spite of suspected crimes neither related to the NSL nor the national security ordinance.

As of 1 September 2026, a total of 415 individuals had been arrested on suspicion of acts and activities endangering national security since the national security law was enacted, some of whom have been sentenced to jail.

== Cases ==
=== Handover protest and Tong Ying-kit (1 July 2020) ===
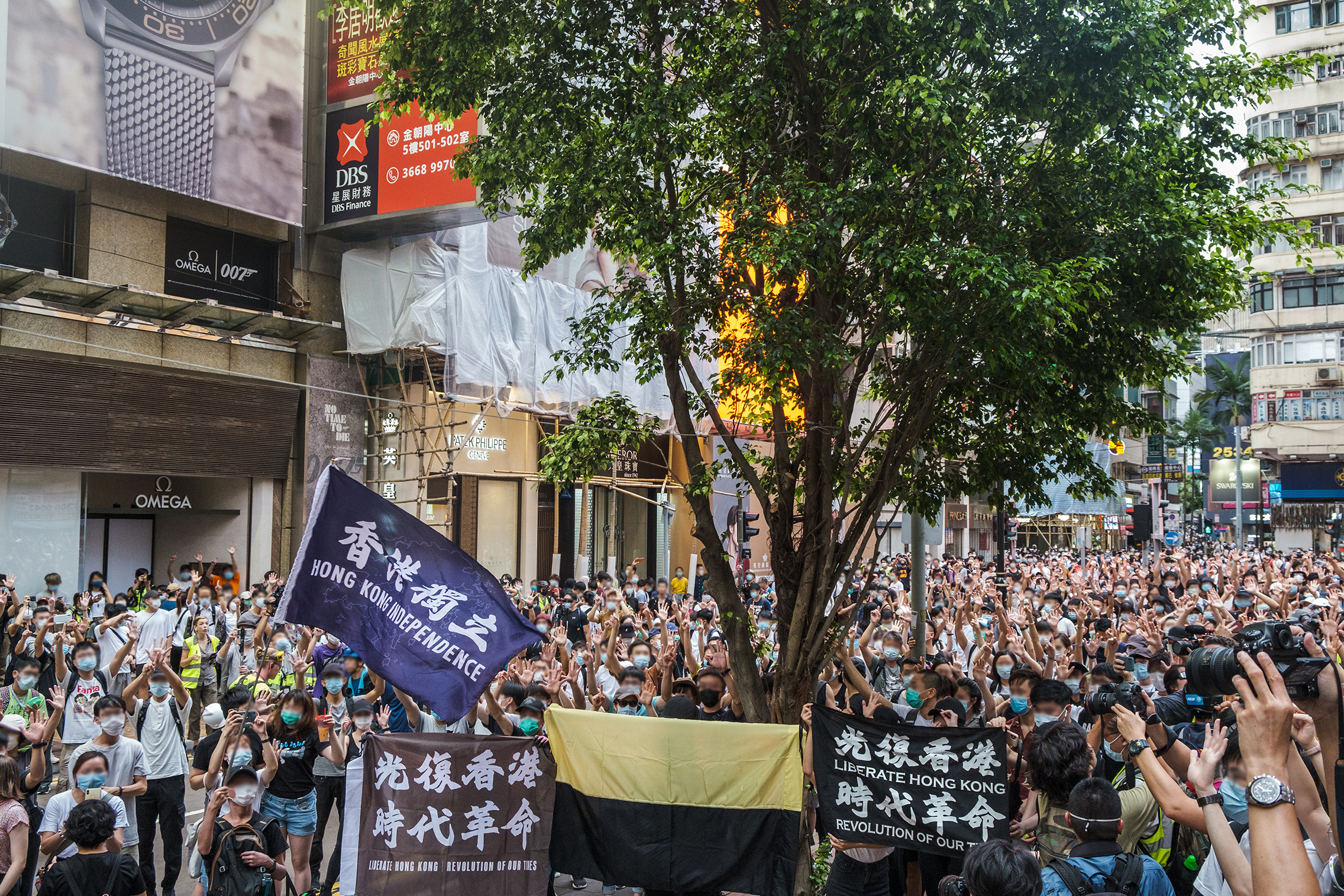
Pro-independence and Liberate Hong Kong slogans held during 2020 handover protest

Thousands of protesters gathered on Hong Kong Island on 1 July 2020, the twenty-third anniversary of the handover of Hong Kong, in opposition to the NSL which had come into effect in the late evening of the previous day. The 1 July march was banned by the police for the first time. Police displayed purple flags to warn protesters against violations of the NSL. The first arrest for an alleged breach of the national security law was made by police in Causeway Bay, where a man had been found to be in possession of a Hong Kong independence flag. On one photo posted by police on Twitter, he was seen wearing a black T-shirt with the words "Free Hong Kong" written on it. Netizens found that in a photo, two barely visible words, "no to", were written in front of the printed words "Hong Kong independence".

10 arrests were made by the Police for national security related offences, including a girl aged 15 for waving a pro-independence banner. The only one charged was Tong Ying-kit, who in that afternoon drove a motorcycle with a flag bearing the slogan "Liberate Hong Kong, revolution of our times" in Wan Chai and injured three officers. Charged with "committing incitement to secession" and "terrorist activities" on 3 July, Tong became the first defendant under the new NSL. He was repeatedly denied bail. Secretary of Justice Teresa Cheng informed Tong on 5 February 2021 that his case would be tried without a jury, instead by three NSL-designated judges. Tong challenged Cheng's decision but was rejected by the Court of Appeal on 22 June 2021.

The trial began on 23 June 2021. Tong pleaded not guilty to all charges, including a new, alternative charge for terrorism of "dangerous driving causing grievous bodily harm". The question of whether the "Liberate Hong Kong" slogan had a separatist connotation was considered by some observers as being at the center of the case, taking up a full week of debate during the 15-day trial. The judges did not deliver a clear-cut verdict on it, saying that the deciding factor was the intent of the one who used the slogan. The High Court found Tong guilty on the two charges and sentenced him to a total of 9 years in prison in July. Tong withdrew the appeal by January 2022 for unspecified reasons, reportedly by writing a letter from prison. In July 2022, Tong was ordered by the Department of Justice to pay court fees of over HK$1.38 million for his failed legal bids.

| Name / Surname | Age | Accused of | Status |
|---|---|---|---|
| Tong Ying-kit (Note: First to be charged under the NSL) | 23 | Inciting secession, terrorist activities | Found guilty jail for 9 years |
| Raphael Cheung Hing-lung (Note: First to be arrested under the NSL) | 38 | Inciting secession | Not charged |
| Chow (female) | 67 | Inciting secession | Not charged |
| Shum Lit-cheong | 24 | Inciting secession | Not charged |
| Unknown | 23 | Secession | Not charged |
| Unknown (female) | 36 | Inciting secession | Not charged |
| Unknown (female) | 36 | Inciting secession | Not charged |
| Eileen Ho Cheuk-lam | 15 | Inciting secession | Not charged |
| Unknown | 19 | Inciting secession | Not charged |
| Unknown | 26 | Inciting secession | Not charged |

=== Yuen Long attack anniversary (21 July 2020) ===
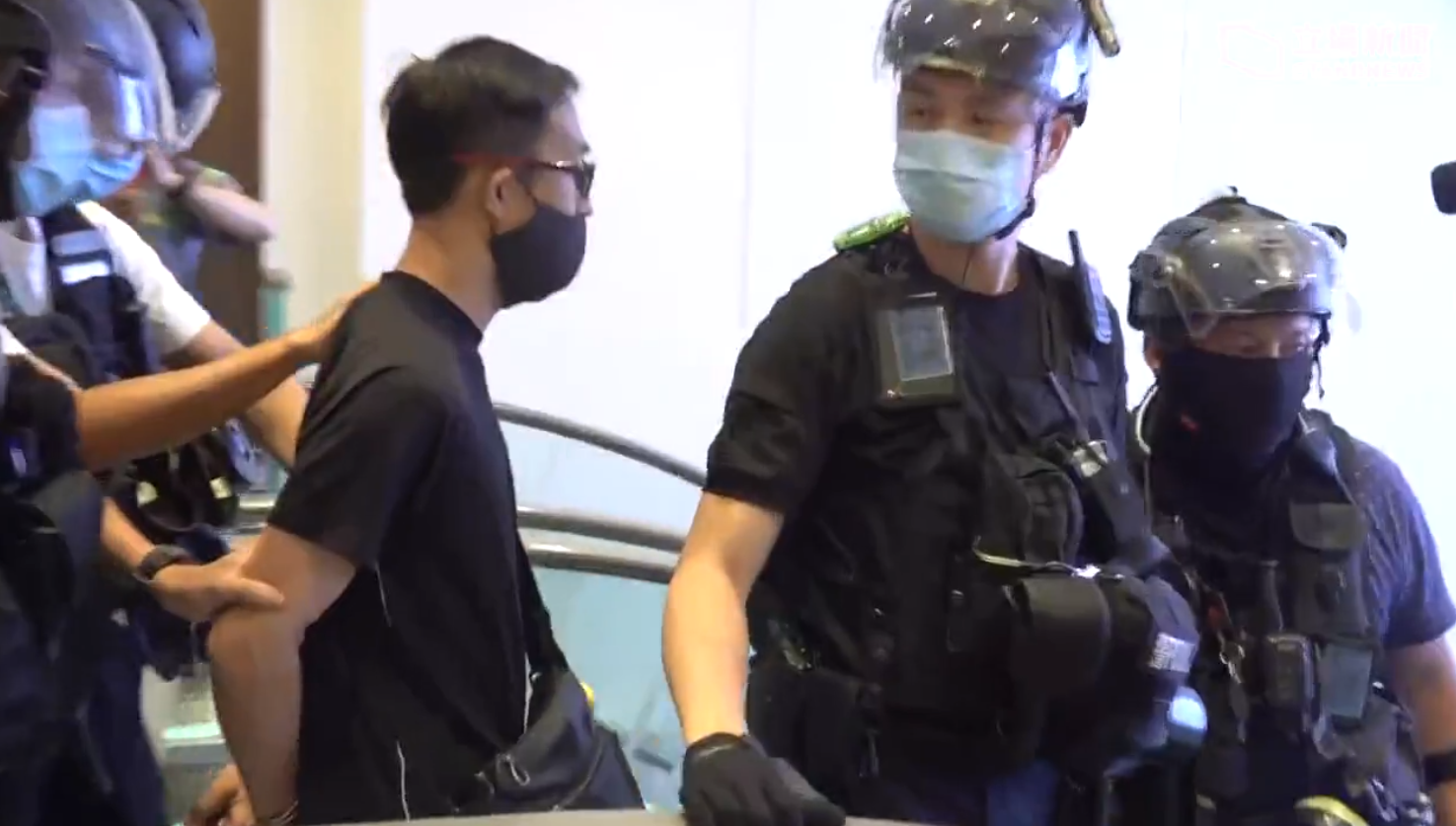
Rayman Chow arrested after showing Liberate Hong Kong slogan

On 21 July 2020, a year after the Yuen Long attack, citizens gathered in Yoho Mall chanting slogans. Kwai Tsing District Councillor Rayman Chow Wai-hung was arrested after police suspected him breaching the NSL by inciting secession for holding up the slogan "Liberate Hong Kong, revolution of our time", but released on bail and not charged.

| Name | Age | Accused of | Status |
|---|---|---|---|
| Rayman Chow Wai-hung (Note: First District Councillor to be arrested under the NSL) | 52 | Inciting secession | Not charged |

=== Studentlocalism (29 July 2020) ===
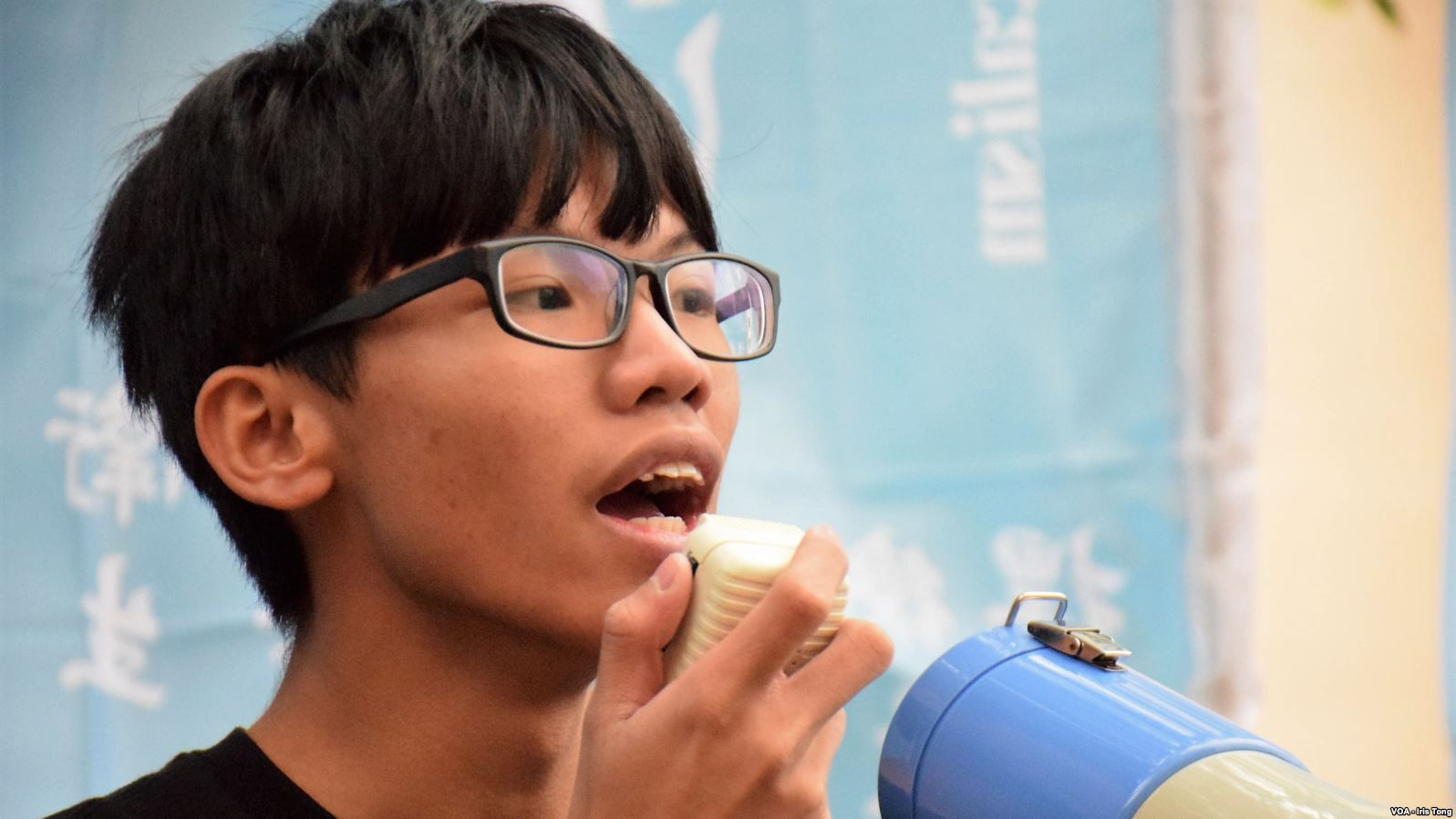
Tony Chung, pro-independence student activist

Studentlocalism, a pro-independence Hong Kong student activist group, dissolved its Hong Kong headquarter hours before the NSL was imposed, announcing that it intended to continue its operations from Taiwan, Australia and the US. Despite so, Tony Chung, co-founder and last convenor of the group, along with former spokesman Ho Nok-hang, former members Yanni Ho and William Chan, were arrested on 29 July 2020 on suspicion of breaching the NSL through inciting secession. Senior superintendent Steve Li said the same day that the arrests were based on the content on social media accounts, which he did not specify but were speculated to be those of the "Inititative Independence Party". That group itself claimed to have been founded by former members based overseas. Chung was said by the prosecution, Ivan Cheung, to be the administrator of the Inititative Independence Party and of the Facebook page of the U.S. branch of Studentlocalism. it also accused him of having violated the NSL after it came into force. The four were granted bail two days later; Chung was asked to delete posts on social media and claimed to have had a saliva sample taken by police.

Chung, Yanni Ho and William Chan were arrested again for inciting secession on 27 October 2020, after Chung had reportedly been denied entry to the U.S. Consulate General for asylum. Tim Luk, a former member of the group, was also arrested for assisting fugitives on 9 November 2020. Ho Nok-hang, Yanni Ho and Chan were unconditionally released, marking the first such instances since the NSL had come into force, and had their passports returned on 18 January 2021.

Chung was formally charged with secession, money laundering, and conspiracy to publish seditious materials. He was the second individual facing charges under the NSL, denied bail, and ordered to remain in custody until his next appearance in court on 7 January 2021. While remanded in custody, Chung was sentenced to four months in jail for desecrating the PRC national flag – a charge which he had denied, arguing that he had been unaware that it was a PRC national flag – and unlawful assembly. Chung was given a 43-month jail sentence on 23 November 2021 for secession and money laundering.

Chung was released in June 2023, and fled to Britain in December that year. An arrest warrant was issued in December 2024 against him for secession and collusion during his self-imposed exile.

| Name | Age | Accused of | Status |
|---|---|---|---|
| Tony Chung Hon-lam (Note: First political figure to be arrested under the NSL) | 19 | Inciting secession | Pleaded guilty jailed for 3 years, 7 months for: Secession; Money laundering |
| Yanni Ho Yan-nok | 17 | Inciting secession | Not charged |
| Ho Nok-hang | 21 | Inciting secession | Not charged |
| William Chan Wai-jin | 16 | Inciting secession | Not charged |
| Tim Luk Hoi-tin | 34 | Non NSL offence | Not charged |

=== Apple Daily (10 August 2020) ===
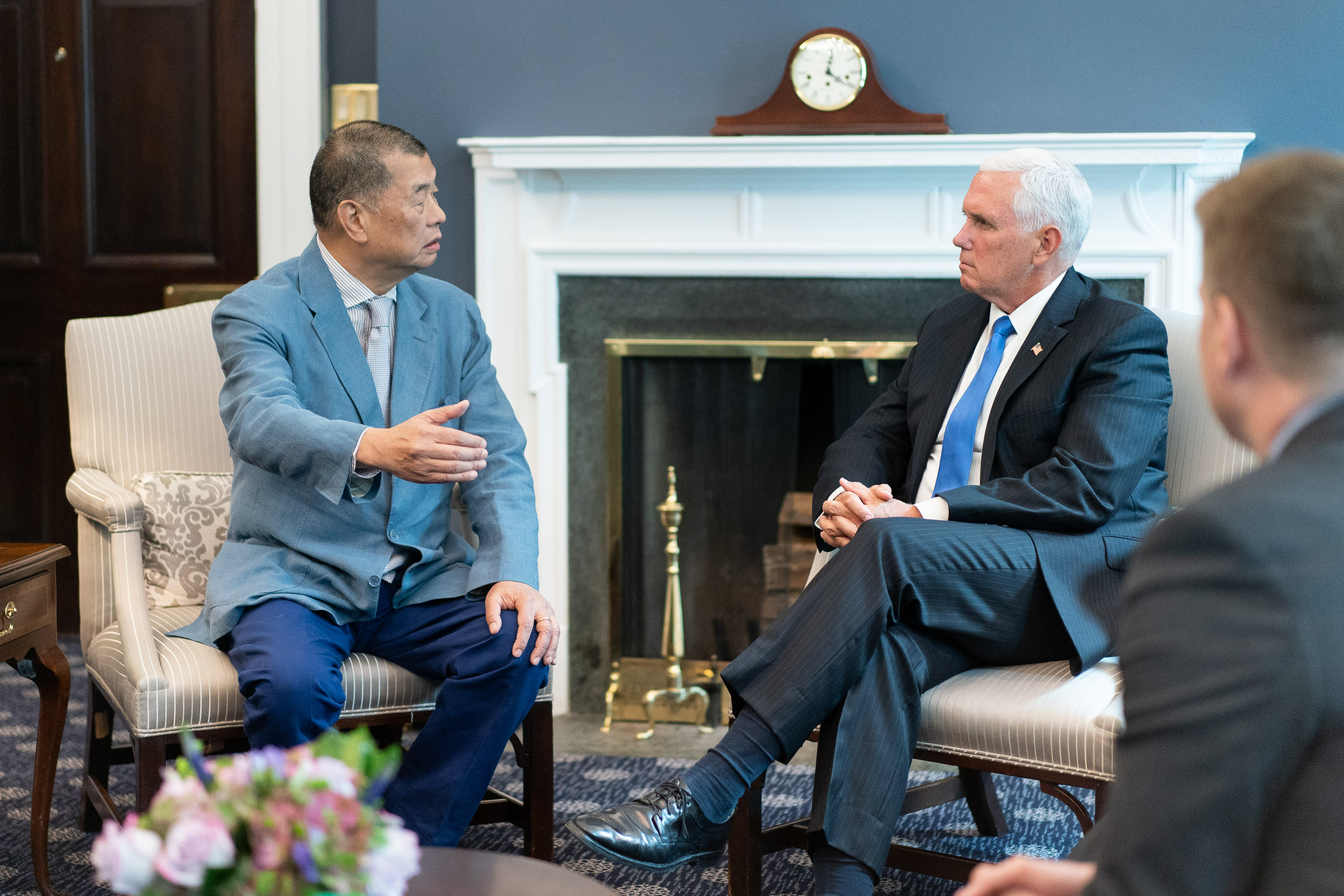
Meeting between Jimmy Lai, founder of Apple Daily, and Mike Pence, Vice President of the United States. Lai was later accused of collusion.

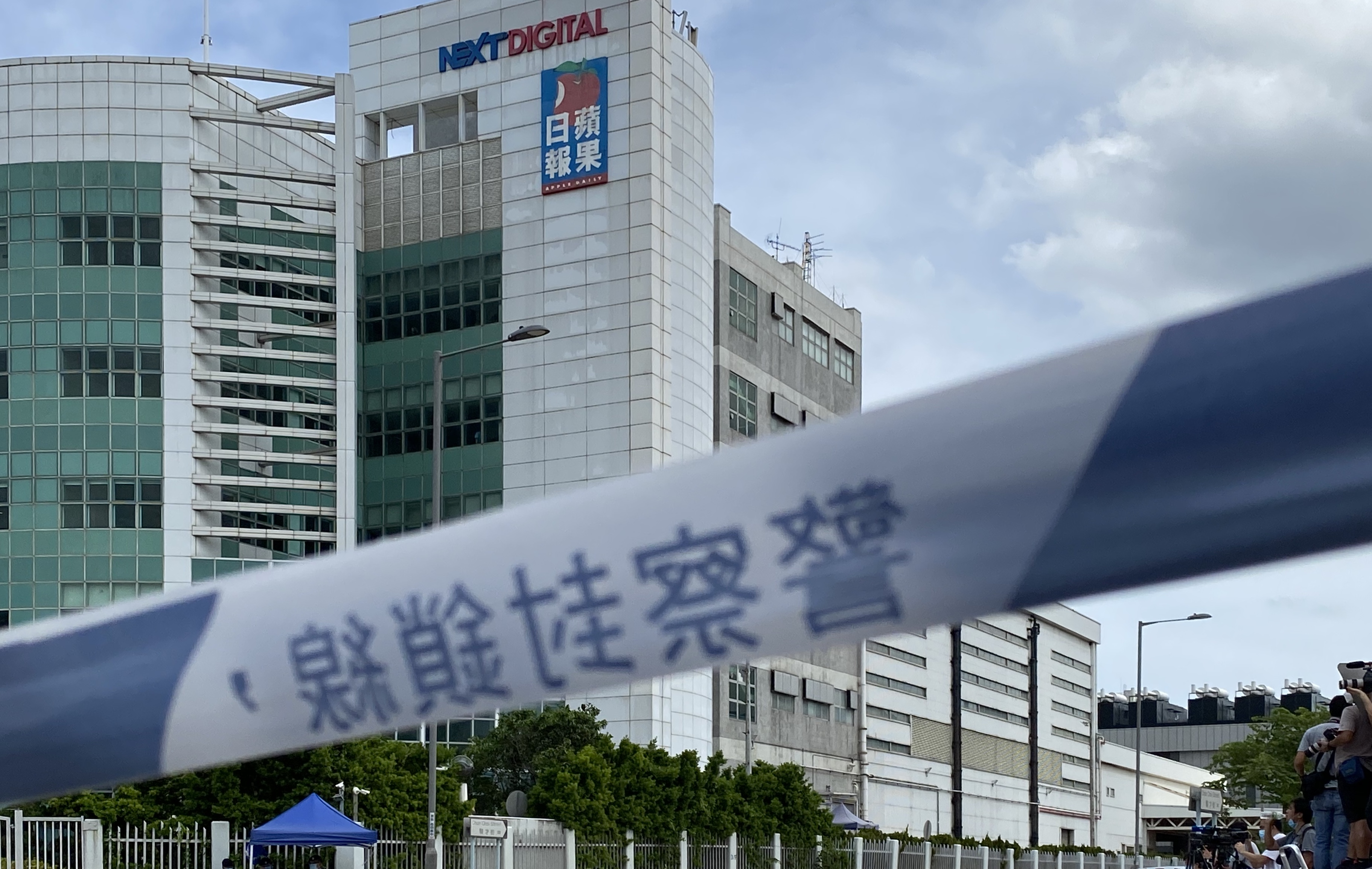
Headquarter of Apple Daily cordoned off during the August 2020 police raid

Executives of Next Digital, the parent company of pro-democracy newspaper Apple Daily, were arrested on 10 August 2020 and the offices of the newspaper were raided by over 100 police officers on the same day. Founder of Next Digital Jimmy Lai and his two sons, Timothy and Ian, were arrested along with CEO Cheung Kim-hung, CFO Royston Chow, administrative director Wong Wai-keung, and animation director Kith Ng. Lai and his sons were arrested for suspected collusion with foreign forces under the NSL, while the four senior executives were arrested for suspected collusion with foreign and external forces as well as conspiracy to defraud. Jimmy Lai's private secretary Mark Simon, a foreign national, was reportedly wanted under the law. Lai was accused of financing groups advocating sanctions against Hong Kong, although police did not immediately name the group or the media company involved. He and the executives were released on bail.

On 2 December 2020, Lai was arrested again and formally charged with fraud the next day. He was denied bail by court and remanded in custody. While waiting for the bail hearing, Lai was charged again for colluding with foreign forces on 11 December. Lai was allowed to leave from custody on 23 December by court. The Department of Justice (DOJ) of the Government immediately appealed to the top court, while pro-Beijing media and government mouthpieces strongly criticised the decision of letting Lai leaving the detention centre. Lai, on 31 December, was sent to jail again after the court decided to consider the appeal, and the government won on 9 February 2021. A subsequent bail application by Lai was denied on 19 February. He faced additional charges and was jailed, together with other democracy activists, on 16 April 2021 to 14 months in prison for his participation in protests on 18 and 31 August 2019.

Stephen Ting, former executive director at Next Digital, was arrested on 2 March 2021 by the NSD, accused of fraud, and was released on bail.

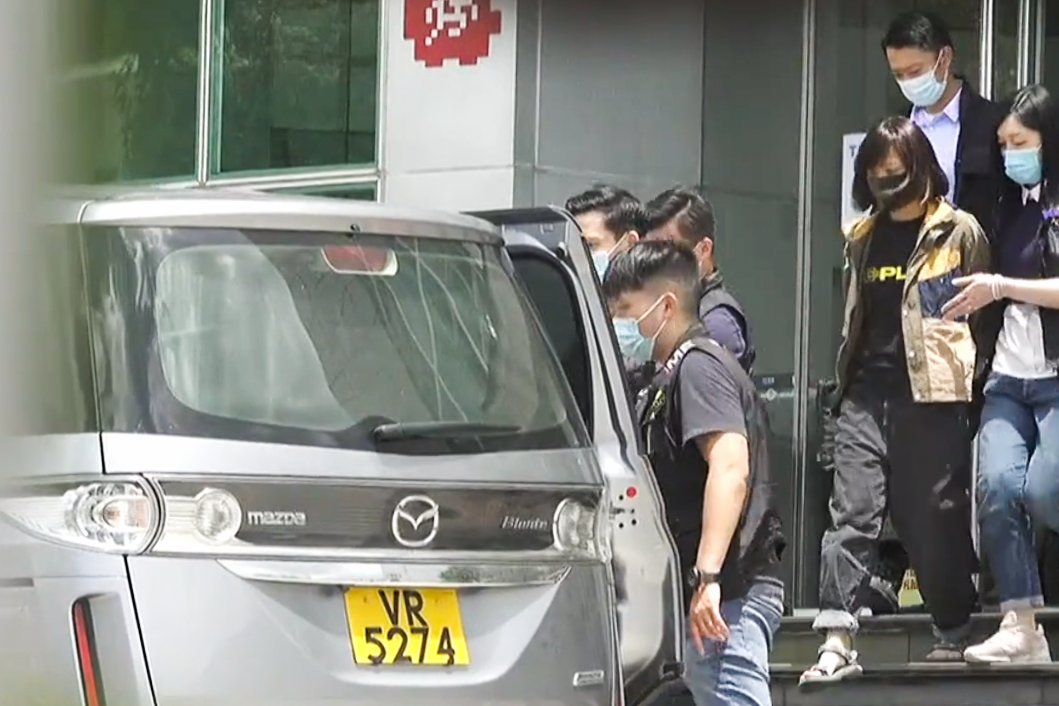
Chan Pui-man, Associate Publisher of Apple Daily, arrested

Next Digital was reraided on 17 June 2021 and five senior Apple Daily staff arrested at their homes at around 7:00 a.m. on suspicion of collusion with foreign forces: chief executive officer Cheung Kim-hung; chief operating officer Royston Chow Tat-kuen; deputy chief editor Chan Pui-man; editor-in-chief Ryan Law Wai-kwong; and chief executive editor Nick Cheung Chi-wai. The police froze assets of three Apple Daily companies (Apple Daily Limited, Apple Daily Printing Limited, and AD Internet Limited) to the amount of 18 million HKD, and accused the media outlet of endangering national security through several articles urging foreign sanctions against Hong Kong and China; police demanded the removal of these articles. Cheung Kim-hung, Law Wai-kwong, and the three Apple Daily companies were formally charged with collusion, marking the first time news media and companies faced national security charges. Bails for Cheung and Law were denied on 19 June, while the three other senior executives had been granted bail the evening before. Apple Daily opinion writer Yeung Ching-kee (or Yeung Ching-Kei), known under the pen name Li Ping, was arrested on 23 June 2021 and later bailed out, also accused of collusion with foreign forces.

Apple Daily cited an increasingly risky environment and limited financial resources as reasons to cease publication with its 24 June 2021 issue. All social media accounts and its website vanished after midnight on 23 June. Editorial writer Fung Wai-kong was arrested at the airport on 27 June en route to Britain; this was the seventh arrest of an Apple Daily staff in the crackdown. Chan, Fung, Yeung, and Lam Man-chung, former executive editor-in-chief of Apple Daily, were arrested on 21 July 2021 – the former three having their bail granted the previous month revoked – and formally charged with collusion. All defendants on 28 December 2021 faced the new charge of sedition, specifically the distribution of "seditious publications" in the period from April 2019 to 24 June 2021. Chan Pui-man was arrested for the third time and jailed the next day in relation to the Stand News case. The trial of this case became the third national security cases to proceed without a jury. Following the cease of operations and the arrest of executives, Next Digital was liquidated on 15 December 2021 after a petition filed under Companies Ordinance by the Financial Secretary, Paul Chan Mo-po.

On 10 December 2022, Lai was sentenced in the fraud case on two charges to five years and nine months in jail and fined 2 million Hong Kong dollars (HKD), while Wong Wai-keung was jailed on one fraud charge to 21 months. In December 2025, Lai was found guilty on all charges. On 9 February 2026, Lai was sentenced to 20 years in prison, the harshest punishment handed by the national secutity judges so far; eight co-defendants were sentenced the same day. Lai and Wong later won the appeal to quash their fraud conviction.

| Name | Age | Accused of | Status |
|---|---|---|---|
| Apple Daily Limited (Note: First companies charged under the NSL) | N/A | Collusion | Found guilty Forced liquidation |
| Apple Daily Printing Limited | N/A | Collusion | Found guilty Forced liquidation |
| AD Internet Limited | N/A | Collusion | Found guilty Forced liquidation |
| Jimmy Lai Chee-ying | 71 | Collusion | Found guilty jailed for 20 years for: Collusion; Seditious publication |
| Jimmy Lai Chee-ying | 71 | Fraud (non NS) | Acquitted on appeal |
| Fung Wai-kong | 57 | Collusion | Pleaded guilty jailed for 10 years |
| Lam Man-chung | 51 | Collusion | Pleaded guilty jailed for 10 years |
| Yeung Ching-kee | 55 | Collusion | Pleaded guilty jailed for 7 years, 3 months |
| Chan Pui-man | 51 | Collusion | Pleaded guilty jailed for 7 years |
| Cheung Kim-hung | 59 | Collusion | Pleaded guilty jailed for 6 years, 9 months |
| Ryan Law Wai-kwong | 47 | Collusion | Pleaded guilty jailed for 6 years, 9 months |
| Wong Wai-keung | ? | Fraud (non NS) | Acquitted on appeal |
| Ian Lai Yiu-yan | 39 | Collusion | Not charged |
| Royston Chow Tat-kuen | 62 | Collusion | Not charged |
| Timothy Lai Kin-yang | ? | Non NSL offence | Not charged |
| Kith Ng Tat-kwong | ? | Non NSL offence | Not charged |
| Stephen Ting Ka-yu | 61 | Non NSL offence | Not charged |
| Nick Cheung Chi-wai | 53 | Collusion | Not charged |
| Mark Simon (Note: First foreigner wanted under the NSL) | ? | Collusion | Wanted |

=== Stand with Hong Kong (10 August 2020) ===
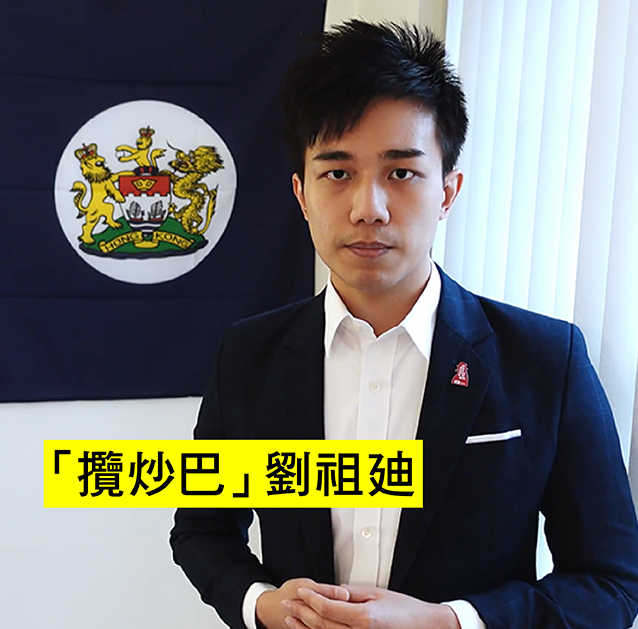
Finn Lau

In the course of investigations connected to Jimmy Lai Chee-ying, a group advocating for foreign countries to impose sanctions on Hong Kong was found by the NSD department of the police to have received, as per non-police sources reported by media, around 10 million HKD. Sources also said that the group in question was called "Fight for Freedom, Stand with Hong Kong". The group had at least four co-founders, among them Finn Lau, an activist exiled to the United Kingdom. Police said it had arrested six members of the group on 10 August 2020; two of them were Wilson Li Chung-chak and Andy Li Yu-hin. Lau was added to the police wanted list, along with Lai's right-hand man Mark Simon, and US-based Samuel Chu.

The Lis were granted bail two days later, but Andy Li was arrested again by Chinese authorities for his failed attempt fleeing to Taiwan with eleven others. While Li was serving the seven-month sentence handed down in China on 30 December 2020, Chan Tsz-wah, his assistant, was arrested on 15 February 2021 by Hong Kong police for collusion and assisting an offender, and had his bail denied later.

Following the release on 22 March 2021, Andy Li was sent back to Hong Kong and later charged with collusion, conspiracy to assist offenders, and possessing ammunition without a license. Both Li and Chan pleaded guilty to collusion with foreign forces on 19 August 2021, specifically through conspiring with Jimmy Lai, Mark Simon, and Finn Lau. They agreed with the description of Lai and Simon as the "masterminds" of the conspiracy that initially sought intervention in Hong Kong over police brutality during the 2019 protests and later expanded its scope to lobby for foreign sanctions on Hong Kong or China.

| Name | Age | Accused of | Status |
|---|---|---|---|
| Andy Li Yu-hin | 29 | Collusion | Pleaded guilty jailed for 7 years, 3 months |
| Chan Tsz-wah | 29 | Collusion | Pleaded guilty jailed for 6 years, 3 months |
| Jimmy Lai Chee-ying | 71 | Collusion | See Apple Daily |
| Wilson Li Chung-chak | 23 | Collusion | Not charged |

=== Agnes Chow (10 August 2020) ===
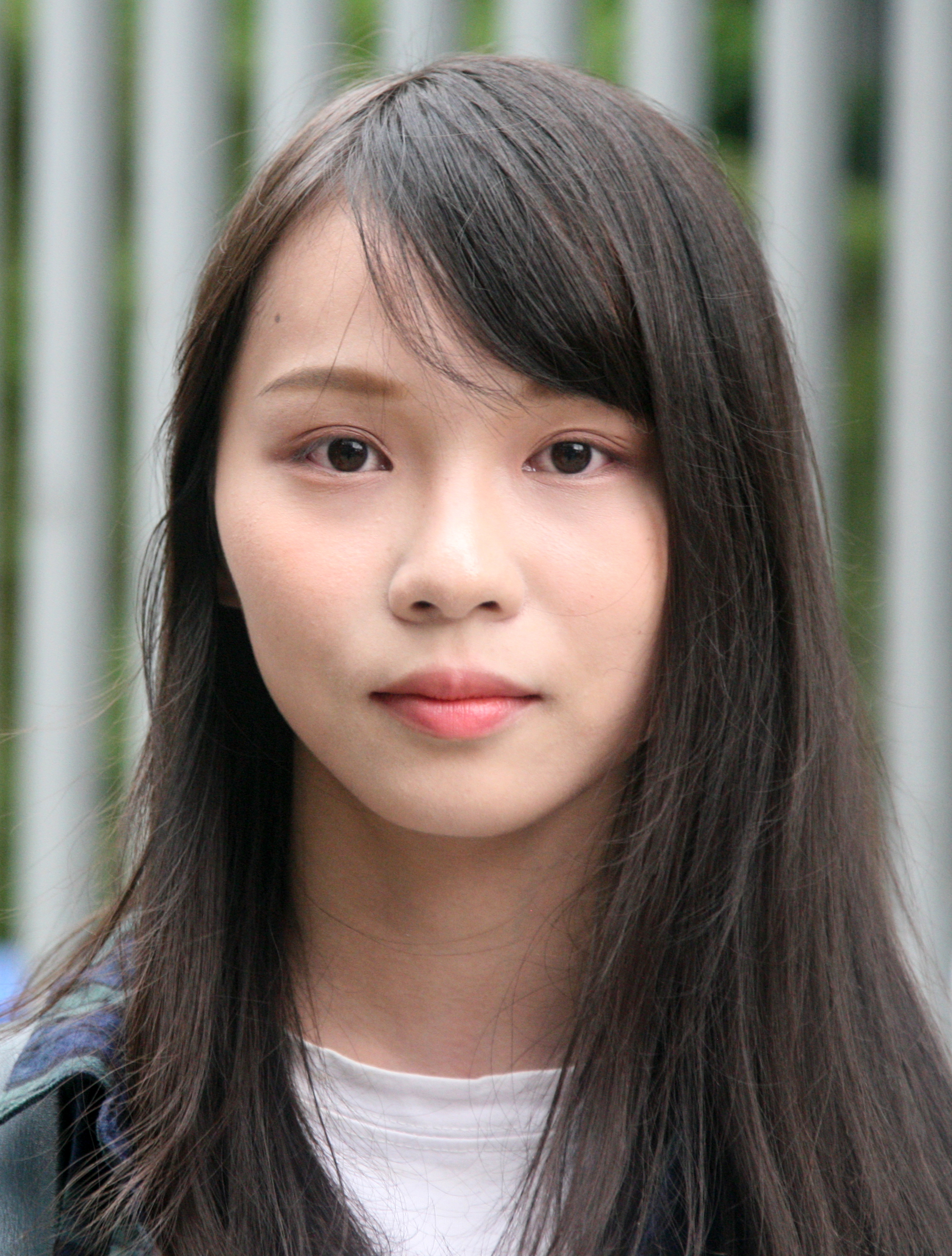
Agnes Chow in 2019

Agnes Chow Ting, a core member of the dissolved localism political party Demosisto, was also arrested on 10 August, accused of collusion. Chow was granted bail a day later, but was charged with unlawful assembly on 30 August 2019 for her participation in the siege by thousands of protesters of Wan Chai police headquarters on 21 June 2019. Pleading guilty, she was imprisoned for 10 months in December 2020. She was released after serving seven months on 12 June 2021, with no reason for her early release being immediately given.

Chow remained in regular contact with national security police as per her bail conditions, and was asked to join a propaganda trip to Shenzhen. She fled to Canada after her passport was returned for studying for a master's degree in Toronto.

| Name | Age | Accused of | Status |
|---|---|---|---|
| Agnes Chow Ting | 23 | Collusion | Not charged |

=== Adam Ma (15 August 2020) ===
Adam Ma Chun-man, nicknamed "Captain America 2.0" for his costumes, had been arrested multiple times for chanting pro-independence slogans. He was remanded in prison from November 2020 and charged with one count of secession; he was accused of chanting slogans, and calling for Hong Kong independence in speeches, on at least 20 public occasions between August and November 2020. He was not granted bail, and was found guilty on 25 October 2021 after a four-day trial. He was sentenced to jail for five years and nine months on 11 November 2021. On 3 August 2022, his sentence was reduced on appeal to five years, marking the first time that a conviction under the national security law had been successfully challenged. Local media reported on 25 March 2024 that Ma was expected to be released that day, under a rule that allowed reduction of a sentence by a third for good conduct; however, based on an assessment of the case by the Hong Kong Correctional Services officer based on the Safeguarding National Security Ordinance enacted on 23 March, Ma was not released. It was reported in June 2024 that Ma had appealed the decision. He was released in November 2025.

| Name | Age | Accused of | Status |
|---|---|---|---|
| Adam Ma Chun-man | 30 | Inciting secession | Found guilty jailed for 5 years |

=== Dragon Slaying Brigade (5 September 2020) ===
"Dragon Slaying Brigade" is a group planning to injure or kill police officers, in revenge to the crackdown on protesters.

Lai Chun-pong was arrested by the NSD on 5 September 2020 for "conspiracy with intent to injure police officers" in 2019, a non-national security offence. According to court documents, Lai and eight others, including three that failed fleeing to Taiwan, were accused of plotting a bomb attack to "slaughter" police during an anti-government protest on 8 December 2019. Eventually the case had a total of 13 defendants, some related to protests on 8 December 2019, and to a shooting incident on 20 December 2019. The Department of Justice later placed charges under the United Nations (Anti-Terrorism Measures) Ordinance, for the first time since its passage in the early 2000s.

Ng Wing-tak, a 34-year-old co-founder of online media outlet PPPN International, was arrested by the NSD on 1 October 2020 for conspiracy to injure police officer with intent in December 2019, suspected in connection with the "Dragon Slaying Brigade". Ng was released on bail. Apart from Lai and Ng, others were not arrested by the NSD.

| Name | Age | Accused of | Status |
|---|---|---|---|
| Ng Chi-hung | 24 | Non NSL offence | Pleaded guilty jailed for 23 years, 10 months for: Bombing of prescribed objects; Possession of arms with intent to endanger life |
| Wong Chun-keung | 22 | Non NSL offence | Pleaded guilty jailed for 13.5 years for: Bombing of prescribed objects; Sponsoring terrorism |
| So Wai-hin | 18 | Non NSL offence | Pleaded guilty jailed for 12 years for: Conspiracy to murder; Possession of arms with intent to endanger life; Resisting arrest with or committing offence while in possession of arms |
| Lai Chun-pong (Note: First arrested by National Security Police on non-NSL offences) | 29 | Non NSL offence | Found guilty jailed for 10 years, 10 months for: Making or possession of explosives; Acquitted by jury for: Bombing of prescribed objects; Conspiracy to murder |
| Pang Kwan-ho | 33 | Non NSL offence | Pleaded guilty jailed for 10 years for: Bombing of prescribed objects |
| Chan Yuk-lung | 27 | Non NSL offence | Pleaded guilty jailed for 9 years for: Conspiracy and possession of arms without licence; Possession of arms without licence |
| Chung Suet-ying | 29 | Non NSL offence | Pleaded guilty jailed for 7 years, 4 months for: Possession of arms with intent to endanger life |
| Choi Hoi-ming | 21 | Non NSL offence | Pleaded guilty jailed for 5 years, 10 months for: Abetting to cause explosion, or making or keeping explosive with intent to endanger life or property |
| Cheung Chun-fu | 22 | Non NSL offence | Acquitted by jury for: Bombing of prescribed objects; Conspiracy to murder; Making or possession of explosives |
| Cheung Ming-yu | 20 | Non NSL offence | Acquitted by jury for: Bombing of prescribed objects; Conspiracy to murder; Making or possession of explosives |
| Yim Man-him | 21 | Non NSL offence | Acquitted by jury for: Bombing of prescribed objects; Conspiracy to murder; Making or possession of explosives |
| Christian Lee Ka-tin | 24 | Non NSL offence | Acquitted by jury for: Bombing of prescribed objects; Conspiracy to murder; Making or possession of explosives; Possession of arms with intent to endanger life |
| Hui Cham-wing | 24 | Non NSL offence | Acquitted by jury for: Bombing of prescribed objects; Conspiracy to murder; Making or possession of explosives |
| Lau Pui-ying? | ? | Non NSL offence | Acquitted by jury for: Sponsoring terrorism |
| Ng Wing-tak | 34 | Non NSL offence | Not charged |

=== Tam Tak-chi (6 September 2020) ===
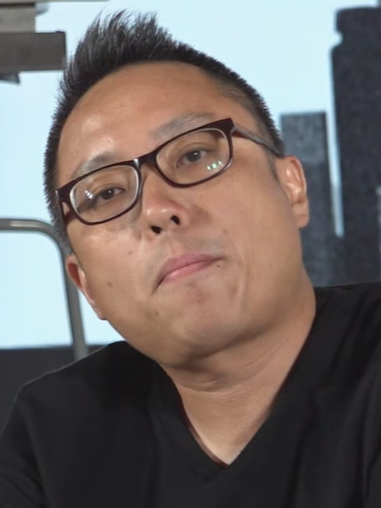
Tam Tak-chi in 2020

Tam Tak-chi, nicknamed "Fast Beat", was the vice-chairman of the pro-democracy political party People Power. He was arrested by the NSD at his residence in Tai Po on 6 September 2020, and charged with "uttering seditious words" and disorderly conduct in public. He was denied bail on 17 September. On 3 December, a NSL judge was assigned to the sedition case, meeting a request by prosecution that was based on their argument that the slogans Tam had chanted, including "Liberate Hong Kong, revolution of our times", were subversive. As of that date, Tam faced a total of 14 charges, including for uttering seditious words, inciting others to knowingly take part in an unauthorised assembly, and holding an unauthorised assembly. The chief district judge had announced the appointment of an NSL judge for the case the previous day, saying this was to avoid any potential legal challenges based on ultra vires if a ruling in favour of the prosecution was to eventuate.

It is reported that a female was arrested on the same day for shouting pro-independence slogans using a megaphone, accused of breaching the NSL. She was released on police bail.

Tam was found guilty of 11 out of 13 charges on 2 March 2022. He was sentenced to jail for 40 months on 20 April.

| Name | Age | Accused of | Status |
|---|---|---|---|
| Tam Tak-chi | 47 | Sedition | Found guilty jailed for 4 years, 2 months for: Seditious words; Inciting unauthorisied assembly; Disorder in public places; Refusing to obey police order |
| Unknown (female) | ? | NSL offence | Not charged |

=== Lui Sai-yu (24 September 2020) ===
Lui Sai-yu, a first year student at Hong Kong Polytechnic University who had joined the 2019 protests, was arrested on 24 September 2020 in Fanling along with his 49-year-old mother. Lui was charged with: possession of arms without licence, import of strategic commodities without licence, possession of offensive weapon; while his mother was bailed out by police. After dropping the alleged weapons offence, prosecutors charged Lui with inciting secession in April 2021 for spreading independence slogans, and with possession of offensive weapons with intent. Lui later agreed to plead guilty to the National Security offences but not to the offensive weapons charge.

On 27 April 2022, Lui pleaded guilty to the charge of selling weapons on Telegram and posting pro-independence messages. On 29 April, he was sentenced to five years in jail. Judge Amanda Woodcock had initially handed a sentence of three years and eight months, but persecution successfully appealed to the court to reconsider based on the minimum sentence of five years stipulated by the NSL for offences of a serious nature. Lui had not received bail. He appealed the verdict in July, but was rejected by the Court of Appeal on 30 November. In May, Lui was allowed to appeal for a sentence reduction at the Court of Final Appeal after having obtained a prerequisite certificate in April. The appeal was rejected in August, with a written judgement saying that Article 21 of the national security law, which set the minimum jail term for offences of a "serious" nature to five years, was mandatory.

Lui was released on 24 January 2024.

| Name / Surname | Age | Accused of | Status |
|---|---|---|---|
| Lui Sai-yu | 23 | Inciting secession | Pleaded guilty jailed for 5 years |
| Mrs. Lui | 49 | Inciting secession | Not charged |

=== 12 Hongkongers (10 October 2020) ===
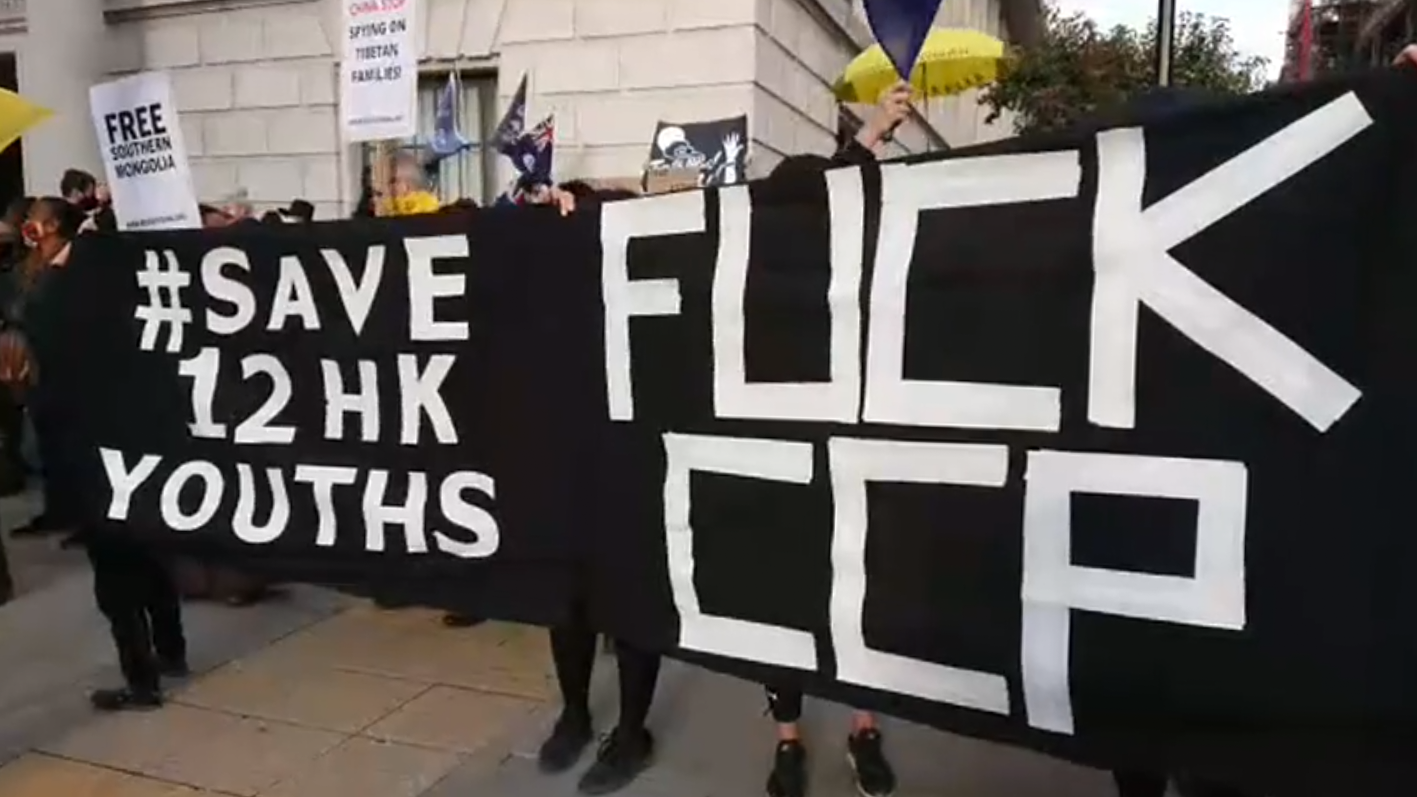
Protests in front of the Chinese embassy in London on China's national holiday on 1 October 2020

Nine people, four men and five women, were arrested by the Organised Crime and Triad Bureau of the Police Force on 10 October 2020 for allegedly assisting the attempted border-crossing of the 12 Hongkongers. Police also seized 500,000 Hong Kong dollars in cash, computers, mobile phones, and documents indicative of the purchase of a boat.

On 14 January 2021, 11 more were arrested by the NSD in connection with the case, including: Daniel Wong, Kowloon City District Councillor; Rono Fok, musician; Cheung Ching-yan, mother of Willis Ho, ex-Secretary General of Hong Kong Federation of Students.

| Name / Surname | Age | Accused of | Status |
|---|---|---|---|
| Cheung Tin-ying | 72 | Non NSL offence | Not charged |
| Daniel Wong Kwok-tung | 71 | Non NSL offence | Not charged |
| Cheung Ching-yan | 56 | Non NSL offence | Not charged |
| Kwan Wai-si | 49 | Non NSL offence | Not charged |
| Kong Sam-ming | 39 | Non NSL offence | Not charged |
| Rono Fok | 29 | Non NSL offence | Not charged |
| Kyrylo | 29 | Non NSL offence | Not charged |
| Chow Ying | 28 | Non NSL offence | Not charged |
| Tsang Cheuk-yin | 27 | Non NSL offence | Not charged |
| Yeung Tin-yi | 19 | Non NSL offence | Not charged |
| Ng Ying-chun | 18 | Non NSL offence | Not charged |

=== DJ Giggs (21 November 2020) ===
Edmund Wan Yiu-sing, better known as DJ 'Giggs', was a popular host at D100 Radio. In February 2020 he started the "Thousand Parents, Taiwan Aid" programme to help protesters exiled to Taiwan.

On 21 November 2020, Giggs, his wife Tsang Bik-wan, and his secretary Alice Lee Po-lai were arrested, accused of "providing financial assistance for secession" and money-laundering. The three were granted bail a day later, and were not charged. Three more, aged between 28 and 58, were arrested for the same accusation in connection with this case, which was only announced after media inquiries.

Giggs was arrested again on 7 February 2021 and charged the next day on suspicion of four counts of performing acts with seditious intention the next day, reportedly over his comments on air regarding his crowdfunding efforts. He was denied bail by judges and hence he remained in custody. He faced six new charges on 10 May 2021, of which five were additional ones for money laundering, and one was an additional one for conspiring to commit an act with a seditious intention. In a written statement, the judge described the contact of Giggs with two Taiwanese organisations, Judicial Reform Foundation and Presbyterian Church in Taiwan, as "very active". Alice Lee was charged with two counts of money-laundering but released on bail.

On 1 September 2022, Giggs pleaded guilty on three money-laundering charges and one count of sedition; as per a plea agreement with prosecution that had been revealed in May, six other charges were kept on file. Alice Lee had her charges kept on file as part of the plea agreement. On 7 October, Giggs was sentenced to 2 years and 8 months in prison. However, on 18 November, he was released after taking into account of remand time. After his release, he later moved to Canada with his wife in April 2023.

| Name | Age | Accused of | Status |
|---|---|---|---|
| Edmund "Giggs" Wan Yiu-sing | 52 | Inciting secession | Pleaded guilty jailed for 2 years, 8 months for: Act with seditious intention; Money laundering |
| Alice Lee Po-lai | 52 | Inciting secession | Charge dropped |
| Tsang Bik-wan | ? | Inciting secession | Not charged |
| Unknown (female) | ? | Inciting secession | Not charged |
| Unknown | ? | Inciting secession | Not charged |
| Unknown | ? | Inciting secession | Not charged |

=== CUHK congregation (7 December 2020) ===
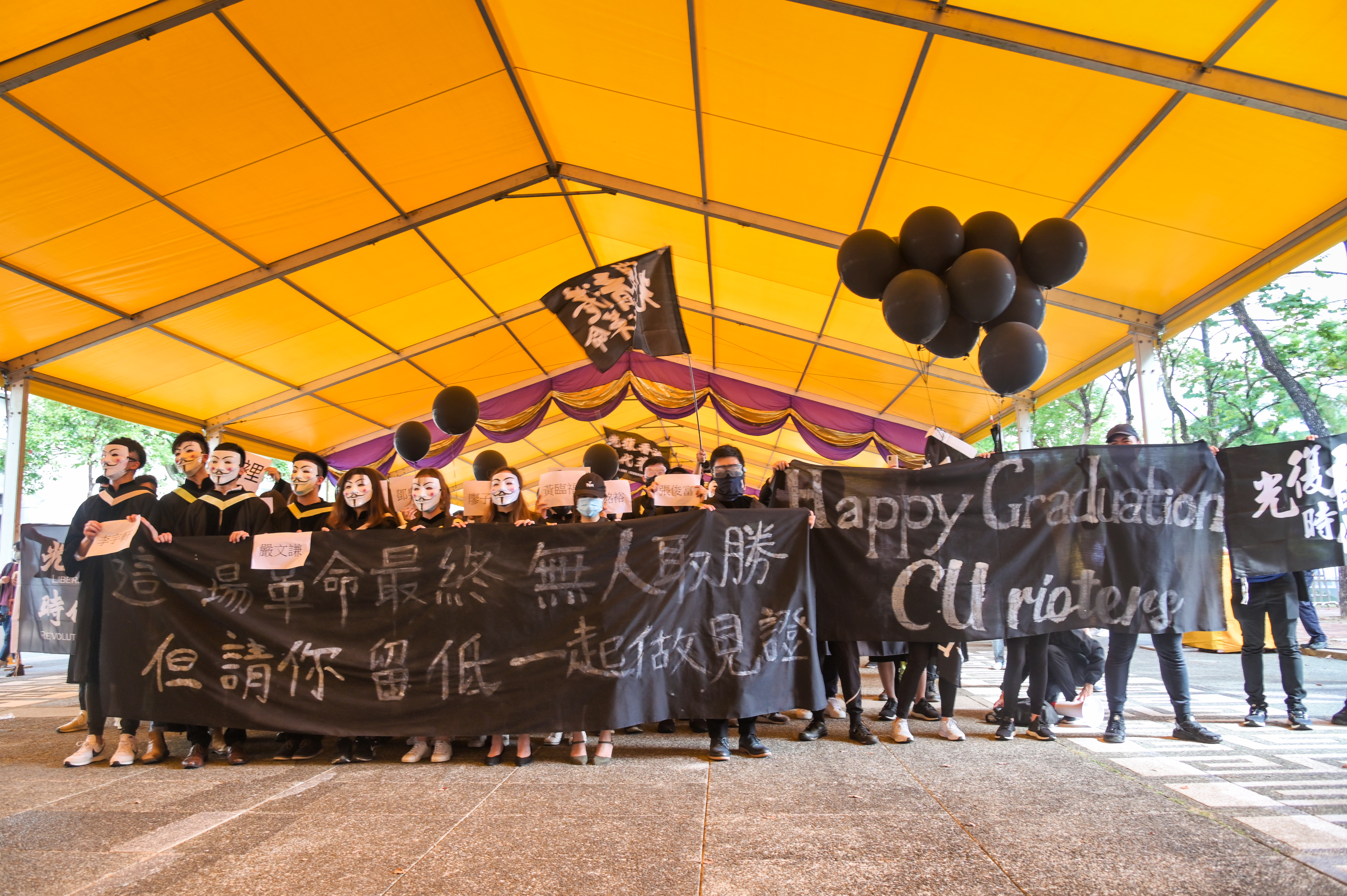
Protest at Chinese University of Hong Kong on 19 November 2020

The 88th congregation ceremony of Chinese University of Hong Kong was planned to be held on 19 November 2020, but was changed to online due to the COVID-19 pandemic. Students and protesters, nevertheless, rallied in the university on the day, chanting Glory to Hong Kong, showing or graffitiing Liberate Hong Kong or independence slogans on the campus.

On 7 December 2020, eight were arrested in a police operation for unlawful assembly, reportedly including three students, as well as district councillors und CUHK graduates Issac Lee and Eason Chan. Three of the group were accused of inciting secession. Police had based its operation on the examination of video footage on the day following the rally, reportedly with the agreement of university management. On 18 February 2021, another CUHK student, a male, was arrested for inciting secession.

On 2 March 2022, more than a year after the congregation, the National Security Department charged two with "conspiracy to publish seditious words", including one currently serving jail term. One was granted bail in April.

On 2 November 2022, the prosecutors dropped the sedition charge but added a new charge of unlawful assembly, which carries a heavier jail term. Shum and Tong both pleaded guilty to the new accusation, with Tong sentenced to up to three years at a correctional facility on 23 November, and Shum to rehabilitation centre on 20 April 2023

| Surname | Age | Accused of | Status |
|---|---|---|---|
| Tong Cheuk-him | 19 | Inciting secession | Pleaded guilty detention for: Unlawful assembly |
| Shum Ka-hon | 17 | Inciting secession | Pleaded guilty detention for: Unlawful assembly |
| Unknown | 16 | Inciting secession | Not charged |
| Unknown | 19 | Inciting secession | Not charged |
| Eason Chan Yik-shun | ? | Non NSL offence | Not charged |
| Issac Lee Ka-yui | ? | Non NSL offence | Not charged |
| Yeung Tsz-chun | ? | Non NSL offence | Not charged |
| Unknown | 23 | Non NSL offence | Not charged |
| Unknown | 34 | Non NSL offence | Not charged |
