= Mass media in Hong Kong =

Hong Kong's media consists of several different types of communications of mass media: television, radio, cinema, newspapers, magazines, websites and other online platforms.

== Overview ==
Hong Kong is home to many of Asia's biggest media entities and remains one of the world's largest film industries. The loose regulation over the establishment of a newspaper makes Hong Kong home to many international media such as the Asian Wall Street Journal and Far Eastern Economic Review, and publications with anti-Communist backgrounds such as The Epoch Times (which is funded by Falun Gong). It also once had numerous newspapers funded by Kuomintang of Taiwan but all of them were terminated due to poor financial performance. The Catholic Diocese of Hong Kong publishes Kung Kao Po, a weekly newspaper. Until the increased repression of freedom of expression in Hong Kong following the passing of the national security law in 2020, Apple Daily being the most read newspaper in the city; it was eventually forced to disband in 2021. Traditional PRC government-friendly journals, Ta Kung Pao and Wen Wei Po, are owned by the Central Government Liaison Office. In December 2015, the South China Morning Post – Hong Kong's newspaper of record – was acquired by the Alibaba Group, with the declared aim of promoting an alternative pro-China narrative to international media.

The freedom of press nominally is protected by the Hong Kong Bill of Rights, in contrast to the rest of the People's Republic of China, where control over media is pervasive under the General Administration of Press and Publication. However, this freedom has been in decline since the transfer of sovereignty over Hong Kong in 1997, and further still since the passing of the 2020 Hong Kong National Security Law. Before 2020, Hong Kong enjoyed "real press freedom" and ranked second in Asia after Japan in the Press Freedom Index, although it has been rapidly declining. Different views over topics sensitive in mainland China, such as the 1989 democracy movement culminating in the massacre of protestors in Tiananmen Square, Chinese Communist Party (CCP) rule, and democracy are still dynamically discussed among the media. Many books banned in China, such as the memoir of Zhao Ziyang, a former CCP party leader who stepped down in 1989, were able to be published in Hong Kong, until the crackdowns on free expression from 2020.

As of 31 December 2023, Hong Kong had:

- Daily newspapers: 90
  - Chinese-language dailies: 61
  - English-language dailies: 11
  - Bilingual dailies: 14
  - Japanese dailies: 3
- Periodicals (Including electronic newspapers): 376

As of June 2024, Hong Kong had:

- Television services licensees: 34
  - Domestic free television programme licensees: 3
  - Domestic pay television programme licensees: 1
  - Non-domestic television programme licensees: 9
- Government radio-television stations: 1
- Commercial radio stations / Sound broadcasting licensees: 2

== Law ==
=== Media authorities ===
Formerly, three statutory bodies regulated media in Hong Kong, with another statutory body acting as an independent broadcaster:

- Hong Kong Broadcasting Authority (BA) regulates broadcasters in Hong Kong by licensing and penalties according to the Broadcasting Regulation.
- Television and Entertainment Licensing Authority (TELA) is responsible for monitoring television and radio broadcasting to secure proper standards.
- Telecommunications Authority, (OFCA) the regulatory agency which applied held legislative power over antitrust, spectrum allocation and telecommunications legislation.
- Radio Television Hong Kong operates as an independent government broadcaster with 7 radio channels and 3 television channels, whilst also producing programmes for public dissemination.

In 2012, BA, OFCA and TELA were merged into one to form the new Communications Authority, which combined all the functions of its three predecessor organisations in one.

Non-Governmental bodies:

- Press Council was established in July 2000. The objective of the council is to promote the professional and ethical standards of the newspaper industry, defend press freedom, and deal with public complaints against local newspapers. It is an independent organisation.

=== Media regulation ===
Freedom of the press and publication are enshrined in Article 27 of the Basic Law, Hong Kong's mini-constitution, and are also protected by the International Covenant on Civil and Political Rights (ICCPR) under Article 39 of the Basic Law.

There is no law called "media law" in Hong Kong. Instead, the media are governed by statutory laws. In brief, there are 31 Ordinances that are directly related to mass media. Six of which are highlighted below.

- Registration of Local Newspapers Ordinance (Cap. 268), provides for the registration of local newspapers and news agencies and the licensing of newspaper distributors.
- Books Registration Ordinance (Cap. 142) (Cap. 106), provides for the registration and preservation of copies of books first printed, produced or published in Hong Kong.
- Telecommunications Ordinance (Cap. 106), makes better provision for the licensing and control of telecommunications, telecommunications services and telecommunications apparatus and equipment.
- Control of Obscene and Indecent Articles Ordinance (Cap. 390) controls and classifies articles which consist of or contain material that is obscene or indecent. Obscene Articles Tribunals are established to determine whether an article is obscene or indecent.
- Broadcasting Authority Ordinance (Cap. 391), provides for the establishment and functions of a Broadcasting Authority.
- Broadcasting Ordinance (Cap. 562), licenses companies to provide broadcasting services and regulate the provision of broadcasting services by licensees.

The rest of the Ordinances are of less importance since they do not aim at regulating mass media, but some of their provisions do affect the operation of media organisations and also the freedom of press.

The passing of Bill of Rights Ordinance (BORO) in 1986 strengthened the protection of fundamental human rights like press freedom or freedom of speech. This has been reflected in the loosening of control over mass media. Laws that violate the principle of press freedom are gradually amended. For example, section 27 of Public Order Ordinance, which criminalised the publishing of false news, was repealed in 1989.

Nonetheless, there are still concerns among the media sector that some existing laws may still undermine the freedom of the press and publication, e.g. Official Secrets Ordinance (Cap. 521) and Public Order Ordinance (Cap. 245).

== Media ==
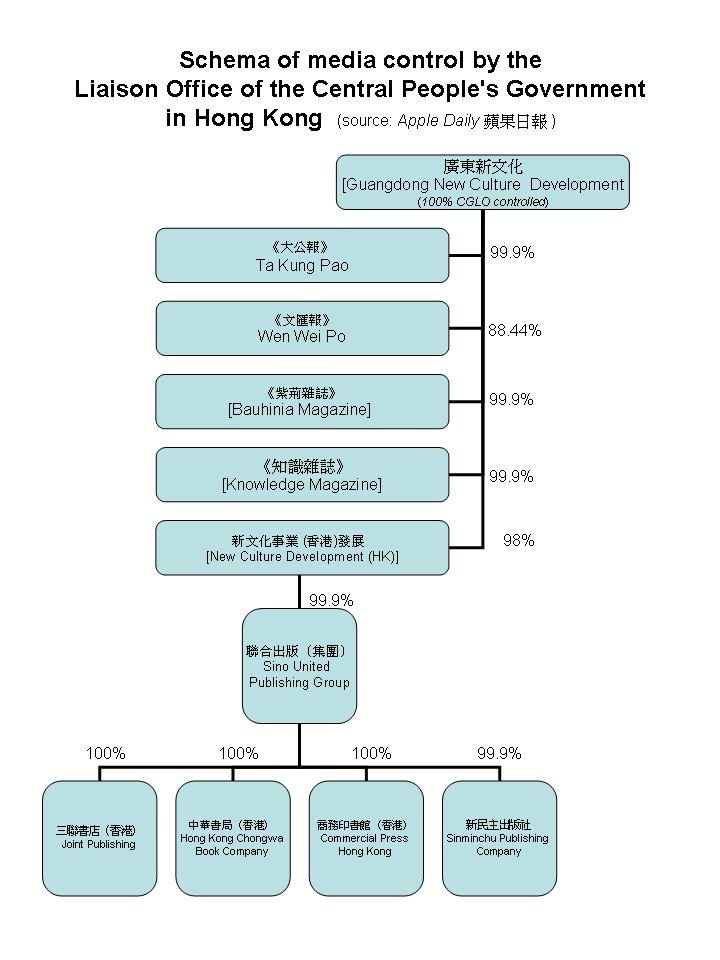
Schema of media control by the Liaison Office of the Central People's Government in Hong Kong

=== Television ===
Hong Kong has three broadcast television stations, ViuTV, HOY TV and TVB. The latter, launched in 1967, was the territory's first free-to-air commercial station, and is currently the predominant TV station in the territory. Paid cable and satellite television have also been widespread. Hong Kong soap dramas, comedy series and variety shows have reached mass audiences throughout the Chinese-speaking world. Many international and pan-Asian broadcasters are based in Hong Kong, including News Corporation's STAR TV. Hong Kong's terrestrial commercial TV networks, Christian Broadcasting Network of Hong Kong and TVB can also be seen in neighbouring Guangdong and Macau (via cable).

However, Asia Television, Hong Kong's first TV station, has seen a gradual decline in production quality and audience rating in recent years and faces financial difficulties. Its false report of death of Jiang Zemin severely damaged its credibility. On 1 April 2015, Hong Kong's Executive Council gave notice that ATV's terrestrial television licence would not be renewed and that it would instead end on 1 April 2016. RTHK and newcomer HKTVE (owned by Richard Li's PCCW which also owns the IPTV service Now TV) took over the frequencies of ATV since 2 April 2016. In May 2017, Fantastic Television (now named HOY TV) started its free-to-air broadcast.

=== Radio ===
- Radio Television Hong Kong (RTHK) – government-funded, operates eight networks in Cantonese, Mandarin and English
- Commercial Radio (CR) – operates CR1, CR2 networks in Cantonese and mediumwave (AM) English-language station AM 864
- Metro Radio Hong Kong (MRHK) – operates Metro Showbiz, Metro Finance and English-language Metro Plus

=== Book publishers ===
Sino United Publishing, formed in 1988 through merger of some of the historic publishing agencies, is Hong Kong's largest integrated publishing group. It has an estimated 80% share of the book publishing market. It is Hong Kong's largest Chinese-language publishing group, has 51 retail outlets in the territory, and is wholly owned by Central Government Liaison Office, which also owns newspaper titles Ta Kung Pao and Wen Wei Po.

=== Newspapers ===
According to independent surveys conducted by The Chinese University of Hong Kong, South China Morning Post and Ming Pao are the most trusted newspapers in Hong Kong.

The Chinese language newspapers Headline Daily, Oriental Daily News, Apple Daily and Sun Daily have the highest shares in the Hong Kong newspaper market, while the Hong Kong Economic Times is the best-selling financial newspaper. The Standard, a free tabloid with a mass market strategy, is the most widely circulated English newspaper by a significant margin. Its rival, South China Morning Post, Hong Kong's newspaper of record, has the most paid subscribers among English-language papers in Hong Kong. Since its purchase by Malaysian tycoon Robert Kuok's Kerry Media The South China Morning Post has gradually become pro-China, pro-establishment publication. It was announced on 11 December 2015 that Alibaba Group would acquire the South China Morning Post from Robert Kuok, who has owned it since 1993. Alibaba said that the acquisition was made out of the desire to improve China's image in light of the western bias of the journal. The latest to join the newspaper scene is HK01, which launched in March 2016. As a Hong Kong–based advocacy media, HK01 are dedicated to disrupting discussion with interactive multimedia storytelling through the Web, print and physical space. Readers can take advantage of its in-depth reporting and all-round analysis in current affairs, local stories and lifestyle features that will help them evolve into critical thinkers.

=== Magazines ===
- bc magazine
- BENCHMARK Magazine
- BOOM Magazine
- Capital
- Capital CEO
- Capital Entrepreneur
- CAZBuyer
- Cheng Ming Magazine 《爭鳴》 (1977–2017)
- CarPlus
- City Magazine
- Cosmopolitan Hong Kong
- CUP Magazine
- East Touch
- East Week
- Echelon
- Elle Hong Kong
- Elle Men Hong Kong
- Esquire Hong Kong
- ExperiXonl 中文商業雜誌月刊
- Face
- Fashion & Beauty
- Harper's Bazaar Hong Kong
- HIM
- HK Magazine
- Jessica
- Jet
- JMen
- L'Officiel Hong Kong
- Marie Claire
- Marketing Magazine
- Men's Uno
- Ming Pao Weekly
- MRRM
- New Monday
- Next Magazine
- PCM
- PIPELINE
- Prestige Hong Kong
- Sai Kung Magazine
- San Po Yan
- Spiral
- Sudden Weekly
- Tatler Hong Kong
- Time Out Hong Kong
- Travel + Leisure Southeast Asia, Hong Kong & Macau
- The Trend (1978–2017)
- Vogue Hong Kong
- Vogue Man Hong Kong
- The Young Reporter

=== Public space media ===
- RoadShow
- Newsline Express

=== Online media ===
- Stand News (立場新聞) (Chinese) (Service ceased)
- Hong Kong Citizen News (眾新聞) (Chinese) (Service ceased)
- HK01 (香港01) (Chinese)
- Truth Media Hong Kong (TMHK) (Chinese)
- Initium Media (端傳媒) (Chinese)
- The News Lens (關鍵評論網) (Bilingual news in English & Chinese)
- EJInsight – English service of the Hong Kong Economic Journal
- Inkstone News (English)
- EP21.org (網政21)(Chinese) (Service ceased)
- HK Magazine / Asia City Media Group
- HIRADIO HK (係播網絡電台)(Chinese/English) (Service suspend)
- Honeycombers Hong Kong (English, Chinese)
- Harbour Times (English)
- Hong Kong Free Press (English)
- Hong Kong In-media (香港獨立媒體網) (Chinese)
- Hong Kong Television Network, online, since HK Government controversially denied a terrestrial broadcast licence in 2013
- House News (主場新聞) (Service ceased on 26 July 2014)
- "IBHK"(香港網絡廣播電台) / Online radio station. (Cantonese)
- Localiiz (English)
- Drastic Social (English, Chinese)
- CORPHUB
- The Beat Asia (English)
- Lifestyle Asia (English)
- Local Press (本土新聞) (Chinese)
- HKgolden news (高登新聞) (Chinese)
- Open Radio Hong Kong (開台)(Chinese)
- Passion Times (熱血時報) (Chinese)
- People's Radio Hong Kong (香港人民廣播電台)(Chinese) (Service ceased)
- Post 852 (852 郵報) (Chinese)
- ExperiXon中文商業雜誌 (ExperiXon 中文商業雜誌) (Chinese)
- Sassy Hong Kong (English)
- Sassy Mama Hong Kong (English)
- TALKONLY.net (講台)(Chinese)
- The Real Hong Kong News (English)
- United Social Press (社媒) (mostly Chinese)
- VJ Media (Chinese)
- Parity Media HK (社衡媒體) (Chinese)
- Lifenews HK 生活提案事務所 (Chinese)
- SAUCE Media HK (Chinese)
- PlaYeah 玩嘢！ (Chinese)

== Media organisations ==
- FactWire – a non-profit news agency (disbanded)
- Next Media
- Sing Tao News Corporation Limited
- SCMP Group
- Sino United Publishing – Hong Kong's largest Chinese publishing group, which has 51 retail outlets in the territory.

== Media freedom ==
Although media freedom in Hong Kong is theoretically guaranteed by a bill of rights, the perceived freedom of the Hong Kong media according to the World Press Freedom Index ranks 148th out of 180 countries in 2022, having slid from 18th place in 2002. Concerns have been brought about by a number of factors and high-profile incidents affecting the media. Pundits and journalists alike have been alarmed at the erosion of journalists' ability to report the news in an objective manner. Journalists have complained about sensitive news stories critical of the government that they have been under undisguised pressure to change or soften. There has also been pressure on organisations including major financial institutions to pull advertising from newspapers that take a pro-democracy or anti-government stance, and the brazen attack on a respected newspaper editor; All told, the incidence of censorship, political pressure to self-censor and intimidation is increasing, according to PEN American Center and the International Federation of Journalists. The Hong Kong Journalists Association noted that there were at least 28 attacks on journalists covering the Umbrella Revolution. The aggressive moves made by publishing houses controlled by Sino United Publishing against independent publishers particularly since the 2014 protests, the unexplained disappearance in 2015 of four individuals linked to an independent publisher of sensitive books, as well as the acquisition of Hong Kong's newspaper of record by Alibaba Group all increased fears of political encroachment on press freedom by parties closely linked to the communist regime.

=== 2003 Article 23 controversy ===
In 2003, the government attempted to implement the Article 23 of the Basic Law which prohibits crimes against national security and sedition. The National Security (Legislative Provisions) Bill 2003 states that it is a legal offense for media to be seditious and disclose national secrets, but the vague definition led to concerns that it may become a political tool for accusing dissidents' voices, as has happened in Mainland China.

The bill caused a significant public outrage and a mass demonstration of 500,000 people, forcing the government to withdraw the bill and several cabinet members to step down.

=== Booksellers disappearances ===
The disappearances of five Hong Kong people related to an independent publisher and bookstore in October to December 2015 precipitated an international outcry. The unprecedented disappearance of a person in Hong Kong, and the bizarre events surrounding it, shocked the city and crystallised international concern over the possible abduction of Hong Kong citizens by Chinese public security bureau officials and their likely rendition, and the violation of several articles of the Basic Law and the one country, two systems principle. There is widespread suspicion that they are under detention in mainland China.

=== 2020 Apple Daily arrests ===
Following the promulgation of the National Security Law in Hong Kong, Apple Daily owner Jimmy Lai was arrested for alleged as part of an investigation into an online group that canvassed foreign countries to sanction Hong Kong. On the same day activist Agnes Chow was arrested over NSL offences. The paper announced its closure on 23 June 2021.

The arrests are perceived as acts of suppression on the freedom of press in Hong Kong by the Chinese and HKSAR government.

=== Selina Cheng case and Dow Jones conviction ===
In June 2024, The Wall Street Journal learned that its Hong Kong reporter Selina Cheng was a candidate for the leadership of the Hong Kong Journalists Association (HKJA). Cheng's editor demanded that she withdraw from the election and from participation in the union, although the right to stand for election and participate in a union without employer consent is established under Hong Kong employment law. Cheng did not withdraw and was elected to the leadership role. In July 2024, the paper's chief editor Gordon Fairclough travelled to Hong Kong and fired her. In response to press queries, the WSJ declined to comment on Cheng's case except to acknowledge there had been "restructuring". Cheng responded that the restructuring was a layoff of one person.

The paper's action against Cheng attracted criticism from media organisations, press unions and human rights proponents across the globe. Chinese state media celebrated her sacking, with the Global Times calling the press union "a malignant tumour that harms the city's safety and security". Hong Kong's security minister Chris Tang said the press union was "not a well-recognized association". Cheng said that the Wall Street Journal had fired her to avoid being seen as advocating press freedom in the city. In July 2024, the NewsGuild-CWA and Independent Association of Publishers' Employees, the union for Dow Jones, expressed their support for Cheng and launched a petition calling on WSJ to reinstate her, which gathered 335 employee signatures.

In November 2024, Cheng announced she would pursue legal action against Dow Jones after mediation attempts proved unsuccessful. Cheng had filed a complaint with Hong Kong's Labour Department, which investigated but declined to prosecute after seeking legal advice from the Department of Justice. In February 2025, Cheng launched a private prosecution against Dow Jones Publishing Co (Asia) Inc. at the Eastern Magistrates' Courts. The company faced two charges under Hong Kong's Employment Ordinance: one count of doing an act calculated to prevent or deter an employee from exercising union participation rights, and one count of terminating employment over union participation. Dow Jones pleaded not guilty to both charges, each carrying a maximum fine of HK$100,000.

Cheng was represented by Senior Counsel Nigel Kat and barrister Nicklaus Pannu-Yuon, with solicitor Adam Paul Clermont as instructing solicitor. Dow Jones was represented by Senior Counsel Benson Tsoi. The trial was heard before Principal Magistrate David Cheung over twelve days. During the trial, Cheng testified that her supervisor had told her that her participation in the HKJA election was "problematic" and that the matter needed to be discussed with Wall Street Journal management in New York and Dow Jones in-house lawyers. The court heard that a Dow Jones human resources director had informed Cheng by email that she "did not seek, and will not receive the company's approval" to pursue the HKJA chair role. The defence argued that the prosecution had not proven the individuals involved acted as the "directing mind and will" of the company, contending that any offence, if proven, would lie against the individuals rather than the corporate entity. Dow Jones also accused Cheng of abusing the criminal process and acting in bad faith, pointing to emails showing she had demanded HK$3 million as settlement or reinstatement with a formal apology. Cheng denied that financial compensation was her primary motivation, stating she wanted to hold employers accountable for violations of the law.

On 10 September 2026, Principal Magistrate David Cheung convicted Dow Jones of the first charge of deterring Cheng from exercising her union participation rights. The court acquitted the company on the second charge of terminating Cheng's employment over her union role, with the magistrate finding that the defence had raised sufficient reasonable doubt, as the possibility that the company dismissed Cheng as part of a genuine corporate restructuring could not be ruled out beyond a reasonable doubt. Speaking to reporters after the hearing, Cheng said her case had brought awareness of union suppression in Hong Kong and that employers had no right to require employees to consult them before joining a union. Sentencing is expected at a later date. The Wall Street Journal faces a maximum fine of HK$100,000. Dow Jones did not immediately respond to a request for comment following the verdict.

Hong Kong centrist lawmaker Tik Chi-yuen criticized the Wall Street Journal for self-censorship and fear of offending the authorities, which seriously impacts press freedom in Hong Kong. Ben Lam, a former Mong Kok East politician residing in the UK, described WSJ's actions as supporting authoritarianism and compared their chief editor to Walter Duranty. In a series of articles about News Corp, Australian online news outlet Crikey described Cheng's firing as part of "turmoil" at the WSJ and that "the global purging of newsrooms is as much about creating a politically correct workforce of reliable journalistic cadres as it is about simply saving costs." The U.S.-China Economic and Security Review Commission annual report noted the significance of the event as demonstrating "the pressures on foreign media to self-censor in line with the CCP's requirements", concluding that the WSJ's action "calls into question claims that foreign businesses have been unaffected by the new atmosphere following the passage of the NSL and Article 23 Ordinance".

== Controversies ==
=== Credibility ===
Ethical studies have been conducted by four journalism groups (Hong Kong Journalists Association, Hong Kong News Executives' Association, Hong Kong Federation of Journalists, Hong Kong Press Photographers' Association). They could not deny the fact that the mass media were suffering decreasing respect of Hong Kong citizens. Journalism was no longer seen as a respectable profession. The public had little trust in newspapers. The public attributed different motives to journalists. While readers who are pro-government sees journalists advocating their personal views to be producing fake news, readers who are anti-government sees journalists defending power to be producing fake news. The news industry attributed this phenomenon to the citizens' complaints about the decreasing ethics of journalists.

Stories were exaggerated often violating privacy. A study was conducted by Hong Kong Journalists Association in early 2007 to find that 58.4% of journalists in Hong Kong considered that the degree of freedom of speech had decreased since the handover in 1997. Furthermore, nearly 60% of the interviewed journalists also thought that more self-censorship had been practised then than 1997. Thirty percent of media workers participating in the survey admitted to having self-censored, and some forty percent knew of colleagues who had practised self-censorship. The chairman of the HKJA pointed out that after this self-censorship of media is related to political and economic pressures traceable linked to the Chinese Communist Party (CCP). She suggested that many media owners are representatives of the National People's Congress, have investments or eye investment opportunities in the mainland and are reluctant to jeopardise the political relationship.

=== Yellow journalism ===
On 19 October 1998, a woman killed her two young children by pushing them out of a window from a high-rise building and then jumped to kill herself. The husband Chan Kin Hong was widely reported to have little remorse on their death, saying he has "high libido" but his wife lost sexual drive after giving a birth to the latest baby and he had to visit prostitutes regularly. He also met another woman and planned to have his new life.

He caused a significant public outcry. Some days later, Apple Daily published a front-page photograph showing Chan with two prostitutes soon after his family's deaths. It was later revealed that the newspaper had paid Chan to pose for the photograph and the newspaper subsequently published a front-page apology.

This incident and other concerns over increasingly aggressive news coverage and paparazzi in the intensive media battles for readers and viewers began widespread public discussions regarding press practices and accompanying ethical concerns that continue to this day over issues of privacy, responsible reporting and journalistic standards.

=== Invasion of privacy ===
In August 2006, Gillian Chung of the local pop duo Twins filed a writ against Easy Finder Magazine for publishing photos of her changing backstage at a concert in Malaysia. This raised another media ethics and aggressive paparazzi concern. And again, the magazine sold well, printing two runs of the magazine, selling out twice.

The Hong Kong Television and Entertainment Licensing Authority received 2875 complaints regarding the revealing photos and the incident was referred to the Obscene Articles Tribunal for further action. On 1 November 2006, Easy Finder lost its appeal against an obscenity ruling on the published article and pictures. The appeal panel upheld the judgement, declaring the article "obscene", and saying it was a "calculated act of selling sexuality which is corrupting and revolting".

=== Violent assault on editor ===
Kevin Lau, who had been chief editor of Ming Pao until January 2014, was attacked in the morning of 26 February 2014 as he was about to take breakfast at a restaurant in Sai Wan Ho, Hong Kong. He was seriously injured in a targeted knife attack. Journalists and press of the world saw the attack as an attack on press freedom. Thousands of people, led by leading journalists, attended a rally to denounce violence and intimidation of the media.

=== Siege of Apple Daily and attacks aimed at media owner ===
During the Umbrella revolution in 2014, anti-occupation protesters besieged the headquarters of Next Media, publisher of Apple Daily. They accused the paper of biased reporting. Masked men among the protesters prevented the loading of copies of Apple Daily as well as The New York Times onto delivery vans. Apple Daily sought a court injunction and a High Court judge issued a temporary order to prevent any blocking of the entrance.

On 12 November, media tycoon Jimmy Lai was the target of an offal attack at the occupied Admiralty site by three men, who were detained by volunteer marshalls for the protest site. The offices of Next Media and the home of Jimmy Lai, who controls the group, were fire-bombed in mid January 2015.

=== 2015 Policy address controversy ===
In the opening and concluding parts of his 2015 policy address, CY Leung attacked University of Hong Kong Students' Union publication, Undergrad, for allegedly advocating independence and self-determination for Hong Kong. He also criticised another HKU publication, from 2013, entitled Hong Kong Nationalism. He was criticised by pan-democrats and commentators for using the high-profile public address in an unprecedented attempt to undermine free speech and theoretical academic discussion by effectively declaring discussion of the topic "taboo". The number two and number three government officials, Carrie Lam and John Tsang respectively, distanced themselves from Leung, suggesting that Leung's controversial criticism of the magazines was personal and written by Leung himself; Leung insisted it was a team effort.

=== Sino United returns controversy ===
In January 2015, following CY Leung's attack on a compilation book entitled Hong Kong Nationalism, Joint Publishing, Chongwa, and Commercial Press – all owned by Sino United Publishing – de-listed the title. Hong Kong media reported that Sino had published and was distributing at least five anti-Occupy titles, and its stores were displaying these prominently, whereas popular books on the Umbrella movement by pro-democracy authors had been banished from their shelves. In March 2015, Up Publications, a small independent publishing house, complained that it was suddenly and unexpectedly faced with a large number of returns from the three main subsidiaries of Sino. Twenty titles were affected by the returns, to the serious detriment to the finances of Up Publications; many of the titles returned were not politically themed. The publisher was allegedly told by a bookshop source that its stance in the 2014 occupation and its publishing of books supportive of the Umbrella Movement were responsible. Although no reason was given for the returns, political motives were suspected as two of the delisted books about the occupation were strong sellers at independent bookshops.

== See also ==
- Newspapers of China
- Censorship in Hong Kong
- Communications in Hong Kong
- Freedom of the press in Hong Kong
- Media of the People's Republic of China
- List of defunct media due to Hong Kong national security law
