= Channel C =

Hong Kong online news media

- Type: Online media
- Founder: Five ex-Apple Daily employees
- Founded: 12 July 2021; 4 years ago
- Political alignment: Pro-democracy; Localism
- Language: Cantonese (spoken); Traditional Chinese (written)
- Readership: Facebook: >1 million; Instagram: >1.7 million; YouTube: >41 million (August 2022)

Channel C

YouTube information
- Channel: Channel C HK
- Years active: 2021–present
- Subscribers: 705 thousand
- Views: 403 million
- Last updated: 20 December 2024

Channel C is a Hong Kong online news media that focuses on video production and was founded on 12 July 2021 by five former Apple News narrators of the Next Animation Studio, affiliated with Apple Daily. The "C" of Channel C stands for City, Crime and Culture, focusing on real-time popular topics, breaking news, and cultural life.

On 22 April 2025, the outlet ceased operations due to financial issues. On 10 July, the outlet announced that it had secured funding from a white knight and would resume operations under the new name Channel WE. Its first story was posted the same day, and it became fully operational starting 12 July.

== See also ==
- Applelisation
