= Apple Daily (Taiwan) =

Taiwan-based newspaper

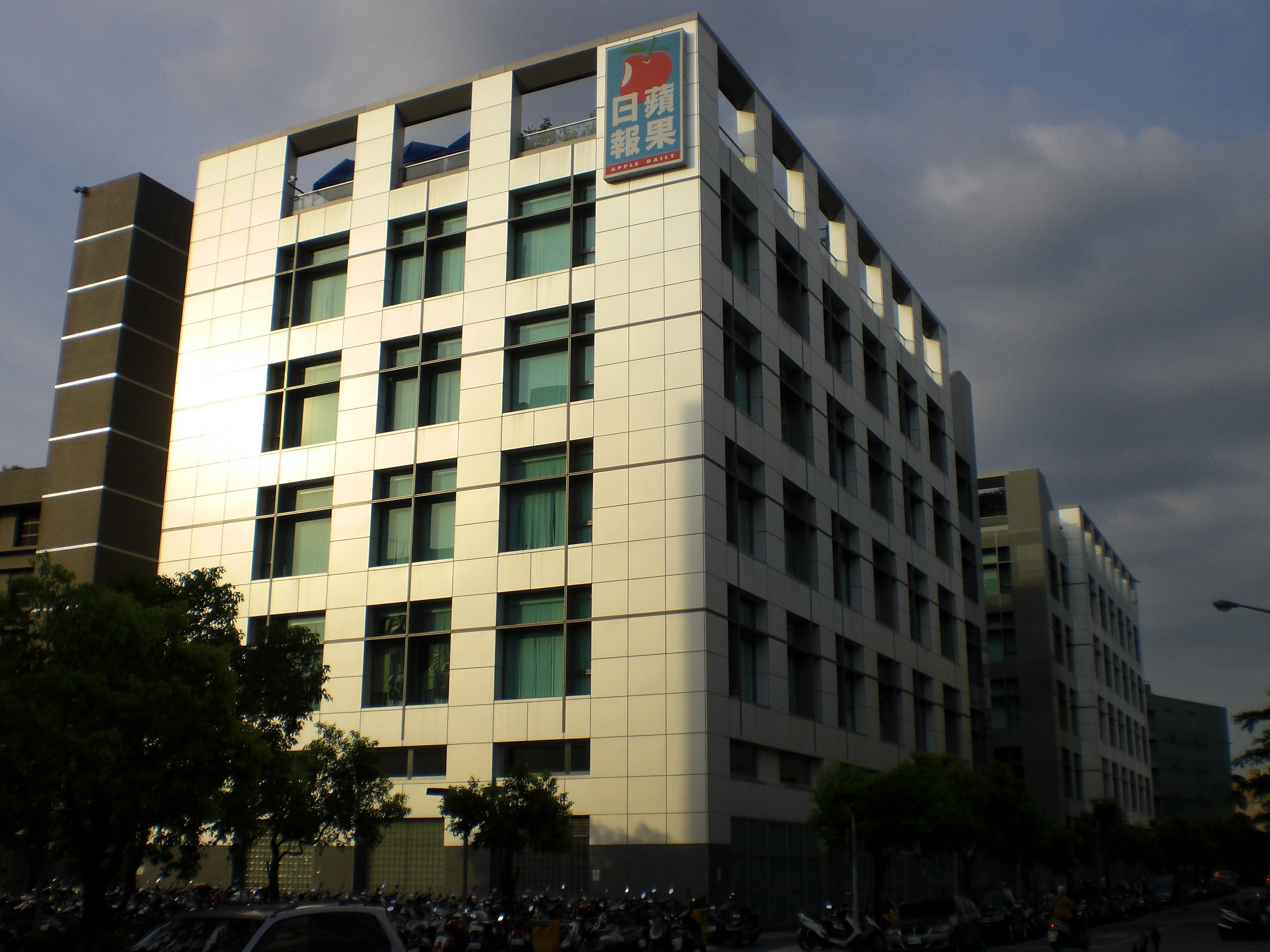
- Apple Daily (Taiwan) head office
- Type: Daily newspaper (2003–2021); Online newspaper (2021–2022)
- Format: Broadsheet
- Owner: Next Digital
- Founded: 2 May 2003 (23 years ago)
- Ceased publication: 17 May 2021
- Political alignment: Neutral (Taiwan); Pro-democracy camp (Hong Kong)
- Language: Traditional Chinese
- Headquarters: Neihu District, Taipei
- Country: Taiwan
- Website: tw.appledaily.com; appledaily.com.tw

Alternative logo

Apple Daily (Chinese: 蘋果日報; pinyin: Píngguǒ Rìbào; Pe̍h-ōe-jī: Pîn-kó Ji̍t-pò) was a Chinese-language tabloid published in Taiwan, known for its sensational headlines, paparazzi photographs, and animated news videos. The paper was owned by Next Digital (fka Next Media), which published an eponymous newspaper in Hong Kong. Next Digital filed for liquidation in September 2021, and a Hong Kong court ordered the winding-up of the company in December 2021. Apple Daily (Taiwan) published its last printed edition on 17 May 2021, and operated its website until 31 August 2022, before rebranding itself as Next Apple News. According to Apple Daily's Union, 326 out of 801 workers at the newspaper were asked to leave when the print edition closed, including news staff and others working for the print edition.

The paper's last interim financial report recorded a daily average print circulation of approximately 83,000 copies in Taiwan at the time of closure.

== History ==
After Jimmy Lai founded Next Media Taiwan in late 2000 and started a Taiwanese version of Next Magazine, preparations began for the launch of a Taiwanese version of Apple Daily in 2003, with senior journalists from China Times and United Daily News being taken on. Both these newspapers and the Liberty Times, the "big three" in Taiwanese journalism, initially blocked Apple Daily first published on 2 May 2003. It was the first newspaper in Taiwan to publish 365 days a year, and it was the only newspaper in Taiwan subject to the circulation audit from Audit Bureau of Circulations (ROC). Opening the Apple Daily in Taiwan was part of a larger push by parent company Next Media into the Taiwanese market. Next Media brought a combination of celebrity gossip and investigative journalism that was new to the market. Circulation peaked at 700,000. Its approach either inspired or revolted competitors and changed Taiwan's media landscape. In December 2025, Lai was found guilty of conspiracy to collude with foreign forces and conspiring to publish seditious articles under Hong Kong's National Security Law. On 9 February 2026, he was sentenced to 20 years in prison, the longest sentence handed down under that law. The paper was considered politically neutral by many Taiwanese people, prioritizing sensationalism (especially sexual, to some criticism) over serious political reporting. Thus, it was joked that the paper was "yellow" ("pornographic") instead of belonging to the Taiwanese blue (pro-China) and green (localist) political camps. Overall, the paper primary represented a "mild" form of Taiwanese identity supporting the status quo and opposing both reunification and "radical" independence. However, it attempted to represent differing perspectives and occasionally used terms found in publications espousing a "Chinese" identity.

=== 2012 sale and anti-monopoly campaigns ===
In 2012, the Next Media Group withdrew from the Taiwan market and sold its Taiwan operations, including Apple Daily, Sharp Daily, Next Weekly and the Next TV cable network. On 29 November, investors including Want Want China Times group president Tsai Shao-chung, Formosa Plastics Group chairman William Wong and Chinatrust Charity Foundation chairman Jeffrey Koo, Jr, signed a contract with the Next Media Group in Macau. Tsai Shao-chung is the son of Tsai Eng-meng, the chair of the Want Want Group, who owns China Times, one of the largest newspapers in Taiwan, and has acquired 60% of the second largest cable TV services on the island. Tsai Eng-meng had made a controversial comment in an interview with Washington Post, stating that reports about massacre in the Tiananmen Square protest of 1989 were not true. If the Next Media buyout deal were approved by the Taiwan Government, Want Want Group would control nearly 50% of Taiwan's news media. Fearing that Tsai's pro-Beijing position and the media monopoly would hurt media freedom and democracy, protesters campaigned to urge the Taiwan Government cancel the Next Media sale. In the end, the deal collapsed and only the Next TV channel was sold to another group, ERA Communications, in 2013.

=== 2019: Becoming an online service ===
On 4 April 2019, Apple Daily became an online newspaper, and began charging a NT$10 monthly subscription fee in September 2019, following a trial period between June and August 2019.

In 2020, Apple Daily won an Award for Excellence in the SOPA Scoop Award (Chinese category) for its investigation into fraudulent speculation on farmland, titled "Land Injustice: Overpriced Farms in Taiwan.

On 14 May 2021, the newspaper announced the discontinuation of their print edition, citing "long term profit losses" as the main reason. The final printed edition appeared on 17 May 2021, with printing ceasing on 18 May 2021. On 30 August 2022, Apple Online announced that the final updates to the website would be rolled out the next day. As Apple Online ceased operations, Singaporean entrepreneur Joseph Phua, founder of the livestreaming platform 17Live, declared the establishment of Next Apple News, and the hiring of a majority of the Apple Online staff.

== See also ==
- Media of Taiwan
