= List of defunct media due to the 2020 Hong Kong national security law =

Prosecuted media outlets

Apple Daily

Stand News

This list includes the defunct media outlets since the passage of the Hong Kong national security law (NSL) in 2020.

Amongst the listed media, Apple Daily, Stand News, and Citizen News are regarded as the three most prominent news outlet critical of the government, of which the former two were also prosecuted by the national security police for "conspiring to publish seditious publications", a colonial-era charge ruled by court as endangering national security.

Some other media had announced closure due to security and other concerns related to the NSL, which are detailed below.

== List ==
Publication	Founded	Defunct	Reason	Source
Frontline HK	1991	5 May 2020	Cited coronavirus restrictions while the NSL is not the main reason	
Mirror Media Group	1991	1 July 2020	Cited the NSL for withdrawal from Hong Kong	
Next Magazine	1990	23 June 2021	Accused of breaching the NSL; company fund frozen; office raided and editors arrested	
Apple Daily	1995	24 June 2021 (23 June 2021 announced)	Accused of breaching the NSL; company fund frozen; office raided and editors arrested	
Post 852	2013	27 June 2021 (15 May 2021 announced)	Cited social and political changes	
Rice Post	2015	1 July 2021	Cited lack of manpower	
DB Channel	2019	4 November 2021	Cited tense social situation and to protect the safety of employees	
Stand News	2014	29 December 2021	Accused of breaching the NSL; company fund frozen; office raided and editors arrested	
CLS	Unknown	28 December 2021	Said safety of media workers no longer guaranteed under the NSL	
IBHK	2013	30 December 2021 (29 December 2021 announced)	Closure without warning	
Hong Kong Indie Media News	2019	1 January 2022 (29 December 2021 announced)	Said to avoid mistakenly touching the law	
Citizen News	2017	4 January 2022 (2 January 2022 announced)	Cited concerns over press freedom	
~~In-voices-strong~~	2021	~~2 January 2022~~	As affiliated media of Citizen News, later revived as independent media	
Mad Dog Daily	2018	3 January 2022	Cited security concerns	
Polymer	2013	7 January 2022 (5 January 2022 announced)	Cited closure of multiple media outlets	
Dare Media HK	Unknown	6 January 2022	Repeated harassment against shareholders	
White Night	Unknown	8 January 2022	Closure without warning	
Local Press	2014	1 March 2022	Closure without warning	
FactWire	2015	10 June 2022	Briefly referred to the changing media landscape and said "time to end our journey"	
Transit Jam	2020	25 April 2023	Media registration withdrawn following government criticism of founder	
