= Easy Finder =

Chinese tabloid magazine

- Traditional Chinese: 壹本便利
- Simplified Chinese: 壹本便利
Transcriptions
Standard Mandarin
- Hanyu Pinyin: Yī Běn Biànlì
Yue: Cantonese
- Jyutping: jat1 bun2 bin6 lei6

Easy Finder (Chinese: 壹本便利; Jyutping: jat1 bun2 bin6 lei6) was a weekly Chinese tabloid magazine which was first published on 13 September 1991 in Hong Kong. Published by Next Media Limited which is owned by Jimmy Lai. It stopped publishing on 23 May 2007. Easy Finder was commonly known to participate in yellow journalism (ex. hidden cameras, aggressive pursuit, harassment, etc.) in collecting story ideas.

== History ==
Initially, Easy Finder was a free supplementary booklet of Next Magazine which mainly provides information on new products. There was a section of job vacancy ads (青雲路) and a section of classified ads. The name of the magazine gives hints that it is originally more an information guide than a normal magazine. It became a separate magazine in 1991. The target readership of Easy Finder are youth and students.

Apart from Easy Finder, two additional publications (Eat and Travel Weekly (飲食男女) and Trading Express/Auto Express) (交易通/搵車快線) are included free of charge. Those three booklets cover the latest trends, for instance, fashion, hot gossip, horoscopes, food, fitness, etc. The average net circulation per issue reached 118,720 (1 April – 30 June 2003) according to Hong Kong Audit Bureau of Circulations.

Easy Finder published its last issue (No 800) on 22 May 2007. Eat and Travel Weekly and Trading Express/Auto Express continue to published and are included from issue No 801 with FACE Weekly, a new magazine under the same stable of Next Media. The official website of Easy Finder is now re-diverted to FACE Weekly's new website.

== Magazine sections ==
There are twelve sections in Easy Finder:

1. Hot gossips (激 Zone)
2. Easy Girl (pin-up girls, models)
3. Comics news (漫動作; maan6 dung6 zok3)
4. Careers and success stories (青雲路; cing1 wan4 lou6)
5. Cars and motors (頭文字Evolution, tau4 man4 zi6 Evolution)
6. Showbiz (娛樂天; jyu4 lok6 tin1)
7. Fashion and trends (潮流屋村; ciu4 lau4 uk1 cyun1)
8. Digi Finder (Digital products)
9. Personality test (心理測驗; sam1 lei5 cak1 jim6)
10. Horoscope (占 Me Life)
11. Soccer betting (便利波經; bin6 lei6 bo1 ging1)
12. Reader's forum (便利諸嗡廣場; bin6 lei6 zyu1 jung1 gwong2 coeng4)

== Positioning ==
To attract teenage readers, this magazine uses a lot of Cantonese colloquial words which are very popular in leisure magazines in Hong Kong. Recent examples are "潮; ciu4" (fashionable) and "界; gaai3" (to court someone). The use of colloquial Cantonese words, however, does not comply to traditional or 'correct' written Chinese grammar.

Easy Finder maintains a heavy coverage of entertainment news. Since teenagers in Hong Kong are interested in local entertainment and show business, Easy Finder puts a lot of emphasis on entertainment news. Even when some of the reports are just rumours without solidity, they still appear on the cover if they are attractive and sensational enough.

Easy Finder is a market-oriented publication which tries to supply for what it perceives to be what young people desire. Images of sexy or even half-naked models appear on the cover. It covers a lot of sensitive topics such as sex, drugs, and even suicide. Reports on crimes such as murder and prostitution are often seen in this magazine. Such negative but shocking topics are the selling points of this magazine and these have attracted young readers.

However, it has also raised strong argument among the society. Many people claim that such awful and sexual pictures and topics will bring serious and harmful effects to the teenagers. This makes Easy Finder the most controversial magazine in Hong Kong. A lot of people do not accept the magazine, but the circulation stands.

== Electronic Version ==
Easy Finder publishes an electronic version via PDA version or via internet. In the electronic version, subscribers have access to not only the latest issue but also previous issues up to Issue 479 (2 April 2001) in archives. PDA format is also available.

== Controversies ==
=== Valentine's Day Romance Guide ===
For instance, as a protest to its sex-related articles in the booklet of Valentine's Day Romance Guide (情人節浪漫手冊) included in volume 366, Rev. Lo Sek Wai (羅錫為牧師), the chief board member of Goodnews Communication International Ltd (福音傳播中心), urged for a boycott of Easy Finder and made a complaint to the Television and Entertainment Licensing Authority.

=== Gillian Chung dressing room incident ===
On 22 August 2006, Hong Kong tabloid magazine Easy Finder published a series of photos of Gillian Chung inside a changing room after a Twins concert at the Arena of Stars in Genting Highlands, Malaysia. The pictures were taken while she was in the changing room with her personal assistant. One of the cover photos shows Chung's bare back as she is fixing her bra backstage. Her breasts are not revealed. A second, smaller cover photo shows Chung undressed and naked from the shoulder up. Hong Kong celebrities such as Jackie Chan staged a public protest denouncing the magazine's irresponsible actions.

The Hong Kong Television and Entertainment Licensing Authority received 2,875 complaints regarding the revealing photos and the incident was referred to the Obscene Articles Tribunal for further action. On 1 November 2006, Easy Finder lost its appeal against an obscenity ruling on the published article and pictures. In the appeal, a panel consisting of one Magistrate and four lay members, upheld the judgement, branding the article obscene, and saying it was a "calculated act of selling sexuality which is corrupting and revolting". During an interview of Jimmy Lai (founder of Next Media, Easy Finder's publisher) on the television show Be My Guest, he apologized to Gillian and claimed that he will return all the negatives of the photos.
