= Ip Yut Kin =

- Traditional Chinese: 葉一堅
- Simplified Chinese: 叶一坚
Transcriptions
Standard Mandarin
- Hanyu Pinyin: Yè Yījiān
Yue: Cantonese
- Jyutping: jip6 jat1 gin1

Ip Yut Kin (Chinese: 葉一堅; born 1951) is chief executive officer of Apple Daily Limited and Apple Daily Publication Development Limited, the publishers of the Hong Kong and Taiwan versions of the Apple Daily. Ip is also a director of Next Media Limited.

Ip was from 1996 to 2002 editor-in-chief of the Hong Kong version of Apple Daily. In addition, for several years, he wrote a column known as "Brother Kin with You" (堅哥與你) in Apple Daily.

Ip is a graduate of the National Chengchi University in Taiwan.
