= Next Animation Studio =

Taiwanese animation studio

Next Animation Studio (formerly Next Media Animation)
- Native name: formerly 蘋果動新聞
- Romanized name: formerly Píngguǒ Dòng Xīnwén
- Type: Subsidiary
- Industry: Animation
- Genre: Comedy; News
- Parent: Next Digital (formerly called Next Media)

Next Animation Studio (formerly Next Media Animation; Chinese: 蘋果動新聞; pinyin: Píngguǒ Dòng Xīnwén) is a Taiwanese subsidiary of Hong Kong–based Next Media, that creates humorous and simple CGI-animated coverage of recent news stories and sporting events and releases them through TomoNews. The shorts were originally narrated in Mandarin and subsequently subtitled in English; more recent ones are released with Chinese, English, and Japanese narration.

The studio became well-known beyond its Chinese-language audience in 2010, when it covered the revelations of Tiger Woods' extramarital affairs and the JetBlue flight attendant incident, and participated in an online video "feud" with Conan O'Brien. It collaborated with The Daily Show with Jon Stewart in creating a satirical depiction of the Wedding of Prince William and Catherine Middleton.

== Related research ==
To examine the effects of using animation in news report by what was then called Next Media Animation on young viewers, the School of Communication of Hong Kong Baptist University conducted two studies in 2011. For the first study, an experiment with 153 college students as participants was conducted to compare the perceived credibility of news reports with and without melodramatic animation. The results show that the animation format neither enhances nor dampens news credibility. However, they also show that sound effects reduce the credibility of news reports using melodramatic animation. The perceived credibility was also related to the credibility of the news organization and the medium dependency of the viewer. The other study adopts uses and gratifications theory and surveys 312 college students to investigate their viewing of animated-news. Seven motives were identified, which included social interaction, relaxation, information-seeking, entertainment, pastime, interpersonal learning and companionship, for viewing such animated-news videos. Results from a hierarchical regression suggest predictive relationships among personality characteristics, the seven motives and the effects of perceived news credibility and newsworthiness, and the intention to share such animated news videos with others.

== Resignation video incident ==
In September 2013, Marina Shifrin left her video-editing job at the company by posting a video on YouTube. In the film, she dances around the open-plan workspace to Kanye West's single "Gone", with subtitles explaining her grievances in detail. She writes: 'I work for an awesome company that produces news videos. For almost two years I've sacrificed my time, energy and relationships for this job, and my boss only cares about quantity and how many views each video gets. So I thought I'd make one of my own to focus on the content instead of worry about the views. Oh, and to let my boss know I quit.' Soon after her video went viral, Next Media Animation responded with their own video. Mark Simmons, a spokesperson for Next Media Animation, also sent a letter to Gawker (one of the sites that hosted the initial video) which they republished in full. In it, Simmons claims that Shifrin contacted him about quitting prior to the video at which time he told her to tell her supervisor, Simmons claims that this was ignored and that the video was the first her boss heard about the incident. Simmons also tried to downplay media speculations about possible poor working conditions noting that Shifrin worked 40 hours a week, 5 days a week and indicated that this was in line with most of the employees.
