= Sudden Weekly =

Hong Kong women's magazine

- Publisher: Next Media
- Paid circulation: 77,588/week Jul–Dec 2014 avg
- First issue: 6 August 1995; 31 years ago
- Final issue: 7 August 2015; 11 years ago
- Based in: Hong Kong
- Website: sudden.atnext.com

Sudden Weekly
- Traditional Chinese: 忽然一週
- Simplified Chinese: 忽然一周
Transcriptions
Standard Mandarin
- Hanyu Pinyin: Hūrán Yī Zhōu
Yue: Cantonese
- Jyutping: fat1 jin4 jat1 zau1

Sudden Weekly (Chinese: 忽然一週; Jyutping: fat1 jin4 jat1 zau1) was a women's magazine published in Hong Kong by Jimmy Lai's Next Media Limited from 1995 until 2015. The magazine featured articles on celebrities and targeted women. It ceased publication on 7 August 2015.

== Scoops ==
Issue 493 of the magazine (dated 7 January 2005 but delivered to newsstands on the night of 6 January) carried a story that included photographs of Director of the Chief Executive's Office Lam Woon-kwong with a woman outside a hotel in Tokyo and an interview with his wife of nearly 30 years. Lam resigned on the same evening, citing "in view of the media report on my private affairs, I tendered my resignation to the chief executive today".
