= Stephen Ting =

Hong Kong businessman

Stephen Ting, or Ting Ka-Yu, born 1959, is a former chief executive officer of Next Media, Hong Kong's largest listed media company. He was appointed to the post in January 2007.

After joining Apple Daily as chief financial officer in December 1997, Ting went on to become directory of the company and chief financial officer of the Group in 1999. He earned a Bachelor of Economics from Macquarie University in Australia and is a member of the Institute of Chartered Accountants in Australia.

Ting was the chief operating and financial officer, and an executive director, when he resigned from Next Digital at the end of 2015.

The Hong Kong national security law was enacted by China in 2020. This led to police raids at Next Digital and the arrest of Next Digital employees, including founder Jimmy Lai. Ting was arrested by the national security department of the Hong Kong Police Force on 2 March 2021 on fraud charges, and later released on bail and required to report back to police in May.
