= Next Digital =

Hong Kong media company

Next Digital Limited 壹傳媒有限公司
- Type: Public
- Traded as: SEHK: 282
- Industry: Media
- Founded: 15 March 1990; 36 years ago as Next Magazine; 20 October 1999; 26 years ago as Next Media, as parent company to Next Magazine, Apple Daily and other brands
- Defunct: 15 December 2021
- Fate: Liquidated
- Headquarters: Hong Kong
- Key people: Jimmy Lai, Founder; Ip Yut Kin, Chairman, Cheung Kim Hung, chief executive officer Ting Ka Yu, Stephen, COO and CFO
- Revenue: HK$146 million (as of 30 Sep 2020)
- Number of employees: 2,095 (as of 30 Sep 2020)
- Website: nextdigital.com.tw

Next Digital
- Traditional Chinese: 壹傳媒有限公司
Transcriptions
Standard Mandarin
- Hanyu Pinyin: Yī Chuán Méi Yǒuxiàn Gōngsī
Yue: Cantonese
- Jyutping: jat1 cyun4 mui4 jau5 haan6 gung1 si1

Next Digital Limited (Chinese: 壹傳媒有限公司), previously known as Next Media Limited, was a listed media company in Hong Kong. It was the nation's largest before it ceased operations in 2021. Founded by Jimmy Lai, it had 2,095 employees as of 30 September 2020. It had a user base of 5 million monthly unique visitors in Hong Kong, 12.3 million in Taiwan, 1.7 million in the United States and 399,000 in Canada up till 2019. Its newspaper Apple Daily was the most read in the city. The company and its newspaper became defunct in 2021 following the 2020 Hong Kong national security law, the imprisonment of Lai by the Chinese government, and the freezing of the company's assets.

== History ==
On 20 October 2015, the company changed its English name from Next Media Limited to Next Digital Limited. Under a climate of political repression, the news outlet's activism came into conflict with the Beijing regime. Some companies with ties to China had refrained from putting advertisements on any publication of the media group due to the heightened political pressure exerted on the business bodies in the city.

=== Raid by the police ===
In the early morning of 10 August 2020, Jimmy Lai, the founder of Next Digital, was arrested by the Hong Kong Police for alleged collusion with foreign powers after a Beijing-led investigation. A post on Twitter from the media group's executive, Mark Simon, confirmed the arrest. The Committee to Protect Journalists (CPJ) reported that "the arrest of media tycoon Jimmy Lai bears out the worst fears that Hong Kong's National Security Law would be used to suppress critical pro-democracy opinion and restrict press freedom". Steven Butler, CPJ's Asia program coordinator, commented, "Jimmy Lai should be released at once and any charges dropped."

The Hong Kong Police arrested seven people aged 39 to 72 accused of violating the new security law. The arrestees included Jimmy Lai (Founder of Next Digital Limited), Cheung Kim Hung (CEO of Next Digital Limited), Chow Tat Kuen, Royston (executive director and CFO of Next Digital Limited).

== Political position ==
Next Digital has often offered explicit, proactive support for pro-democracy groups in Hong Kong. It is regarded to hold libertarian views on financial and economic issues.

== Awards and recognition ==
News articles authored by journalists from Next Media have received recognition through news awards such as Human Rights Press Awards, Investigative Feature Writing, Excellence in Reporting on Women's Issues, Hong Kong News Awards, Hong Kong Institute of Professional Photographers Awards, Excellence in Video Reporting, Spot News Photography Prizes, Chinese-Language Cartoon / Illustration Merit, Chinese-Language News Merits, etc.

On the day of shutdown, queues of citizens formed to purchase the total 1 million copies of Apple Daily's last print, marking an end to the paper's decades of journalism and a symbol of Hong Kong's media pluralism.

=== The Hong Konger: Jimmy Lai's Extraordinary Struggle for Freedom film ===
Next Digital was featured in the film, The Hong Konger: Jimmy Lai's Extraordinary Struggle for Freedom, a documentary film produced by American think tank Acton Institute which received positive reviews from critics.

== Hong Kong publications ==
- Apple Daily – Formerly one of Hong Kong's largest circulation newspapers, which was published daily between 1995 and 2021.
- Next Magazine – Published on Wednesday evenings, one of Hong Kong's largest circulation news and entertainment magazines between 1990 and 2021.
- Easy Finder – A teen-focused entertainment magazine.

Monday Book – A set of four magazines sold together for HK$12 on Monday mornings that are more thematically male and commercially focused.

- Face – Gossip, entertainment and fashion
- Ketchup – Gadgets, gaming and mobile
- JobFinder – Jobs and recruitment magazine (sales assistant-level jobs)
- AutoExpress – Used cars, auto insurance, dating advertisements, car license plates for sale.
- Trading Express – Classified ads for products, small companies, second-hand watches.

Friday Book – A set of three magazines sold together for HK$12 on Friday mornings that are more thematically female and leisure-focused. At the end of 2008, Next Media relinquished its holding in these three magazines, whose editorial management since early 2009 has been tied to TVB Weekly (the official magazine of Television Broadcasts Limited and owned by a joint venture between Malaysian media conglomerate company Astro All Asia Networks plc (Astro) and Albert Yeung's Emperor Group).

- Eat and Travel Weekly – Sold to Astro in November 2006.
- Sudden Weekly – Women-oriented entertainment magazine. Sold to Astro in November 2006.
- Me – A cosmetics and fashion magazine. Founded by Astro in December 2006.

== Hong Kong websites ==
Vertical/community portals

In addition to original exclusive content and social networking tools, these sites aggregate content from all other sites.

- Lady – Female-focused portal with strong community
- Travel – Travel site
- Education – education guide for students of all levels
- Motor – Car vertical covering auto reviews and more
- Life – lifestyle guide on everyday city living
- Racing – a subscription-based horse racing guide focused on HK and Macau races (HK$1,888 per year)
- Soccer – soccer fans' guide to everything soccer
- Health – a vertical channel on medical and health

== Taiwan publications ==
- Apple Daily – Published daily, one of Taiwan's highest-circulation newspapers
- Sharp Daily – A free daily newspaper
- Next Magazine – Published on weekly, one of Taiwan's largest circulation news and entertainment magazines
- Me (Taiwan version) – A weekly magazine

== Corporate structure ==
There are four committees established by the company's board, granted for different kinds of duties.

- Executive Directors: for the purpose of approving issues and allotment of shares
- Audit Committee: mainly to assist the Board in its oversight of the integrity of the company's financial statements; the company's compliance with legal and regulatory requirements; the external auditor's qualifications and independence; and the performance of the company's internal audit function and external auditors.
- Remuneration Committee; to review and develop policies in relation to the remuneration of directors and senior management of the company; to make recommendations to the Board from time to time as may be necessary in relation to such policies.
- Ad hoc Sub-committee; made up of the financial heads of all major operation subsidiaries.

=== Senior leadership ===
Note: Senior leadership only reflects the structure since the Group's listing in 1999; previously, it was a private company with no formal structure

==== List of chairmen ====
1. Jimmy Lai Chee-ying (1999–2014); executive chairman
2. Cassian Cheung Ka-sing (interim Chairman 2014–2016); executive chairman
3. Ip Yut-kin (2016–2018); non-executive chairman
4. Jimmy Lai Chee-ying (2018–2020); second term; non-executive between 2018 and 2020; executive for part of 2020
5. Ip Yut-kin (2020–2021)

==== List of chief executives ====
Note: The position of Chief Executive was not used during the years 2002–2006, as the then-Executive Chairman Jimmy Lai took on CEO responsibilities from his post.

1. Lim Tai-thong (2000)
2. Pieter Lodewijk Schats (2001)
3. Stephen Ting Ka-yu (2007)
4. Jimmy Lai Chee-ying (2008)
5. Chu Wah-hui (2008–2010)
6. Chu Wah-hui and Cassian Cheung Ka-sing (2010–2011)
7. Cassian Cheung Ka-sing (2011–2014; interim CEO 2014–2016)
8. Cheung Kim-hung (2018–2021)

== Subsidiaries ==
- Apple Daily Limited
- Apple Daily Online Limited
- Apple Daily Printing Limited
- Cameron Printing Company Limited
- Database Gateway Limited
- Easy Finder Limited
- Easy Finder Hong Kong Marketing Limited
- Easy Media Limited
- Eat and Travel Weekly Company Limited
- Next TV Broadcasting Limited（2010-2013, was acquired by ERA Communications）
- Next Media Animation Limited
- Next Magazine Advertising Limited
- Next Magazine Publishing Limited
- Next Media Group Management Limited
- Next Media Hong Kong/Publication Publishing Limited
- Paramount Printing Company Limited
- Rainbow Graphic & Printing Company Limited
- Sudden Weekly Limited
