= Next Magazine (Hong Kong and Taiwan) =

- Native name: 壹週刊
- Editor: Jimmy Lai
- Frequency: Weekly
- Publisher: Next Digital
- Founded: 1990
- Final issue: 2021
- Based in: Hong Kong
- Language: Traditional Chinese
- Website: next.atnext.com

Next Magazine
- Traditional Chinese: 壹週刊
- Simplified Chinese: 壹周刊
Transcriptions
Standard Mandarin
- Hanyu Pinyin: Yī Zhōukān
Yue: Cantonese
- Yale Romanization: Yāt jāu hón
- Jyutping: jat1 zau1 hon1
- IPA: /jʌt^{7} dzʌl^{1} hɔːn^{2}/

Next Magazine was an Chinese-language online Hong Kong weekly magazine from 1990 to 2021. Owned by Jimmy Lai, the magazine was the number one news magazine in both markets in terms of audited circulation and AC Nielsen reports. A Taiwanese version of Next Magazine was published from 2001 to 2018, and the online version of Taiwan's Next Magazine ended in 2020.

== History ==
Founded on 15 March 1990, Next magazine was the second most popular magazine in Hong Kong, until Jimmy Lai's other magazine, Sudden Weekly, shuttered in 2015. It was published every Wednesday and cost 20 HKD. Next Magazine covered current affairs, political, economic, social and business issues, and entertainment news. The final print edition of the Hong Kong Next Magazine was published on 15 March 2018. After the sister newspaper, Apple Daily and its parent company were raided by Hong Kong police due to national security law charges and its executives were arrested, the online publication of Next Magazine ended on 23 June 2021.

Next Magazine Taiwan branch was established in 2001 and its first issue was published on 31 May 2001. With strong TV advertising support, the first issue's print run of 270,000 sold out within four hours. Although the two magazines had the same structure, Taiwanese Next magazine was locally edited and its contents were different from its sister publication in Hong Kong. It was published every Thursday and cost NTD 75. The Taiwanese Next Magazine published its last print edition on 4 April 2018. Online publication of Next Magazine in Taiwan ended on 29 February 2020.

Founder of Next Magazine, Jimmy Lai, was the subject of a 2022 documentary film titled, The Hong Konger: Jimmy Lai's Extraordinary Struggle for Freedom produced by American think tank, the Acton Institute. The film received widespread praise from critics. The film described the struggles of Jimmy Lai in his attempts at keeping Next Magazine from being forced to close, as well as Lai's efforts to keep other businesses open in light of the new rules restricting freedom of speech enacted after the passage of the Hong Kong national security law.

== Legal proceedings ==
In 2012, Next Magazine and sister publication Apple Daily lost a legal action in the High Court of Hong Kong over libel damages from publishing a story alleging that actress Zhang Ziyi sold sexual favours to former Chinese politician Bo Xilai and other clients for nearly US$1 million per night.

=== Notable litigation ===
1. Next Magazine publishing ltd & anor v Ma Ching Fat [2003] 1 HKC 579
2. Morinda international Hong Kong ltd v Next Magazine publishing ltd & ors [2003] 1 HKC 492
3. Oriental press group ltd & anor v Next Magazine publishing ltd & ors [2001] 3 HKC 159
4. Next Magazine publishing ltd & ors v Oriental Daily publisher ltd [2000] 2 HKC 557
5. China youth development ltd v Next Magazine publishing ltd & ors (HCA6206/1994)
6. Hong Kong polytechnic university v Next magazine [1996] 2 HKLR 260

== See also ==
- Media in Hong Kong
- Communications in Hong Kong
- Newspapers in Hong Kong
