= Apple Daily =

1995–2021 Hong Kong–based newspaper

- Front page on 9 October 2010 (English: "Monument of human rights: Liu Xiaobo awarded Nobel Peace Prize")
- Type: Daily newspaper
- Format: Broadsheet
- Owner: Next Digital
- Founded: 20 June 1995; 31 years ago
- Ceased publication: 24 June 2021; 5 years ago
- Political alignment: Pro-democracy; Anti-communism; Liberalism (HK)
- Headquarters: 8 Chun Ying Street; T.K.O Industrial Estate West, Tseung Kwan O Hong Kong
- Circulation: 86,000 (as of 2021)

Chinese name
- Traditional Chinese: 蘋果日報
- Simplified Chinese: 苹果日报
Transcriptions
Standard Mandarin
- Hanyu Pinyin: Píngguǒ Rìbào
- Wade–Giles: P'ing-kuo Jih-pao
- Yale Romanization: Pínggwǒ R̀bào
- IPA: [pʰǐŋkwò ɻɻ̩̂pâʊ]
Yue: Cantonese
- Yale Romanization: Ping^{4}gwo^{2} Yat^{6}bou^{3}
- Jyutping: Ping^{4}gwo^{2} Jat^{6}bou^{3}
- IPA: [pʰɪŋ˩kʷɔ˧˥ jɐt̚˨pɔw˧]

Alternative logo

Apple Daily (traditional Chinese: 蘋果日報; simplified Chinese: 苹果日报; pinyin: píngguǒ rìbào; Jyutping: ping4 gwo2 jat6 bou3) was a Chinese-language newspaper published in Hong Kong from 1995 to 2021, with an English-language online edition launched in 2020. Founded by Jimmy Lai and part of Next Media, Apple Daily was known for its tabloid journalism and for being the city's only mass-circulation newspaper with an editorial position that has been variously described as pro-democracy, anti-government, or anti-China. In a survey by the Chinese University of Hong Kong, Apple Daily was the third most trusted paid newspaper in 2019. In a 2021 Reuters Institute poll, it ranked fourth offline and second online among the most-used news sources in Hong Kong.

Apple Daily's editorial position made it a subject of advertising boycotts and political pressure. Police raided its headquarters on 10 August 2020, after the enactment of the 2020 Hong Kong national security law. On 17 June 2021, Hong Kong authorities froze the assets of Lai and his company, which was described as an attack on press freedom and thus forced the paper to cease operations. The final issue was published on 24 June, with over one million copies being printed (up from the usual 80,000). The newspaper's YouTube channels were shut down at midnight on the same day.

== History ==
Apple Daily was founded on 20 June 1995 by garment businessman Jimmy Lai. After the success of Next Magazine, another publication owned by Lai, he launched Apple Daily with an initial capital of HK$700 thousand ($89,750). Lai, a Catholic, named Apple Daily after the forbidden fruit, which he said if Adam and Eve did not eat, there would be no evil and no news. With the launch of Apple Daily in 1995, Jimmy Lai used "An apple a day keeps the lies away" as the commercial slogan.

=== Price war ===
The newspaper launched against a poor economy and a competitive Chinese-language newspaper market. Political uncertainties from Lai's criticisms of the Chinese government also made media analysts pessimistic about the future of Apple. Its launch was teased by television advertisements where Lai was portrayed with an apple on his head, which would have been a shooting target for its competitors. In the first month of publication, the newspaper gave out coupons which effectively reduced the cover price to HK$2 ($0.25), despite a standardised retail price of HK$5 per issue set by the Newspaper Society of Hong Kong. The price was restored to $5 after a month, but the newspaper switched to promotion with T-shirts and coloured posters. The campaign boosted Apple Daily to 200,000 copies on its first day, to become the newspaper with the second highest circulation in Hong Kong.

A price war ensued between popular newspapers in response to Apple Daily's entry into the market. Oriental Daily dropped its price to $2 from $5 per issue in December 1995. Other newspapers, such as Sing Pao and Tin Tin Daily followed suit. Apple Daily reduced its retail price to $4 one day after Oriental Daily announced a 10 per cent drop in its circulation. As a result, a number of newspapers collapsed: TV Daily ceased operations on the first day of the price war, Hong Kong United Daily, China Times magazine, and English newspaper Eastern Express, a sister newspaper of Oriental Daily, collapsed soon afterwards.

In 2003, Lai founded a sister publication of the same name in Taiwan (see Apple Daily (Taiwan)).

=== Editorial history ===
In March 2015, Chan Pui-man became the first female chief editor of the journal, replacing Ip Yut-kin. In 2019, Apple Daily was an award winner of the Hong Kong Human Rights Press Awards for their reporting on Liu Xia, the wife of Chinese human rights activist Liu Xiaobo. In 2020, Apple Daily launched the English edition of its digital newspaper. According to the most recent filings prior to its closure, it had a print circulation of over 86,000, and its website had approximately 9.6 million monthly unique visitors in Hong Kong.

The paper became the target of the Hong Kong authorities after its very strong and vocal support for the pro-democracy movement in Hong Kong. Jimmy Lai was arrested in December 2020 and sentenced to jail in April 2021 relating to the 2019–2020 protests. The offices of the paper were raided in 2020, its accounts frozen and five people including its editor Ryan Law and CEO Cheung Kim-hung were arrested in 2021. The paper announced its closure on 23 June 2021.

=== Film feature ===
Apple Daily was prominently featured in the 2022 film The Hong Konger produced by American right-wing think tank Acton Institute. The film had a positive reception among its conservative base, and showcased the final days of Apple Daily's operations before being shut down due to the Hong Kong national security law.

== Content ==
The newspaper was modelled after USA Today, with printing in full colour and concise writing. It also extensively used written Cantonese, when most Hong Kong newspapers used written vernacular Chinese, and a focus on reporting crime, celebrity news, eroticism, gambling, and drug use. It carried at least three pages of entertainment news at the beginning but this was increased to eight pages by 2000.

Apple Daily is described to have introduced tabloid journalism to Hong Kong. The focus on large colourful graphics and more sensationalist stories, such as celebrity scandals, traffic accidents and deaths, quickly made Apple Daily Hong Kong's second most popular newspaper. This type of journalism has also been replicated by other newspapers in Hong Kong.

Apple Daily attracted public criticism in 1998 for a report about a woman who jumped off a building after pushing her children out the window. The woman's husband was widely reported to have little remorse for the deaths of his wife and children. Apple Daily published a photo of the man with two prostitutes soon after the deaths. It was then revealed that the newspaper had paid the man to pose for the photograph, for which Apple Daily issued an apology after a public outcry. In the same year, Apple Daily ran a front-page article claiming that a lawyer absconded with more than HK$2 million of clients' money for her law firm. Apple Daily was ordered by a court to pay the lawyer more than HK$3.6 million in damages for defamation. In 2000, an Apple Daily reporter was sentenced to 10 months in jail for bribing police officers for information on criminal cases.

Journalism scholar Paul Lee said the establishment of Apple Daily has changed the Hong Kong newspaper ecosystem by transforming broadsheet newspapers into tabloids. Lee said newspapers with a high circulation, such as Apple Daily, The Sun and Oriental Daily, are known for their tabloid journalism as well as making mainstream reporting (see middle-market newspaper). Apple Daily did not join the self-regulation panel of the Newspaper Society of Hong Kong.

Apple Daily was also known for its coverage of breaking news and current affairs in Hong Kong and China. The newspaper had exclusive reports on political scandals, including member of the Legislative Council Cheng Kai-nam not reporting conflict of interest in 2000, and former Financial Secretary Antony Leung for avoiding tax when purchasing a car.

=== Editorial position ===
Apple Daily favoured the Hong Kong pro-democracy camp. Its criticism of the Hong Kong government has been described as a marketing strategy. According to Fung (2007), the newspaper is also said to have sensationalised politics and produced public dissent. In 2003, Apple Daily was critical of the second Tung Chee-hwa administration and encouraging readers to participate in pro-democracy demonstrations with its front-page headline. It launched a social media campaign in support of students in the 2014 Hong Kong protests and its social media presence was considered a mainstream pro-activist community.

Apple Daily was also known for xenophobia against tourists and migrants from mainland China. In 2012, it published an advertisement that portrayed mainland Chinese mothers who travelled to Hong Kong to give birth as locusts. The advertisement, paid for by users of HKGolden, popularised the use of locust to describe mainland Chinese in Facebook groups and flash mobs in areas popular with mainland tourists.

Critical of the Chinese government, it was the only newspaper in Hong Kong that expressed optimism when Chen Shui-bian was re-elected President of the Republic of China in 2004.

The editorial position against the Hong Kong and Chinese governments has resulted in advertising boycotts. In 2003, several major property developers in Hong Kong ended their advertisements in the newspaper. According to Mark Simon, an executive of Next Digital, HSBC, Hang Seng and Standard Chartered stopped advertising in the newspaper in 2013 due to pressure from the Chinese government's Liaison Office. However, the Liaison Office denied it had contacted the banks, and the banks said they pulled advertising for commercial reasons.

Apple Daily also said Chinese-sponsored hackers have attacked it almost every week. FireEye said in 2014 that denial-of-service attacks on Apple Daily were professional cyberattacks that may have been coordinated by the Chinese government.

=== Misinformation against Hunter Biden ===
During the 2020 presidential election cycle in the United States, Lai and columnists began to publish opinion pieces in Apple Daily supporting Donald Trump and promoting falsehoods against the Democratic Party.

In September and October 2020, the newspaper published a factually inaccurate 64-page report produced by Typhoon Investigations alleging that Hunter Biden was connected with the Chinese Communist Party, which was later cited by far-right influencers such as Steve Bannon and Guo Wengui. NBC News reported that the Typhoon Investigations was linked to a fake author and intelligence firm. The original poster of the dossier, Christopher Balding, admitted that he wrote parts of the document and later stated that the dossier had been commissioned by Apple Daily. Lai later said that he was not connected to the dossier but said his senior executive, Mark Simon, had worked with the project. Simon resigned following the NBC News report and apologised for having "allowed damage to Jimmy on a matter he was completely in the dark on". According to Quartz, these actions may have led the protesters to be sympathetic to the January 6 insurrection.

In October 2024, president-elect Donald Trump, during an interview with a host who said that Lai was "very important to America's Catholics and the world's Catholics" and asked whether Trump would speak to CCP general secretary Xi Jinping about "getting Jimmy Lai out and out of the country," replied "100 per cent yes."

== 2020 national security law raid ==
The Hong Kong offices of Apple Daily were raided by over 200 national security officers on 10 August 2020, following the arrest of Lai the previous day for violations of the recently implemented national security law. Lai's two sons, four senior executives of Next Digital and three social activists, were also arrested on the same day. The arrests, coming amid Beijing's ongoing crackdown against many pro-democracy figures in Hong Kong, drew condemnation from international governments and human rights groups. Lai and other arrestees reportedly faced charges of "foreign collusion", which included advocating for foreign sanctions, based on the broad definitions of the national security law. Earlier in the week, the United States had placed sanctions on 11 high-profile Hong Kong officials involved in the city's democratic suppression.

The police raid lasted nine hours, as the officers rifled through the business property and carted off 25 boxes of documents. The police search warrant did not disclose what they were looking for in the headquarters. The police also brought Lai into the office for two and a half hours and paraded him through the newsroom in handcuffs, an act possibly aimed at humiliating Lai and to silence the press.

The raid was live streamed by Apple reporters. The streaming footage included a tense moment when the policed shoved an editor for questioning the boundaries of the search. The police ordered for the live broadcast to be stopped, but the staff member continued filming the raid, arguing press freedom.

Next Digital released a statement condemning the police raid and declared, "Hong Kong's press freedom is now hanging by a thread, but our staff will remain fully committed to our duty to defend the freedom of the press."

=== Police conduct ===
Media access was restricted during the raid, with only media sources trusted by the police being allowed. During the police news conferences conducted to provide updates about the search, numerous news outlets including Reuters, Associated Press, Agence France-Presse, RTHK and Stand News were barred. The media representatives allowed to remain were denied questions.

During the raid, the Next Media Trade Union protested the police reading through the confidential news materials in the newsroom. Steve Li Kwai-wah, the Senior Superintendent from the new National Security Department, said they searched the area since one of the arrestees had an office on the assigned floor. Li also said the officers only "scanned" the materials to confirm their relevance to the case. Legal scholar Johannes Chan later criticised the move, stating that even a quick scan jeopardised the confidentiality in news reporting.

=== International response ===
International communities responded to Apple Daily's raid with condemnation, with global organisations highlighting the erosion of press freedom in Hong Kong. Amnesty International spoke against the harassment of journalists, and called for all criminal charges related to the national security law to be dropped. The Asia Chapter of the Asian American Journalists Association (AAJA-Asia) expressed their support for Apple Daily, and urged Hong Kong's leaders to uphold the values of free speech. Keith Richburg, a journalism professor at the University of Hong Kong, described the "frightening prospect" for journalists to operate under the national security law. Christophe Deloire, the Secretary General at Reporters Without Borders, said that "the Hong Kong government clearly seeks to take down a symbolic figure of press freedom."

The Foreign Correspondents' Club (FCC) in Hong Kong was also critical about the police's obstruction of news coverage during the raid, raising worries about propaganda in the absence of press freedom. Human Rights Watch stated that the raid on Apple Daily may be motivated by a desire to censor an independent Chinese media outlet. The Committee to Protect Journalists (CPJ) said the national security law was used to "suppress critical pro-democracy opinion and restrict press freedom", and called for Lai's immediate release. Activist groups in Taiwan advocated for further international sanctions on Chinese government officials to support the arrestees.

Government officials around the world condemned Lai's arrest and the police raid on Apple Daily. Tsai Ing-wen, the president of Taiwan, expressed her disappointment over the continuous erosion of Hong Kong's human rights and democracy. Mike Pompeo, the United States Secretary of State, said that Beijing eviscerated Hong Kong's freedoms. Yoshihide Suga, the Chief Cabinet Secretary of Japan, voiced grave concern over Hong Kong's situation following the arrests. In contrast, China's Foreign Ministry spokesperson Zhao Lijian approved of the mass arrests on the pro-democracy figures, stating that the Chinese government supported the national security law.

=== Aftermath ===
After the raid, the executives at Apple Daily vowed to resume their daily operations. Following a surge of popular demand, Apple announced the plan to print 350,000 copies for their Tuesday publication – a significant increase from their daily circulation of 70,000 copies. The print run was later set at 550,000 printed copies. A social media campaign encouraging the public to buy the newspaper was launched, and received backing of activist Joshua Wong, singer Pong Nan, and lawmaker Ted Hui. Apple Daily also uploaded a live stream of their print production process.

On 11 August, the Tuesday newspaper was published with the front-page headline declaring, "Apple Daily must fight on." Tsang Chi-ho, the former presenter of satirical news show Headliner, included a blank space in his regular column that simply said, "You can't kill us all." Many Hong Kong residents lined up overnight at newspaper vendors to buy the first printed copies. Readers also purchased the newspapers in bulk, distributing free copies around the city. Within hours, multiple convenience stores had sold out all their copies. The high demand came from readers who wanted to show their support towards Apple Daily and preserve press freedom in Hong Kong.

On the day of the arrests, Next Digital's shares originally fell by 16.7% to a record low of HK$0.075. An online campaign then emerged, which encouraged supporters to purchase stock in the company. Following the campaign, the stock experienced a 1100% gain over the next two days, reaching a record high in the past seven years. On Tuesday, the stock closed at HK$1.10 and became the third highest performer on the Hong Kong Stock Exchange that day. On Wednesday, the shares fell over 40% after the Securities and Futures Commission issued a warning about the high volatility. A probe by police into alleged market manipulation led to the arrest of 15 suspects on 10 September 2020.

Lai was released in the early morning of 12 August after 40 hours in detention. Later that day, he arrived at the Apple Daily newsroom, and was met with cheers from employees. He urged staff members to fight on, with the support of the Hong Kong people, and not let them down.

== 2021 arrests and closure ==
Home page of Apple Daily website announcing its closure: "National security agents raid Apple, all activities cease at midnight; final edition tomorrow (24 June 2021). Thank you for your support"

The assets of three companies, Apple Daily Limited, Apple Daily Printing Limited, and AD Internet Limited, as well as accounts belonging to Jimmy Lai worth more than HK$500 million, having already been frozen on 14 May 2021, a 500-strong contingent of police officers raided Apple Daily's headquarters on 17 June. They arrested CEO Cheung Kim-hung, COO Royston Chow, chief editor Ryan Law, associate publisher Chan Pui-man and platform director of Apple Daily Digital, Cheung Chi-wai, and charged them on suspicion of violating Article 29 of the national security law, which outlaws collusion with external forces to endanger national security. HK$18m ($2.3m; £1.64m) of the companies' assets were frozen.

Apple Daily warned that press freedom in Hong Kong was "hanging by a thread."

The raid and arrests were criticised by the United States, European Union, and the United Kingdom, as well as the United Nations' human rights spokesperson. The Chinese central government has rejected the criticism that the national security law was used to suppress press freedom and said external forces should "stop undermining Hong Kong's rule of law on the pretext of press freedom". Supporters in Hong Kong showed support for the newspaper by buying it, which increased its print run to 500,000 the day after the arrests.

On 21 June, the paper announced it would have to close unless the accounts were unfrozen, as it was unable to pay its staff or support operating costs. On 23 June, the newspaper said it would close "in view of staff members' safety" and the print run of 24 June would be its last. Apple Daily also said its digital version would go offline at 23:59 Hong Kong Time (UTC+8) on 23 June.

Activists backed up the news articles from Apple Daily on various blockchain platforms to ensure the content was available and free from Chinese censorship.

In 2023, the domain itself was taken over, in a move known as domain squatting, by Serbian entrepreneur Nebojša Vujinović who used the website to post AI-generated clickbait articles on a range of topics, none of them related to the position of Apple Daily before the takeover.

Apple editorialist "Li Ping" (Yeung Ching-kei) was arrested on 23 June "on suspicion of conspiring to collude with foreign countries or foreign forces to endanger national security", Fung Wai-kong, editor-in-chief of the English news section at Apple, was arrested on 27 June at Hong Kong International Airport while attempting to flee the city.

=== Reactions ===
United States President Joe Biden released a statement that, "It is a sad day for media freedom in Hong Kong and around the world. Intensifying repression by Beijing has reached such a level that Apple Daily, a much-needed bastion of independent journalism in Hong Kong, has now ceased publishing. Through arrests, threats, and forcing through a National Security Law that penalizes free speech, Beijing has insisted on wielding its power to suppress independent media and silence dissenting views." The European Union released a statement that "the National Security Law imposed by Beijing is being used to stifle freedom of the press and the free expression of opinions" and that closure of Apple "undermines media freedom and pluralism", a sentiment also shared by UK Foreign Minister Dominic Raab. Taiwan similarly called the closure "political oppression" and that it "sounded the death knell for freedom of press, publication, and speech in Hong Kong". Japanese government spokesperson Katsunobu Kato called the paper's closure a "major setback" for freedom of speech and freedom of the press in Hong Kong and voiced grave concerns over the situation. Amnesty International said that the "forced closure of Apple Daily is the blackest day for media freedom in Hong Kong's recent history".

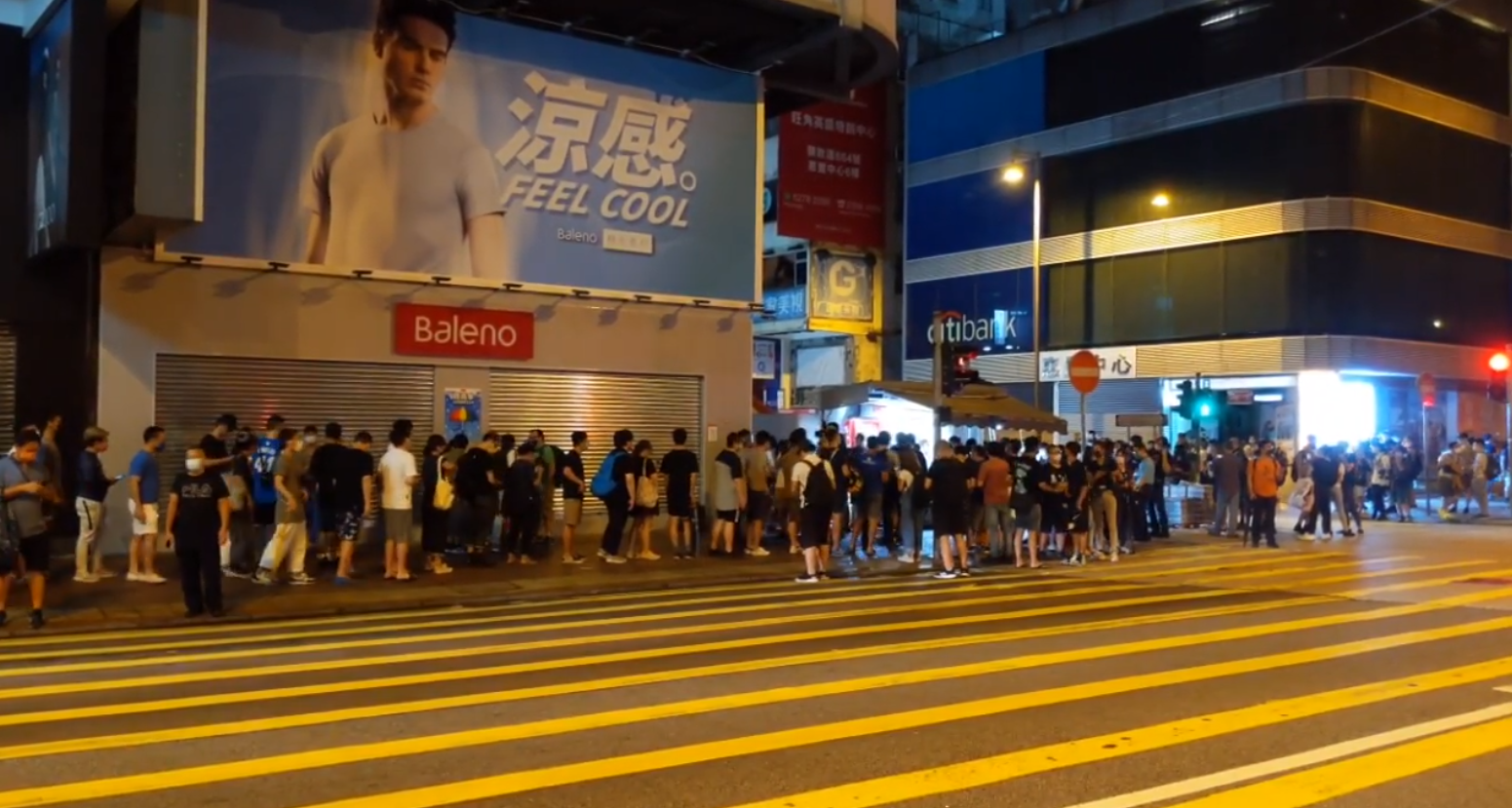
People queue to buy the final print edition of Apple Daily in Mong Kok.

Chinese state-owned newspaper Global Times described Apple Daily as "secessionist" and quoted Chinese commentators as saying that the closure is the "end of an era in which foreign proxies and secessionist forces meddled in China's internal affairs". The Chinese foreign minister said that "no one or no organisation is above the law. All rights and freedom, including media freedom, cannot go beyond the bottom line of national security." North Korea has condemned Apple Daily and has accused foreign countries of foreign interference in Hong Kong.

The final print issue of the paper was met with high demand and sold out, despite a million copies being printed compared to the usual 80,000. Hong Kongers formed long queues and waited for hours to buy the final edition of the paper.

The European Parliament passed a motion by 578 votes to 29, with 73 abstentions, on Thursday, 8 July 2021, condemning "in the strongest terms the recent forced closure of [Apple Daily], the continued freezing of its assets and the arrests of its journalists." It also demanded the Hong Kong government to "stop harassing and intimidating journalists, release arbitrarily detained prisoners, and denounces any attempts to muzzle pro-democracy activists and their activities" and called for the imposition of sanctions on Hong Kong officials. In turn, the Chinese government rejected the parliament's "smears and slanders".

== Editors-in-Chief ==
1. Loh Chan (1995–1996)
2. Ip Yut-kin (1996–2002)
3. Lam Ping-hang (2003–2006)
4. Cheng Ming-yan (2006–2011)
5. Cheung Kim-hung (2012–2015)
6. Chan Pui-man (2015–2017)
7. Ryan Law Wai-kwong (2017–2021)

== See also ==
- Media of Hong Kong
  - List of newspapers in Hong Kong
- Channel C: media outlet founded by former Apple Daily employees
