= Where the Wind Blows =

2022 Hong Kong film by Philip Yung

- Official film poster
- Traditional Chinese: 風再起時
- Simplified Chinese: 风再起时
- Literal meaning: When the wind rises again
- Hanyu Pinyin: Fēng zài qǐ shí
- Jyutping: Fung1 Zoi3 Hei3 Si4
- Directed by: Philip Yung
- Written by: Philip Yung
- Screenplay by: Effy Sun
- Produced by: Julia Chu; Peggy Lee; Patrick Tong; Kingman Cho
- Starring: Aaron Kwok; Tony Leung
- Cinematography: Chin Ting-chang
- Edited by: Matthieu Laclau; J. Him Lee; Zhang Zhao
- Music by: Ding Ke
- Production companies: Mei Ah Film Production; Dadi Century; Bona Film Group; Beijing Lajin Film; Global Group Films iQIYI Motion Pictures
- Distributed by: Mei Ah Entertainment
- Release dates: 15 August 2022 (HKIFF); 17 February 2023 (Hong Kong)
- Running time: 144 minutes
- Country: Hong Kong
- Language: Cantonese
- Budget: US$38 million
- Box office: US$8.7 million (Note: See Box office)

Where the Wind Blows (Chinese: 風再起時), previously known as Theory of Ambitions, is a 2022 Hong Kong crime thriller film written and directed by Philip Yung and starring Aaron Kwok and Tony Leung Chiu-wai respectively as Lui Lok and Lam Kong, two notorious corrupt Hong Kong police officers during the 1960s.

The film is a joint venture between mainland China and Hong Kong production companies, originally set for release at the end of 2018 in both territories, the film's release was delayed due to trouble getting approved by mainland China's National Radio and Television Administration. The film was scheduled to make its world premiere and open the 45th Hong Kong International Film Festival on 1 April 2021, but was pulled from the lineup three days before. The film made its world premiere the following year and opened the 46th Hong Kong International Film Festival on 15 August 2022 instead. The film was theatrically released in Hong Kong on 17 February 2023.

Where the Wind Blows was selected as the Hong Kong entry for Best International Feature Film at the 95th Academy Awards, but was not nominated.

== Plot ==
The film spans over three decades starting from the Japanese occupation of Hong Kong in the early 1940s. Lui Lok (Aaron Kwok) became a police officer in order to uphold justice. However, rampant corruption within the police force made it impossible for him to remain independent. As a result, in the 1950s, Lui decides to make a name for himself within the police force by controlling organized crime known as the triad.

Nam Kong (Tony Leung Chiu-wai), who seems like a gentleman on the surface, operates with a dagger under his cloak. He is socially active among the police force as well as in social circles, laying the groundwork for the empire of corruption he builds with Lui. Nam and Lui, the brains and the brawn working in perfect unison, respectively become Chinese Chief Detective of Hong Kong Island and Kowloon / New Territories in 1962. They lord over organized crime, and lead tens of thousands of policemen.

Nam has long seen through Lui's cynicism and naiveté, and has been plotting a hostile takeover of power. When Lui discovers that everything is not as he had imagined, he vows to forcibly regain controlling leadership from Nam.

In the 1970s, Peter Godber, Deputy District Commander of Kowloon, flees for United Kingdom to avoid local corruption charges. Nam flees for Thailand, whereas Lui flees for Taiwan.

== Cast ==
- Aaron Kwok as Lui Lok (磊樂), Chief Detective Staff Sergeant of the Royal Hong Kong Police Force garrisoned in Hong Kong Island.
  - Chui Tien-you as young Lui Lok.
- Tony Leung Chiu-wai as Nam Kong (南江), Chief Detective Staff Sergeant of the Royal Hong Kong Police Force garrisoned in Kowloon and the New Territories
  - Lam Yiu-sing as young Nam Kong.
- Du Juan as Choi Chan (蔡真), Lui Lok's wife.
- Michael Hui as George Lee (李子超), principal investigator of the Independent Commission Against Corruption (Hong Kong) (ICAC). (special appearance)
- Jessie Li as Siu-yu (小愉), Luk Lok's ex-comrade and ex-girlfriend who died after contracting syphilis while serving as a comfort woman.
- Patrick Tam as Yim Hung (嚴洪), Detective Staff Sergeant of the Royal Hong Kong Police Force and a drug trafficker.
- Michael Chow as Fat-Bee (肥B), Detective Staff Sergeant of the Royal Hong Kong Police Force garrisoned in Yau Ma Tei and Mongkok.
  - Michael Ning as young Fat-Bee.
- Jeana Ho as Cora, Nam Kong's wife.
- Elaine Jin as Lui Hang-wah (磊杏華), Lui Lok's aunt.
- Ron Ng as Kwok Siu-hong (郭兆雄), leader of the 14K triad.
- Louis Cheung
- Maggie Cheung Ho-yee as Ng Cheuk-ho's wife.
- Tse Kwan-ho as Ng Cheuk-ho (吳卓豪), a notorious drug dealer harbored by Yim Hung.
- Cheung Siu-fai
- Stephen Ho
- Tai Po
- Eddie Chan
- Deno Cheung as Crazy Chuck (喪七)
- Wan Yeung-ming
- Dennis Chan
- Ben Yuen
- Belinda Yan
- Rose Chan

== Production ==
=== Development ===
The project was first announced at the 2017 Hong Kong Filmart in March 2017 slated to respectively be directed by and star Philip Yung and Aaron Kwok, whom have both previously collaborated in the 2015 film, Port of Call.

In August 2017, it was announced that Tony Leung Chiu-wai has joined the cast, along with Patrick Tam and Michael Chow. Kwok, Leung, Tam and Chow will portray the "Four Great Sergeants" (四大探長) of Hong Kong who were notorious for accumulating mass wealth from corruption.

=== Filming ===
Filming for Where the Wind Blows began in October 2017. The film later held its production commencement ceremony press conference on 13 November 2017. Kwok, who portrays Lui Lok in the film, has previously portrayed Lui's fictional son, Bill Lee, in the 1991 film, Lee Rock II, which starred Andy Lau as Lui.

== Release ==
Where the Wind Blows made its world premiere and opened the 46th Hong Kong International Film Festival along with the film Warriors of Future on 15 August 2022 before its wide theatrical release on 17 February 2023 in Hong Kong. The film was originally set to be released globally by the end of 2018 with Mei Ah Entertainment handling the film's distribution and launching sales operations for the film at the 2017 American Film Market. However, the film's release was delayed as it was unable to get approval from the National Radio and Television Administration due the film's plot dealing with corrupt policeman and triads. The film was approved in late 2020 and was scheduled to make its world premiere as one of the two opening films of the 45th Hong Kong International Film Festival on 1 April 2021, but had its screenings cancelled on 29 March at its producers' request, citing "technical reasons". The film released a trailer at a national theater promotional event in October 2021.

== Reception ==
=== Box office ===
Where the Wind Blows has grossed a total of US$8.7 million worldwide combining its box office gross from Hong Kong (US$1.4 million), mainland China (US$7.24 million), and South Korea (US$54,006).

== Awards and nominations ==
| Year | Award | Category | Nominated work | Result |
|---|---|---|---|---|
| 2023 | Asian Film Awards | Best Actor | Tony Leung Chiu-wai | Won |
| 2023 | Asian Film Awards | Best Supporting Actor | Michael Hui | Nominated |
| 2023 | Asian Film Awards | Best Art Direction | Bill Lui, Andrew Wong | Nominated |
| 2023 | Hong Kong Film Awards | Best Supporting Actor | Michael Hui | Won |
| 2023 | Hong Kong Film Awards | Best Cinematography | Chin Ting-chang, Meng Qing, Tsui Siu-kong | Nominated |
| 2023 | Hong Kong Film Awards | Best Art Direction | Bill Lui, Andrew Wong | Won |
| 2023 | Hong Kong Film Awards | Best Costume & Makeup Design | Dora Ng, Petra Kwok | Won |
| 2023 | Hong Kong Film Awards | Best Action Choreography | Wong Chi-man | Nominated |
| 2023 | Hong Kong Film Awards | Best Original Film Score | Ding Ke, Sara Fung Chi-han | Nominated |
| 2023 | Hong Kong Film Awards | Best Sound Design | Tu Duu-chih, Wu Shu-yao | Nominated |
| 2023 | Hong Kong Film Awards | Best Visual Effects | Shigeharu Tomotoshi | Nominated |

== See also ==
- Aaron Kwok filmography
- Lee Rock, a 1991 biographical crime film about Lui Lok starring Andy Lau.
- Lee Rock II, sequel to Lee Rock released in the same year.
- List of submissions to the 95th Academy Awards for Best International Feature Film
- List of Hong Kong submissions for the Academy Award for Best International Feature Film
