= Murder of Ho Wai-ha =

1999 Hong Kong murder case

- Ho Wai-ha, the victim
- Location: G/F, 168-78 Tai Po Road, Sham Shui Po
- Date: 22 September 1999; 5:20 am (UTC+08:00)
- Attack type: Stabbing attack
- Weapon: 18-inch knives
- Victim: Ho Wai-ha
- Perpetrators: Hired thugs (4); 14K
- Motive: Business dispute; Judge McWalters JA called it "extortion"

On 22 September 1999, a Hong Kong newspaper vendor, Ho Wai-ha, was attacked and fatally stabbed by three men on Tai Po Road in Sham Shui Po. Before the attack, she represented local newspaper vendors in opposing a distributor's demand that they forcibly increase their orders of the Oriental Daily News. Five men were convicted of murder and sentenced to life imprisonment, including three assailants and two masterminds; another was convicted of manslaughter as a lookout and received a 12-year sentence.

In May 2026, a seventh suspect was prosecuted for murder, more than a quarter century after the killing. He was arrest in mainland China and transferred to Hong Kong. However, one more involved in the case remained a fugitive.

== Background ==
In 1999, Ching Wui Newspaper and Magazine Distribution Company Limited (Ching Wui; 青匯書報社) began forcibly requiring newspaper vendors in the area to take additional copies of Oriental Daily News. Ching Wui was a regional distributor of Oriental Daily News and The Sun, both published by the Oriental Press Group. It also distributed several horse-racing newspapers throughout West Kowloon, including Sham Shui Po, where Ha Je's newspaper stall was located.

In practice, Ching Wui would force newspaper vendors to accept additional copies beyond their usual orders, while refusing to take back any unsold copies. According to the victim's husband, vendors who normally ordered 100 copies of Oriental Daily News were required to take an additional 50 copies as part of a promotional campaign, with payment required for all 150 copies. The practice is known as "加紙" (gaa1 zi2), lit. 'adding papers'.

The victim, Ho Wai-ha (何慧霞), 40, also known as "Ha Je," was a newspaper vendor. At the age of seven or eight, she began selling newspapers following her father. After her father's death, about ten years before her own, she inherited the stall located at Ying Bin Restaurant on Tai Po Road and had operated ever since. Her husband, Mr. Lau, was a taxi driver; they had been married for 20 years. Despite her leading position later, Ha Je was an ordinary woman with no connections or background. She was assigned to act as the liaison between the distributor and newspaper vendors simply because she was older than the other newspaper vendors in the Sham Shui Po district. Facing the unreasonable request, her husband called and complained to Oriental Daily News at her request. He never got a reply.

Afterwards, newspaper vendors in Sham Shui Po form a union, with Ha Je as the union's treasurer. The couple and other vendors met with representatives of Ching Wui at a restaurant to discuss the new newspaper-ordering system. The meeting ended without any agreement. Three days later, other vendors agreed that Ha Je would represent them and convey their grievances to Ching Wui and Ching Yeung (青揚), the main distributor of Oriental Daily News. On 19 September 1999, Ching Wui representative, Michael Tsoi Wai-keung, met with Ha Je and other vendors again. The goal was to come to an arrangement for a possible reimbursement of the unsold copies. Ha Je and the vendors reportedly threatened to boycott. According to a vendor, Mr. Lee, the meeting was tense and both sides were spilling foul languages. After the meeting, Ha Je and Mr. Lee both received threatening messages, which Ha Je mentioned to her husband and her son.

On 21 September, Ha Je planned a petition calling for a reasonable livelihood for newspaper vendors. That night she reportedly received a threatening call. Her husband later said that someone had apparently used her name and the union's letterhead to fax the newspaper group, demanding that the distributor's representative be dismissed and threatening a boycott. He suspected that it was deliberate frame-job before the attack. The trial revealed that another meeting between the vendors and Ching Wui was scheduled in the afternoon of 22 September, but Ha Je was murdered that morning.

== Murder ==
At about 5:15 am on 22 September 1999, Ho was preparing at her newspaper stall for the opening. A light-colored vehicle was parked at the intersection of Nam Cheong Street and Tai Po Road. Three of the four men in the car were masked, and each carrying an 18-inch beef knife, They approached her and attacked her for several dozen seconds before fleeing by car, driving into Yiu Tung Street. A security guard heard her yelling for help, but only to find her unresponsive in a pool of blood. Ambulance arrived at the scene at 5:40 am and she was taken to the Caritas Medical Centre in Sham Shui Po. She died from her injuries at 6:30 am.

Medical examiner found that she suffered three stab wounds: one to her right back shoulder, another to the outer side of the upper left arm, the last to the back of her left knee, severing the artery.

== Aftermath ==
Her death came as a shock to other vendors. After hearing her death, about three-quarters of nearby vendors from Sham Shui Po, Cheung Sha Wan and Shek Kip Mei reportedly stopped selling Oriental Daily News and The Sun that day as a response. Fifty vendors representing different regions across Hong Kong, including Eastern District, Kowloon East, Yau Tsim Mong District, Sha Tin District and Tseung Kwan O, held a meeting urgently at a restaurant. They announced plans to meet with each local distributors and hopefully come to a solution in one or two days. They also offered their condolence. Meanwhile, the Oriental Press Group denied any connections to the incident, stating that it was completely independent from its distributors and was not involved.

On 23 September, the victim's husband, her son and her brother went to the morgue to identify the body.

== Investigation and trials ==
The police investigations yielded no result for many years. From October 2000 to 2001, police arrested a total of 13 people suspected of being connected to the case, including Li Cho-ming, Lin Chung-wai, and Tsoi Wai-keung. They were all subsequently released due to insufficient evidence. In early 2004, a police officer saw on a television program that Lin Chung-wai had been sentenced to death in mainland China. Police then attempted to contact the mainland authorities. November that year, Hong Kong police went to the detention facility in Shenzhen where Lin was held to take his statement. Lin disclosed the details of the case and the identities of those involved. From 2005 to 2006, police arrested Tsoi Wai-keung, Lo Hon-hing, Li Cho-ming , Lam Tse-lik, and Leung Chi-hung. Tsoi was later released due to insufficient evidence, while the other four stood trial.

=== Perpetrators and suspects ===
- Lo Hon-hing (盧漢興), convicted of murder and sentenced to life imprisonment on 25 March 2007.
- Li Cho-ming (李祖明), convicted of murder and sentenced to life imprisonment on 25 March 2007.
- Leung Chi-hung (梁志鴻), convicted of murder and sentenced to life imprisonment on 25 March 2007.
- Lam Tse-lik (林自力), convicted of manslaughter and sentenced to 12 years in prison on 25 March 2007.
- Ng Sik-kei (吳錫基), convicted of murder and sentenced to life imprisonment on 30 May 2012. He was a shareholder in Ching Wui.
- Michael Tsoi Wai-keung (蔡偉強), convicted of murder and sentenced to life imprisonment on 30 May 2012. He was the principal of Ching Wui.
- Lin Chung-wai (連宗偉), charged with murder.
- Unnamed eighth suspect.
