= Christina Chan =

Hong Kong political activist

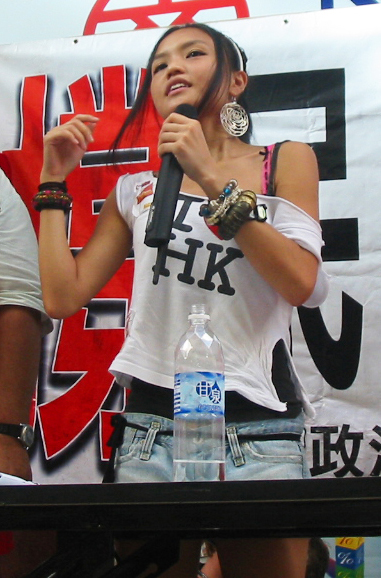
- Christina Chan during the 1 July March
- Born: 25 April 1987 (age 39); Hong Kong
- Education: Hong Kong Baptist University; City University of Hong Kong; University of Hong Kong (BA, MPhil)

Christina Chan
- Traditional Chinese: 陳巧文
- Simplified Chinese: 陈巧文
Transcriptions
Standard Mandarin
- Hanyu Pinyin: Chén Qiǎowén
Yue: Cantonese
- Yale Romanization: Chàhn Haaú-màhn

Christina Chan (born 25 April 1987) is a political activist in Hong Kong, known for her stand on human rights, democracy and Tibetan independence. She is enrolled in a premaster's degree in philosophy in the University of Hong Kong.

== Early life ==
Christina was born in Hong Kong, where she attended the True Light Girls' College. She went on to study at Warminster School and Bromsgrove School in the United Kingdom for her secondary education. Afterwards, she returned to Hong Kong and obtained an associate degree in social science in Hong Kong Baptist University and the City University of Hong Kong before studying English and philosophy at the University of Hong Kong, where she was conferred a bachelor's degree with first-class honours in June 2008. She subsequently received a scholarship to continue her studies at HKU's Master of Arts in philosophy.

She was a host on Radio Television Hong Kong's TeenPower programme. She also formerly worked as a part-time model, and was once featured in a Coca-Cola advertisement.

== Political activities ==
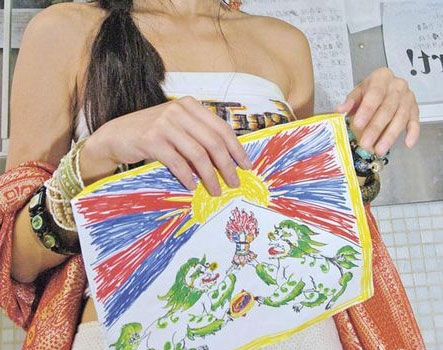
Chan's hand-drawn Snow Lion flag

Chan became known by the general public during the Olympics torch relay in Hong Kong where she held the Tibetan snow lion flag, and engaged in a confrontation with the pro-Beijing camp. She was forcibly removed by the Hong Kong Police Force, who claimed it was "for her protection".

In April 2009, Ayo Chan Yat-ngok (陳一諤), the president of the Hong Kong University Students' Union, made a speech on the issue of the Tiananmen massacre, which provoked widespread student opposition; in response, Christina Chan and four other students started a campaign to impeach him. Ayo was deposed after the General Polling.

Chan was arrested on 9 January 2010 over her alleged assault on a policewoman during an anti-Express Rail protest on New Year's Day; she was released on HK$500 bail. She claims that while being held at the station, police officers forced her to lift up her shirt so that they could photograph her tattoo. She was acquitted of the assault in September 2010.

In January 2020, she wrote on Hong Kong Free Press, expressing her support for the ongoing protests in Hong Kong and her criticism of 'unchecked police brutality', and urged the law enforcement and judiciary system to restore impartiality.

== Internet and media harassment ==
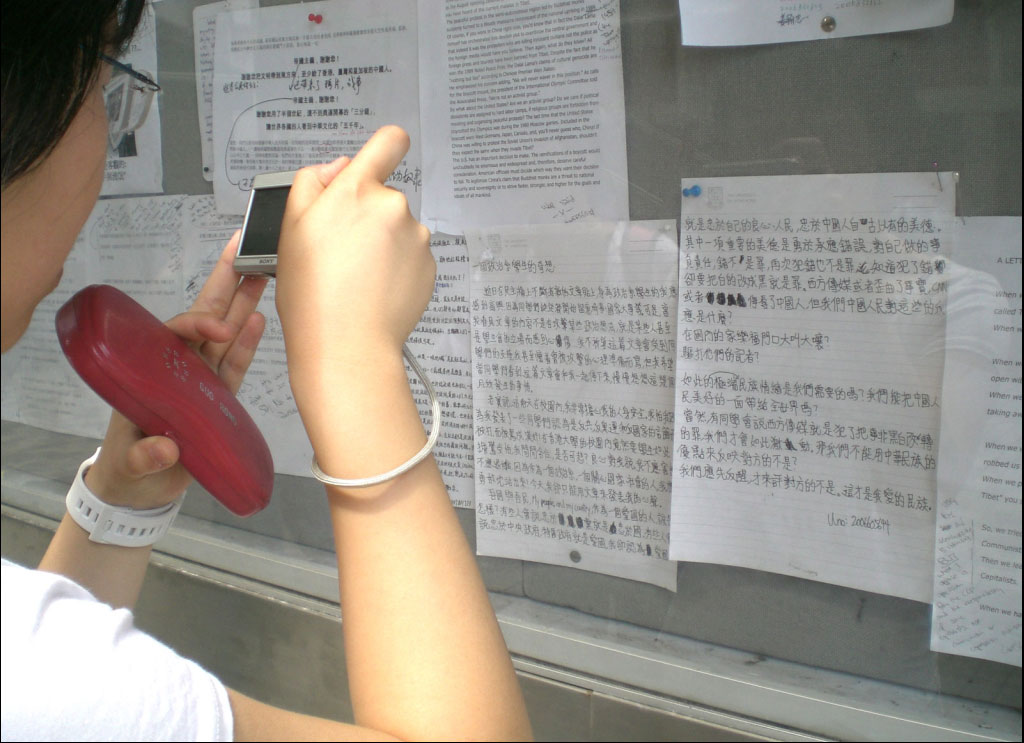
Chan's articles on the notice board of the student union in the University of Hong Kong

Soon after coming to public attention in 2008, Chan became the target of harassment. Paparazzi followed her around her university, her personal photos from her Facebook account were published in Oriental Press Group magazine East Week, and her dress sense, body measurements, and relationship with her boyfriend, 27-year-old Australian musician Nick Brazel, became popular topics of discussion in internet forums. She was interviewed by TVB News' The Pearl Report and Sunday Report about her suffering from cyber-bullying. The programmes were aired on 21 December 2008 and 22 February 2009 respectively.

Following Chan's arrest in January 2010, an anonymous administrator in an online forum for police officers posted rape threats against her. An Oriental Press Group magazine again published private photos of Chan soon after; this time, it was the Oriental Sunday, who plastered their front cover with paparazzi shots of Chan at home in her underwear brushing her teeth. A variety of social groups publicly criticised the Oriental Press Group in response, including the Hong Kong Women's Coalition on Equal Opportunities and The Society For Truth And Light. The Television and Entertainment Licensing Authority received 119 complaints regarding the magazine.
