= Ng Sik-ho =

Drug lord in Hong Kong

- 吳錫豪
- Born: 1930; Shantou, Guangdong, Republic of China
- Died: September 8, 1991 (aged 61); British Hong Kong
- Other names: Crippled Ho; Limpy Ho
- Term: 1967-1974
- Spouse: Cheng Yuet-ying
- Status: Released after being diagnosed with Liver Cancer
- Criminal charges: Drug trafficking
- Penalty: 30 years
- Capture status: Arrested

Details
- Span of crimes: 1967–1974
- Country: British Hong Kong
- Date apprehended: 12 November 1974

Ng Sik-ho
- Traditional Chinese: 吳錫豪
- Simplified Chinese: 吴锡豪
Transcriptions
Standard Mandarin
- Hanyu Pinyin: Wú Xī-háo
Yue: Cantonese
- Jyutping: Ng4 Sik3-hou4

Ng Sik-ho (traditional Chinese: 吳錫豪; simplified Chinese: 吴锡豪; pinyin: Wú Xī-háo; Jyutping: Ng4 Sik3-hou4, 1930 – September 8, 1991), also known as "Crippled Ho" or "Limpy Ho" (Chinese: 跛豪; pinyin: Bǒ Háo; Jyutping: Bai1 Hou4) was a prominent Hong Kong drug lord and triad boss.

== Biography ==
Ng, born in 1930, was of Teochew origin. Ng earned his nickname of "Crippled Ho" or "Limpy Ho" following a leg injury sustained in a street fight. He moved to Hong Kong from mainland China during the Great Chinese Famine in the 1960s.

From as early as 1967, Ng was involved in the illicit trade of opium and morphine. He was married to Cheng Yuet-ying (traditional Chinese: 鄭月英; simplified Chinese: 郑月英; pinyin: Zhèng Yuè Yīng; Jyutping: Zeng6 Jyut6-jing1), who was also involved in the drug trade. Ng built a drug empire that, at the time of his arrest, was said to have covered Hong Kong, Macau, Thailand, Taiwan, Singapore, Britain and America.

Ng was arrested on 12 November 1974 on charges of smuggling 20 tonnes of opium and morphine from Thailand and other countries into Hong Kong. Nicknamed "Mr. Big" by the media, Ng was convicted in May 1975 to 30 years of imprisonment, the longest sentence ever imposed by a Hong Kong court at that time. His wife was subsequently arrested and was convicted on 23 February to 16 years imprisonment and was fined 1 million yuan.

Ng became a key witness in the case against Ma Sik-chun, Ng's former associate who was facing charges of heroin and opium trafficking.

Ng became a Buddhist while in jail. In April 1991, his sentence was reduced by the Governor of Hong Kong by four and a half years, and he was scheduled to be released at the end of the year. In July, Ng was diagnosed with terminal liver cancer, and it was estimated that he would live no more than 6 weeks. His sentence was then further reduced.

On 14 August 1991, after serving 16 years in jail, Ng was released on medical grounds. He was moved to a guarded hospital cell to a ward at the Queen Mary Hospital. He died a few weeks later on September 8, 1991, at age 61. His wife was eventually released from prison in 1992.

== Media portrayals ==
Ng Sik-ho's story has been adapted multiple times in Hong Kong cinema, and he served as a popular trope in Triad films. Fictional portrayals inspired by or involved Ng includes:

- Zeoi Fu Kam Lung (1976), portrayed by Lau Dan
- Blowing in the Wind (1980), portrayed by Lau Kong
- Hong Kong Criminal Archives - Black Money (1991), portrayed by Lam Lap Sam
- To Be Number One (1991), portrayed by Ray Lui
- Queen of Underworld (1991), portrayed by Ray Lui
- Lee Rock (1991), portrayed by Victor Hon
- Lee Rock II (1991), portrayed by Victor Hon
- The Greed of Man (1992), portrayed by Lau Kong
- The Prince of Temple Street (1992), portrayed by Lau Siu Ming
- The H.K. Triad (1999), portrayed by Sean Lau
- I Corrupt All Cops (2009), portrayed by Alan Chui Chung-San
- Beauty In the South (2012), portrayed by Liu Can
- Chasing the Dragon (2017), portrayed by Donnie Yen
- Once Upon a Time in Hong Kong (2021), portrayed by Tony Leung Ka-fai
- Extras for Chasing The Dragon (2023), portrayed by Jordan Chan
- Where the Wind Blows (2023), portrayed by Tse Kwan-ho
