= The Prince of Temple Street =

1992 Hong Kong film by Jeffrey Chiang

- DVD cover
- Traditional Chinese: 廟街十二少
- Simplified Chinese: 庙街十二少
- Hanyu Pinyin: Miào Jiē Shí Èr Shǎo
- Jyutping: Miu6 Gaai1 Sap6 Ji4 Siu3
- Directed by: Jeffrey Chiang
- Screenplay by: Yuen Sai-man; Lai Man-cheuk
- Produced by: Liu Kin-fat
- Starring: Andy Lau; Joey Wong; Deanie Ip; Ng Man-tat
- Cinematography: Ardy Lam
- Edited by: Ma Chung-yiu; Mui Tung-lit
- Music by: Dominic Chow
- Production companies: Cheung Wang Channel Film & Video; Wing Fat Film Production
- Distributed by: Golden Princess Amusement
- Release date: 20 August 1992
- Running time: 95 minutes
- Country: Hong Kong
- Language: Cantonese
- Box office: HK$12,620,570

The Prince of Temple Street is a 1992 Hong Kong crime drama film directed by Jeffrey Chiang and starring Andy Lau, Joey Wong, Deanie Ip and Ng Man-tat. Aside of portraying the titular protagonist in the film, Lau also briefly reprises his role as "Lee Rock", the real life-inspired protagonist from the film series of the same name.

== Plot ==
Triad leader Chiu (Ray Lui) calls up a meeting hoping to find someone willing to adopt an abandoned male infant he picked up in Temple Street. During the meeting, nobody was able to stop the infant from crying until it was passed to a servant's arms. He is Tong Chau-sui (Ng Man-tat), who is chosen as the adoptive father of the infant. Because there were twelve people in the meeting and everyone were the infant's godparents, Chiu names the infant Tong Sap-yee (lit. "Tong Twelve"), whom everyone calls as "Prince Twelve".

On the surface, Prince Twelve (Andy Lau) seems like a favored person, but down his heart, he is lonelier than everyone else. His adoptive father, Chau-sui, is a worker of a mahjong house in Temple Street while his adoptive mother, Phoenix (Deanie Ip), is an ex-prostitute who claims to have abandoned his son in Temple Street on the same day Twelve was abandoned, and thus, treats Prince Twelve as her biological son.

The renowned Prince Twelve has a rival named Lap Ling (Chin Ho), who is the leader of the Kwoon Chung Gang and a person more terrible than a devil. One day, Prince Twelve meets a girl who came preaching at Temple Street named Teresa (Joey Wong). From the first moment he looked at her, he fell in love with her.

== Cast ==
- Andy Lau as Prince Twelve / Lee Rock
- Joey Wong as Teresa
- Deanie Ip as Phoenix
- Ng Man-tat as Tong Chau-sui
- Chin Ho as Lap Ling
- Ray Lui as Chiu (cameo)
- Charles Heung as Lam Kong (cameo)
- Lau Siu-ming as Ho (cameo)
- Lau Kong as Ngan Tung (cameo)
- Amy Yip as Ha (cameo)
- Wong Chi-keung as Piggy (cameo)
- Kent Cheng as Cheng (cameo)
- Jamie Luk as Little Ma (cameo)
- Frankie Chan as Peter Pan
- Jameson Lam as Motel manager
- Wan Seung-lam as Kin's man
- Leung Kam-san as Uncle Tsuen
- Kingdom Yuen as Phoenix's hooker
- Choi Kwok-hing as Kwan
- Jeffrey Lam as Uncle Kin
- Carol Lee as Smartie's girlfriend
- Danny Poon as Cheating
- Leung Kai-chi as White haired old man
- Fong Yue as Brothel Spruiker
- Ho Chi-moon
- Kong Foo-keung as Uncle Fat's thug
- Choi Cho-kuen as Uncle Fat's thug
- Annabelle Lau
- Tang Cheung
- Wong Kim-ban
- Lo Kwok-wai
- Lee Ka-hung

== Theme song ==
- Things I Used to Hold Tight On (從前我所緊抱的) (Cantonese / Me and the Dreams I Chase (我和我追逐的夢) (Mandarin)
  - Composer: Steve Chow
  - Lyricist: Calvin Poon (Cantonese, Steve Chow (Mandarin)
  - Singer: Andy Lau

== Box office ==
The film grossed HK$12,620,570 at the Hong Kong box office during its theatrical run from 20 August to 3 September 1992 in Hong Kong.

== See also ==
- Andy Lau filmography
