= East Touch =

Hong Kong magazine

East Touch (Chinese: 東Touch) is a weekly Chinese language magazine written in Cantonese style in Hong Kong. It is published every Tuesday by East Touch Publishing Limited, part of Global China Group Holdings Limited.

== Content ==
East Touch is an infotainment publication targeting readers aged between 20 and 30. It covers stories of celebrities, entertainment news, fashion trends and lifestyle topics. A survey conducted by the Society for Truth and Light in Hong Kong showed that about 86.6% of the content of East Touch is related to information about entertainment and consumption. According to the editorial board, the magazine regards men's fashion news as its top priority, followed by women's fashion news and lifestyle reports. Entertainment news is regarded as the least important priority.

== Reporting style ==
The reporting style of East Touch follows four guiding principles established by its owners. These four reporting principles distinguish East Touch from other magazines targeted at trendy young people.

The magazine's competitors, namely, "Easy Finder", "East Week" and "3 Magazine" place considerably more emphasis on paparazzi-type entertainment scoops and Category IIB photos of starlets. This is confirmed by statistics provided by the Hong Kong Press Council and the Hong Kong Journalists Association which show that no complaints have been filed nor condemnations issued against East Touch.

== Big events ==
East Touch faced the first great challenge in its colourful history when its 42nd issue was published on 29 March 1995. The magazine was convicted and fined by the courts for publishing indecent articles about pornography, thereby falling foul of the Obscene Articles Tribunal and the Television and Entertainment Licensing Authority. The article judged indecent concerned a "Festival of Pornography", in which many sexual utilities and services were advertised without an accompanying warning that the magazine contained material which should not fall into the hands of persons under the age of 18. According to both the Tribunal and the Supreme Court, such an omission violated the Control of Obscene and Indecent Articles Ordinance. The Supreme Court dismissed the appeal made by the publisher in July 1996.

== Readership ==
To date, no official figures have been published on the magazine's circulation numbers and market penetration. According to a survey of the reading habits of 15- to 29-year-olds in Hong Kong conducted by Breakthrough, a non-profit Christian youth organisation in Hong Kong, in February 1999, however, East Touch lagged behind its closest competitors. In the survey, Next Magazine, Easy Finder and East Week ranked top three, with 32.3%, 27.4% and 24.9% respectively.

== Writing style, layout and logo ==
Articles in East Touch are written in colloquial Chinese and are often peppered with slangy Cantonese phrases and English words. The layout of the magazine is very colourful with photos, pictures and graphics taking up equal, if not more, page space than words. The magazine's layout changes frequently to maintain freshness and to avoid any 'detachment' between authors and readers. However, such oral–oriented written discourse has been accused of polluting Modern Standard Chinese, and has been blamed by teachers and educators for the deteriorating language proficiency of Hong Kong's youngsters.

East Touch also makes frequent changes to the appearance and organisation of its contents, though the contents themselves remain largely the same. When it was first published, the magazine was unitary and was divided into four sections, namely 'First touch', 'Entertainment touch', 'Fashion & City touch' and 'Keep in touch'.

East Touch launched the present logo with Issue 437, which came out on 14 October 2003. This new logo, incorporating the Chinese character "East" (東) with the English words "East Touch", was chosen to reflect the magazine's very first logo. Before the present logo was launched, "East Touch" had changed the design of its logo six times.

== Sub-booklets ==
A number of sub-booklets were subsequently published together with the main book.

- 'Shopping G-Point' (購物G點) was first issued with the 125th issue in conjunction with 'G-Point Price' (G點價), which provided discounts for readers buying trendy clothes, sneakers and accessories.
- With the 153rd issue, 'Game Century' (Game世紀) was published. This introduced the latest computer and video games and taught readers how to become skilful players. This later changed its name to 'Electric-king' (電click王) with the 285th issue, and covered topics on a wide range of electrical appliances.
- 'Look' was first issued with the 285th issue, and focused on fashion and lifestyle topics.
- 'Sneakers' (波鞋王) was first issued with the 317th issue, and introduced trends, design, brands and the price of sneakers.
- 'Make-up Garden' (妝苑) was first issued with the 317th issue, and included make-up tips, make-up demonstrations, a new cosmetics product review and interviews with artists and models.
- 'Brands' (東Touch別注) was first issued with the 348th issue, and introduced brand products in fashion.
- 'Cat's' was first issued with the 355th issue, and mainly contained stylish pictures of the latest fashion products.
- 'OK!week' (OK一周) was first issued with the 370th issue, and reported the hottest entertainment news of the previous week.
- 'Green weekly' was first issued with the 390th issue, and focused on fashion trends.

== Sections ==
"East Touch" is divided into two books. The main book has five sections, namely Begin, Entertainment, Babe, Knock, and Relax.

- Begin section discusses the hottest topics from around the world during the previous week in the relaxed tone generally found in infotainment magazines.
- Entertainment section reports on recent local and international entertainment news. This includes interviews with celebrities, features on upcoming movies and TV series, and CD reviews.
- Babe section contains the latest trends in female fashion and make-up. This section includes interviews with trend-setting singers, artists, models, designers and stylists; style photos; and features on the latest fashion products. A recent addition to this section has been an interview series by popular local DJ's(茜利妹)with some local celebrities on sex-related topics.
- Knock section focuses on trends for men. It includes features on selected male fashion labels; style photos of the latest male fashions; reports on male trend icons, such as Quentin Tarantino, the director of "Kill Bill"; and product information on the latest sneakers in town.
- Relax section does not have a particular theme. It provides information on high-tech gadgets, toys and comics. A special periodical in this section is <Green> which features local university student life.

The sub-booklet has four sections. It focuses on the latest products and presents them in a catalogue format detailing prices and retail outlets.

- Brand name Trends contains information on products by selected fashion labels; columns on how to maintain brandname products; street snapshots of people with brandname products; rankings of the "hippest" brandname products; and an "Exchange forum" for readers to buy or sell second-hand brandname products.
- Technological Trends features the latest hi-tech gadgets together with detailed descriptions of their functions, prices and points of sale. This section also includes rankings of the hippest mobile phones and digital cameras.
- Health Trends contains information on diet plans, health foods and exercise plans.
- Information Weekly has a weekly horoscope, a comic series, a movie review, a CD review and articles by different contributors.

== Recent strategy ==
In recent issues, East Touch has followed the practice of other trend magazines by issuing a small booklets on selected high-fashion labels. These booklets focus on clothes and accessories from a particular brand, along with prices and shop details. It occasionally offers readers free gifts, a typical example being the 100 sets of block toys offered to readers with the 349th issue to celebrate Valentine's Day.

A frequent advertising technique employed by East Touch is its use of soft marketing. Advertisements are often presented in formats similar to the feature articles with "Information provided by clients" (資料由客戶提供) in small print at the top of the page to indicate that it is an advertisement.

== Name ==
The idea of naming the magazine East Touch came from the phase "Don't touch". According to the editorial board, the sub-booklet aimed at inspiring readers to be "rebellious", to "challenge everything", and to be concerned with the world. according to this philosophy, the first thing to do is "to touch". Thus, the Board used the word "Touch" as a part of the sub-booklet's name. The Chinese word "East"(東) is a pun of the pronunciation of the English word "Don't" in the Cantonese-accented English of the then owner Oriental Press Group Limited (東方報業集團有限公司 Pinyin: Dōngfāng Bàoyè Jítuán Yǒuxiàn Gōngsī).

== Changes to day of publication ==
East Touch was published every Tuesday for its first 303 issues. The day of publication changed to Sunday with the 304th issue. It was then, for a brief period from the 348th issue to the 354th issue, released on Wednesdays. It has again been issued on Tuesdays from the 355th issue to date.

== Reputation ==
Cathay Pacific Airways has chosen East Touch to be one of their in-flight magazines.

== See also ==
- Media in Hong Kong
