= Ma Sik-yu =

- Born: Chiu Chow, Guangdong, China
- Died: 1998; Taiwan
- Citizenship: British Hong Kong

Chinese name
- Traditional Chinese: 馬惜如
- Simplified Chinese: 马惜如
Transcriptions
Standard Mandarin
- Hanyu Pinyin: Mǎ Xī-rú
Yue: Cantonese
- Jyutping: Maa5 Sik1-jyu4

Ma Sik-yu (traditional Chinese: 馬惜如; simplified Chinese: 马惜如; pinyin: Mǎ Xī-rú; Jyutping: Maa5 Sik1-jyu4, died 1998) was a Hong Kong businessman and, along with his brother Ma Sik-chun, co-founder of the Oriental Daily News.

== Biography ==
Ma Sik-yu and his younger brother Ma Sik-chun came from Chiu Chow, Guangdong. They eventually relocated to Hong Kong.

The Ma brothers became associates of Ng Shek-ho, a major drug trafficker in Hong Kong. Ma Sik-yu was nicknamed "White Powder Ma". It was alleged that the Ma brothers began trafficking heroin from 1967 onward. They were able to procure heroin by having Ma Sik-yu personally traveled to the Golden Triangle in Burma, along with forging a political alliance with Laos general Ouane Rattikone. Ma Sik-yu was also involved in the activities of Chiu Chow triads in Thailand.

The brothers founded the Oriental Daily News in 1969.

In 1977, warrants were issued for the arrest of the brothers for the importation of 700 tonnes of opium into Hong Kong between 1968 and 1974. Ma Sik-yu, after being tipped off about the police, escaped to Taiwan, where there was no extradition treaty with Hong Kong. His brother followed one year later.

He died in Taiwan in 1998.

== Legacy ==
Oriental Daily News was run by Ma Sik-chun's son Ricky Ma Ching-fat.

In 2010, Oriental Press sued the companies behind five websites, including Wikipedia, for publishing allegedly defamatory statements. The complaints were mainly about the drug trafficking history of its founder, the Ma brothers, found on the Chinese Wikipedia. The Wikimedia Foundation, as a company registered in California, had ignored the court summons and was absent from the trial. The Oriental Press Group therefore received a favorable ruling on paper, including damage claim and an injunction order in August 2010. The articles remained on Chinese Wikipedia.

== In popular culture ==
- Lee Rock : 1991 film, Character Big Brother Ma, portrayed by Chun Wong.
- Legend of the Brothers : 1991 film, Character Hoi, portrayed by Kent Cheng.
- The Prince of Temple Street : 1992 film, portrayed by Kent Cheng.
