= Once Upon a Time in Hong Kong =

Once Upon a Time in Hong Kong may refer to:

- Once Upon a Time in Hong Kong (2021 film), a 2021 film co-directed by Wong Jing and Woody Hui
- The Goldfinger (2023 film), a 2023 film developed under the title Once Upon a Time in Hong Kong
