= Eastern Express (newspaper) =

Defunct Hong Kong newspaper

- Type: Daily newspaper
- Format: Broadsheet
- Owner: Oriental Press Group Limited
- Language: English
- Headquarters: Kowloon Bay
- City: Hong Kong
- Circulation: 10-30,000
- Sister newspapers: Oriental Daily News (in Chinese)

The Eastern Express (Chinese: 東快訊) was an English-language newspaper published in Hong Kong between February 1994 and June 1996 by the Oriental Press Group, which also run the Chinese-language Oriental Daily News.

== Background ==
In the early 1990s, the Hong Kong English-language newspaper market was dominated by the South China Morning Post and the Hongkong Standard, a distant second, both of which were seen to have begun to favour the Chinese Communist Party line on Hong Kong in the remaining few years before the handover of sovereignty in 1997. The Express was established with a mission to stop this tide of "strangulation" and the hope of securing a piece of the highly lucrative franchise of the Post.

== Beginnings ==
Facing saturation in the Chinese-language newspaper business and hearing of a management shake-up at the Post, the chairman of the Oriental Press Group, Ma Ching-kwan, saw an opportunity to slot a new English daily into the print capacity of their HK$200 million facility built in 1990. Ma recruited former Guardian bureau chief Stephen Vines as its first chief editor, and two dozen reporters from the Post, the Hongkong Standard and the Far Eastern Economic Review (FEER). Like Vines, many were veterans brought in on high salaries. The first edition was published on 1 February 1994.

=== Ulterior motive ===
Chief Editor Stephen Vines insisted the paper's before-launch interaction with Michael Hanson, the head of political public relations of Governor Chris Patten, came with the intention of "hope to gain the same support from the administration as the SCMP has enjoyed in the past".

It has been controversially suggested that the newspaper was established by Ma as part of a broader scheme of currying favour with the British Conservative Party and then Governor Chris Patten so as to head off narcotics trafficking allegations made against his two fugitive uncles, founders of the Oriental Press Group, one of whom was then resident in Taiwan.

== Stiff competition ==
After nine months, the paper was struggling with sparse advertising and management upheaval. Vines had left and there was an ongoing search for a replacement. Circulation was languishing at somewhere around a sixth of the market leader, the Post. In the ensuing 19 months, a procession of five more chief editors ran the paper for Oriental.

== Demise ==
Having run up accumulated losses of HK$150 million, and just eight weeks after a last-ditch revamp, the paper closed abruptly on 29 June 1996, throwing about 65 editorial and production staff out of work. In a seemingly related development, Ma Ching-kwan lost his chairmanship of the holding company to his brother Ma Ching-fat with effect from 1 July 1996.
