= Super Bodyguard =

- Poster
- Chinese: 超级保镖
- Directed by: Yue Song
- Starring: Yue Song
- Production companies: Beijing Yuesong Entertainment; Heng Ye Film Distribution; Beijing Hairun Pictures; Beijing Fanya Vision Media
- Distributed by: Heng Ye Film Distribution; Beijing Dingfengchuanqi Media
- Release date: 15 July 2016
- Running time: 90 minutes
- Country: China
- Language: Mandarin
- Box office: CN¥5.4 million

Super Bodyguard, also known as The Bodyguard Chao ji bao biao, is a 2016 Chinese action drama film directed by Yue Song and also starring Yue Song. It was released in China on 15 July 2016.

== Plot ==
Wu-Lin chooses the dark path to seek for revenge, and take the law in his own hands. Wu-Lin is not just a regular man from the rural village, he is also the Successor of an ancient, once powerful Chinese clan, the "Iron Feet". After the death of the clan master, Wu-Lin left the village and come to the City of Stone-cold to look for his fellow apprentice Jiang Li. He turn out become the bodyguard of Fei-Fei, the daughter of Jia-Shan Li, the richest family in the city. A clash of an unruly rich girl with a rugged and masculine bodyguard, sparks the flame of true love. Wu-Lin soon discovered that a group of mobster led by Jiang Li, attempts to kidnap Fei-Fei. To protect his love one, Wu-Lin forced to fight them alone. Brutally crushed, but Wu-Lin managed to survive, he took off his iron-shoes, and feel the adrenaline rush into his body again. Wu-Lin decided to face the group of mobsters once more, and he knows someone much bigger, stronger than Jiang Li is behind the evil plot.

== Cast ==
- Yue Song
- ihsan
- Li Yufei
- Collin Chou
- Michael Chan
- Shang Tielong
- Xu Dongmei
- Yang Jun
- Li Changhai
- Jiang Baocheng
- Yuan Wu
- Dong Jiangtao

== Reception ==
The film grossed CN¥5.4 million at the Chinese box office.
