= Chasing the Dragon (film) =

2017 Hong Kong film by Wong Jing and Jason Kwan

- Theatrical release poster

Chinese name
- Traditional Chinese: 追龍
- Simplified Chinese: 追龙
Transcriptions
Standard Mandarin
- Hanyu Pinyin: Zhuī Lóng
- Directed by: Wong Jing; Jason Kwan
- Screenplay by: Wong Jing; Philip Lui; Howard Yip
- Produced by: Wong Jing; Donnie Yen; Andy Lau; Connie Wong
- Starring: Donnie Yen; Andy Lau
- Cinematography: Jason Kwan
- Edited by: Li Ka-wing
- Music by: Chan Kwong-wing; Patrick Lui
- Production companies: Mega-Vision Project Workshop; Bona Film Group; Infinitus Entertainment; Super Bullet
- Distributed by: Mega-Vision Project Workshop Limited
- Release dates: September 28, 2017 (Hong Kong); September 30, 2017 (China)
- Running time: 128 minutes
- Country: Hong Kong
- Languages: Cantonese; Mandarin; Teochew; English; Thai
- Budget: CN¥200 million
- Box office: US$87.9 million

Chasing the Dragon (Chinese: 追龍; Sidney Lau: Jui^{1} Lung^{4}), previously known as King of Drug Dealers, is a 2017 Hong Kong action crime drama film directed by Wong Jing and Jason Kwan. The film stars Donnie Yen as Crippled Ho, based on real life gangster Ng Sik-ho and Andy Lau reprising his role as Lee Rock from the film series of the same name. The film is about an illegal immigrant from China who sneaks into British-colonized Hong Kong in 1963 and transforms himself into a ruthless and emerging drug lord. The film is a remake of the 1991 film To Be Number One.

Chasing the Dragon II: Wild Wild Bunch, a standalone sequel new characters and a new storyline, was released in June 2019.

== Cast ==
- Donnie Yen as Crippled Ho (跛豪; based on Ng Sik-ho)
- Andy Lau (special appearance) as Lee Rock (雷洛; based on Lui Lok)
- Bryan Larkin as Ernest Hunter, a corrupt British Superintendent of Police and the main antagonist of the film
- Kent Cheng as Piggy
- Philip Keung as Wil
- Wilfred Lau as Wayne
- Yu Kang as Chad
- Kent Tong as Tong
- Michelle Hu as Jane
- Raquel Xu as Rose
- Felix Wong as Jan
- Ben Ng as Chubby
- Julian Gaertner as Translator Geoff, the right hand of Ernest Hunter
- Niki Chow as May, Ho's deceased wife
- Philip Ng as Wai Man
- Jonathan Lee as Peter
- Lawrence Chou as Willy
- Wang Qianyu as Cheryl
- Kenneth Tsang as Sir Chow
- Michael Chan as Master Dane
- Ricky Wong as Grizzly Bear
- Xia Qing as Grizzly Bear's wife
- Han Xinyi as Snake Dancer
- Terence Yin as Tong's brother
- Jason Wong as Comic

== Production and release ==
Director Wong Jing personally flew to Canada in 2016 to persuade Yen to star in Chasing the Dragon while Yen was filming XXX: Return of Xander Cage at the time. Yen was convinced by Wong's sincerity to play a non-traditional role of a villain with limited fighting scenes and the opportunity to work alongside Andy Lau. Yen flew back to Asia to take part in the film after filming Return of Xander Cage in 2016.

In September 2017, Chasing the Dragon was released to mixed reviews from critics. It was a huge hit with audiences in most Mandarin-speaking parts of Asia (including China and Singapore), beating Hollywood blockbuster Blade Runner 2049 and Jackie Chan's The Foreigner, despite being marketed less heavily. In Hong Kong, Chasing the Dragon earned more than 10 times the box office gross of The Foreigner. In China, it earned US$86 million.

Chasing the Dragon was released as a digital, Blu-ray and DVD combo pack on January 23, 2018.

== Awards and nominations ==
Award	Category	Recipients	Result
37th Hong Kong Film Awards	Best Film	Wong Jing, Donnie Yen, Andy Lau, Connie Wong	Nominated
37th Hong Kong Film Awards	Best Cinematography	Jason Kwan	Won
37th Hong Kong Film Awards	Best Film Editing	Li Ka-wing	Won
37th Hong Kong Film Awards	Best Art Direction	James Cheung	Nominated
37th Hong Kong Film Awards	Best Costume & Make Up Design	Yee Chung-man, Bruce Yu, Kwok Suk-man	Nominated
37th Hong Kong Film Awards	Best Action Choreography	Yu Kang, Yuen Bun, Yan Hua	Nominated
