= Michael Hanson =

Hong Kong press secretary

Michael "Mike" Hanson (born c. 1930s–1940s, Chinese: 韓新) is a Hong Kong press secretary, mostly remembered as the spin doctor and the head of Governor Chris Patten's war room from 1992 to 1994. He was responsible for promoting Patten's controversial 1994 Hong Kong electoral reform, which became a political storm that eventually hampered a smooth handover of Hong Kong to China. Hanson is also remembered by the public and the media for being the first official to introduce political PR into the government and for being the government's refugee co-ordinator of Vietnamese asylum seekers in Hong Kong.

Hanson was the head of political public relations (Note: The position is officially known as "Information Co-ordinator" (in Chinese, formerly known as 資訊統籌專員, later known as 新聞統籌專員).) of the British Hong Kong government (1991 - October 1994). In addition, he took the role as the personal press secretary of Chris Patten (1992 - October 1994), the last Governor of British Hong Kong.

== Early career in British civil service ==
Hanson born in a working-class background of a northern English coal-mining family. Hanson joined Her Majesty's Civil Service in 1974 serving in HM Customs and Excise, the parliamentary commissioner's office and on secondment, via the Foreign and Commonwealth Office, to the British Hong Kong Government. He was sent to Hong Kong from the 1980s to the 1990s. After returning to the UK Hanson became director general, benefits and credits at HM Revenue & Customs.

== Political PR in Hong Kong government ==
In British Hong Kong, Hanson held the roles of head of government property agency, refugee co-ordinator (handling the Vietnamese boat people between 1989 – 1991), information co-ordinator (1991 - October 1994) and personal press secretary (July 1992 - October 1994) of Chris Patten, the last Governor of Hong Kong.

His posting to information co-ordinator came in the wake of September 1991 Hong Kong legislative election, the first ever direct election held. The British Hong Kong government recognized a political PR is needed to respond to the new heavily-mandated Legislative Council. During his tenure, the Information Co-ordinator's Office developed a firm grip of the Secretariat Press Office, a division of the Government Information Services (GIS) responsible for press statements. The GIS is traditionally a neutral bureaucratic news service. Hanson's political PR approach of handling governor's publicity is first of its kind in Hong Kong, though reflected well in public, it created a tension with GIS, headed by career bureaucrat Irene Yau Lee Che-yun. His revolutionized approach of bringing political PR into his position set a precedent. After handover of Hong Kong to China, Hong Kong mayors kept it as a permanent political PR position.

=== 1994 electoral reform ===
When Chris Patten took governorship in July 1992, Hanson became his personal press secretary in addition to his role as the information co-ordinator. He is described as the spin doctor and the head of war room for promoting Chris Patten's his flagship and controversial 1994 Hong Kong electoral reform, which was welcomed by pro-democracy legislators while heavily criticized by the diplomat-sinologists of the U.K. Foreign Office and the Hong Kong pro-Beijing camp (politicians, tycoons and media) for breaching the Seven Hurd-Qian letters between the two nations' foreign ministers in 1990 and derailing the handover of Hong Kong to China set in 1997. In the end, he secured a narrow passage of the bill after surviving Allen Lee's hostile amendment by one vote, 29 to 28 votes. He left both roles in October 1994, with Kevin McGlynn being his successor.

Hanson is also involved in the launching of Eastern Express newspaper in 1994, which has been suggested as leaning to Conservative Party.

== After leaving civil service ==
- Advisory partner, PricewaterhouseCoopers LLP, June 2009. Approved by ACOBA.
- Advisor, Mace Group, January 2010. Given "unconditional approval" by ACOBA. From 2014, he becomes the CEO of Mace Foundation.
