= Crimson Street =

1982 Hong Kong film by Johnny Mak

- Film poster
- Directed by: David Lai
- Written by: John Au
- Produced by: Johnny Mak
- Starring: Sally Yeh; Kenny Bee; Wai-Man Chan; James Barnett; Mang-Ha Cheng; Mei-King Leung; Steve Mak; Sam Sorono; Kai-Keung Sze; Wai Tam; Melvin Wong
- Cinematography: Arthur Wong
- Edited by: Fan Kung-Wing
- Music by: Chris Babida
- Production companies: Yiu Wing Movie Enterprise Co., Ltd. Johnny Mak Production
- Release date: 18 November 1982
- Running time: 90 minutes
- Country: Hong Kong
- Language: Cantonese
- Box office: HK $4,069,835

Crimson Street (pinyin: Sha ren ai qing jie) is a film directed by David Lai and produced by Johnny Mak. Released in 1982, it is a story about a night club singer involved in a love triangle with three men. The lead role is played by Sally Yeh. It also stars Kenny Bee, Wai-Man Chan and Melvin Wong.

== Story ==
The film combines action, comedy and romance to add to the story of Sally, a night club singer who is romantically involved with three men. One of them is Stone (played by Kenny Bee), a bank robber who has recently been released from prison. Another man she is involved with is a night club owner Paul King (played by Chan Wai-Man). The third man in the 4 player love-tangle is a policeman called Pow (played by Melvin Wong).

== Background ==
For his part in the film, Chan Wai-Man was a 2nd Annual Hong Kong Film Awards best actor nominee. The film boosted the star profile of Sally Yeh.

== Cast ==
- Sally Yeh as Sally
- Kenny Bee as Stone
- Michael Chan as Paul King
- Melvin Wong as Pow
- Leung Mei-King as Fatty's girl
- James Barrett as Mr. Cook
- Cheng Mang-Ha as Stone's mom
- Steve Mak as Cop
- Kwong Chan-Chau (Mr. X) as Monkow
- Sze Kai-Keung as Fatty
- Sam Sorono as Thug
- Tam Wai as Thug
- Chan Ling-Wai as Waiter
- Woh Seung as Waiter
- Wong Yat-Fei as Fortune teller
- San Sin as Kidnapper
- Chan Leung as Kidnapper
