= Corruption in Hong Kong =

Despite ranking high in Transparency International’s Corruption Perception Index for 2023, Corruption in Hong Kong remains a serious problem. Two of the most prominent corruption issues are transparency and accountability, which both affect the city’s socio-economic development.

== Anti-corruption measures ==
The landmark anti-corruption mechanism that serves as the foundation of Hong Kong’s success in addressing corruption is the Independent Commission Against Corruption, which was established on February 15, 1974. It was created as an independent disciplined force and law enforcement agency directly under the governor of Hong Kong. Since its inception it has been pivotal in the reduction of corruption both on the public and private levels. Its achievements include the case against Peter Godber, a senior police officer who amassed HK $4.3 million of assets from corruption during his 20 years of government service. He fled the city amid investigation, forcing the Hong Kong government to take action. Gober was extradited in 1975 from England to stand trial.

There is also the elimination of the culture of bribery, which assumed the forms of “tea money”, “black money”, and “hell money”, among others. These were given to earn a living or access basic services. For instance, ambulance crews must be paid tea money in order to pick up a patient. It was also revealed that there was a widespread practice of accepting tea money in the Customs and Excise Department from traders to facilitate customs clearance. This problem was addressed through a string of investigations that led to several arrests and reforms within the department. ICAC also implemented stringent enforcement of the Prevention of Bribery Ordinance, which helped in significantly reducing corrupt practices.

== Modern challenges ==
The anti-corruption efforts of ICAC have served as a model for anti-corruption agencies in other countries due to a combination of robust legal framework, political support, and continuous public engagement. Despite reforms and anti-corruption measures, however, there are still challenges that persist in Hong Kong today. For instance, there is an inability on the part of ICAC to address new forms of corruption. This is demonstrated in the case of cryptocurrency. In 2023, for instance, the JPEX scandal broke, with reports of police investigating allegations of fraud stemming from complaints filed by 2,000 victims. JPEX is a Dubai-based cryptocurrency trading platform and it tapped local influencers to lure inexperienced investors to purchase cryptocurrencies, promising high yields, which it was unable to provide. As Hong Kong tries to establish itself as a financial hub using next generation internet technologies, digital economy experts note that existing laws may not be enough to prevent illegal operation of virtual asset platforms and to protect investors from fraud and losses.

The capacity of Hong Kong’s anti-corruption reform to maintain public support has also been challenged by several high-profile corruption cases. An example is the case of former Chief Executive Donald Tsang, who was convicted of misconduct during his term. ICAC had to navigate its role without the perception that the agency is politically biased. This problem is further highlighted by a study that found the lingering prospect of political interference representing a significant future challenge for the agency.
