= Ma Sik-chun =

Hong Kong businessman (1938–2015)

- Born: 1938; Chiu Chow, Guangdong, China
- Died: June 15, 2015 (aged 77); Taipei City, Taiwan
- Citizenship: British Hong Kong

Chinese name
- Traditional Chinese: 馬惜珍
- Simplified Chinese: 马惜珍
Transcriptions
Standard Mandarin
- Hanyu Pinyin: Mǎ Xī-zhēn
Yue: Cantonese
- Jyutping: Maa5 Sik1-zan1

Ma Sik-chun (traditional Chinese: 馬惜珍; simplified Chinese: 马惜珍; pinyin: Mǎ Xī-zhēn; Jyutping: Maa5 Sik1-zan1, 1938 – 15 June 2015) was a Hong Kong businessman, media mogul and, along with his brother Ma Sik-yu, co-founder of the Oriental Daily News.

== Biography ==
Ma Sik-chun and his older brother Ma Sik-yu came from Chiu Chow, Guangdong. They eventually relocated to Hong Kong.

The Ma brothers became associates of Ng Shek-ho, a major drug trafficker in Hong Kong. It was alleged that the Ma brothers began trafficking heroin from 1967 onward, with Ma Sik-chun earning the nickname "Golden Ma". At the time, Ma Sik-chun was in charge of street gangs and distribution. For their procurement of heroin, the Ma brothers aligned themselves with Laos general Ouane Rattikone. Ma Sik-chun was considered one of the biggest drug lords in Asia.

The brothers founded the Oriental Daily News in 1969.

In 1977, warrants were issued for the arrest of the brothers for the importation of 700 tonnes of opium into Hong Kong between 1968 and 1974. Ma Sik-chun's brother, Ma Sik-yu escaped to Taiwan, where there was no extradition treaty with Hong Kong. Ma Sik-chun stayed in Hong Kong, and was charged in August 1977. He was granted bail of HK$500,000 cash plus two sureties totaling HK$1 million. He escaped bail and was smuggled to Taiwan in 1978. A further warrant for his arrest was issued on September 25, 1978. On arrival in Taiwan, he was arrested for illegal entry but was freed one year later.

The ownership of Oriental Daily News passed to his son Ma Ching-kwan. In 1998, the British Conservative Party was caught in a political scandal after it was revealed that Ma Ching-kwan donated £1 million to the party in 1994. The scandal surfaced after Ma Ching-kwan demanded the donation back, and receipt of the donation, along with a picture of Prime Minister John Major meeting Ma Ching-kwan at 10 Downing Street, was published on the paper. Accounts emerged that the donation was made with the condition of the safe return of Ma Sik-chun to Hong Kong. The Conservative Party did not deny the donation, but denied that any conditions were attached. William Hague, then leader of the Conservative Party, agreed to hand the money back on the basis that it was foreign money.

In 2010, Oriental Press sued the companies behind five websites, including Wikipedia, for publishing allegedly defamatory statements. The complaints were mainly about the drug trafficking history of its founder, the Ma brothers, found on the Chinese Wikipedia. The Wikimedia Foundation, as a company registered in California, had ignored the court summon and was absent from the trial. The Oriental Press Group therefore received a favorable ruling on paper, including damage claim and an injunction order in August 2010. The articles remained on Chinese Wikipedia.

Multiple attempts to return Ma Sik-chun was made before his death, including one in 2014 where his lawyer claimed that it is his "dying wish" to return to Hong Kong, and that jumping bail was not an offence in Hong Kong until 1994.

He died at the Taipei Veterans General Hospital in Taiwan at age 77.

== In popular culture ==
- Lee Rock : 1991 film, Character Little Brother Ma, portrayed by Jamie Luk.
- Legend of the Brothers : 1991 film, Character Ho, portrayed by Ray Lui.
- The Prince of Temple Street : 1992 film, Character Little Ma, portrayed by Jamie Luk.
