= I Corrupt All Cops =

2009 Hong Kong film by Wong Jing

- Film poster
- Directed by: Wong Jing
- Written by: Wong Jing
- Produced by: Cheung Hong Tat; Wong Jing; Zhang Hao
- Starring: Tony Leung Ka-fai; Anthony Wong; Eason Chan; Bowie Lam
- Cinematography: Keung Kwok Man; Ng King Man
- Edited by: Li Kar Wing
- Music by: Raymond Wong
- Production companies: Mega-Vision Pictures (MVP); Sil-Metropole Organisation; Beijing Poly-bona Film Publishing Company
- Distributed by: Mega-Vision Pictures (MVP)
- Release date: 30 April 2009
- Running time: 107 minutes
- Country: Hong Kong
- Language: Cantonese

I Corrupt All Cops (simplified Chinese: 金钱帝国; traditional Chinese: 金錢帝國) is a 2009 Hong Kong crime drama film directed by Wong Jing. The English initials of the film spells out ICAC.

== Plot ==
During the time Hong Kong was under British rule, there was a dark age when corruption and bribery were the order of the day. Chinese Chief Sergeant Lak (Tony Leung Ka-fai) together with his gang, Unicorn (Anthony Wong), Gale (Eason Chan) and Gold (Wong Jing) laundered massive sums thereby making Hong Kong an empire of graft. Whenever they failed to apprehend the felons, Unicorn would get innocent victims, like Bong (Alex Fong), to admit to the crimes.

Gale had nine "wives", all of whom were actually mistresses of other constables. Only Lily (Kate Tsui) was loyal to him, but Gale was fascinated by the female drug lord, Rose (Liu Yang). Lak was found having an affair with Unicorn's mistress (Natalie Meng Yao). Unicorn beat up Lak and was demoted to stand guard at a reservoir.

In the early 1970s, the Governor of Hong Kong decided to clean up the police force. The ICAC was established, whose operation branch was headed by Yim (Bowie Lam). Bong and Unicorn also joined the ICAC. Despite threats of violence and intimidation, they managed to bring about the downfall of the empire of graft.

== Cast ==
- Tony Leung Ka-fai - Chief Sergeant Lak Chui
- Anthony Wong - Unicorn Tang, ex police officer and ICAC Sergeant
- Eason Chan - Senior Corporal, Gale Chan
- Bowie Lam - ICAC Head of Operation, Inspector Yim
- Alex Fong - Bong, ICAC Corporal
- Wong Jing - Gold, Lak Chui's money collector
- Kate Tsui - Lily
- Kong Lin - Lak Chui's wife
- Alan Chui Chung-San - Limp
- Mars - Det. Sgt Major at meeting
- Johnny Cheung - Det. Sgt Major at meeting
- Natalie Meng Yao - Unicorn's mistress
- Liu Yang - Rose, female drug lord
- Paw Hee-Ching - Bong's mother
- Timmy Hung - Pastry, policeman
- Samuel Leung - Fai
- Simon Waikiss - Donald

== Release ==
It was released in Hong Kong theaters on 30 April 2009. The U.S. DVD edition was released on 13 November 2009. Special features included are trailers, making of, and deleted scenes.
