= Michael Chan (actor) =

Hong Kong actor

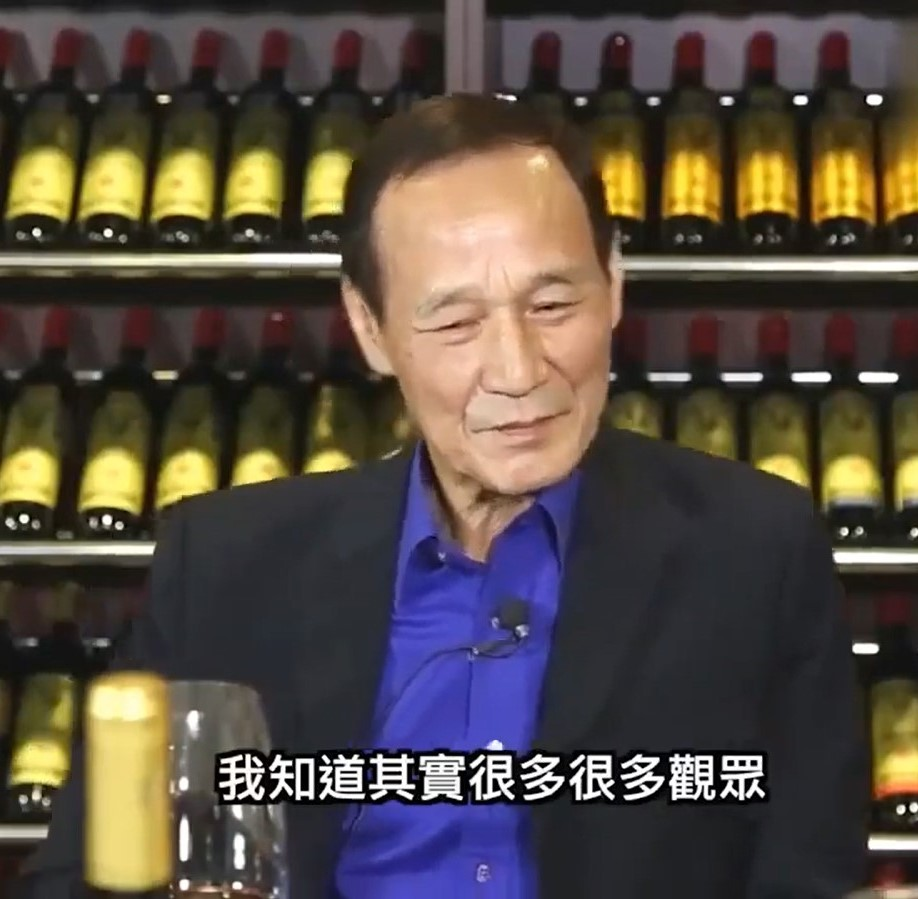
Chan in an interview in 2019

Michael Chan Wai-man (Chinese: 陳惠敏; born 10 July 1943) is a Hong Kong actor and martial artist. A Hakka of Wuhua ancestry born in New Territories, Chan was well known for various triad roles, when in actuality he had been involved with triads in real life. In a media interview, he admitted to have been the No. 2 in the 14K Triad that dominated vice in Tsim Sha Tsui before the handover of Hong Kong. Having worked as a police officer in the prison system, he came into contact with many underworld figures and joined the Triads. Chan was expelled from the Royal Hong Kong Police as a result of his links.

== Personal life ==
In his twenties, Chan met his partner Ng Kwok-ying (吳國英), and together they have had three children. The couple married in 2020 after being together for 50 years.

== Filmography ==
=== Films ===
- The Way of the Bug (2018)
- Chasing the Dragon (2017)
- Muay Thai Girls (2016)
- Super Bodyguard (2016)
- Gangster Payday (2014)
- Triad (2012)
- Lives in Flames (2012)
- Gallants (2010)
- Run Papa Run (2008)
- A Chinese Tall Story (2005)
- Where's Mamma's Boy? (2005)
- 6 A.M. (2005)
- Enter The Phoenix (2004)
- Yellow Dragon (2003)
- Lost in Time (2003)
- The Spy Dad (2003)
- Bullets of Love (2001)
- Old Master Q 2001 (2001)
- You Shoot, I Shoot (2001)
- Mafia Dot Com (2000)
- Metade Fumaca (2000)
- The Kingdom of Mob (1999)
- Heaven of Hope (1999)
- Deadly Illusion (1998)
- A True Mob Story (1998)
- Young And Dangerous: The Prequel (1998)
- We're No Bad Guys (1997)
- Beyond the Copline (1996)
- Mongkok Story (1996)
- Once Upon a Time in Triad Society (1996)
- To Be No.1 (1996)
- Young and Dangerous 3 (1996)
- Mr. X (1995)
- Teddy Boy (1995)
- Hong Kong Adam's Family (1994)
- Lady Super Cops (1993)
- The Mad Monk (1993)
- No More Love, No More Death (1993)
- The Wild Girls (1993)
- All Mighty Gambler (1993)
- Truant Heroes (1992)
- Once a Black Sheep (1992)
- Heroes of Earth (1992)
- Gun n' Rose (1992)
- What a Hero! (1992)
- Talk to Me Dicky (1992)
- Lee Rock II (1991)
- Lee Rock (1991)
- Gangland Odyssey (1990)
- Bloody Brotherhood (1989)
- Project A Part II (1987)
- In The Line of Duty (1986)
- Pom Pom Strikes Back (1986)
- Legacy of Rage (1986)
- Ninja Strike (1985)
- The Master Strikes Back (1985)
- Profile in Anger (1984)
- Three Stooges Go Undercover (1984)
- Five Element Ninjas (1982)
- Winner Takes All (1982)
- Crimson Street (1982)
- Mercenaries from Hong Kong (1982)
- Dragon Lord (1982)
- The Legal Illegals (1981)
- The Mad Cold-Blooded Murder (1981)
- The Club (1981)
- The Heroes (1980)
- Handcuffs (1979)
- The Deadly Breaking Sword (1979)
- The Proud Youth (1978)
- Godfather's Fury (1978)
- The Mad, The Mean and the Deadly (1978)
- Bruce Lee, The Invincible (1978)
- The Invincible Killer (1978)
- Judgment of an Assassin (1977)
- Broken Oath (1977)
- Deadly Chase For Justice (1977)
- Ferocious Monk from Shaolin (1977)
- The Big Boss Part 2 (1976)
- Bruce's Deadly Fingers (1976)
- Jumping Ash (1976)
- All Men Are Brothers (1975)
- The Female Fugitive (1975)
- Chinese Mack (1974)
- The Bravest Fist (1974)
- Chinese Hercules (1973)
- Spirits of Bruce Lee (1973)
- Adventure in Denmark (1973)
- Tiger Vs Dragon (1972)
- Love And Blood (1972)
- Black List (1972)
- Black Dragon Fighters(1988)

=== TV series ===
- The Legend of the Condor Heroes (1976)
- The Return of the Condor Heroes (1976)
- OCTB (2017)
