= Once Upon a Time in Hong Kong (2021 film) =

2021 Hong Kong film by Wong Jing and Woody Hui

- Official film poster

Chinese name
- Traditional Chinese: 金錢帝國：追虎擒龍
- Simplified Chinese: 金钱帝国：追虎擒龙
Transcriptions
Standard Mandarin
- Hanyu Pinyin: Jīn Qián Dì Guó: Zhuī Hǔ Qín Lóng
Yue: Cantonese
- Jyutping: Gam1 Cin4 Dai3 Gwok3: Zeoi1 Fu2 Kam4 Lung4
- Directed by: Wong Jing; Woody Hui
- Screenplay by: Wong Jing; Ronald Chan; Lui Koon Nam; Stanley Hui
- Produced by: Wong Jing; Stanley Tong; Connie Wong
- Starring: Louis Koo; Tony Leung; Francis Ng; Gordon Lam
- Cinematography: Andy Ng
- Edited by: Li Ka-wing
- Music by: Lowell Lo
- Production companies: Mega-Vision Pictures; Erdong Pictures (Beijing); Moke Pictures (Beijing); Tianjin Maoyan Weiying Culture Media; Emperor Film Production; Beijing Yuanshang Culture Media; Shanghai Zhongyan Culture Media; Nanjing Jiangshance Films; World Universal Culture; Ili Changjiang Culture; Beijing Carrie Yamei Film & TV Media; Bliss Media; Hengnuo Family Office (Guangzhou); Perfect Sky Pictures; Shanghai Gonggong Film & TV Culture; Horgos Huanxing Entertainment Company Limited; Film Power Entertainment; Flaming Time Broadcast Organization
- Distributed by: Mega-Vision Pictures
- Release dates: 29 April 2021 (Hong Kong, Singapore, Malaysia); 1 May 2021 (China)
- Running time: 106 minutes
- Countries: Hong Kong; China
- Language: Cantonese
- Budget: CN¥330 million
- Box office: US$40.62 million (Note: See Box office)

Once Upon a Time in Hong Kong (Chinese: 金錢帝國：追虎擒龍), previously known as Money Empire (Chinese: 金錢帝國：巔峰之戰) and I Corrupt All Cops 2 (Chinese: 金錢帝國2：四大探長) is a 2021 Hong Kong action crime film directed by Wong Jing and Woody Hui, and starring Louis Koo, Tony Leung, Francis Ng and Gordon Lam. The film is a thematic sequel to the 2009 film I Corrupt All Cops, featuring a new storyline. Koo and Lam play ICAC investigators who battle against notorious drug lord Crippled Ho (Leung) and corrupt police detective Chui Lok (Ng). The film was released on 29 April 2021.

== Plot ==
During the 1970s in Hong Kong, corruption has become endemic in the city, with police corruption being the leading culprit. As the kings of the corruption empire, chief Chinese detective Chui Lok (Francis Ng) and triad leader/drug lord Crippled Ho (Tony Leung Ka-fai) have colluded for over ten years and amassed over a trillion dollars.

Lawyer Hank Chan (Louis Koo) has always despised corruption and believes that if citizens fall into poverty, their rights and privileges would be exploited. By chance, Chan reunites with his college classmate Nash Pak (Gordon Lam), who returned from Britain. Pak is impressed by Chan's righteous personality and invites him to join the governor's newly established Independent Commission Against Corruption.

Chan and Pak select a group of elites to be the ICAC's first batch of investigators, with their main targets being Ho and Tsui. The ICAC'S early missions are successful but Ho and Tsui team up to retaliate and threaten many of the investigators. Nonetheless, Chan and Pak's will remain untouched and they become more determined to eliminate the two corrupt tyrants.

== Cast ==
- Louis Koo as Hank Chan (陳克), a former lawyer who becomes a chief investigator of Independent Commission Against Corruption of Hong Kong (ICAC) after being recruited by his old classmate and friend Nash Pak.
- Tony Leung Ka-fai as Crippled Ho (跛豪), Hong Kong's number one drug lord.
- Francis Ng as Chui Lok (徐樂), the corrupt Chief Chinese Detective of the Royal Hong Kong Police Force.
- Gordon Lam as Nash Pak (白松安), chief inspector of the ICAC and Chan's old classmate and friend who recruited the latter to join the organization.
- Philip Keung as Elon (依勞七), a gambling-addicted police officer who was dismissed and beaten by Chui and was recruited by Chan and Pak to join the ICAC.
- Michelle Hu as Yanni Chui (崔瑩恩), Chan's fiance who is a journalist.
- Kent Cheng as Pudgy (豬油仔), Chui's right-hand man.
- Jacky Cai as Sharon Lam (林善怡), an ICAC investigator.
- Lam Tsz-sin as Timmy Hui (許大天), Pudgy's former underling who becomes an ICAC investigator.
- Mimi Kung as Pudgy's wife.
- Wilfred Lau as Wil (細威), Ho's top henchman.
- Dominic Ho as Ron Ho (何國勇), an ICAC investigator.
- Raymond Wong as Ho Ching (何正), Chan and Pak's old friend who is a marine police officer.
- Eric Li as Wayne (大威), Ho's top henchman and Wil's older brother.
- Parkman Wong as Jan Tse (謝淦生), a corrupt police officer and Chui's underling who was caught red-handed with cocaine shipments and was persuaded by Chan to testify against Chui.
- Wan Yeung-ming as Comic (公仔強), a triad leader who is Ho's friend.
- Chang Yuci as Leia Yung (容海麗), an ICAC investigator.
- Ricky Wong as Jackson (強雄), a rival triad leader of Hon who was stabbed by Wil and arrested by the police.
- Derek Kok as Victor (花仔榮), a drug dealer whom Chui plans to groom to take Ho's position.
- Yu Kang as Joker (潮州祝), Ho's underling.
- Michael Joseph Rosenthal as Sir Jack Cater (姬達)
- Vincent Matile as Peter Godber (葛柏)

== Production ==
Principal photography for Once Upon a Time in Hong Kong began on 28 August 2019 where a production commencement ceremony was held with director Wong Jing and stars Louis Koo and Gordon Lam present. After two months of compact, intensive filming, production for Once Upon a Time in Hong Kong officially wrapped up on 31 October 2019.

== Reception ==
=== Box office ===
As of 23 May 2021, Once Upon a Time in Hong Kong has grossed a total of US$40.62 million worldwide, combining its gross from Hong Kong (US$520,000) and China (US$40.1 million).

In Hong Kong, the film debuted at No. 2 on its opening weekend, grossing HK$1,867,401 (US$240,412) during its first four days of release. The film remained at No. 2 on its second weekend, grossing HK$1,283,498, and have grossed a total of HK$3,150,899 (US$410,000) by then. During its third weekend, the film grossed HK$670,348, coming in at Nom 5, and have grossed a total of HK$3,821,247 (US$491,941) by then. On its fourth week, the film grossed HK$207,394, coming in at No. 10, and have accumulated a total gross of HK$4,028,641 (US$520,000) so far.

In China, the film debuted at No. 4 on its opening weekend, grossing US$15.1 million on its first two days of release. On its second week, the film grossed US$19.2 million and remained at No. 4, and have grossed a total of US$34.3 million by then. During its third weekend, the film grossed US$4.4 million, coming in at No. 5, and have grossed a total of US$38.7 million by then. On its fourth week, the film grossed US$1.4 million, coming in at No. 10, and have accumulated a total gross of US$40.1 million so far.

=== Critical reception ===
Edmund Lee of the South China Morning Post gave the film a score of 3/5 stars and describes the film as "predictable yet undeniably engaging" while also praising Tony Leung and Francis Ng's understated performances. Lim Lian-yu ofYahoo! Singapore gave the film a similar score of 3/5 stars, noting the film's strong buildup to the climax that is hampered by a weak resolution.
