= Lui Lok =

Hong Kong police officer

Lui Lok CPM
- 呂樂
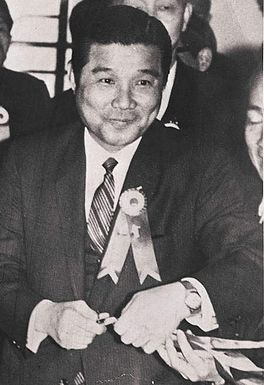
- Lui in 1962
- Born: Lui Mo Lok (呂慕樂); 16 May 1920; Haifeng County, Shanwei, Guangdong, Republic of China
- Died: 13 May 2010 (aged 89); Vancouver, British Columbia, Canada
- Resting place: Forest Lawn Memorial Park, Burnaby, British Columbia, Canada
- Other names: Brother Lok; Tiger Lui; Lee Rock
- Citizenship: Republic of China; Canada
- Occupation: Police detective
- Spouse: Choi Chun
- Children: 1 daughter 7 sons
- Wanted by: ICAC
- Wanted since: 1976
- Escaped: 1973

Details
- Country: Hong Kong
- Police career
- Country: British Hong Kong
- Allegiance: British Government
- Department: Hong Kong Police Force
- Service years: 1940–1968
- Status: Retired
- Rank: DS/SGT I

Chinese name
- Traditional Chinese: 呂樂
- Simplified Chinese: 吕乐
Transcriptions
Standard Mandarin
- Hanyu Pinyin: Lǚ Lè
Yue: Cantonese
- Jyutping: Leoi^{5} Lok^{6}

Birth name
- Traditional Chinese: 呂慕樂
- Simplified Chinese: 吕慕乐
Transcriptions
Standard Mandarin
- Hanyu Pinyin: Lǚ Mùlè
Yue: Cantonese
- Jyutping: Leoi^{5} Mou^{6}-lok^{6}

Lui Lok CPM (Chinese: 呂樂; born Lui Mo Lok, 呂慕樂; 16 May 1920 – 13 May 2010) was a Hong Kong police detective known for his acts of corruption during the 1960s and 1970s. He was wanted by Hong Kong's Independent Commission Against Corruption (ICAC). Although his illegally obtained assets were partially seized by the authorities, legal obstacles prevented his extradition from Taiwan and later Canada, which allowed him to ultimately escape prosecution.

== Biography ==
Lui Mo Lok was born in Haifeng County, Guangdong, and spent his childhood there. Lui immigrated to Cheung Chau before moving to Hong Kong, there he survived as a shoe shiner, a postman and a rickshaw driver before joining the Hong Kong Police Force.

On 9 November 1940, Lui became a police officer in the Hong Kong Police Force. He was later advanced to a detective. While working in the Criminal Investigation Department, he was promoted by Senior Detective Chan Lap, and then CPL, Police Corporal by 1951. That same year, he was transferred to Sham Shui Po Police Station.

In 1955, the gang 14K was one of the four biggest triads in Hong Kong. While 14K was holding a feast in a school located in Diamond Hill, Lui arrested them with his team. As a result, he was promoted to SCPL, Senior Corporal in 1956.

In 1956, the Hong Kong 1956 riots happened. Because of Lui's experience in dealing with the triads, he was arranged in an important position by the administration of the police force. Because of his outstanding work, he was promoted to be the DS/SGT II in New Territories District, stationed in Tsuen Wan Police Station.

In 1958, Lui was transferred to Yau Ma Tei to replace the retired DS/SGT II Lau Fuk. In 1962, the Hong Kong Police Force reset the position of DS/SGT I, and Lui was promoted one of two DS/SGT I positions, Nam Gong was promoted to the other. Lui stationed in Hong Kong Island while Nam was stationed in Kowloon and New Territories.

On 1 April 1962, Lui was awarded the Colonial Police Medal by Queen Elizabeth II on Queen’s Birthday at Hong Kong’s Government House. In 1963, Lui was appointed by Hong Kong Governor Sir Robert Black to a blue ribbon commission to study police reform.

In 1967, Lui and Nam were transferred to other stations by the Police Force in a case of serious corruption. In 1968, Lui took early retirement from the police force.

In 1973, Lui immigrated to Canada with his wife Choi Chun (蔡珍) and eight children. In 1974, the ICAC was founded, and a wanted notice for Lui was issued in 1976, but by then he had settled in Taiwan. He was charged with having assets "disproportionate to and unable to be explained or accounted for by his official emoluments, awards, or allowance'" and many of his assets were frozen by the ICAC. The Hong Kong court recovered part of his assets in 1977, and some of which were later recovered through his estate in 1986. He was unable to be extradited due to the lack of an extradition treaty with Taiwan and legal complications with Hong Kong's treaty with Canada.

In 1979, Lui purchased a luxury apartment in Taipei, Taiwan, where he would reside in low profile for more than 30 years. His daughter became a Taiwanese citizen and was a civil servant, while his seven sons resided in Canada. He died due to gastric cancer on 13 May 2010 in Vancouver, British Columbia, Canada. His funeral was attended by 80 family members and friends at Forest Lawn Memorial Park in Burnaby, where he was buried.

== Honours ==
- United Kingdom
  - Recipient of the Colonial Police Medal (CPM) (1962)

== Depictions in media ==
Lui has been depicted in various films and TV Series due to his notoriety.

- To Be Number One (1991), Character Tiger Lui, portrayed by Kenneth Tsang.
- Legend of the Brothers (1991), Character Lui Kwok Tin, portrayed by Kenneth Tsang.
- Lee Rock (1991), Character Lee Rock, portrayed by Andy Lau.
- Lee Rock II (1991), Character Lee Rock, portrayed by Andy Lau.
- Arrest the Restless (1992), Character Tiger Lui, portrayed by Andy Lau.
- The Prince of Temple Street (1992), Character Lee Rock, portrayed by Andy Lau.
- Powerful Four (1992), Character Lui Kit, portrayed by Simon Yam.
- The Greed of Man (1992), Character Lung Sing-Bond, portrayed by Kenneth Tsang.
- He Ain't Heavy, He's My Father (1993), Character Sgt Rocky, portrayed by Andrew Kam.
- Old Time Buddy: To Catch a Thief (1998), Character Lui King, portrayed by Felix Lok.
- The H.K. Triad (1999), Character Lok, portrayed by Francis Ng.
- I Corrupt All Cops (2009), Character Lak Chui, portrayed by Tony Leung Ka-Fai.
- Chasing the Dragon (2017), Character Lee Rock, portrayed by Andy Lau.
- The One Billion Dollar Inspector (2020), Character Xu Le, portrayed by Vincent Wong.
- Once Upon a Time in Hong Kong (2021), Character Chui Lok, portrayed by Francis Ng.
- Extras for Chasing The Dragon (2023), Character Xu Le, portrayed by Vincent Wong.
- Where the Wind Blows (2023), portrayed by Aaron Kwok and Chui Tien-you.
