= To Be Number One (film) =

1991 Hong Kong film by Poon Man-kit

- Film poster

Chinese name
- Traditional Chinese: 跛豪
- Simplified Chinese: 跛豪
Transcriptions
Standard Mandarin
- Hanyu Pinyin: Bǒ háo
Yue: Cantonese
- Jyutping: Bai1 Hou4
- Directed by: Poon Man-kit
- Screenplay by: Stephen Shiu; Johnny Mak
- Story by: Chan Wa; Lee Ying-kit
- Produced by: Stephen Shiu
- Starring: Ray Lui; Lawrence Ng; Waise Lee; Kent Cheng; Cecilia Yip; Amy Yip; Kenneth Tsang; Elvis Tsui
- Cinematography: Peter Pau (H.K.S.C)
- Edited by: Poon Hung
- Music by: Joseph Chan
- Production companies: Golden Harvest; Johnny Mak Production Co. Ltd
- Distributed by: Golden Harvest
- Release date: 5 April 1991
- Running time: 143 minutes
- Country: Hong Kong
- Language: Cantonese
- Box office: HK$38,703,363

To Be Number One (Chinese: 跛豪) is a 1991 Hong Kong gangster film directed by Poon Man-kit, and produced by Stephen Shiu. The film is based on the rise and fall of a real-life gangster Ng Sik-ho, who is portrayed in the film by Ray Lui. To Be Number One was a critical and box office success, grossing HK$38,703,363 at the Hong Kong box office and winning the Hong Kong Film Award for Best Film at the 11th Hong Kong Film Awards. In 2017, the film was remade as Chasing the Dragon.

== Plot ==
The protagonist Ho begins the story as a poor Teochew refugee from Communist China, and leads his men to become pawns of the corrupt policeman Fat Kwan to control the drug trade. After Ho establishes himself, Fat Kwan turns against him, cripples him and kills many of his men, but Ho keeps rising and eliminates all his enemies. However Ho is blinded by his growing power, and his empire ends with the establishment of ICAC.

== Cast and roles ==
- Ray Lui as Crippled Ho
- Lawrence Ng as Ming
- Waise Lee as Man
- Kent Cheng as Fat Kwan
- Cecilia Yip as Tse Yuen-yin
- Amy Yip as May
- Kenneth Tsang as Chief Inspector Tiger Lui
- Elvis Tsui as Dummy
- Tommy Wong as Loud Hung
- Dickens Chan as Big Sha
- Frankie Chan as Little Hak
- Lo Lieh as Boss Tin
- Ng Man-tat as Gold Teeth Ping
- Lau Shun as Boss Fung
- Lau Kong as Chief Inspector Lung
- Lily Ng as Man's wife
- Elvina Kong as Lui's deranged mistress
- Chin Tsi-ang as Ming's mother
- Wong Chi-keung as Fat restaurant boss
- Koo Wai-jan as Restaurateur boss' wife
- Victor Hon as Boss Kwong
- Dion Lam as Tin's bodyguard
- Chung Fat as Fat
- Lui tat as Opium den worker
- Wai Ching as Lui's assistant
- Jameson Lam as Ping's gangster
- Lee Ying-kit
- Wong Shu-tong
- Wong Kam-tong as Policeman interrogating Ho
- Mark Houghton as OSCG officer
- Tam Wai-man as Kwan's thug
- Leung Sam as Barber
- Fong Li as Chiang
- Wong Chung-kui as Kun
- Ng Kwok-fai as Unlucky gangster
- Ho Wing-cheung as Tin's bodyguard
- Chang Sing-kwong as Fat's thug
- Choi Hin-cheung
- Chan Hon-man

== Awards and nominations ==
Awards and nominations
Ceremony	Category	Recipient	Outcome
11th Hong Kong Film Awards	Best Film	To Be Number One	Won
11th Hong Kong Film Awards	Best Director	Poon Man-kit	Nominated
11th Hong Kong Film Awards	Best Screenplay	Johnny Mak, Stephen Shiu	Won
11th Hong Kong Film Awards	Best Actor	Ray Lui	Nominated
11th Hong Kong Film Awards	Best Supporting Actor	Kent Cheng	Nominated
11th Hong Kong Film Awards	Best Supporting Actress	Cecilia Yip	Nominated
11th Hong Kong Film Awards	Best Film Editing	Poon Hung	Nominated

Awards and achievements
Preceded by Days of Being Wild	Hong Kong Film Award for Best Film; 1992	Succeeded by Cageman
