= The Sun (Hong Kong) =

Defunct newspaper

- Front page, 2 March 2005
- Type: Daily newspaper
- Format: Tabloid
- Owner: Oriental Press Group Limited
- Founded: 18 March 1999
- Ceased publication: 1 April 2016
- Language: Traditional Chinese
- Headquarters: Tai Po Industrial Estate, Hong Kong
- Website: http://the-sun.on.cc

The Sun
- Traditional Chinese: 太陽報
- Simplified Chinese: 太阳报
Transcriptions
Standard Mandarin
- Hanyu Pinyin: Tàiyáng Bào

The Sun (Chinese: 太陽報; Jyutping: taai3 joeng4 bou3) was one of the newspapers in Hong Kong, first published in March 1999. It belonged to the Oriental Press Group Limited. The paper ceased publication in April 2016.

There was also an electronic version of The Sun on the Internet. Both the newspaper and the electronic version were written in traditional Chinese.

== Background ==
"No fear for wind and storm and with the emergence of the Sun, a sharp contrast will be found between black and white". (Chinese: 無懼風雨，太陽一出，黑白分明) was the slogan used by The Sun when it first appeared in the market. The phrase actually means "There is no need to fear trials and tribulations, for once the sun rises, all things will become clear, the righteous will shine and the wrong will hide in the shadows."

Since the newspaper market in 1999 has already been well-developed, The Sun adopted an aggressive marketing strategy to gain as much market share as possible, initially selling the paper for only $2. This triggered a price war among all the local newspapers in Hong Kong. At that time, most newspapers reduced their prices by half. However this competition did not last very long. The price of all newspapers gradually rose again after a few months' time. The Sun followed and gradually raised the price as well. Ultimately this price war made 6 newspaper companies run out of business.

In addition to price-cutting, The Sun used various methods to attract people to buy their paper, such as giving away T-shirts with the Sun's logo. Moreover, it enclosed some souvenirs such as toys, books and fast-food restaurant discount coupons.

== Style ==
The newspaper provided various kinds of news daily. It includes local and international news, financial news, entertainment news, sports news, technology information, horse-racing news and news reporting trendy stuff among young people.

The horseracing news was popular among horse betters. For the entertainment news, it reported both the local and foreign celebrities' news, so as to entertain different citizens' interests. In addition, it often used to offer coupons to readers as a way to attract more buyers.

In the page of financial news, there was a column for some financial analysts and economic experts to write articles related to the financial and stock market in Hong Kong. To further diversify its newspaper, The Sun was publishing a guide book with information of secondary schools and overseas schools for Form 5 students to read before the release of HKCEE results.

== Readership ==
Over 1,000,000 people read the Sun daily and 29,000 readers subscribe its electronic newspaper. It was the third best-selling newspaper in Hong Kong, whereas Oriental Daily and Apple Daily rank first and second respectively.

The Sun always sponsored organizations which promote teenage functions, for instance, JSSE, so as to increase the teenage pool to buy its newspaper. These sponsors were mainly communication services, mobile phone companies and supermarkets.

Most of the readers were youngsters and bourgeois. As their purchasing power is relatively high, it attracted people from different fields. They wanted to promote their products and pay money to put advertisements on the newspaper. The advertising fee was the lowest among the local newspapers as they have guaranteed.

== Major competitors ==
The reporting style, target market and target customers of Sun Daily were similar to that of Apple Daily and Oriental Daily News. Since the Sun and Oriental Daily News both belonged to the Oriental Press Group Limited, together they saw Apple Daily as the biggest competitor.

== Online edition ==
The Sun cooperated with Oriental Daily News to offer orisun.com. According to Ma Ching Kwan, chairman of Oriental Press Group, the site enabled overseas Chinese to keep up with Hong Kong news. The news was updated daily at 5.00am.

This co-operation provided many mutual benefits to both newspapers. They shared the up-to-date news together. This greatly helped both newspapers get higher rankings than other newspapers. To improve the quality of the service, orisun.com was equipping itself by getting better access to overseas database system and broadband service. This enabled the web-browsers from overseas to download the newspaper at a faster speed.

The online content was divided into seven parts: politics, finance, entertainment, sport, technology, feature and horse racing. For people who need to refer back to the old news, online newspaper would be really helpful. However, to browse any old news, the orisun.com charges, though it was still free for the-sun.com.hk.

orisun.com and the-sun.com.hk were struggling to secure market share as more and more newspapers and news magazines have online versions.

== Hotline ==
The Sun set up a hotline and a fax number for people to report the news happening around them. If those news possessed potential that could arouse citizens' interest or entertain people, reporters would investigate the issue and post them on the newspaper.

== Closure ==
The Sun ceased publication on 1 April 2016 after 17 years in print. The owner cited the "recent deteriorating business environment in Hong Kong" as the reason for the decision. Oriental Daily News, one of the bestselling papers in Hong Kong which is also owned by Oriental Press Group Limited, is not affected by the decision.

== See also ==
- List of newspapers in Hong Kong
- Newspaper Society of Hong Kong
- Hong Kong Audit Bureau of Circulations
