= Peter Godber =

Hong Kong police officer and criminal (born 1922)

Peter Fitzroy Godber
- Born: 7 April 1922; London, England
- Title: Chief Superintendent of the Royal Hong Kong Police
- Criminal charge: Corruption (25 February 1975)
- Criminal penalty: 4 years in prison and confiscation of HK$25,000

Peter Godber
- Traditional Chinese: 葛柏
Transcriptions
Yue: Cantonese
- Jyutping: got3 baak3

Peter Fitzroy Godber (Chinese: 葛柏; born 7 April 1922) was a Chief Superintendent of the Royal Hong Kong Police Force, serving as Deputy District Commander of Kowloon, Hong Kong. Embroiled in a bribery scandal shortly before his retirement in 1973, he fled to the United Kingdom. He was apprehended in 1974 by British police and extradited back to Hong Kong and subsequently convicted for police corruption and bribery. Godber was sentenced to four years in prison with HK$25,000 in restitution.

== Life and career ==
Born in London, Godber served as a police officer in Hastings before heading to Hong Kong in 1952. Before his downfall on corruption charges, Godber had been regarded as a brave and effective senior police officer who played a leading role in restoring order during the major disturbances of 1966–1967 and who was decorated for his efforts. At this time, the Red Guard unrest in mainland China, coupled with the Macau debacle in December 1966, stimulated the Communists in Hong Kong to try to bring down the colonial administration. Hong Kong was subject initially to industrial action, spreading to riots and a bombing campaign against those regarded by the Communists as opposing re-unification. Ten Hong Kong policemen were killed by bombs and attacks in the streets.

Before his retirement in 1973, Godber had the equivalent of nearly HK$4.4 million (approximately US$865,000 in 1973, equivalent to $6,300,000 in 2025) in bank accounts located in Canada, Australia, Singapore, the United States, the United Kingdom, and Hong Kong. The police anti-corruption branch investigated his mysterious wealth and ordered him to explain his source of income. In response, on 7 June 1973, Godber immediately arranged for his wife to leave the colony. On 8 June, he used his Civil Aviation Department permit to bypass immigration and passport checks and walked onto a plane at Kai Tak Airport for London. Godber's escape led to public outrage surrounding the integrity of the police's self-investigations and calls for reforms in the government's anti-corruption efforts. It also debunked a common conception among the governing elites that European office holders were immune to bribery and corruption. He was arrested on 29 April 1974 in England and extradited to Hong Kong on 7 January 1975. Trial began on 17 February and ended on 25 February, lasting six and a half days. He was convicted of corruption and sentenced to four years in prison plus confiscation of $25,000 HKD.

His conviction and other corruption activities in Hong Kong in the 1970s led to the creation of the Independent Commission Against Corruption in 1974. Godber was released from prison on 3 October 1977. In later years Godber and his family resided in Alicante, Spain.

== Honours ==
- United Kingdom :
  - Recipient of the Colonial Police Medal (CPM) (1968; revoked on 3 October 1975)
  - Recipient of the Colonial Police Long Service Medal (1970)
  - Recipient of the Queen's Police Medal (QPM) (1972; revoked on 3 October 1975)

== In popular culture ==
- In the 2017 film Chasing the Dragon, played by Szuc Michael.
- In the 2021 film Once Upon a Time in Hong Kong, played by Vincent Matile.
