= East Week =

Hong Kong-based magazine

- The logo of East Week
- Categories: Pro-Beijing
- Founded: 1992 by Oriental Press Group
- First issue: 29 October 1992
- Company: Sing Tao News Corporation; formerly: Emperor Group; formerly: Oriental Press Group
- Country: Hong Kong
- Language: Chinese/Cantonese (in traditional Chinese characters)
- Website: https://eastweek.my-magazine.me/

East Week (Chinese: 東周刊, Jyutping: dung1 zau1 hon1) is a Hong Kong–based weekly Chinese language magazine which was established by Oriental Press Group (the publisher of Oriental Daily News) on 29 October 1992 and sold to the Emperor Group in September 2001. It is now owned by Sing Tao News Corporation (former name: Global China Group Holdings), and published by China Touch Media Solutions & Services Limited.

== Development ==
=== Establishment and competition ===
Upon its establishment, East Week was positioned as a direct competitor to Next Magazine, published by Next Media Limited. Despite its efforts, East Week struggled to surpass Next Magazine, which consistently remained the top-selling magazine in Hong Kong with approximately 150,000 copies sold per issue. As a result, in September 2001, Ma Ching Fat, the Chairman of Oriental Press Group, decided to sell East Week to Emperor Group, owned by Albert Yeung.

=== Changes under Emperor Group ===
Following the acquisition by Albert Yeung, East Week underwent significant changes. The magazine shifted its focus, adopting sensational and controversial topics to attract readers. East Week began reporting on provocative stories such as the sex life of businessman Law Siu Fai and the extramarital affairs of banker David Li Kwok-po. These stories quickly became viral, generating widespread public awareness and interest.

=== Controversies and public response ===
East Week's sensational reporting methods sparked considerable controversy. Law Siu Fai claimed he was being defamed by East Week's reporting. A story involving an interview with Donald Tsang, former Chief Secretary of Hong Kong, drew public discontent. The article revealed details of Tsang's private life without his consent. In response to the backlash, East Week issued a public apology to Tsang and compensated him with $120,000 Hong Kong dollars to avoid legal action.

Another major incident occurred on 29 October 2002, the day of the publication's 10th anniversary, when the issue published a nude photo of actress Carina Lau. It was believed to have been taken forcibly when she was abducted 12 years ago. The issue was sold out that same afternoon, and its secondhand price hiked to $50–100 with none left in stock.

=== Public outrage and protests ===
The lack of media ethics demonstrated by East Week outraged the Hong Kong public, as well as entertainment professionals, women's rights groups, and government officials. Massive protests broke out in the days following the Carina Lau scandal, condemning the magazine's immorality. Actor Jackie Chan criticized the Hong Kong press as immoral, labeling it as primarily composed of paparazzi focused on prying into the private lives of celebrities and uncovering scandals for profit. Carina Lau was commended for her bravery in speaking publicly at the rallies.

=== Temporary shutdown ===
Under immense pressure, Albert Yeung was forced to shut down East Week on 1 November 2002. The scandal led to the temporary suspension of the magazine's 10-year-long publication. Despite East Week's apology for its actions, the controversy surrounding "freedom of the press" persisted. The Hong Kong police initiated a criminal investigation, resulting in the arrests of several employees involved in the scandal.

=== Revival and new ownership ===
On 3 September 2003, East Week re-entered the market with a renewed image, aiming to become a significant rival to other entertainment magazines. The publication's ownership transitioned from Albert Yeung's Emperor Group to Charles Ho Tsu Kwok's Global China Group Holdings Limited, which also owns several local newspapers, such as Sing Tao Daily and Hong Kong Standard. Ho Kwok Fai, CEO of China Touch, announced that Lai Ting Yiu, the Executive Chief Editor of Sing Tao News Corporation, had been appointed as the Editor-in-Chief of East Week to oversee overall operations and editorial matters.

=== Business potential and investment ===
The acquisition of East Week was motivated by its strong business potential, having established a wide readership base and advertiser support over the past decade. Ho Kwok Fai estimated the investment in East Week to be around 40 to 50 million Hong Kong dollars. He revealed that any financial losses from the first four issues would be covered by a well-known supermarket chain, whose name remained undisclosed. He anticipated that the publication would start generating profit within 1.5 to 2 years.

=== Editorial changes ===
Alongside changes in ownership, East Week also shifted its editorial positioning. The magazine adopted a more balanced and objective approach, aiming to provide content-driven coverage of celebrity news. Its new mission was to reveal the truth and address concerns relevant to all Hong Kong residents. Ho Tsu Kwok stated that East Week's entry into the China market would depend on mainland government regulations and laws.

=== First issue after revival ===
The first issue of the revived East Week, released on 3 September 2003, featured a new design and layout. The cover story included an interview with Carina Lau discussing her new movie, Infernal Affairs II, and a feature on singer Anita Mui seeking treatment for cancer from a renowned oncologist.

== See also ==
- Media of Hong Kong
