= Newspaper Society of Hong Kong =

The Newspaper Society of Hong Kong (Chinese: 香港報業公會), set up on May 10, 1954, is the largest newspaper industrial society in Hong Kong, founded by Hong Kong's four largest newspapers at the time - The Kung Sheung Daily News (closed), Wah Kiu Yat Po (closed), Sing Tao Daily and South China Morning Post. Existing members include 14 major newspapers, although Oriental Daily News has chosen not to participate.
