= Oriental Daily News =

Chinese newspaper in Hong Kong

- Type: Daily newspaper
- Format: Broadsheet
- Owner: Oriental Press Group
- Publisher: Oriental Press Group
- Founded: 22 January 1969; 57 years ago
- Political alignment: Pro-Beijing
- Language: Traditional Chinese
- Headquarters: Tai Po Industrial Estate, Hong Kong
- Circulation: 530,000
- Sister newspapers: The Sun (Hong Kong) (Ceased publication)
- ISSN: 1018-8177
- Website: orientaldaily.on.cc

Oriental Daily News
- Traditional Chinese: 東方日報
- Simplified Chinese: 东方日报
Transcriptions
Standard Mandarin
- Hanyu Pinyin: Dōngfāng Rìbào
Yue: Cantonese
- Yale Romanization: Dung^{1}fong^{1} Yat^{6}bou^{3}
- Jyutping: Dung^{1}fong^{1} Jat^{6}bou^{3}
- IPA: [tʊŋ˥fɔŋ˥ jɐt̚˨pɔw˧]

Oriental Daily News is a Chinese-language newspaper in Hong Kong. It was established in 1969 by Ma Sik-yu and Ma Sik-chun, and was one of the two newspapers published by the Oriental Press Group Limited (Chinese: 東方報業集團有限公司).

== History ==
The paper was founded in 1969. Apple Daily was its main competitor. The newspaper's website was started in February 2002, and includes e-paper versions of Oriental Daily. The whole printed version is uploaded onto the web allowing people from all over the world to read. It is considered Pro-Beijing camp in its editorial stance. Relative to other Hong Kong newspapers, Oriental Daily News has an older readership, with an average reader age of 38 as of 2014.

== Content ==
It has two editorials every day. The first one is called the 'Main Editorial' (正論), which is a typical newspaper editorial. The second one is called 'Kung Fu Tea' (功夫茶), which is written in the vernacular form of Cantonese, and is a daily critique of the misfits of the bureaucracy.

== See also ==
- Media of Hong Kong
- List of newspapers in Hong Kong
- Newspaper Society of Hong Kong
- Hong Kong Audit Bureau of Circulations
- Murder of Ho Wai-ha, crime committed by its regional distributor
