= Oriental Press Group =

Hong Kong publishing company

Oriental Media Group Limited

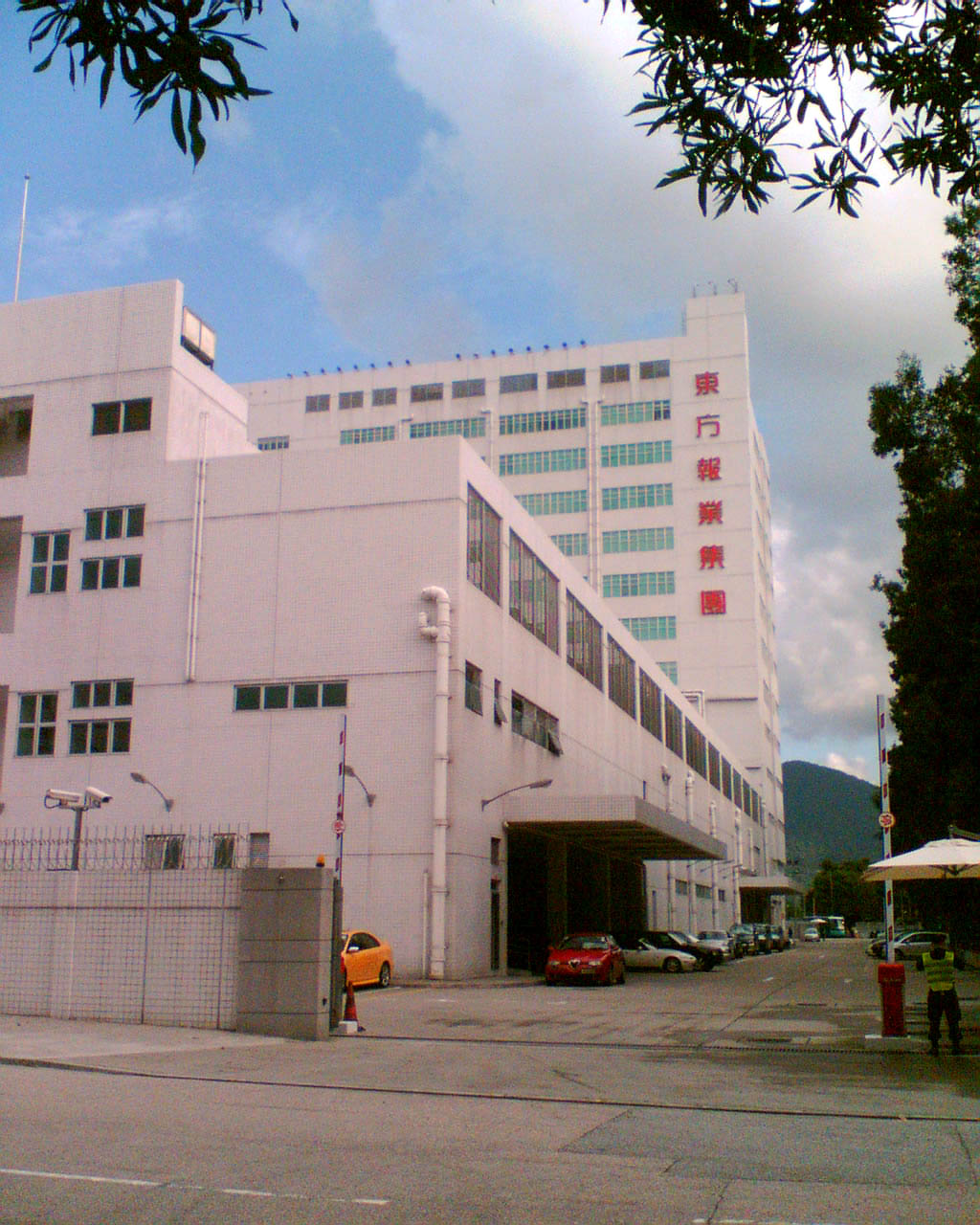
- The headquarters in Tai Po Industrial Estate
- Formerly: Oriental Press Group; Oriental Enterprise Holdings
- Company type: Public
- Traded as: SEHK: 18
- Industry: Publishing
- Founded: 14 January 1969; 57 years ago in British Hong Kong
- Founder: Ma Shek-chun
- Headquarters: Hong Kong
- Area served: Hong Kong
Key people
| Ma Ching-fat | (Chairman) |
| Ma Ching-choi | (Vice-Chairman) |
- Products: newspaper
- Services: news website; news and current affairs app; stock market app
- Owner: Ma Shek-chun family
- Website: opg.on.cc

Oriental Media Group Limited is the publishing company of Hong Kong newspaper Oriental Daily News, as well as now defunct The Sun and Eastern Express. Oriental Media Group was the founding company of the magazines East Week, East Touch and Oriental Sunday, but the magazines were sold in the 2000s. Oriental Media Group, through subsidiary, operates news website on.cc. The shares of Oriental Media Group is traded in the Stock Exchange of Hong Kong. It was formerly called Oriental Press Group Limited and Oriental Enterprise Holdings Limited.

== History ==
Oriental Press Group Limited is incorporated on 14 January 1969 and start to publish Oriental Daily News on 22 January of the same year.

The company is listed on the Stock Exchange of Hong Kong Limited since 18 August 1987.

== Products and services ==
Oriental Daily News is one of the major newspaper of Hong Kong. Its archrival is Apple Daily and other Chinese/Cantonese language newspapers of Hong Kong.

On top of its flagship newspaper Oriental Daily News, the company also founded The Sun (太陽報) in 1999 and Eastern Express. The former was published in Traditional Chinese characters while the latter was an English newspaper. Nevertheless, they were folded.

The company also founded a series of magazines that named after 東 (transliterated as East or Oriental): East Week (東周刊), Oriental Sunday (東方新地) and East Touch (東Touch). All of them were sold from 2001 to 2002 to Emperor Group or Sing Tao Holdings. Some of them are still published by other companies.

The company launches the news website on.cc (at that time use the url orisun.com) in 2000. It offers the online version of Oriental Daily News under the sub domain orientaldaily.on.cc, as well as streaming video news occasionally.

== Management and ownership ==
The company is founded by Ma Shek-chun (馬惜珍), which Ma's son, Ma Ching-kwan (馬澄坤), takeover the operation in 1977. Ma Shek-chun was fled to Taiwan in the 1970s as a crime suspect and was wanted by Hong Kong Police Force for over 30 years.

Ma Shek-chun two other sons, Ma Ching-fat (馬澄發) and Ma Ching-choi (馬澄財), are the current chairman and vice-chairman of the company respectively.

== See also ==
- Hong Kong Economic Times Holdings, another listed newspaper publishing company of Hong Kong
- Media Chinese International, another listed newspaper publishing company of Hong Kong and Malaysia
- Next Digital, another listed newspaper publishing company of Hong Kong
- Sing Tao News Corporation, another listed newspaper publishing company of Hong Kong
