= Lee Rock II =

1991 Hong Kong film by Lawrence Ah Mon

- Film poster
- Traditional Chinese: 五億探長雷洛傳II之父子情仇
- Simplified Chinese: 五亿探长雷洛传II之父子情仇
- Hanyu Pinyin: Wǔ Yì Tàn Zhǎng Léi Luò Chuán Èr Zhī Fù Zǐ Qíng Chóu
- Jyutping: Ng2 Yik1 Taam3 Zeong2 Leoi4 Lok6 Zyun2 Ji6 Zi1 Fu6 Zi2 Cing4 Sau4
- Directed by: Lawrence Ah Mon
- Screenplay by: Chan Man-keung; Chan Wah
- Produced by: Jimmy Heung; Wong Jing
- Starring: Andy Lau; Sharla Cheung; Aaron Kwok; Chingmy Yau; Ng Man-tat; Paul Chun
- Cinematography: Gigo Lee; Andrew Lau
- Edited by: Kwong Chi-leung; Yu Shun
- Music by: Chow Kung-sing
- Production company: Win's Pictures
- Distributed by: Gala Film Distribution Limited
- Release date: 10 October 1991
- Running time: 111 minutes
- Country: Hong Kong
- Language: Cantonese
- Box office: HK$23,135,334

Lee Rock II is a 1991 Hong Kong crime drama film directed by Lawrence Ah Mon and starring Andy Lau, Sharla Cheung, Aaron Kwok and Chingmy Yau. The film is a direct sequel to Lee Rock released earlier in the same year and continues its adaptation of the life of corrupt police officer Lui Lok (portrayed in the film as Lee Rock by Lau).

== Plot ==
In 1959, Yau Ma Tei foreign detective Reeve retires, leading to a competition between bitter rivals Lee Rock (Andy Lau) and Ngan Tung (Paul Chun) for the position. Although Ngan ultimately gets the position, Lee is promoted to Chief Chinese Sergeant Major, a position that supersedes all Chinese police officers including Ngan in seniority. After Lee takes office, he reforms each department, gaining support from many businessmen and his momentum rises while Ngan's standing plummets, fueling his hatred towards Lee. He hires a henchman from mobster King Crab (Michael Chan) in a failed assassination ploy against Lee. Fearing he will be discovered, Ngan has Crab killed. Lee continues to consolidate power and throughout the 1960s, gains complete control of the entire Hong Kong Police Force and its operations whilst actively investing in commercial real estate, entertainment and many other fields. He comes to amass an estimated wealth of HK$500 million.

In 1972, British officer Sutcliffe is appointed the new Commissioner of Police, though he quickly uncovers mass corruption within the Hong Kong Police and swears to oust all its criminal activities. Two years later, anti-corruption agency ICAC is established. Faced with the encroaching threats to his livelihood, Lee plans to transfer all of his assets to Canada and immigrate there with his wife Grace (Sharla Cheung) and their daughter. He vows to make Rose(Chingmy Yau) his second wife and during a reunion with her, learns she has had his son, Bill. However, a law against polygamy passes in Hong Kong and, hoping to avoid being the third party between Lee and Grace, Rose chooses to leave with Bill and settles in Australia.

Years pass and Rose and a now adult Bill (Aaron Kwok) return to Hong Kong where they reunite with Lee. Though Rose hopes Bill will accept Lee as his father, Bill, being a member of the ICAC and believing Lee abandoned his mother to fend for herself, vows to arrest him and put an end to his illicit operations. Broken-hearted from seeing the animosity between father and son, Rose collapses and is hospitalized. Lee rushes to the hospital but en route is injured, narrowly escaping a car-bombing planted by King Crab's younger brother, who desires to avenge his brother and had been led to believe he had been killed by Lee by Ngan. Lee and Bill witness Rose's death at the hospital and Bill, out of respect for his mother, lets Lee leave. However, both are attacked by assailants and fend them off, culminating in a final standoff between Lee and Ngan. When the latter taunts Lee to arrest him, Bill intervenes on his father's behalf and apprehends Ngan.

The film's epilogue depicts various corrupt police officers being arrested by the ICAC while the wanted Lee enjoys a stable life with his family in Canada.

== Cast ==
- Andy Lau as Lee Rock
- Sharla Cheung as Grace Pak
- Aaron Kwok as Bill Lee
- Chingmy Yau as Rose
- Ng Man-tat as Lardo
- Paul Chun as Ngan Tung
- Charles Heung as Sergeant Lam Kong
- Michael Chan as King Crab
- James Tien as Silverfish
- Victor Hon as Hau
- Louis Roth as Commissioner Alan
- Wong Chi-keung as Detective Yeung
- Peter Chan as Kirin / Fire Dragon
- Jameson Lam as Rock's detective at station
- Cheung Tat-ming as Ng Hak-ping
- Hung Yan-yan as Shrimp Head / Lu
- John Wakefield as Translator for Commissioner Alan
- Dave Lam as Detective Tak
- Wai Ching as Sergeant at meeting
- Wong Siu-ming as Detective with gun at night club
- Danny Chow as One of Shrimp Head's Men
- Ridley Tsui as One of Shrimp Head's Men
- Wong Chi-keung as thug beating molester
- Ho Wing-cheung as thug beating molester
- Michael Dinga as ICAC officer
- Tam Wai-man as molester
- Jim James as police officer
- Lam Foo-wai as thug
- Lau Chi-ming as Shrimp's thug at hospital
- Tsim Siu-ling as Shrimp's thug at hospital
- Huang Kai-sen as Shrimp's thug at hospital

== Box office ==
The film grossed HK$23,135,334 during its theatrical run from 10 October to 20 November 1991 in Hong Kong.

== See also ==
- Andy Lau filmography
- Aaron Kwok filmography
- Wong Jing filmography
