= Lee Rock =

1991 Hong Kong film by Lawrence Ah Mon

- Official film poster
- Traditional Chinese: 五億探長雷洛傳: 雷老虎
- Simplified Chinese: 五亿探长雷洛传: 雷老虎
- Hanyu Pinyin: Wǔ Yì Tàn Zháng Léi Luò Chuán: Léi Lǎo Hǔ
- Jyutping: Ng5 Jik1 Taam3 Zeong2 Leoi4 Lok6 Zyun2: Leoi4 Lou2 Fu2
- Directed by: Lawrence Ah Mon
- Written by: Chan Man-keung
- Produced by: Wong Jing; Jimmy Heung
- Starring: Andy Lau; Sharla Cheung; Chingmy Yau; Ng Man-tat; Paul Chun
- Cinematography: Andrew Lau; Gigo Lee
- Edited by: Kong Chi-leung; Yu Shun
- Music by: Chow Kung-shing
- Production company: Win's Pictures
- Distributed by: Gala Film Distribution Limited
- Release date: 19 September 1991 (Hong Kong)
- Running time: 100 minutes
- Country: Hong Kong
- Language: Cantonese
- Box office: HK$30,694,333

Lee Rock (Chinese: 五億探長雷洛傳: 雷老虎) is a 1991 Hong Kong crime film directed by Lawrence Ah Mon, and starring Andy Lau as the title character. The film chronicles the rise and fall of a corrupt police force that Lee Rock becomes a part of. The film was followed by a sequel, Lee Rock II, released later in the same year.

== Cast and roles ==
- Andy Lau as Lee Rock
- Sharla Cheung as Grace Pak
- Chingmy Yau as Ha / Rose
- Ng Man-tat as Piggy
- Paul Chun as Sergeant Ngan Tung
- Kwan Hoi-san as Sergeant Chan
- Michael Chan as King Crab
- William Ho as Triad Boss
- Lee Siu-kei as Drill Officer
- Eddy Ko as Police instructor
- Chun Wong as Big Brother Ma
- Jamie Luk as Little Brother Ma
- Lung Fong as Master Snake
- James Tien as Pak / Silverfish
- Wong Yat-fei as Ha's Father
- Louis Roth as Commissioner Alan
- Ridley Tsui as Rascal at nightclub
- Cheung Tsan-sang as Mad Dog
- Jonathan Isgar as British Police Officer

== Awards and nominations ==
Awards and nominations
Ceremony	Category	Recipient	Outcome
11th Hong Kong Film Awards
11th Hong Kong Film Awards	Best Film	Lee Rock	Nominated
11th Hong Kong Film Awards	Best Director	Lawrence Ah Mon	Nominated
11th Hong Kong Film Awards	Best Actor	Andy Lau	Nominated
11th Hong Kong Film Awards	Best Supporting Actor	Kwan Hoi-san	Won
11th Hong Kong Film Awards	Best Supporting Actress	Chingmy Yau	Nominated
11th Hong Kong Film Awards	Best Screenplay	Chan Man-keung	Nominated
11th Hong Kong Film Awards	Best Cinematography	Andrew Lau, Gigo Lee	Nominated
11th Hong Kong Film Awards	Best Art Direction	Jason Mok	Nominated
28th Golden Horse Awards
28th Golden Horse Awards	Best Supporting Actor	Kwan Hoi-san	Won
