= Akio Hong =

- 項明生
- Born: September 12, 1969 (age 56); Chengdu, Suchuan, China
- Education: BA in Psychology and Philosophy from the University of Hong Kong in 1992. Master's in Marketing from Chinese University of Hong Kong.
- Occupations: travel writer broadcaster TV host columnist
- Television: TVB travelogues Cable TV Hong Kong and Open TV travelogues
- Board member of: Sony

James "Akio" Xiang (Chinese: 項明生) (born 12 Sep 1969) is a travel writer, broadcaster, TV host and columnist from Hong Kong.

== Education ==
Hong was born in Chengdu, Sichuan, China. He moved to Hong Kong when he was 15 years old with his family. He attended HKSYCIA Wong Tai Shan Memorial College during 1985 to 1989.

In 1992, he was awarded a BA in Psychology and Philosophy from the University of Hong Kong. He also studied German in Bremen University in 1990, and Japanese language from 1989 to 1992. Then he completed his master's in marketing at the Chinese University of Hong Kong.

== Career ==
Hong began his marketing career in two Japanese brands, namely Fujifilm Hong Kong (1992 to 1997) and Sony Computer Entertainment Hong Kong (1997 to 2013). He was awarded as 2006 Most Outstanding Marketer of the Year from HKMA due to his PSP marketing campaign.

He was promoted as the first Chinese in the Board of Director in Sony in 2011.

He moved from marketing to travel writing from 2009 when his first book《5000 Years of Adventure》(足足五千年) was published and raised HK$500,000 for Heifer International Hong Kong. The electronic version of this book was ranked No. 1 at the Hong Kong eBook Chart for a consecutive 13 days.

Hong started to write columns for various newspaper since 2009 including Oriental Daily, The Sun(太陽報, 已關閉), HK Economic Journal, Metro Daily, am730, Sky Post 晴報, Headline Daily, etc.

== TV works ==
Hong later jointed TVB, Now TV and Cable TV to host a series of travelogue programs.

Premiere	Title	Translation	Role
TVB
18, Feb, 2013	叻哥遊世界-巴西篇	Nat Around The World (Brazil)	Guest host
25, May, 2015	一路向東非	Heading to East Africa	Host and writer
18, June, 2016	日韓台櫻花三角戀	Sakura Blossom in Japan, Korea and Taiwan	Host, research, copywriter, and Producer, Co-host with Chip Tsao
12, Nov, 2016	日耳曼的天空	Under the Germanic Sky	Host, research, copywriter, Producer Co-host with: Chip Tsao
8, June, 2017	京都奈良夢華錄	Dreaming about ancient China in Kyoto and Nara	Host, research, copywriter, Producer
Cable TV Hong Kong, Open TV
28, Oct, 2018	明治憑什麼	Meiji Restoration 150th Anniversary Travelogue	Host, research, copywriter, producer Co-host with Chip Tsao
3, Aug, 2019	明日世遺	UNESCO World Heritage in Tomorrow	Host, research, copywriter, producer

== Publications ==
Major works by Hong.

Title	Translation	Publication On	ISBN	Publisher
足足五千年	5000 Years of Adventure	2009	ISBN 978-988-18-4512-2	Soleil Marketing Co. Ltd
足足五千年-電子版	5000 Years of Adventure - EBook	2010		Innopage Ltd
十天敢動假期：墨西哥、古巴	10 Stunning Days in Mexico and Cuba	2011	ISBN 978-962-14-4619-0	Wanli Book
十天敢動假期：秘魯	10 Stunning Days in Peru	2012	ISBN 978-962-14-4950-4	Wanli Book
十天敢動假期：巴西	10 Stunning Days in Brazil	2013	ISBN 978-962-14-4678-7	Wanli Book
十天敢動假期：南極、阿根廷、烏拉圭	10 Stunning Days in Antarctica, Argentina, Uruguay	2013	ISBN 979-988-216-286-9	Wanli Book
異色‧北韓	Colors of North Korea	2013	ISBN 978-988-219-892-0	Cosmos Books
足足五萬年	50,000 Years of Adventures	2013	ISBN 979-988-216-286-9	Crown Publishing Co
足足五萬年：西遊記	50,000 Years of Adventures: India	2014	ISBN 978-988-216-330-0	Crown Publishing Co
快樂到極點：從北極到南極	From Pole to Pole: Arctic to Antarctica	2014	ISBN 978-988-8254-89-7	Cosmos Books
足足五萬年：世界通史精華遊	50,000 Years of Adventures: Travel in General History	2014	ISBN 978-988-216-332-4	Crown Publishing Co
十天敢動假期：天空之鏡、復活節島	10 Stunning Days in Bolivia, Chile, Easter Island	2014	ISBN 978-962-14-5452-2	Wanli Book
足足五千年(簡體字版)	5000 Years of Adventures (Simplified Chinese)	2015	ISBN 978-7-80768-051-2	Joint Publishing
日本東北花見紀行	Sakura journey in Tohoku, Japan	2015	ISBN 978-988-13350-4-3	豐林出版
提前退休, 坐郵輪遊世界	Cruising around the world after earlier retirement	2015	ISBN 978-988-8255-63-4	Cosmo Books
足足五萬年：跟達爾文去進化島	50,000 Years of Adventures: Galapagos with Charles Darwin	2015	ISBN 978-988-216-381-2	Crown Publishing Co
人生若只如花見	Sakura journey in Tohoku Japan (II)	2016	ISBN 979-988-77196-0-1	5000 Years Adventure Co
提前退休2：坐河船遊世界	Cruising around the world by river cruise (Earlier Retirement II)	2016	ISBN 978-988-8257-25-6	Cosmo Books
十天敢動假期：墨西哥、古巴(簡體字版)	10 Stunning Days in Mexico, Cuba(Simplified Chinese)	2016	ISBN 978-7-80768-112-0	Joint Publishing
《十天敢動假期：巴西、秘魯》簡體字	10 Stunning Days in Brazil, Peru (Simplified Chinese)	2016	ISBN 978-7-80768-113-7	Joint Publishing
《十天敢動假期：阿根廷、南極》簡體字	10 Stunning Days in Antarctica, Argentina, Uruguay(Simplified Chinese)	2016	ISBN 978-7-80768-115-1	Joint Publishing
《十天敢動假期：玻利維亞、智利》簡體字	10 Stunning Days in Bolivia, Chile (Simplified Chinese)	2016	ISBN 978-7-80768-114-4	Joint Publishing
提前退休3：坐郵輪遊冰島、大西洋、太平洋	Crusing to Iceland, Atlantic, Pacific Ocean	2017	ISBN 978-988-8258-09-3	Cosmo Books
天地之旅	Voyage of a lifetime	2017	ISBN 978-988-165-477-9	Buddhist Compassion
提前退休 4：坐河船遊多瑙河、巴爾幹及意大利	River Cruising to Danube, Balkans, Italy	2018	ISBN 9789888547029	Cosmo Books
明治憑什麼	Meiji Restoration 150th Anniversary Travelogue	2019	ISBN 9789888548200	Cosmo Books
明日世遺	World Heritage of Tomorrow	2020	ISBN 9789888548798	Cosmo Books

== Radio Programme ==
Hong has hosted a radio programme on Commercial Radio Hong Kong named Global Explorer (全世界嚮導) since 2018 that runs on Fridays from 10:30pm to 11:00pm.
