= List of newspapers in Hong Kong =

This is a list of newspapers in Hong Kong. Hong Kong is home to many of Asia's biggest English and Chinese language newspapers. The territory has one of the world's largest press industries and is a major centre for print journalism.

== Overview ==
=== Popularity ===
The Chinese language newspapers Headline Daily and Oriental Daily News have the highest shares in the Hong Kong newspaper market, while the Hong Kong Economic Times is the best-selling financial newspaper. The Standard, a free tabloid with a mass market strategy, is the most widely circulated English newspaper by a significant margin. Its rival, South China Morning Post, has the most paid subscribers among English-language papers in Hong Kong.

Apple Daily had one of the highest circulations before its closure in 2021. It had a feisty, tabloid style, concentrating on celebrity gossip and paparazzi photography, with sensationalist news reportage and a noted anti-government political position. The Chinese language publications were written to some degree with colloquial Cantonese phrases.

=== Media landscape and pricing ===
The number of newspapers in the market has been stable for a long time. Occasional attempts to establish new types of newspaper and themed papers generally cannot compete with the established brands. However, the entry into the market of free newspapers Metropolis Daily, Headline Daily, am730, and The Epoch Times spurred competition. In September 2007, The Standard changed its business model from a traditional daily into a free-sheet, distributed in commercial districts like Central and Admiralty.

Most papers sell at a cover price of HK$12, except South China Morning Post (HK$16) and Hong Kong Economic Journal (HK$15). The economic recession brought about by SARS in 2003 led to some resellers pricing at $1 below the recommended price. According to the HK Newspaper Hawkers Association, the situation lasted through to 2008, when around 10% of sellers maintained the cut price despite the change in the prevailing economic climate. The Association urged a return to resale price maintenance.

== Chinese-language newspapers ==
Newspapers in Hong Kong are considered to follow a particular political stance, with most being pro-Beijing. There has long been a lively tabloid sector, including Oriental Daily, (formerly) The Sun and (formerly) Apple Daily.

=== Daily print newspapers ===
| Newspaper | Chinese name | Established | Type | Issued | Position |
|---|---|---|---|---|---|
| Ta Kung Pao | 大公報 | 1902 in Tientsin; 1938 in Hong Kong | Paid | Daily | State-controlled (Note: † The indicated news outlets are indirectly owned and controlled by the Liaison Office of the Central People's Government.) |
| Sing Tao Daily | 星島日報 | 1938 | Paid | Daily | Pro-government |
| Wen Wei Po | 文匯報 | 1938 in Shanghai; 1948 in Hong Kong | Paid | Daily | State-controlled |
| Sing Pao Daily News | 成報 | 1939 | Paid | Daily | Pro-government |
| Hong Kong Commercial Daily | 香港商報 | 1952 | Paid | Daily | State-controlled |
| Ming Pao | 明報 | 1959 | Paid | Daily | Pro-government |
| Oriental Daily News | 東方日報 | 1969 | Paid | Daily | Pro-government |
| Hong Kong Economic Journal | 信報財經新聞 | 1973 | Paid | Monday–Saturday | Pro-government |
| Hong Kong Economic Times | 香港經濟日報 | 1988 | Paid | Monday–Saturday | Pro-government |
| Headline Daily | 頭條日報 | 2005 | Free | Monday–Saturday | Pro-government |
| am730 | am730 | 2005 | Free | Monday–Friday | Centrist |
| Lion Rock Daily | 香港仔 | 2018 | Free | Monday–Friday | State-controlled |

=== Weekly or quarterly newspapers ===
| Newspaper | Chinese name | Established | Type | Issued | Position |
|---|---|---|---|---|---|
| Kung Kao Po | 公教報 | 1928 | Paid | Every Sunday | Catholic, moderate |
| Christian Times | 時代論壇 | 1987 | Paid | Every Sunday | Christian, pro-democracy |
| The Epoch Times | 大紀元時報 | 2005 | Free | Every weekend | Falun Gong, pro-democracy |
| Passion Times | 熱血時報 | 2012 | Free | Quarterly (Note: Changed from monthly to quarterly since September 2021) | Localist, anti-communist (Note: Though Stand News reported it being more moderate after cutting ties with Civic Passion) |

=== Newspaper-turned-online media ===
| Media | Chinese name | Established | Printing ended | Type | Issued | Position |
|---|---|---|---|---|---|---|
| HK01 | 香港01 | 2016 | 2022 | Paid | Weekly | Pro-government |
| Sky Post | 晴報 | 2011 | 2023 | Free | Daily | Pro-government |

=== Online only ===
| Media | Chinese name | Established | Position |
|---|---|---|---|
| Orange News | 橙新聞 | 2014 | State-controlled |

=== Defunct newspapers ===
| Newspaper | Chinese name | Established | Closed | Operated | Position | Notes |
|---|---|---|---|---|---|---|
| Chinese Serial | 遐爾貫珍 | 1853 | 1856 | 2 yrs | | |
| Chinese Mail | 華字日報 | 1872 | 1946 | 74 yrs | Business | |
| Universal Circulating Herald | 循環日報 | 1874; 1959 | 1947; 1963 | 72 yrs 4 yrs | Pro-reform | |
| China | 中國日報 | 1900 | 1913 | 13 yrs | Pro-reform | |
| The World News | 世界公益報 | 1903 | 1917 | 14 yrs | Pro-revolutionary | |
| | 廣東日報 | 1904 in Hong Kong | 1906 | 2 yrs | Pro-revolutionary | |
| | 有所謂報; 東方報 | 1905; 1906 | 1906; 1907 | 2 yrs | Pro-revolutionary | |
| | 大光報 | 1912 | 1932 | 20 yrs | | |
| | 香江晚報 | 1921 | 1929 | 8 yrs | | |
| Kung Sheung Daily News | 工商日報 | 1925 | 1984 | 59 yrs | Pro-Kuomintang | |
| Wah Kiu Yat Po | 華僑日報 | 1925 | 1995 | 70 yrs | Pro-Kuomintang | |
| | 香港小日報 | 1929 | 1930 | 1 yr | | |
| | 南華日報 | 1930 | 1944 | 14 yrs | Pro-Japan | |
| Hong Kong Times | 香港時報 | 1939 | 1993 | 54 yrs | Pro-Kuomintang | |
| | 華商晚報; 華商報 | 1941; 1946 | 1941; 1949 | 1 yr 3 yrs | Pro-communist | |
| | 正報 | 1945 | 1948 | 3 yrs | Pro-communist | |
| | 新生晚報 | 1945 | 1976 | 31 yrs | | |
| New Evening Post | 新晚報 | 1950; 2012 | 1997; 2014 | 47 yrs 2 yrs | Pro-communist | |
| Ching Po Daily | 晶報 | 1956 | 1991 | 35 yrs | Pro-communist | |
| Hong Kong Daily News | 新報 | 1959 | 2015 | 56 yrs | | |
| Tin Tin Daily News | 天天日報 | 1960 | 2000 | 40 yrs | | |
| Express News | 快報 | 1963 | 1998 | 35 yrs | | |
| | 星報 | 1965 | 1984 | 19 yrs | | |
| Popular Daily | 萬人日報 | 1975 | ? | ? | Anti-communist | |
| | 兒童日報 | 1989 | 1990 | 1 yr | | |
| | 香港聯合報 | 1992 | 1995 | 3 yrs | | |
| | 現代日報 | 1993 | 1994 | 1 yr | | |
| Apple Daily | 蘋果日報 | 1995 | 2021 | 26 yrs | Pro-democrat | |
| The Sun | 太陽報 | 1999 | 2016 | 17 yrs | Pro-communist | |
| Metro Daily | 都市日報 | 2002 | 2019 | 17 yrs | | |
| Sharp Daily | 爽報 | 2011 | 2013 | 2 yrs | Pro-democrat | |
| | 快馬 | 2012 | 2013 | 1 yr | | |

=== Defunct online media ===
| Media | Chinese name | Established | Closed |
|---|---|---|---|
| House News | 主場新聞 | 2012 | 2014 |
| Inkstone News | | 2018 | 2021 |
| Stand News | 立場新聞 | 2014 | 2021 |
| Citizen News | 眾新聞 | 2017 | 2022 |
| FactWire | 傳真社 | 2015 | 2022 |

== English-language newspapers ==
Hong Kong is also the base of regional editions of foreign English-language newspapers. The New York Times International Edition and the Financial Times are published in Hong Kong.

From 10 September 2007, The Standard switched to free, advertising-supported distribution. The South China Morning Post announced on 11 December 2015 that the Alibaba Group would acquire the South China Morning Post from Malaysian tycoon Robert Kuok, who had owned it since 1993. As of 5 April 2016, the South China Morning Post's online content became free to read.

| Newspapers | Chinese name | Established | Type | Issued | Position |
|---|---|---|---|---|---|
| South China Morning Post | 南華早報 | 1903 | Paid | Daily | Moderate |
| Sunday Examiner | | 1946 | Paid | Every Sunday | Catholic, moderate |
| China Daily Hong Kong Edition | 中國日報香港版 | 1997 | Paid | Monday–Friday | State-owned |
| The Standard | 英文虎報 | 1949 | Free | Monday–Friday | Pro-government |
| Career Times | | 1997 | | Every Friday | |
| The SUN (Note: Bilingual, in English and Tagalog) | | 1995 | | | |

=== Online only ===
- Hong Kong Free Press
- Asia Times

=== Defunct newspapers ===
| Media | Chinese name | Established | Closed | Notes |
|---|---|---|---|---|
| The Friend of China | 中國之友; 華友西報 | 1842 | 1861 | moved to mainland in 1860 |
| The Hong Kong Register | | 1843 | 1863 | |
| The China Mail | 中國郵報; later 德臣西報 | 1845 | 1974 | |
| Overland China Mail | | 1848 | 1941 | Weekly edition of The China Mail |
| Hong Kong Daily Press | 孖剌沙西報; 每日雜報 | 1864 | 1941 | |
| Hongkong Telegraph | 士蔑西報; 士蔑新聞 | 1881 | 1951 | |
| Hong Kong Weekly Press | 香港周報 | 1890 | 1945 | |
| Hong Kong Sunday Herald | 香港星期先鋒報 | 1929 | ≥1941 | |
| Hong Kong News | 進時編錄 | 1941 | 1945 | printed on the abandoned presses of SCMP during Japanese occupation |
| The Wall Street Journal Asia | 亞洲華爾街日報 | 1976 | 2017 | |
| The Star | 英文星報 | 1965 | 1984 | |
| Eastern Express | 東快訊 | 1994 | 1996 | |

== Newspapers in other languages ==
- Hong Kong Post (香港ポスト) (Japanese)
- Wednesday Journal (홍콩수요저널) (Korean)
- Suara (Indonesian)
- Filipino Globe (Filipino)
- Everest Weekly (Nepalese)

== See also ==
- Newspaper Society of Hong Kong
- Hong Kong Audit Bureau of Circulations
- Media of Hong Kong
- Censorship in Hong Kong
- List of newspapers in China
