= Religion in Hong Kong =

Religion in Hong Kong (2024)
1. No religion or not mentioned (48.9%)
2. Protestantism (13.8%)
3. Catholicism (5.20%)
4. Taoism (13.3%)
5. Buddhism (13.3%)
6. Islam (4.00%)
7. Hinduism (1.30%)

Religion in Hong Kong is characterised by a multi-faith diversity of beliefs and practices. Most of the Hong Kong people of Chinese descent practice Chinese folk beliefs – which may include Confucian and Taoist doctrines and ritual traditions – or Buddhism, mostly of the Chinese variety.

According to official statistics for the year 2024 among the Hong Kong people who belong to an organised religion there are: over 1 million Buddhists, over 1 million Taoists, 1.04 million Protestants, 392,000 Catholics, 300,000 Muslims, 100,000 Hindus, 15,000 Sikhs, and other smaller communities. Hong Kong had a population of 7.53 million in 2024.

The great majority of the population mostly follow Chinese traditional religions, which include the worship of local gods and ancestors. Also, in many cases people avoid declaring their religious affiliation in surveys. Traditional Chinese religions were not encouraged during the British rule over Hong Kong, which strongly favoured Christianity. With the end of British colonial rule and the return of sovereignty over the city-state to China, there is a revival of Buddhist and Chinese folk religions.

== Main religions ==
=== Chinese folk beliefs ===
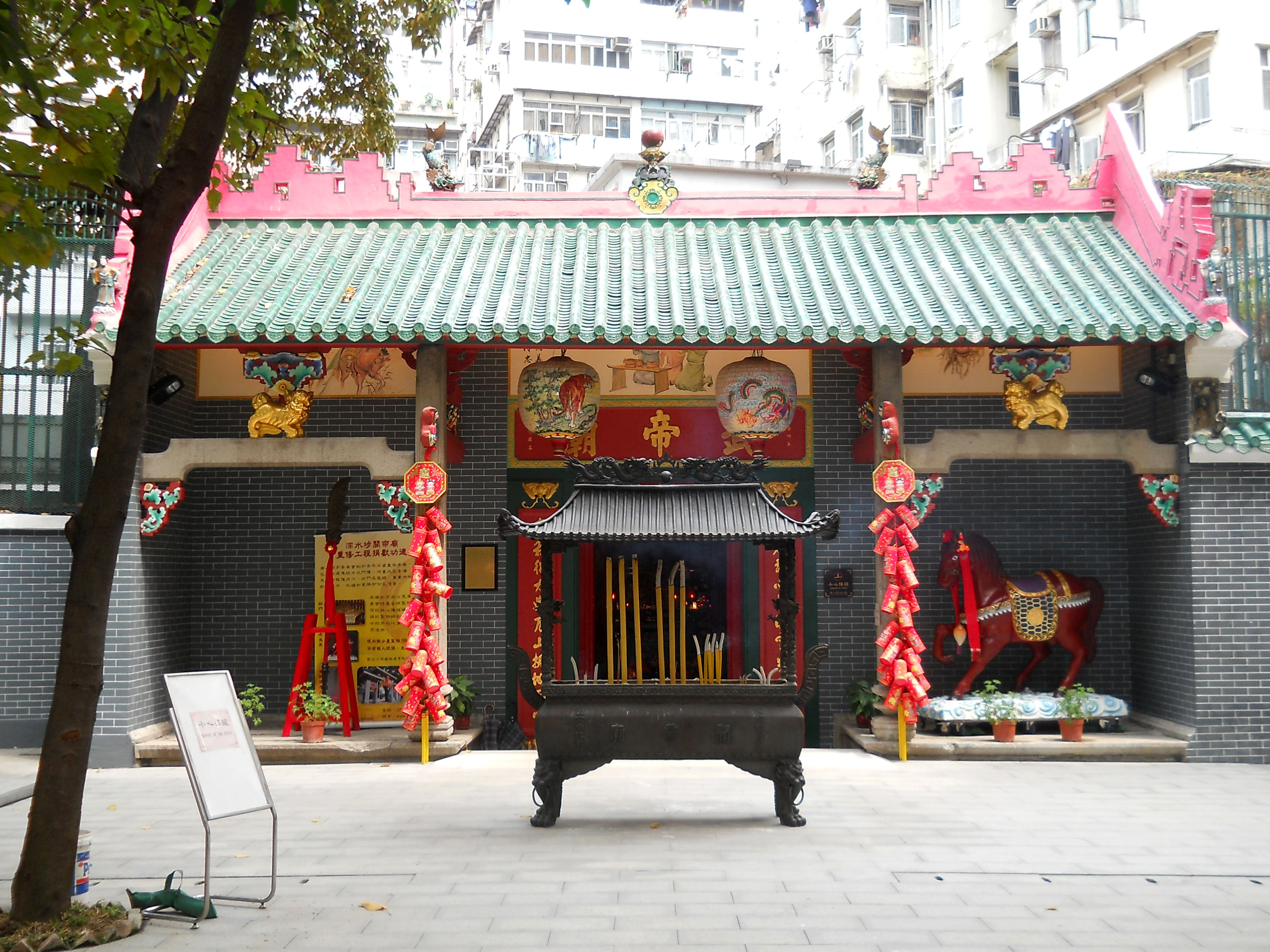
A small Temple dedicated to Kwan Tai in Sham Shui Po.

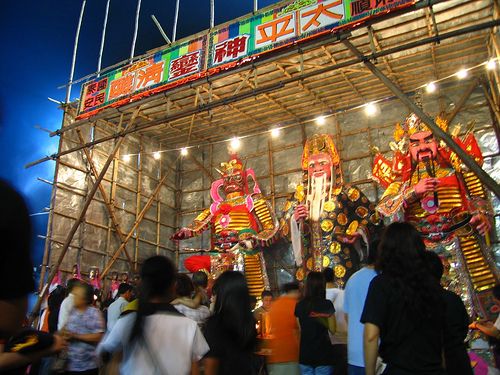
People honouring the Deities in a Taai Ping Ching Jiu celebration, a grand Taoist Festival.

Chinese folk religion was the indigenous religion of the Han Chinese. Its focus is the worship of the shen (神 "expressions", "gods"), that are the generative powers of nature, also including, in the human sphere, ancestors and progenitors of families or lineages, and divine heroes that made a significant imprinting in the history of the Chinese civilisation.

Traditionally, Hong Kong Chinese practised Daoist or folk religious traditions, along with some Buddhist practices and ancestral worship. In recent decades urban residential areas seldom have neighbourhood temples. Bosco argues that modern postindustrial life styles do not comport well with traditional practices. Many residents fail to recognize their practices as religious. Instead they regard many traditional practices and rituals, such as neighbourhood processions, as part of the unremarkable heritage representing traditional Hong Kong culture. Consequently, religion is often overlooked in Hong Kong. One result, says Bosco, is that diversity and tolerance are the characteristics that most mark the Hong Kong religious landscape.

=== Some of the Popular Chinese Deities ===
- Kwun Yam (觀音)
- Kwan Tai (關帝)
- Tin Hau (天后)
- Pak Tai (北帝)
- Wong Tai Sin (黃大仙)
- Che Kung (車公)
- Hung Shing Tai Wong (洪聖大王)
- Yeung Hau Tai Wong (楊侯大王)

=== Taoism ===
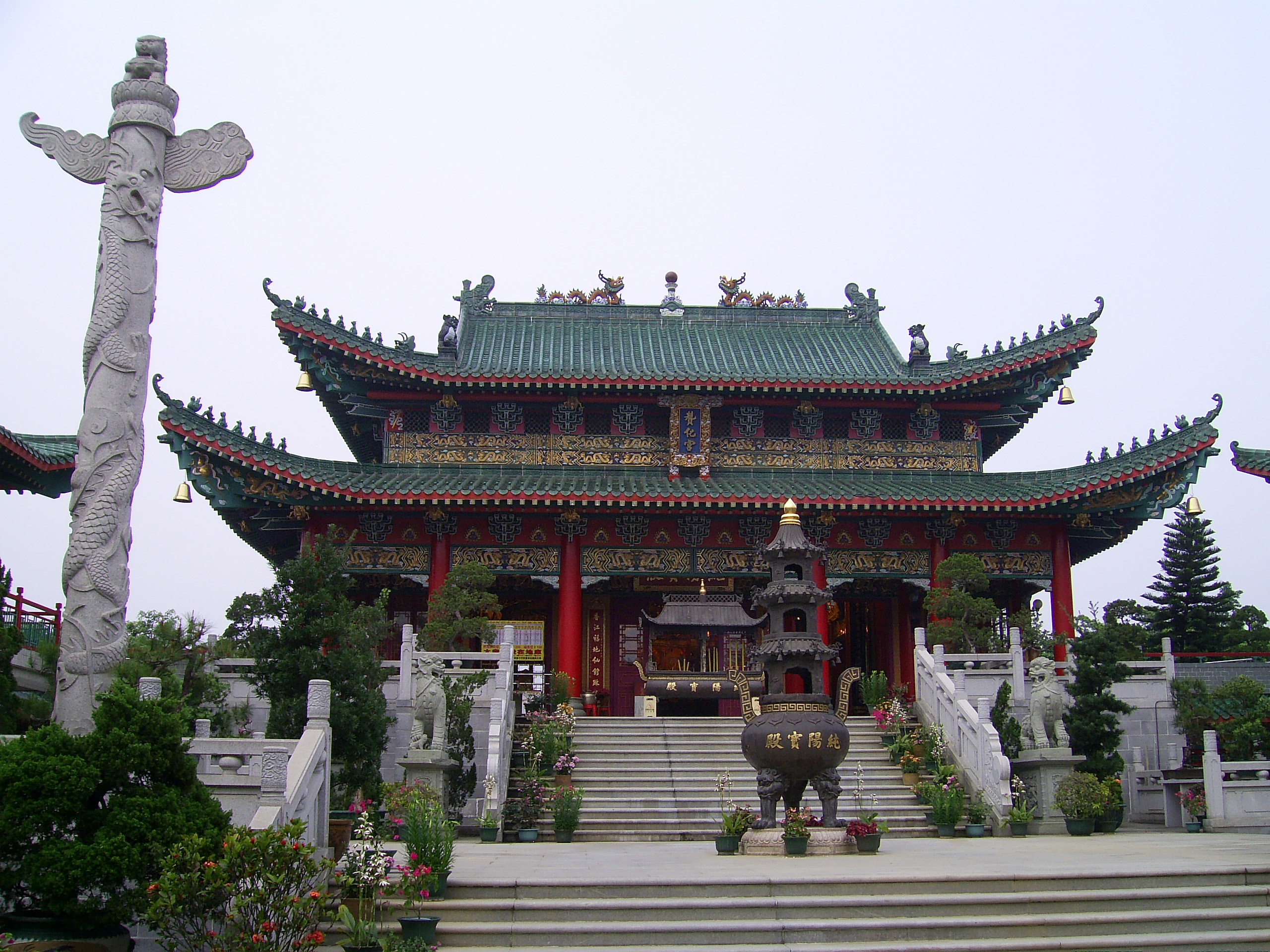
Main hall of the Wun Chuen Sin Koon, a Taoist temple in Hong Kong.

Taoism is a religious philosophy and ritual tradition that emphasises living in harmony and union with the Tao, the principle of nature. Notable Taoist temples in Hong Kong include the Wong Tai Sin Temple located in the Wong Tai Sin District in Kowloon. This popular temple is dedicated to Wong Tai Sin.

=== Confucian philosophy ===
Confucianism, based on the teachings of Confucius who lived in ancient China from 551 to 479 BC, is mainly a holistic moral code for human relations with emphasis on the importance of tradition and rites. The major festival of Confucianism in Hong Kong is Confucius' Birthday that falls on the 27th day of the eighth month of the lunar calendar. Confucians in Hong Kong established the Confucian Academy in 1930 and have been deeply involved in education and promoting Confucianism to the public. They run a number of local schools with an objective of promoting the teachings of Confucius.

=== Buddhism ===
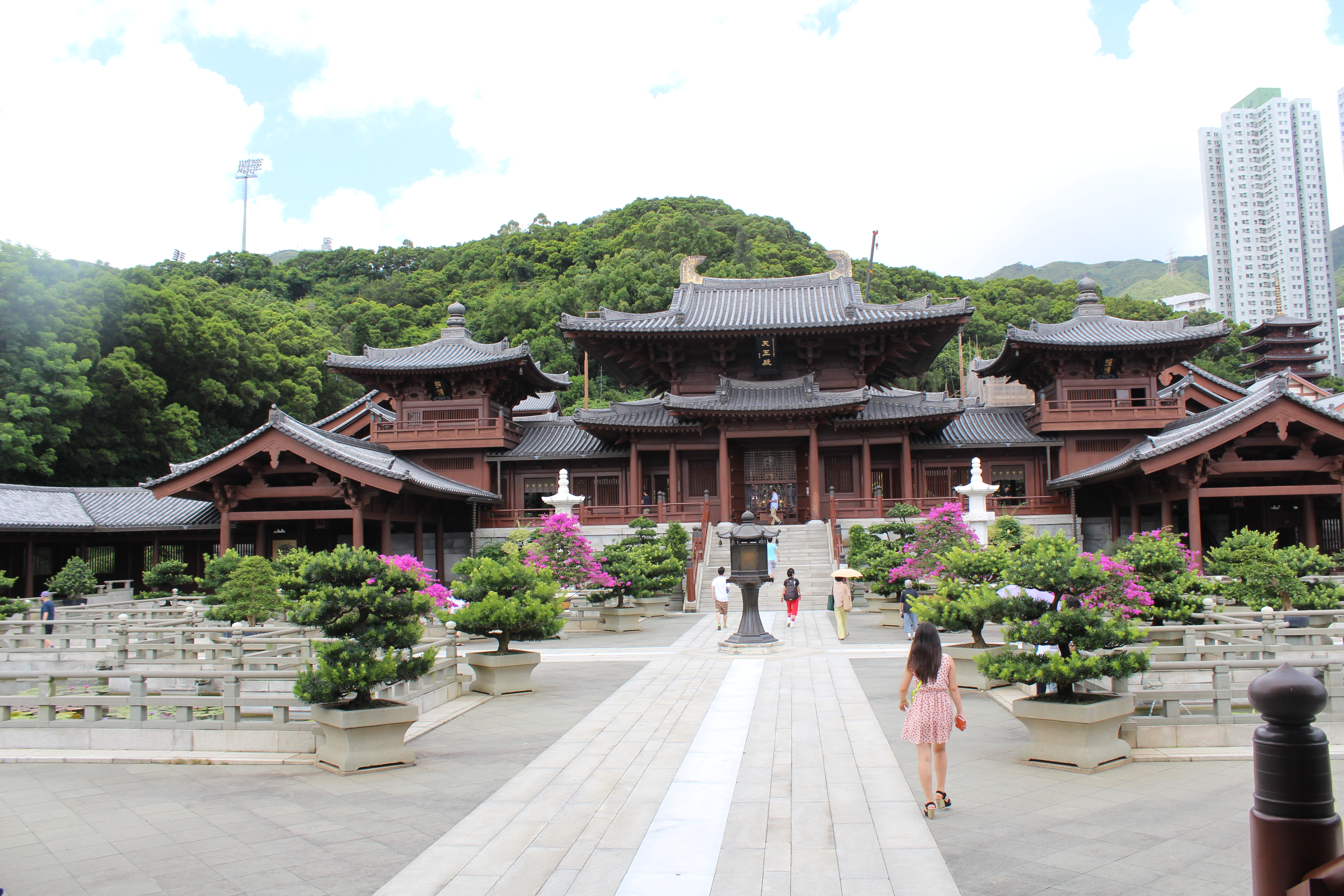
Main pavilions of the Chi Lin Nunnery.

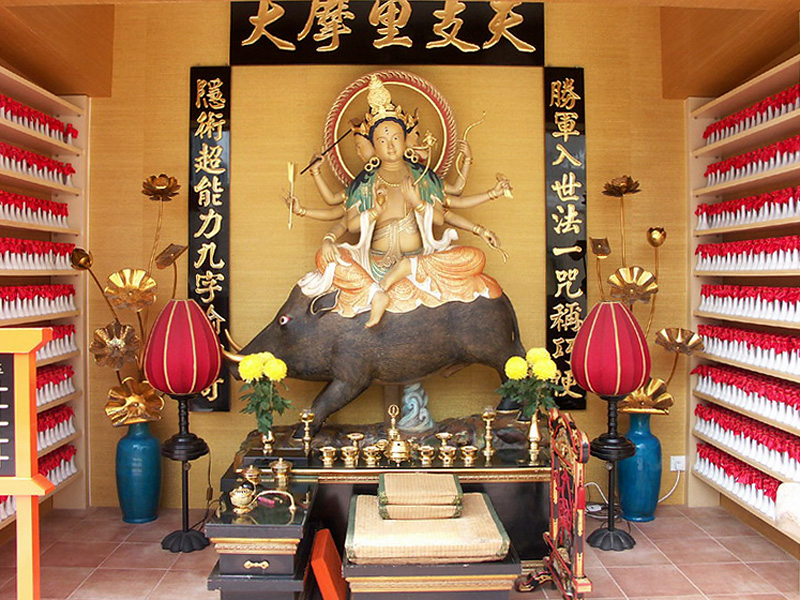
Statue of the goddess Marici, in an Esoteric Buddhist temple in Hong Kong.

Buddhism has a considerable number of adherents in Hong Kong. Among the most prominent Buddhist temples in the city there are the Chi Lin Nunnery in Diamond Hill, built in the Tang dynasty's architectural style; and the Po Lin Monastery on Lantau Island, famous for the outdoor bronze statue, Tian Tan Buddha, which attracts a large number of visitors during the weekends and holidays.

Buddhist organisations and temples in Hong Kong have long been involved in social welfare and education. The Buddhist Association of Hong Kong operates a dozen primary and secondary schools, and elderly homes as well as centres for youth and children in Hong Kong.

The leadership of mainstream Buddhists organisations have aligned themselves with the establishment in Hong Kong. For example, high-ranking Buddhist Association's executives have openly endorsed the re-election of the city's former Chief Executive Donald Tsang. Several of the association's members were on the Drafting Committee of the Basic Law.

Under the leadership of the former Chief Executive Tung Chee Hwa, the Hong Kong government formally recognised the influence of Buddhism in Hong Kong. In 1997 the government designated Buddha's Birthday as a public holiday, which replaced the Queen's birthday holiday. Tung himself is a Buddhist and participated in major, widely publicised Buddhist activities in Hong Kong and China.

Academic studies and research of Buddhism in Hong Kong have thrived over the past decades. The University of Hong Kong has a Centre of Buddhist Studies. The Chinese University of Hong Kong also has a Centre for the Study of Humanistic Buddhism.

The Soka Gakkai International has an estimated 50,000 members in Hong Kong. The local association is called Soka Gakkai International of Hong Kong (HKSGI) and it promotes peace, culture and education based on the principles of Nichiren Buddhism.

== Abrahamic religions ==
=== Christianity ===
Christianity is one of the most influential religions in Hong Kong. It gained influence partially due to its existence Hong Kong under British Crown rule from 1841 to 1997, and the work of many Western mission agencies from many countries. The Anglican Church held a nominal privileged status through the influence of the British colonial government.

After the transfer of sovereignty over Hong Kong to the China in 1997, governmental support from the Church of England was reduced. In China, the ruling Communist Party distrusts missions and humanitarian entities with international religious ties, like religious organizations with missionary connected objectives. China officially supports state atheism and views all religion including Christianity as potentially subversive. The government has in the past closed many churches and schools on the mainland and continues to practice religious persecution of minority religious groups. Since 2010, mainland China has gradually limited Hong Kong's Christian communities' ability to organize their churches in mainland China. Chinese officials have barred mainland residents from attending certain religious conferences in Hong Kong and sought increased oversight of mainland programs run by Hong Kong religious workers.

==== Catholicism ====
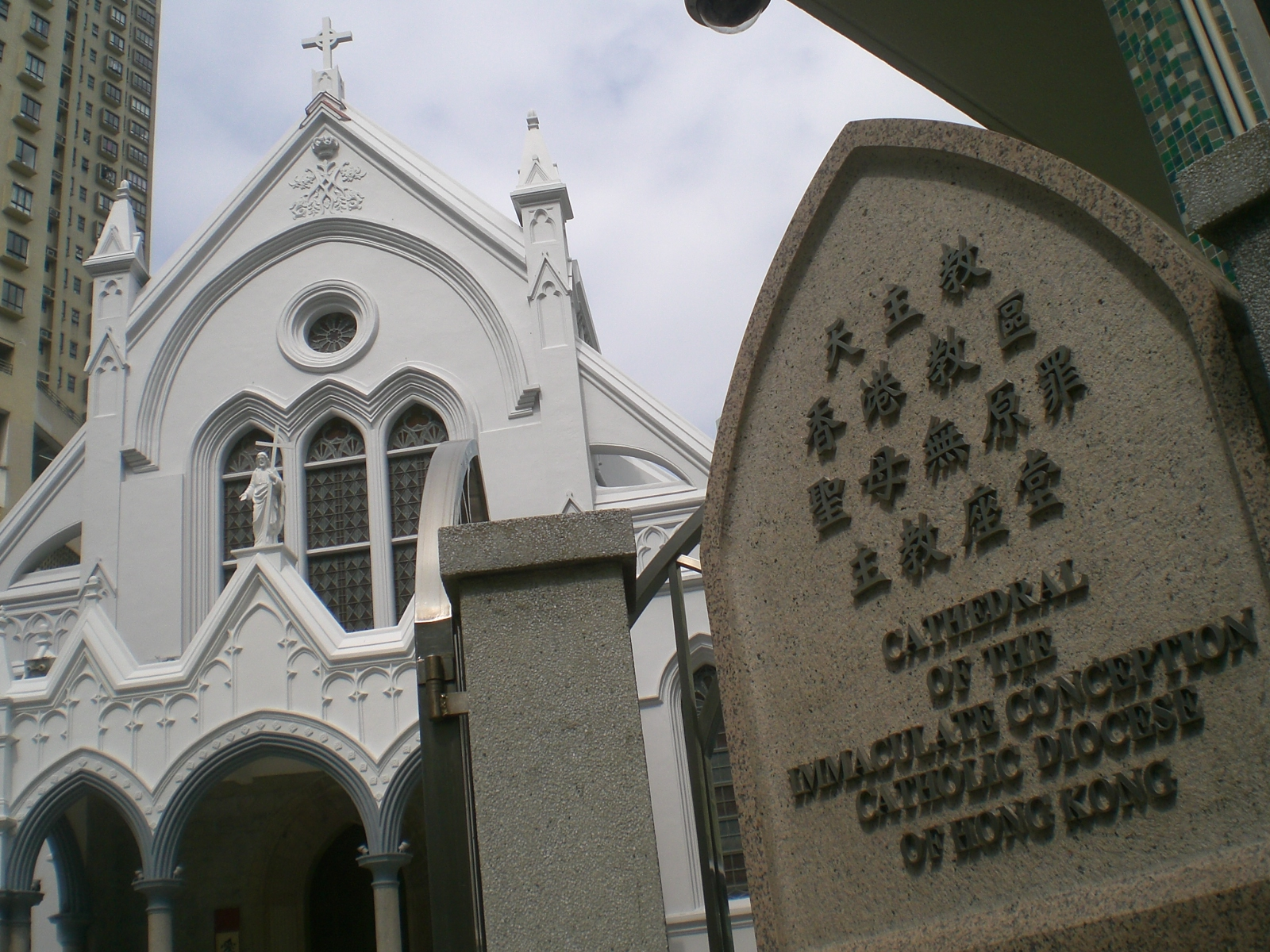
The Cathedral of the Immaculate Conception is the cathedral of the Catholic Church in Hong Kong.

The Catholic Church in Hong Kong was established as an apostolic prefecture in 1841 and as an Apostolic Vicariate in 1874. It became a diocese in 1946. About 392,000 Hong Kong people are Catholics as of 2024, many of them immigrants from the Philippines.

Masses are conducted in Cantonese, with around three-fifths of the parishes providing services in English and in Tagalog (for the Filipino community) in some cases.

The diocese has established its own administrative structure while maintaining close links with the Pope and other Catholic communities around the world. The assistant secretary-general of the Federation of Asian Bishops' Conferences has his office in Hong Kong. The diocese runs around 320 Catholic schools and kindergartens which have about 286,000 pupils. The Catholic Board of Education of Hong Kong assists this area. Medical and social services include about six hospitals, 15 clinics, 13 social centres, 15 hostels, 12 homes for the aged, 15 rehabilitation service centres and many self-help clubs and associations. Caritas—which runs many youth and social organisations and a hospital—is the official social welfare arm of the Catholic Church in Hong Kong.

To reach people through the media, the diocese publishes two weekly newspapers: Kung Kao Po and Sunday Examiner. In addition, the Diocesan Audio-Visual Centre produces tapes and films for use in schools and parishes and, overall, the Hong Kong Catholic Social Communications Office acts as an information and public relations channel for the diocese.

==== Protestantism ====
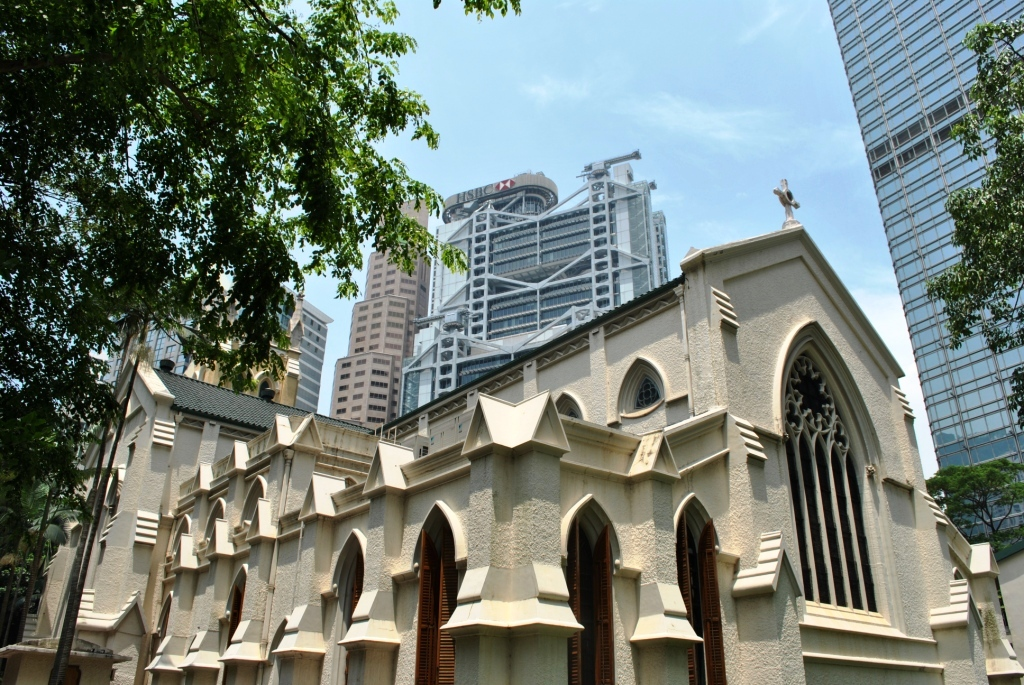
St. John's Cathedral is the cathedral of the Hong Kong Anglican Church.

The presence of the Protestant community dates back to 1841.

According to the data of HKSAR government, about 1,040,000 Protestants live in Hong Kong as of 2024; major denominations are Adventists, Anglicans, Baptists, Lutherans, the Christian and Missionary Alliance, the Church of Christ in China, Methodists, Pentecostals and the Salvation Army.

Protestant organisations operate three post-secondary institutions: the Chung Chi College at the Chinese University of Hong Kong, the Hong Kong Baptist University and Lingnan University. They run around 144 secondary schools, 192 primary schools, 273 kindergartens and 116 nurseries.

The Protestant community operates about 16 theological seminaries and Bible institutes, 16 publishing houses and 57 bookshops. They run seven hospitals, 18 clinics and 59 social service organisations, 74-day care centres, 17 children's homes, 35 homes for the elderly, 106 elderly centres, two schools for the blind and deaf, 47 training centres for the mentally handicapped and 15 camp sites.

Two weekly newspapers, The Christian Weekly and The Christian Times, are run by Protestants. Two ecumenical bodies facilitate cooperative work among the Protestant churches in Hong Kong. The older one, dating from 1915, is the Hong Kong Chinese Christian Churches Union. The other one is the Hong Kong Christian Council, formed in 1954.

==== Church of Jesus Christ of Latter-day Saints ====
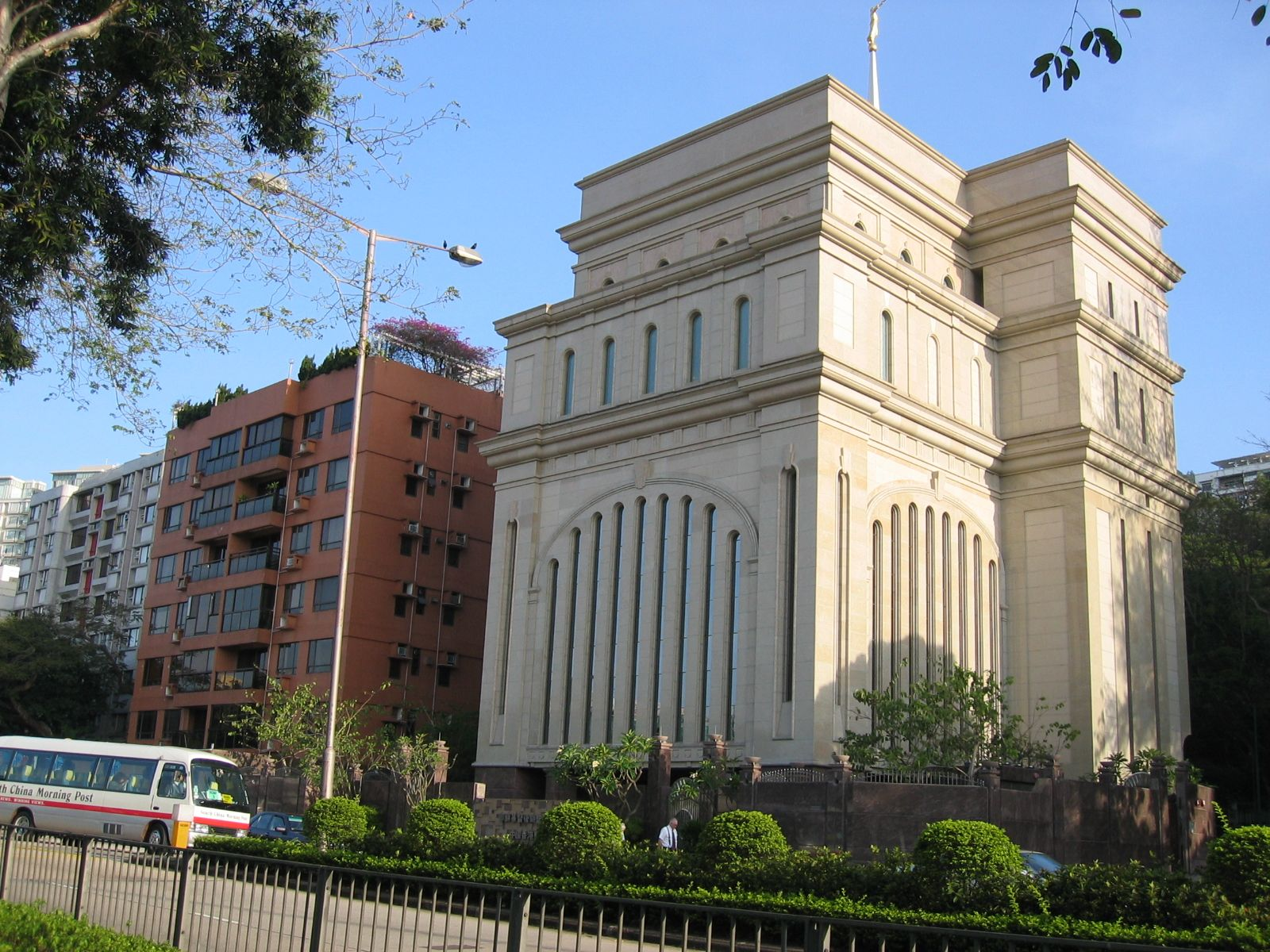
Hong Kong China Temple of The Church of Jesus Christ of Latter-day Saints.

The Church of Jesus Christ of Latter-day Saints had 24,496 recorded members in Hong Kong in 2025, as well as 27 active congregations

The LDS Church first sent missionaries to Hong Kong in 1853 but did not establish headquarters until 1949. In 1996 the Church completed the Hong Kong China Temple in Kowloon. In 2005 the Church Administration Building Hong Kong was opened. The geographical administrative area for the China Hong Kong LDS Mission includes all of China.

==== Orthodoxy ====
The Orthodox Metropolitanate of Hong Kong and Southeast Asia (Chinese: 正教會普世宗主教聖統香港及東南亞都主教教區) is the only church of Eastern Christianity in Hong Kong. It was set up in November 1996 by the decision of the Holy Great Synod of Constantinople. It is now under the spiritual jurisdiction of the Ecumenical Patriarchate of Constantinople.

=== Islam ===
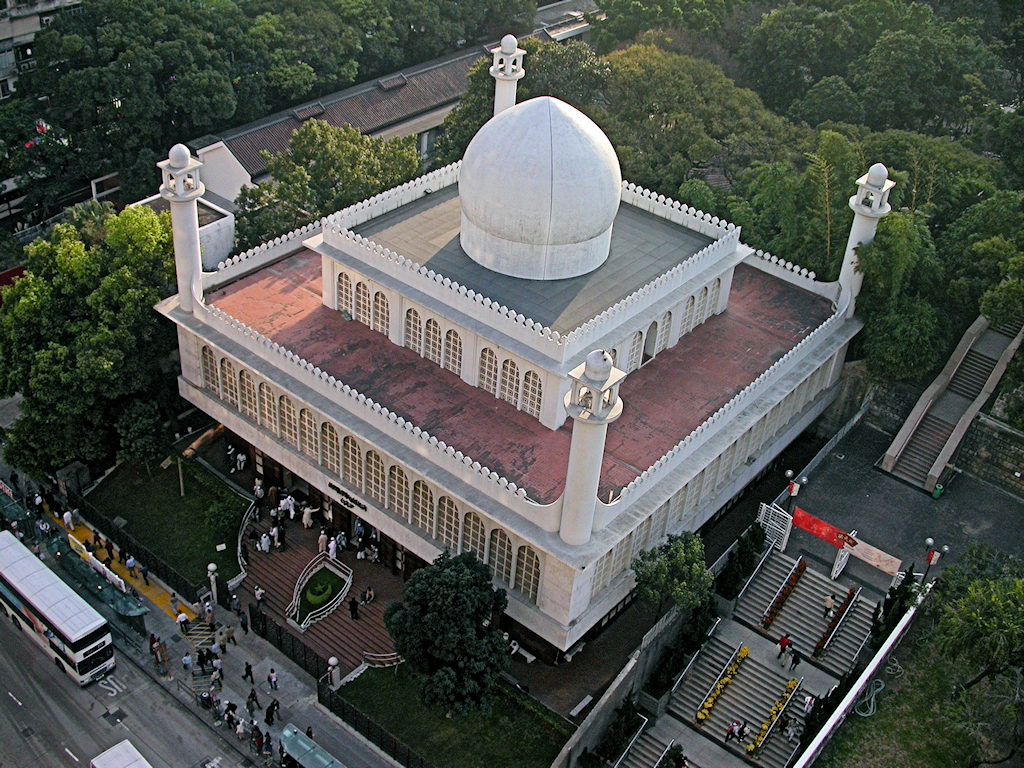
The Kowloon Masjid and Islamic Centre.

There were over 300,000 Muslims in Hong Kong in 2016, most of them are domestic workers from Indonesia and also South Asian Muslims. Four main mosques and seven madrasas are run by Khatme Nubuwwat Islamic Council, and are used daily for prayers. The Khatme Nubuwwat Islamic Council is located in Sham Shui Po, and is headed by Qari Muhammad Tayyab Qasmi.

The oldest mosque in the city is the Shelley Street Mosque, which was built in the 1840s and rebuilt in 1915. The Kowloon Masjid and Islamic Centre on Nathan Road opened in 1984. The Masjid and Islamic Centre on Oi Kwan Road in Wan Chai was opened in September 1981. The Cape Collinson Muslim Cemetery also has a mosque.

The Incorporated Trustees of the Islamic Community Fund of Hong Kong coordinates religious affairs and manages mosques and Muslim cemeteries in Hong Kong. The constituent bodies of the Trustees are the Islamic Union of Hong Kong, the Pakistan Association, the Indian Muslim Association and the Dawoodi Bohra Association.

Charitable work is carried out by the Muslim community, including financial aid to the needy, medical care, educational assistance, the provision of an Islamic kindergarten and assistance for the aged. In addition to the established Muslim community, there has been a sharp increase in the number of Indonesian migrant domestic workers, who numbered 123.000 at end 2008.

=== Judaism ===
With a history dating back to the 1840s, Hong Kong's Jewish community, comprising families from various parts of the world, worships at three main congregations. Daily services are held at the Ohel Leah Synagogue (Orthodox), Sabbath and festival services at the United Jewish Congregation of Hong Kong (Reform). Both are located in the same residential complex in Robinson Road. Daily services are also held at the Chabad Lubavitch shul based in the Mandarin Oriental, and in Kehilat Zion Hechal Ezra (Sephardi) in Kowloon.

The Ohel Leah Synagogue was built in 1901 on land given by Sir Jacob Sassoon and his family and includes a mikvah (ritual bath). There is also a Jewish cemetery in Happy Valley. The site next to the Ohel Leah Synagogue, now containing a residential complex, also houses the Jewish Community Centre which serves all three congregations. The centre offers its 400 member families and visiting Jewish guests kosher dining and banquets, cultural and recreational facilities as well as a specialist library covering all aspects of Judaica.

== Dharmic religions ==
=== Hinduism ===
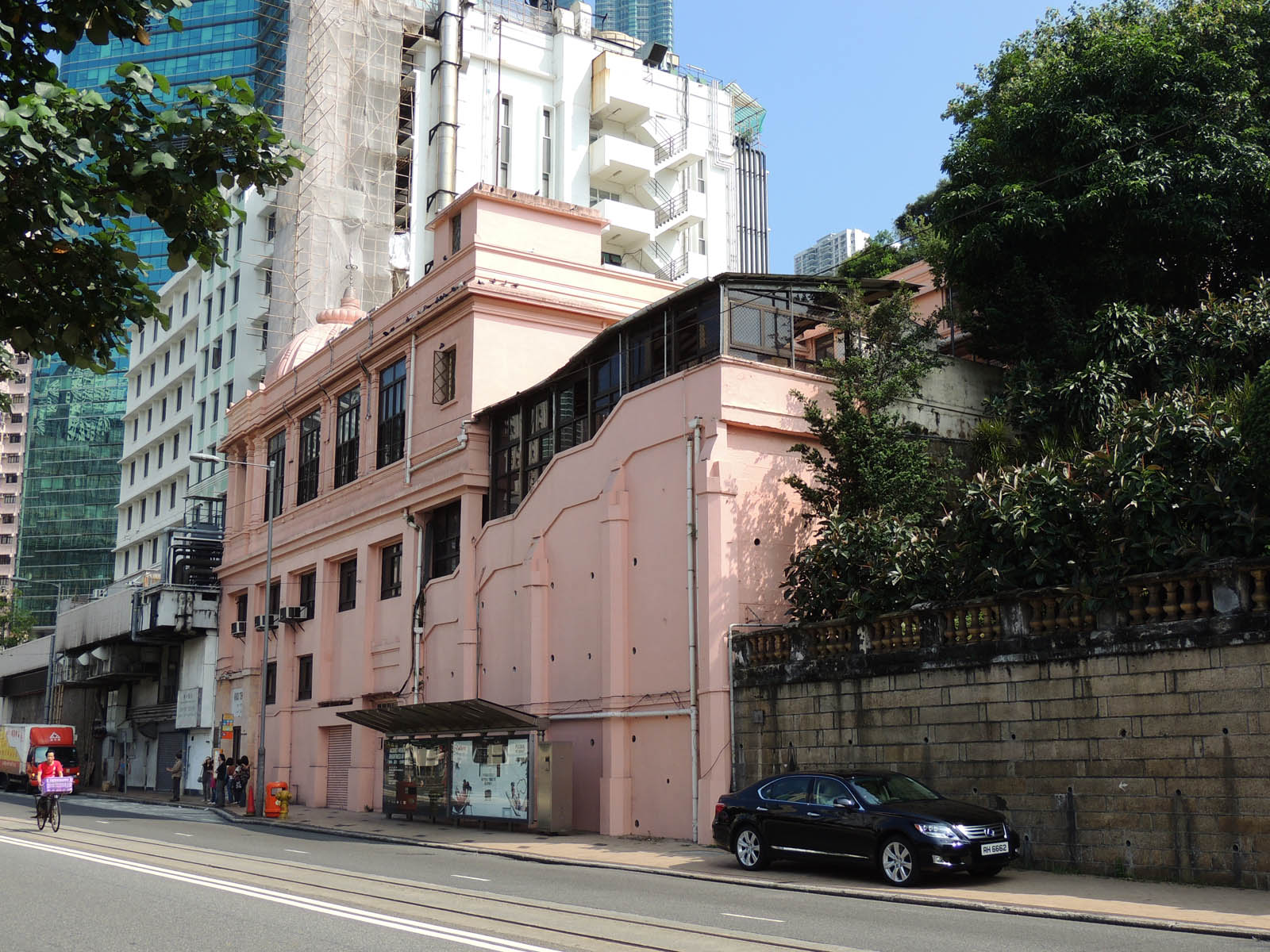
Hindu temple in Happy Valley.

There were 100,000 Hindus in Hong Kong in 2016, most of whom are immigrants from India, Nepal and Southeast Asian countries. The Hindu temple in Happy Valley is an important community centre for meditation and worship (puja). The International Society for Krishna Consciousness has a center in Hong Kong, established in 1981. Other temples are run by the Sai Baba and Chinmaya Mission groups. There is a Hindu crematorium in Cape Collins. Major religious holidays including Holi, Dussehra and Diwali are celebrated at the temples as well as in devotees' homes.

=== Jainism ===
There are about 500 Jains in Hong Kong, who immigrated to Hong Kong later than most other Indian groups. They originate mostly from the Indian states of Gujarat and Rajasthan. Their community grew rapidly during the 1980s. The Jains are most prominent in the diamond trading business. In 1996, members of the community founded a Jain temple, the Shree Hong Kong Jain Sangh.

=== Sikhism ===
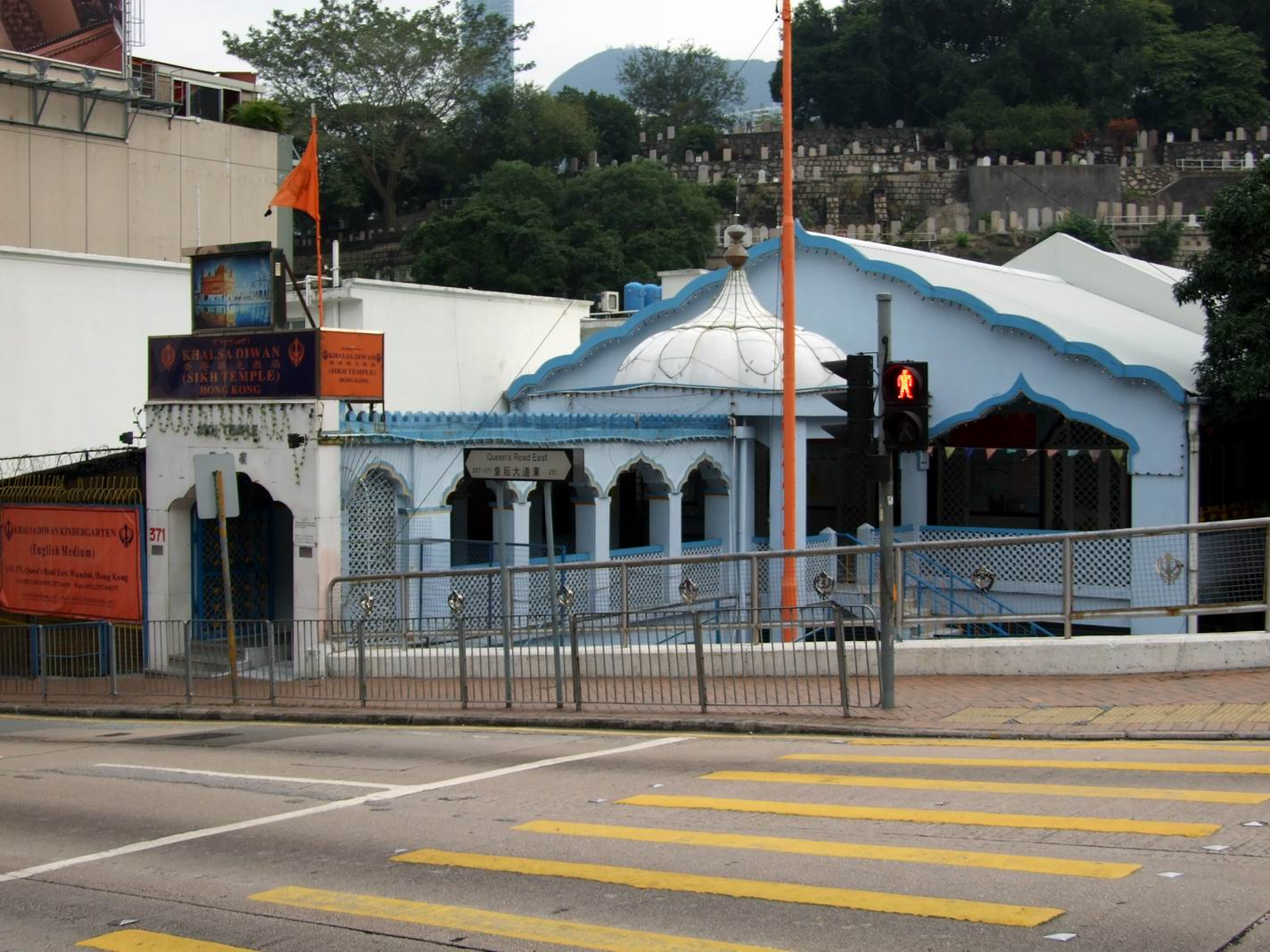
A Sikh temple in the city.

Like all Gurdwaras, Sikh temples in Hong Kong provide free meals and short-term accommodation to visitors. The main holydays observed are the birthdays of Guru Nanak (founder of the faith), Guru Gobind Singh (the 10th Guru), and Vasakhi (birthday of all Sikhs). Sikhs originally came to Hong Kong from Punjab – [Now India/Pakistan] as a part of the British Armed Forces in the 19th century. Hong Konger Sikhs in this century serve HKSAR in all sectors (Police, Business & Administration). Their faith teaches them to be loyal to the land where they live in or are born in, with an aim to contribute to the society. There are around 12,000 Sikhs in Hong Kong as of 2016.

== Other religions ==
=== Zoroastrianism ===
Hong Kong is home to a small Parsi Zoroastrian community numbering about 200. There is a Zoroastrian building in Causeway Bay with a small fire temple to serve the community.

== Traditional and religious festivals ==
There are five major festivals in the Chinese lunar calendar, with the Lunar New Year being the most important. Gifts and visits are exchanged among friends and relatives and children receive lai see, lucky money.

During the Ching Ming Festival in spring, ancestral graves are visited. In early summer (fifth day of the fifth lunar month), the Tuen Ng Festival is celebrated with dragon boat races and by eating cooked glutinous rice wrapped in lotus leaves.

The Mid-Autumn Festival falls on the 15th day of the eighth lunar month. Gifts of mooncakes, wine and fruit are exchanged and adults and children go into parks and the countryside at night with colourful lanterns. Chung Yeung is on the ninth day of the ninth lunar month, when many visit their ancestors' graves or hike up mountains in remembrance of an ancient Chinese family's escape from plague and death by fleeing to a mountain top.

Apart from the above traditional festivals, a number of important religious festivals, including Good Friday, Easter, Buddha's Birthday and Christmas, have been listed as public holidays.

== Estimated number of followers in Hong Kong ==
Estimated number of followers in Hong Kong by religion group
Region	2008	2009	2010	2011	2012	2013	2016	2024
Buddhists	> 1 million	> 1 million	> 1 million	> 1 million	around 1 million	around 1 million	> 1 million	> 1 million
Taoists	around 1 million	around 1 million	around 1 million	around 1 million	> 1 million	> 1 million	> 1 million	> 1 million
Protestant	320,000	320,000	480,000	480,000	480,000	close to 500,000	480,000	1.04 million
Catholics	350,000	350,000	353,000	363,000	363,000	368,000	379,000	392,000
Muslims	220,000	220,000	220,000	220,000	270,000	300,000	300,000	300,000
Hindu	40,000	40,000	40,000	40,000	40,000	40,000	100,000	100,000
Sikhs	10,000	10,000	10,000	10,000	10,000	10,000	12,000	15,000

== Freedom of religion ==
In 2023, the region was scored 3 out of 4 for religious freedom; it was noted that the score has gone down from previous years due to evidence that a crackdown on dissent has prompted some churches to self-censor their sermons and activities as well as harassment from the Hong Kong Youth Care Association. Other reports would describe freedom of religion within Hong Kong as "deteriorating" from repeated crackdowns, regulations and targeting of Catholics and Protestants from the Chinese Communist Party.

== See also ==
- Tin Hau temples in Hong Kong
- Cheung Chau Bun Festival
- Taai Ping Ching Jiu (太平清醮)
- Kau chim & Jiaobei
- Papier-mache offering shops in Hong Kong
- Hong Kong Government Lunar New Year kau chim tradition
- Chinese Temples Committee
- Culture of Hong Kong
- Chinese folk religion in Southeast Asia
- Places of worship in Hong Kong
- Religion in China
- Religion in Taiwan
- Religion in Macau
