= Samuel Chan Sze Ming =

- Samuel Chan
- Education: University of Nottingham; University of Warwick
- Occupations: Education consultant, columnist, television presenter
- Known for: Founder of Britannia; CEO of Nauticus Education Group

Chinese name
- Traditional Chinese: 陳思銘
- Simplified Chinese: 陈思铭
- Yale Romanization: Chàhn Sīmìhng
- Jyutping: Can4 Si1ming4

Samuel Chan Sze Ming (Chinese: 陳思銘) is a Hong Kong education consultant, columnist and television presenter. He founded Britannia and was appointed chief executive officer of Nauticus Education Group in 2025. He received the Entrepreneurial Award at the British Council's Study UK Alumni Awards in Hong Kong in 2017, and was named one of Prestige Hong Kong's "40 Under 40" in 2020.

== Early life and education ==
Chan was born in Hong Kong and went to the United Kingdom for school at the age of nine. He attended Gresham's Preparatory School, studied economics at the University of Nottingham and completed postgraduate study at the University of Warwick.

== Career ==
After returning to Hong Kong, Chan established Britannia, a consultancy specialising in applications to British schools and universities. The Hong Kong Brand Development Council records the company as having been established in 2012. Prestige credited the firm with helping to improve the education industry in Hong Kong.

In 2017, Chan received the Entrepreneurial Award at the British Council's Study UK Alumni Awards in Hong Kong. The council credited him with helping "to bring transparency to the UK school placement sector and standardise UK independent school applications through the introduction of the testing system, UKiset, to Hong Kong".

In October 2025, Gaw Capital Partners announced the formation of Nauticus Education Group, a Hong Kong-headquartered education holding company, and appointed Chan as its chief executive officer. Nauticus was formed to invest in education services, K-12 schools and early-childhood education across the Asia-Pacific and the Middle East.

Also in 2025, Chan was appointed honorary executive supervisor of True North International School in Hanoi, with a role in developing the school's international links and partnerships.

== Broadcasting and media ==
In 2019, Chan co-presented 男士堂, a men's lifestyle programme on Hong Kong Open TV, with Wong Yi-hing and Wong Sum-mei. Contemporary coverage described it as his first television hosting role.

In 2016, Britannia was the designated consultant for the TVB programme 嘩鬼上學去, arranging its filming in the United Kingdom.

== Writing and public engagements ==
From 2014, Chan wrote recurring columns and essays about British education, overseas study and British culture. Profiles list work in Sing Tao Daily, Headline Daily, the Hong Kong Economic Journal, Apple Daily, The Standard, the South China Morning Post and Ming Pao. His Apple Daily column was titled 戀上英識. He also contributed opinion essays to HK01 and wrote a recurring column for Fortune Insight from 2022 to 2025.

At the British Council's SPARK festival in January 2019, Chan moderated the panel "Promoting 21st century skills in the future workforce". In November 2024, he was a spotlight speaker at the QS Higher Ed Summit: Asia Pacific in Macau. In September 2026, he was a speaker at the Global Education Summit in Hong Kong, co-organised by HSBC Premier and SCMP Learn.

== Selected works ==
- 成就夢想英國升學101 (Achieving Dreams: 101 Guide to Studying in the UK), 2019
