= Shih Wing-ching =

Hong Kong businessman

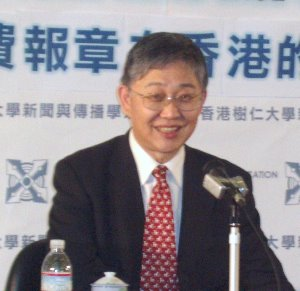
Shih Wing Ching in 2007

Shih Wing-ching (Chinese: 施永青; pinyin: Shī Yǒngqīng; Cantonese Yale: Shih1 Wing5 Ching1; born 17 March 1949 in Shanghai) is a Hong Kong businessman. His family is from Ningbo in Zhejiang province but he came to Hong Kong at an early age. In 1978 he established Centaline Property Agency Limited, which is now one of the largest property agencies in both Hong Kong and China.

Shih is chairman of the board of Governors of Hong Kong Sinfonietta, a Council Member of Oxfam Hong Kong, and a Member of the Housing Authority, as well as the Commercial Properties Committee and the Subsidized Housing Committee of the Authority. He is active in charity and philanthropy.

He founded, and continues to publish, the AM730 free daily newspaper. In January 2014, he revealed that many mainland companies were cancelling advertising with the paper, for its perceived anti-Beijing editorial stance.

On 30 July 2013, Shih was attacked in his car by two men with hammers, though he managed to drive away and did not suffer injury. He said at the time that he had no idea who or what motive might have been behind the attack.

Shih is a supporter of the Hong Kong Golf Club and has opposed development of public housing on land it leases from the government, saying "A feature of capitalism is a gap between rich and poor... If you try to erase the feature, say by taking away golf, then it's not capitalism, it's socialism" and also saying that is not what Hong Kong needs.

== Early life ==
Mr. Shih Wing Ching was raised in Shanghai and came to Hong Kong when he was two. In a tight worker's quarters the family of six squeezed. He began working after school at the age of eight, to raise family revenue.

He believed in the Marxist–Leninist ideology when in Secondary Four, and was thrown out of school for becoming a student protester. Since completing Secondary Five (since passing to three elementary schools and two high schools) he served for eight years as a teacher in a leftist community.

In 1978, he founded the Centaline Property Agency Limited, along with business partners.
