= Chinese Mail =

Chinese-language newspaper in Hong Kong

Chinese Mail 華字日報
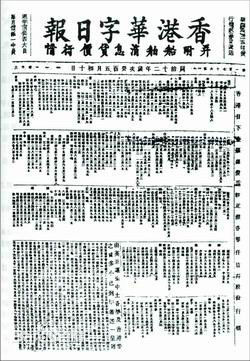
- Type: Daily newspaper
- Editor: Chen Aiting
- Founded: 17 April 1872
- Headquarters: Hong Kong

Chinese Mail (Chinese: 華字日報; pinyin: Huázì Rìbào) was a major Chinese language daily newspaper in Hong Kong. Despite being linked to the China Mail, the paper had its own editorial policy that rendered it more independent.

== Overview ==
Chinese Mail was founded in 1872 (some sources claim it was founded in 1864) and edited by Chen Aiting and his son. It declared itself to be "the first Chinese Newspaper ever issued under purely native direction". In 1874, the newspaper went into a rivalry with Universal Circulating Herald, leading to both the newspapers being published daily. By March 1874, Chinese Mail was being distributed to foreign countries such as the United States. The paper guaranteed at least 1000 copies in circulation.

The newspaper became independent from the China Mail in 1919.

Chinese Mail provided news on Guangzhou due to the close proximity of Guangzhou to Hong Kong. Due to its location in Hong Kong, too, it was free from censorship from Guangzhou.

In 1941, when the Imperial Japanese Army captured Hong Kong, the newspaper stopped publication. Although many other major Chinese-language newspapers managed to make a recovery after the occupation, Chinese Mail did not.
