= Am730 =

Free newspaper in Hong Kong

AM730

- Type: Daily newspaper
- Format: Tabloid
- Owner: Shih Wing Ching
- Editor: Lo Kok Luen (盧覺麟)
- Founded: 30 July 2005; 20 years ago
- Language: Traditional Chinese
- Headquarters: 22/F Block B, Southmark, 11 Yip Hing Street, Wong Chuk Hang
- Website: www.am730.com.hk

Am730 is a free daily Chinese language newspaper published in Hong Kong, the third with the prior two being Headline Daily and Metropolis Daily. Shih Wing-ching, chairman of Centaline Holdings, a property agency, is the founder of the newspaper.

== Overview ==
Owned and operated by AM730 Media Limited, am730 launched its first publication on 30 July 2005. It had been scheduled to be launched in September, but it was rescheduled to 30 July to keep up with one of its competitors, Headline Daily, which was launched on 12 July 2005, and for convenient coincidence that the date of 30 July (730) corresponded with the name of the newspaper. Two hundred thousand copies of am730 were issued at its first publication and its current circulation volume is around 300,000 copies daily.

The name of the newspaper is intended to suggest a fresh approach towards the methodology of naming newspapers. It does not incorporate the term "daily" because this word reflects the conventional way of naming a news journal. The name literally states the newspaper's aim to distribute the publication during rush hour, which is approximately 7:30am. According to Shih, the newspaper is tailored to young people.

In January 2014, Shih revealed that many mainland companies were cancelling advertising with the paper, for its perceived anti-Beijing editorial stance.

== Language and style ==
Headline Daily, a newspaper which belongs to Sing Tao, is the primary competition for am730. Shih admits that Headline Daily has more resources than the privately investigated am730 because of its attachment to Sing Tao Daily, but that dependence on Sing Tao would harm the independence of its organization.

== Editorial team ==
Currently, the editorial team consists of 50 people. Key staff are :

- President: Alan Lo
- Vice-President: Danny Fung and Ricky Lo
- Sales and Marketing Director: Ray Lee
- Associate Managing Editor: Dominic Leung
- Marketing Manager: Agnes Chen
- Chief Reporter: Kenneth Dai
- General Chief Reporter: Ray Tsang
- Photography Director: Edmond Wong
- Arts Director: Spring Kwok

== Operations ==
The initial launch of the newspaper cost up to HK$100 million. It was Shih's private investment. At the first stage, working capital was just HK$50 million; another HK$50 million will be invested if the operation proves successful. Shih Wing-ching expects that revenue and expenditures will be balanced after a year of publication.

As a free newspaper, the major operational revenue is gained from commercial advertisements. After the first month of publication, the revenue gained from commercial advertisements was HK$100 million while am730 still needed to bear HK$100 million to HK$200 million in losses every day. The advertising rates in am730 are estimated to be HK$24,000 – HK$30,000, 30% to 40% lower than Metropolis Daily's rates of HK$32,000 to HK$40,000. This is a strategic action to attract more advertisements.

From July 2013, under a six-year contract, the paper is printed by the South China Morning Post Group.

=== Distribution points ===
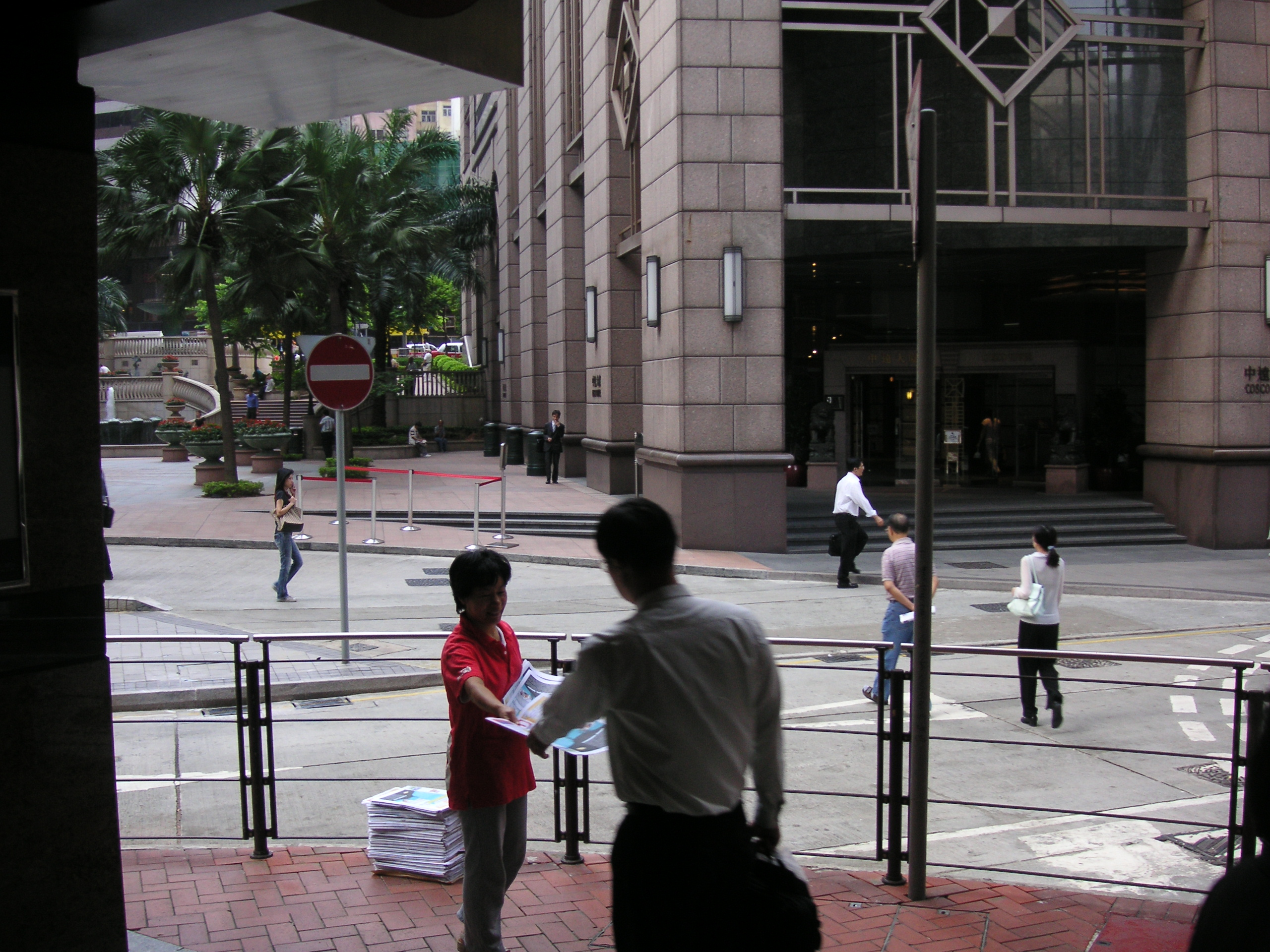
am730 being distributed in Sheung Wan, near the Sheung Wan MTR entrance.

am730 is distributed from Mondays to Fridays (except public holidays) at around 287 locations. Distribution locations include railway stations along the East Rail line and West Rail line, the entrances of Mass Transit Railway (MTR) stations, private residential areas, and many points in the Central business district (or CBD).

Due to limited human resources and the specific target group of am730, early distribution points were not as efficient. Its main focus is now in the commercial districts of Hong Kong such as Central, Wan Chai and Tsim Sha Tsui.

== Other services ==
=== Online papers ===
am730 is also accessible online. Besides viewing the most recent issue, readers can also view archived issues of am730 online. The e-paper is formatted in such a way that it resembles the actual printed paper.

== See also ==
- Media in Hong Kong
- Newspapers of Hong Kong
- Free daily newspapers
