= Sunday Examiner =

- Type: Weekly newspaper
- Format: Print, online
- Owner: Roman Catholic Diocese of Hong Kong
- Founded: 1946
- Language: English
- Website: examiner.org.hk

The Sunday Examiner is an English newspaper owned and operated by the Roman Catholic Diocese of Hong Kong. The newspaper is published weekly on every Sunday in the Catholic parishes in Hong Kong. The newspaper, along with Kung Kao Po, are the official publications that are published by the Diocese.

== See also ==
- Media in Hong Kong
- List of newspapers in Hong Kong
- Newspaper Society of Hong Kong
- Hong Kong Audit Bureau of Circulations
