= Daily Press (Hong Kong) =

The Hong Kong Daily Press (3rd May,1886)

The Daily Press (Chinese: 每日雜報, also 孖剌報, 孖剌西報, and 孖剌沙西報), also The Hong Kong Daily Press, was an English-language newspaper in Hong Kong, published from 1857 for about 80 years. Founded and edited by George M Ryder, it was the first daily newspaper in Hong Kong. In 1858, Yorick Jones Murrow, a tenacious Welshman born in 1817, took over the newspaper and he inaugurated the Chinese-language paper Hongkong Chinese and Foreign News (Chinese: 香港中外新報), published three times per week.The Chinese paper eventually became Wah Kiu Yat Po. Murrow led the paper on fearless attacks on the Colonial administration, leading ultimately to his imprisonment on a charge of libel. He relinquished his role as editor in 1867 but remained its proprietor until his death in 1884.

It operated in a building at the junction of Wyndham Street and Glenealy, Central District, for some years, but had left no later than 1911, when the building was converted to the Wyndham Hotel.

== See also ==
- List of newspapers in Hong Kong
