= Metro Daily =

First free Hong Kong news paper

Metro Daily 都市日報
- Cover of Metro Daily on 2 June 2009
- Type: Daily free newspaper
- Format: Tabloid
- Owner: 蕭作利
- Founded: 15 April 2002
- Ceased publication: 18 December 2019
- Language: Traditional Chinese with news digest pages in Simplified Chinese and English
- Circulation: 978,786 (2005)
- Price: Free
- Website: http://www.metrohk.com.hk/

Metro Daily (traditional Chinese: 都市日報; simplified Chinese: 都市日报; Jyutping: dou1 si5 jat6 bou3) was the Hong Kong edition of Metro, which publishes free newspapers around the world with 25 editions in 16 countries in 14 languages. It was the first free newspaper in Hong Kong.

The Hong Kong version was first launched on 15 April 2002; it is distributed for free in the racks located in 49 Mass Transit Railway (MTR) stations except the Airport Station.

According to the Hong Kong Audit Bureau of Circulations in September 2002, the daily circulation of the newspaper was 302,197 copies, making it the third largest daily newspaper in Hong Kong. The paper is distributed from Monday to Friday (except for public holidays), by hand or from the newspaper stands in 49 MTR stations and 11 other key central locations, such as big shopping malls owned by MTR Corporation Limited like Paradise Mall, Telford Plaza, and Luk Yeung Galleria.

Though around one tenth size of other newspapers printing local first-hand news reported by fresh journalists, its main news sources are actually the television, radio news, press releases and wired news. Metro Daily is for the most part published in Chinese, with an English language international section. Despite being a tabloid, i.e. a minute-sized newspaper giving the stories in a condensed form, it includes many sections and is very rich in content. These sections include:

- local news (including one page written in Simplified Chinese);
- Chinese news;
- international news;
- finance;
- sports;
- entertainment;
- side stories;
- English news digest;
- editorial column;
- television program schedule; and
- film section.

Readers can read the on-line edition of Metro all over the world by simply registering as users at its official site, and it is totally free. Besides, there is also a club called "Club Metro" offering discounts in films, sports and travel to its members.

== See also ==
- Headline Daily
- am730
- Metro International
- Media in Hong Kong
- Newspapers of Hong Kong
- Free daily newspaper
