= The China Mail =

English-language newspaper in Hong Kong (1845–1974)

The China Mail (Chinese: 德臣西報, also 中國郵報 and 德臣報) was an English-language newspaper published in Hong Kong from 1845 to 1974, making it the longest-lived of any Hong Kong newspaper. The head office was in Wellington Street.

== History ==
The China Mail was created as a weekly by Andrew Shortrede in 1845. In 1858, Andrew Dixson became the owner of the publication, followed by James Kemp in 1863, Nicholas B. Denny in 1866, Charles A. Saint in 1867 (the year the newspapers became a daily), George Murray Bain in 1872, and by China Mail Co. in 1906.

From 1845 to 1853, and then from 1855 to 1858, the China Mail was the exclusive publisher of the government gazette. Early versions of the journal published mainly advertising and government notices, along with featured articles. The China Mail had a pro-government, pro-China, and pro-United States stand. During John Pope Hennessy's governorship of Hongkong, the China Mail adopted a hostile editorial line against him.

The publication of The China Mail was suspended from October 1941 to August 1945.

In October 1969, the front page of the China Mail covered the prediction of a local astrologer claiming that Mao Zedong may die between November 11 and December 7.

When the closure was announced, the Hong Kong Journalists Association, headed by Jack Spackman, organised a sit-in at the China Mail's offices to protest the number of journalists being sacked, some after many years' service, with no compensation. This was the first protest of its kind in Hong Kong to protect the rights of workers. Most of the European journalists and some of the local Chinese journalists were moved to the South China Morning Post (including Mail editor Alfred Cunningham), which owned 80% of the China Mail, or managed to obtain employment on other publications.

At the time of its closure the acting editor was David Smith, who had joined the paper in 1971 as the sports editor.

== Description ==
The China mail Group oversaw the publication of 10 newspapers : The China Mail (1845-1911), Overland China Mail (1848-1909), Dixson's Hongkong Gazette (1850), Dixson's Hongkong Recorder (1850-1859), Hongkong Recorder (1859), Hongkong Shipping List (1855-1857), Hongkong Shipping List and Commercial Intelligencer (1857-1862), Evening Mail and Hongkong Shipping List (1862), Evening Mail (1863-1867), Chin-ship pien-lu (1864), Chung-wai hsin-wen ch'i-jih pao (1871-1872).

== See also ==
- List of newspapers in Hong Kong
