= Career Times =

Recruitment publication

- Owner(s): Hong Kong Economic Times Holdings
- Founded: 1997
- Language: English
- Circulation: 210,000 copies (weekly)

Career Times is an English-language recruitment weekly for business executives in Hong Kong. It has been published by Hong Kong Economic Times Holdings every Friday since 1997. The online version, CareerTimes, was launched in 1999 as a job search and recruitment site offering job listings from companies such as Cheung Kong Holdings, HSBC, Hutchison Whampoa, Hang Seng Bank, and their subsidiaries. The site also offers career-related resources that are helpful to new graduates and prospective government employees, and information for employers and human resources professionals.
