= Wah Kiu Yat Po =

Hong Kong newspaper

Wah Kiu Yat Po Overseas Chinese Daily News 華僑日報
- Type: Daily newspaper
- Format: Broadsheet
- Founder: Shum Wai-yau
- Founded: 5 June 1925; 101 years ago
- Ceased publication: 12 January 1995; 31 years ago
- Political alignment: Pro-Kuomintang
- Language: Chinese (in Traditional Chinese characters)
- Headquarters: Tong Chong Street, Quarry Bay, Hong Kong
- Country: British Hong Kong

Wah Kiu Yat Po, or Overseas Chinese Daily News (Chinese: 華僑日報), was a Chinese-language newspaper based in British Hong Kong. It began with the Chinese version of The Daily Press in 1858. In 1925, the Chinese paper was eventually acquired by Shum Wai-yau (Chinese: 岑維休), a journalist, and the Shum family took control of the company. It was renamed to Wah Kiu Yat Po following the acquisition and published under that name until the press closed down in 1995.

== History ==
The newspaper was the successor of the Chinese version of The Daily Press, known as Heong-Kong Shun-Tow Fo-Kai Chi (Chinese: 香港船頭貨價紙) in 1857. A year later, in 1858, it became a daily paper under the name Hongkong Chung Ngoi San Po (Chinese: 香港中外新報) and its name was further shorten to Chung Ngoi San Po (Chinese: 中外新報) around some time between late 19th and early 20th century. Later, it was published under the name Chinese General Merchants Daily (Chinese: 香港華商總會報) from 1919 to 1923 when the Chinese General Chamber of Commerce and Daily Press co-owned the company. The contract later ended and the Chinese General Chamber of Commerce published the paper on its own. In 1925, it was sold to Shum Wai-yau due to its high operating costs. It was renamed Wah Kiu Yat Po and began publishing on 5 June 1925.

In December 1941, the Japanese occupation of Hong Kong began. Wah Kiu Yat Po was one of the few newspapers that were allowed to continue publishing. The newspaper used different writing strategies to pass censorship review by the Japanese military government and secretly convey anti-Japanese messages. On 1 April 1945, Wah Kiu Man Po (Chinese: 華僑晚報; lit. 'Overseas Chinese Evening News') was founded. The last issue of the newspaper was on 1 April 1988.

In 1985, the founder Shum Wai-yau died. His son Shum Choi-sang was unwilling to keep running the newspaper. Therefore, in December 1991, the newspaper was sold to South China Morning Post. The Post sold it again in January 1994 to Heung Shu-fai, who improved its sales. However, it still closed down for financial reasons on 12 January 1995. Governor Chris Patten said he was very sad and that the paper had been famous for its integrity and commitment to community values.

The first issue of Hongkong Yearbook of 1948

And besides, the press also published Hongkong Yearbook (Chinese: 香港年鑑) annually from 1948, reviewing the various aspect of life and business in Hong Kong and listing various businesses and organisations of the city.

== Archives ==
The Hong Kong Public Libraries keeps its archive online, with issues from 1947 to 1991, though some issues and pages omitted.
