= Kung Kao Po =

Catholic weekly newspaper in Hong Kong

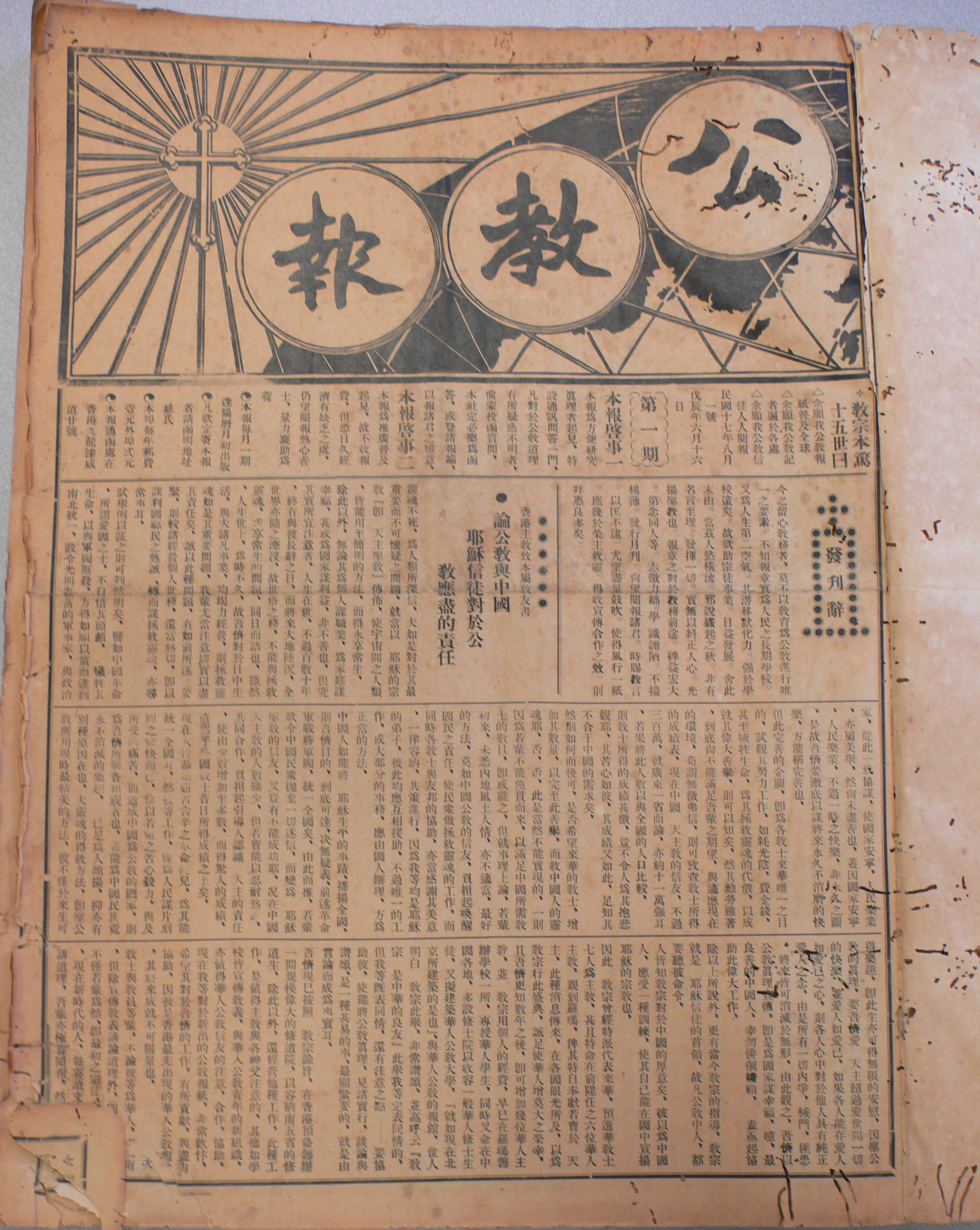
- Front page of 1 August 1928, when Kung Kao Po was first published
- Type: Weekly newspaper
- Format: Compact
- Owner: Roman Catholic Diocese of Hong Kong
- Publisher: Roman Catholic Diocese of Hong Kong
- Founded: August 1, 1928; 97 years ago
- Political alignment: Pro-democracy
- Language: Chinese language (traditional)
- Headquarters: 11/F, Catholic Diocese Centre, 16 Caine Road, Central, Hong Kong Island
- Country: Hong Kong
- Sister newspapers: Sunday Examiner
- Website: kkp.org.hk
- Free online archives: kkp.catholic.org.hk

Kung Kao Po
- Traditional Chinese: 公教報
- Simplified Chinese: 公教报
- Literal meaning: Catholic newspaper
Transcriptions
Standard Mandarin
- Hanyu Pinyin: Gōng Jiào Bào
Yue: Cantonese
- Jyutping: gung1 gaau3 bou3
- IPA: [kʊ́ŋ kāːu pōu]

Kung Kao Po (traditional Chinese: 公教報; simplified Chinese: 公教报; lit. 'Catholic newspaper') is a Chinese-language weekly newspaper published on every Friday in Hong Kong. First circulated on 1 August 1928, the newspaper, owned and operated by the Roman Catholic Diocese of Hong Kong, is one of the oldest in Hong Kong.

Featuring local and international church-related news, Kung Kao Po's coverage also includes a wide variety of topics, from education to health. A kid-oriented supplement (Joyful Youth) is attached in every issue of the newspaper. Pastoral letters from the Bishop of Hong Kong in different ecclesiastical seasons and special pastoral letters regarding certain issues are also published in Kung Kao Po.

Despite being sold only in Catholic parishes of Hong Kong and distributed across hospitals of Hong Kong, Kung Kao Po is also available through subscription, making it available to all Chinese-speaking Roman Catholics abroad. Kung Kao Po's back issues are available online through its former website, which preserves issues published before 25 September 2011. Audio edition of the newspaper, recorded in Cantonese, is also available in MP3 format in the website.

Kung Kao Po has become known to the general populace of Hong Kong in recent years, owing to its editorials and columns, often cited by Hong Kong's mainstream media outlets, on politics and social issues.

== See also ==
- Sunday Examiner
