= Filipino Globe =

- Type: Newspaper
- Format: Tabloid, full-color
- Publisher: Reggie Amigo
- Founded: 2006; 19 years ago
- Headquarters: Hong Kong
- Website: filglobe.com

Filipino Globe is a publication that caters to Filipino expatriates around the world. It was founded by Hong Kong–based journalist Reggie Amigo and communications executive Therese Necio-Ortega.

Launched on November 11, 2006, it consists of a print edition, published out of Hong Kong, and an online edition.

== Format ==
Filipino Globe is published in a tabloid format. All pages have full-color options.

== Sections ==
1. City (news and views in and around Hong Kong and Macau)
2. National (news and views from the Philippines)
3. World (news and views from around the world, mainly focused on Filipino expatriates)
4. Focus (editorial, commentary and community news)
5. Life and Times (features, livelihood, health and beauty, showbiz, sports, horoscope, comics, events diary and consular services information)

== Digital version ==
The online edition of Filipino Globe includes content from the newspaper as well as current news, which is updated regularly. Recently, a digital version of the newspaper was added, enabling visitors to flip and read the pages as they appear in print.
