= Centaline Property Agency =

Centaline Property Agency Limited 中原地產代理有限公司
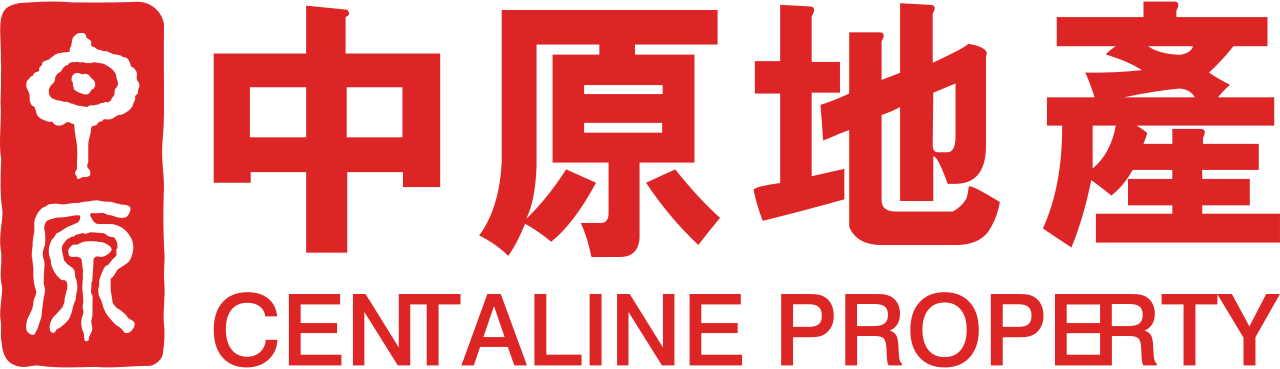
- Type: privately owned company
- Industry: Real estate agent
- Founded: 1978
- Headquarters: Hong Kong
- Area served: Mainland China, Hong Kong, Macau
- Key people: Chairman: Mr. Shih Wing-ching
- Number of employees: 40,000
- Parent: Centaline Holdings
- Website: Centaline Property

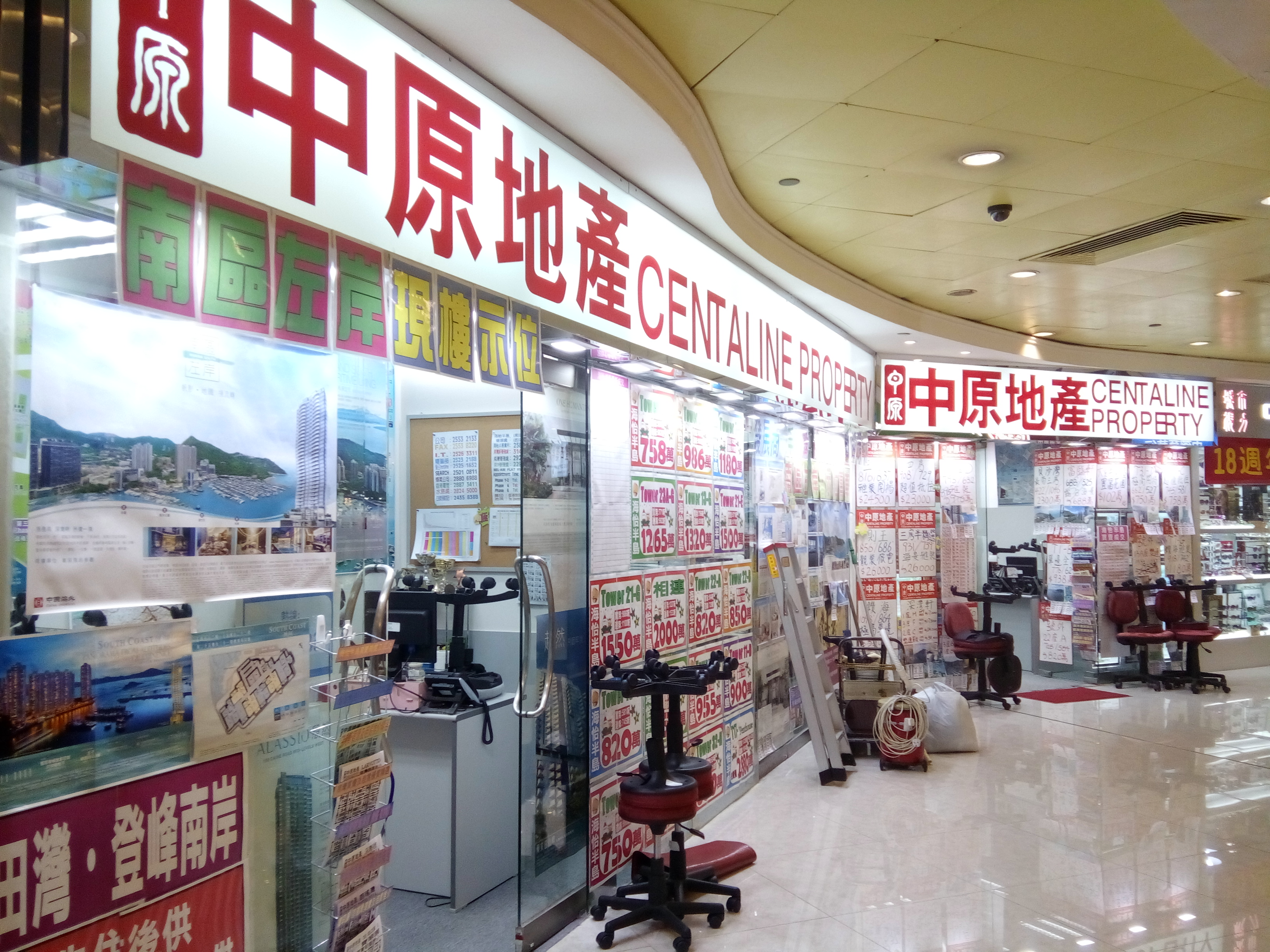
Centaline Property branch in Marina Square West Centre, South Horizons

Centaline Property Agency Limited is one of the largest property agencies in Hong Kong. It was established in 1978 by Shih Wing-ching.

Centaline has nearly 40,000 employees and more than 2,000 offices in 39 cities in Mainland China, Hong Kong and Macao. Centaline Holdings is also the major shareholder of another property agency in Hong Kong, Ricacorp Properties Limited.

== History ==
Centaline Property Agency Limited was founded in 1978 by Shih Wing-ching. Initially focused on the residential sector, Centaline branched out to various sectors including commercial, industrial, retail, car-parking spaces, bank-owned real estate properties and government quarters. In recent years, the company has added project management, surveying, mortgage brokerage and leasing management services. The business has also expanded to the Taipei and Singapore markets, and is gradually expanding in other Chinese-speaking areas around the world.

In November 2016, Centaline launched a cloud-based video value-added service called CentaVideo to allow the company's approximately 4,500 agents in Hong Kong to shoot video footage, edit and upload it using their mobile devices, providing residential property hunters with a home virtual tour.
