= Universal Circulating Herald =

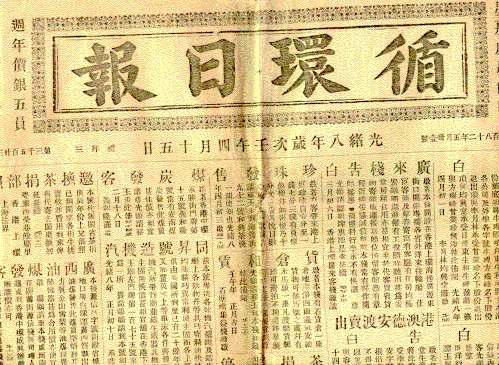
- Traditional Chinese: 循環日報
- Simplified Chinese: 循环日报
Transcriptions
Standard Mandarin
- Hanyu Pinyin: Xúnhuán Rìbào
- Wade–Giles: Hsün2-huan2 Jih4-pao4
Yue: Cantonese
- Jyutping: ceon4 waan4 jat6 bou3

Universal Circulating Herald (Chinese: 循環日報; 1874–1947) was an early Chinese-language newspaper. It was founded February 5, 1874, by Wang Tao in Hong Kong under British rule. Wang Tao, who was an advocate for institutional changes by the Qing government, rather than the purely military and technological devices promoted by the "self-strengthening" school, published these ideas in the Universal Circulating Herald.

These reformist ideas could have influenced Sun Yat-sen, who went on, in 1890–1892, to make reformist proposals to two progressive government officials, Cheng Tsao-ju (a scholar of Sun's native Chinese county of Xiangshan and a prominent and progressive official who had served as Chinese Minister to the United States between 1881 and 1885) and Zheng Guanying.

== See also ==
- List of newspapers in Hong Kong
