= Hong Kong Economic Journal =

Chinese language daily newspaper

- Native name: 信報財經新聞
- Type: Daily newspaper
- Owner: Richard Li
- Founder: Lam Shan-muk
- Publisher: Hong Kong Economic Journal Company Limited
- Editor-in-chief: Vincent Teng Chuen-cheong
- Founded: 3 July 1973
- Political alignment: Moderate
- Language: Traditional Chinese
- City: Hong Kong
- Website: www.hkej.com

Hong Kong Economic Journal
- Traditional Chinese: 信報財經新聞
- Simplified Chinese: 信报财经新闻
Transcriptions
Standard Mandarin
- Hanyu Pinyin: Xìnbào Cáijīng Xīnwén
Yue: Cantonese
- Yale Romanization: Seun bou chòih gīng sān màhn
- Jyutping: Seon^{3}bou^{3} Coi^{4}ging^{1} San^{1}man^{4}

The Hong Kong Economic Journal (HKEJ) is a Chinese-language daily newspaper published in Hong Kong by the Hong Kong Economic Journal Co., Ltd.. Available in both Hong Kong and Macau, the newspaper mainly focuses on economic news and other related, usually political issues. The newsjournal is also available to some air passengers – those travelling to the United States, Canada, and Europe. It is authorised by the Hong Kong government to publish announcements related to some law issues.

== History ==
The Hong Kong Economic Journal was founded by Lam Shan-muk (林山木), commonly known by his pen name Lam Hang-chi (林行止), who first worked as a data collector for Ming Pao during the 1960s and later as an assistant editor for the evening version of Ming Pao—and Law Chi-Ping (Chinese: 羅治平; Jyutping: lo4 zi6 ping4) – who withdrew his shares later. Together they saw the possibility of developing an economic journal for the Hong Kong public in the early 1970s (although some sources have suggested that it was Lok Yau-Mui (駱友梅), his wife, and not Law Chi-Ping who was the true co-founder) and the newspaper was first published on 3 July 1973.

In July 2008, HKEJ launched its official website hkej.com which contains the daily newspaper content, instant news, real time stock quotes and different kinds of financial data and information.

In February 2011, HKEJ launched its English website, EJ Insight.

In July 2016 the paper suspended the column of Joseph Lian Yi-zheng (練乙錚). Lian, a former member of the Central Policy Unit as well as the former editor-in-chief of HKEJ, had recently written pieces sympathetic to the localist movement, leading to allegations that his dismissal was motivated by self-censorship. A group of current and former HKEJ staff penned a letter demanding that editor-in-chief Alice Kwok Yim-ming revoke and explain the decision.

=== Ownership ===
It was reported that, as early as 10 January 2006, the Lam's family was in negotiation with Richard Li (head of Hong Kong–based telecommunication giant PCCW) and another local mass-media company for the sale of the newspaper.

On 9 August 2006, Clemont Media Limited, in which Li is the settler of the trust, bought a 50% stake in the newspaper. In August 2014, Clermont Media Limited acquired the remaining shares from Shun Po Company Limited and wholly owned the company.

== Sections ==
The Journal's pages are categorised into "News", "Investment", "Technology", "Editorials" and "Supplement".

== Related publications ==
=== EJ Insight ===
EJ Insight is the online English language news website of the Hong Kong Economic Journal. It was launched in February 2011. The content comprises a mix of original English reporting and pieces translated from the Chinese language HKEJ.

=== Hong Kong Economic Journal Monthly ===
The Hong Kong Economic Journal Monthly (信報財經月刊) is a monthly magazine associated with the newspaper. First published in March 1977, this magazine also belongs to Hong Kong Economic Journal Co., Ltd. Its contents are mainly about Hong Kong, mainland China, and international economics and finance. Different from the newspaper, the magazine is sold around the world, including Hong Kong, mainland China, Macau, Taiwan, Southeast Asia, Japan, Europe, Australia, and the United States. The current chief editor of the magazine is Vincent Teng Chuen-cheong (鄧傳鏘).

== See also ==
- Newspapers of Hong Kong
- Media in Hong Kong
