= Hong Kong Audit Bureau of Circulations =

The Hong Kong Audit Bureau of Circulations (Chinese: 香港出版銷數公證會), or HKABC in short, was established in April 1995.

It is a non-profit organization which aims at promoting the cause of circulation auditing in Hong Kong. It seeks to encourage a higher standard of circulation data management and reporting so as to protect the rights of advertisers and media buyers, and uphold the integrity and credibility of publishers.

== See also ==
- Media in Hong Kong
- Newspapers of Hong Kong
