= Headline Daily =

Hong Kong free weekday newspaper

- Type: Free daily newspaper
- Format: Tabloid
- Owner: Sing Tao News Corporation
- Founder: Sing Tao News Corporation
- Publisher: Sing Tao News Corporation
- Founded: 12 July 2005
- Political alignment: Pro-China
- Language: Chinese (in Traditional Chinese characters)
- Headquarters: Tseung Kwan O Industrial Estate
- Country: Hong Kong
- Website: www.hkheadline.com
- Free online archives: paper.stheadline.com/headline/

Headline Daily
- Traditional Chinese: 頭條日報
- Simplified Chinese: 头条日报
- Jyutping: tau4 tiu4 jat6 bou3
- Cantonese Yale: tau4 tiu4 yat6 bou3
Transcriptions
Standard Mandarin
- Hanyu Pinyin: Tóu Tiáo Rì Bào
Yue: Cantonese
- Yale Romanization: tau4 tiu4 yat6 bou3
- Jyutping: tau4 tiu4 jat6 bou3

Headline Daily (Chinese: 頭條日報) is a free weekday mass-market newspaper in Hong Kong. It was launched on 12 July 2005, by the Sing Tao group, as the territory's second free Chinese-language newspaper, after Metro Daily. Coverage includes local and international news, business, entertainment, lifestyle and sports. Soon after launch, it had a daily circulation of around 900,000-1,000,000.

== Market positioning ==
Sing Tao News Corporation launched Headline Daily to increase its market share of the territory's advertising market and to explore a new source of income for the corporation.

== Distribution ==
Copies are distributed during morning peak hours from Monday to Friday, except on public holidays. It is available at more than 600 locations, mostly unstaffed, including McDonald's restaurants, KCR stations (except Tsim Sha Tsui East, Tai Wai, Racecourse and Sheung Shui stations), and nearly 500 residential estates. The paper is also available at more than 100 fixed or non-fixed spots, including commercial buildings, bus/minibus stops and shopping malls around Hong Kong.

== Readership and circulation ==
The newspaper targets the working population, keeping stories focused on main points only.

In August 2005, Headline Daily was the leading free paper in Hong Kong, with a circulation of 893,000 (18% market share), ahead of Metropolis Daily (820,000, a 16% share) and am730 (401,000, an 8% share), according to a survey by Synovate.

== Contents ==
Headline Daily aims to concisely present the most important news of the day, drawing on news sources it shares with Sing Tao Daily. It usually has around 24 to 30 pages with a layout similar to the following formats:

- Headlines (i.e. coverpage; with daily information such as Mark Six Result, Activities of the Day, Lunar Calendar and Weather Forecast)
- Local News (with critics)
- China News
- International news
- Financial news (i.e. news on Real Estate, Business and stock market)
- Sports news
- Lifestyle (different topics for each day: Technology (Monday), Fashion (Tuesday), Shopping (Wednesday), Amusement (Thursday) and Food (Friday))
- Entertainment (local and international entertainment news, along with Television Programme Schedule)
- The remaining pages are used for advertisements.

Sing Tao chief executive Lo Wing-hung suggested that the paper's size could increase to 40 pages if its readership increased significantly. However, more than three months after launch, the newspaper had an average of around 24 pages.

== Marketing strategies ==
Headline Daily implements marketing strategies including:

- "lucky draws" and "voting games"
- "apple-shaped pellet": a massage device, which working class readers can use to relax themselves and relieve their stress, was once offered to readers along with their newspaper
- "happy lucky reader": one reader is randomly chosen in public areas (e.g. in a MTR train) and awarded HK$500 on a daily basis

Headline Daily stories are accessible online.

== Public relations ==
A 2021 Reuters Institute poll found that Headline Daily had a 53% trust rating from Hong Kong respondents, the fifth highest level among 15 local media outlets surveyed.

Headline Daily invites readers to submit information or news articles for publication in return for a one-off payment of $100.

== See also ==
- Sing Tao News Corporation Limited
- Sing Tao Daily
- Free daily newspapers
- Newspapers of Hong Kong
- Media in Hong Kong
