= List of awards won by Apple Daily =

Apple Daily was a Hong Kong newspaper.

== 2020 ==
=== Human Rights Press Awards ===
Award Category	Title of Entry	Result
Multimedia (Chinese)	Land of Prisons	Winner
Breaking News Writing	After Effects of Tear Gas Grenades in the Anti-Extradition Bill Movement Series	Merit

=== SOPA Awards ===
Award Category	Title of Entry	Result
Excellence in Reporting on Women's Issues	【現實版淪落人】印傭照顧失智症婆婆8年 放假帶埋出街拍片記錄生活「佢係我第二個嫲嫲」個嫲嫲」Still human in real life	Finalist
Excellence in Video Reporting	「壞人」親口揭示 中共社會信用評分系統 A dialogue with China’s Orwellian Social Credit System	Finalist
Excellence in Business Reporting	樓市怪現象 Opaque practice of sale by tender of new residential project	Finalist
The Scoop Award	新股風暴系列 Mysterious IPO Vetting Channel Triggers HKEx Corruption Scandal	Finalist
The Scoop Award	[AppleDaily Taiwan] 荒地金磚2_鋤不動的鑽石田 Land Injustice: Overpriced Farms in Taiwan	Winner

== 2019 ==
=== Human Rights Press Awards ===
Award Category	Title of Entry	Result
Breaking News Writing	Liu Xia Arrives in Germany for Treatment: Fulfilling Liu XiaoBo's Last Wish: Freedom in the End	Winner
Multimedia	[Appledaily Taiwan] #MeToo in Taiwan: Stories of Three Migrants Workers	Merit
Investigative Feature Writing	Series: Scandal of the Shatin to Central Link	Merit

=== SOPA Awards ===
Award Category	Title of Entry	Result
Excellence in Human Rights Reporting	DQ風暴 中共政治清算一整代香港人 Legislative Council Disqualification: How Communist China Fixes an Entire Generation of Hong Kongers	Award for Excellence
Excellence in Arts & Culture Reporting	【全裸寫真】台灣70歲夫婦拍全裸作品以身體談情「很久沒有這樣擁抱了」 "Haven't Hugged Like This in a Long Time": How a 70-year-old Taiwanese Couple and Their Nudity Sparked Love in Art	Finalist
Excellence in Explanatory Reporting	全球首對基因編輯女嬰誕生 惹爭議 Controversy on the Birth of the World's First Genetically Edited Baby Girl	Award for Excellence
Excellence in Reporting Breaking News	非洲豬瘟疫情逼近香港 African Swine Flu Fast Approaching Hong Kong	Award for Excellence
Excellence in Reporting Breaking News	山竹襲港系列：我城滿目瘡痍 政府救災不力 Typhoon Mangkhut Series: Hong Kong Devastated by Inept Government	Honorable Mention

== 2015 ==
=== Human Rights Press Awards ===
Award Category	Title of Entry	Award Recipients
Chinese News Merits	“Vote Rigging in District Council Elections”	Leung Yu Wo, Yuen Pak Yan, Alexander Lam Wai Chung and Lee Nga Man
Spot News Photography Merits	“The First Blood Shed in the Yuen Long Anti-smuggler Movement” “British Lesbian Faces Discrimination in Hong Kong”	Chan Yik-Chiu Yik Yeung-Man

=== SOPA ===
Award Category	Award	Title of Entry
Excellence in Reporting Breaking News	Award of Excellence	Malaysian Airline tragedy 馬航空難
The Scoop Award	Award of Excellence	PLA's secret military radar over Tai Mo Shan 解放軍大帽山秘密建軍事雷達
Excellence in Human Rights Reporting	Honorable Mention	Umbrella Movement 雨傘運動
Excellence in Reporting on Women's Issues	Honorable Mention	From Erwiana to the bitter lives of domestic workers' series 從 Erwiana 被虐到本港印傭離鄉別井苦況系列報道
Excellence in Investigative Reporting	Honorable Mention	Delayed and overspending high-speed rail series 高鐵延誤及超支系列報導

== 2014 ==
=== 2014 Human Rights Press Awards ===
Award Category	Title of Entry	Award Recipients
Spot News Photography Merits	“Lightning over Government Headquarters” – 多道閃電劃破政總上的夜空 “Open the Door”: 1,500 High School Students Strike – “開閘”	Ho Ka Tat 何家達 Lo Kwan Ho 羅君豪

== 2013 ==
=== 2013 Human Rights Press Awards ===
Award Category	Title of Entry	Award Recipients
Spot News Photography Prizes	“HKTV Staff and 100,000 Citizens Light up the Night” “港視員工與十萬市民照亮黑夜”	Lo Kwan Ho 羅君豪
Spot News Photography Prizes	“Scholarism Pushes C.Y. Leung on Universal Suffrage” “學民追擊梁振英”	Tse Wing Yiu 謝榮耀
Chinese-Language News Merits	“Exposing the ‘Big Four Developers’ Land Reserves in the New Territories” “四大發展商東北囤地分佈曝光”	韓耀庭、林偉聰、袁柏恩
Chinese–Language Cartoon / Illustration Merit	“Under C.Y. Leung’s Regime: 2013” “狼英治下 2013”	美術組 Apple Daily Art Department
Spot News Photography Merits	“Rain of Tears” – “淚雨交加”	– Chan Yik Chiu 陳奕釗
Spot News Photography Merits	“Non–local Parents Queue for Childrens’ School Admission” – “雙非家長排學位”	– Lo Kwan Ho羅君豪
Spot News Photography Merits	“Anger Over TV Licensing” – “民怨爆發”	– Lo Kwan Ho羅君豪
Spot News Photography Merits	“Policeman Grabs Female Protester” – “男警箍女示威者”	– Ho Pak Kai 何柏佳
Spot News Photography Merits	“Postgraduate Students Support Dock Workers” – “大專生撐碼頭工人”	– Chan Yik Chiu 陳奕釗

== 2012 ==
=== 2012 Human Rights Press Awards ===
Award Category	Result	Title of Entry	Award Recipients
CHINESE-LANGUAGE GENERAL NEWS	PRIZE	發展局局長呃房津醜聞系列 Series on the Hong Kong Secretary for Development's Housing Fraud Scandal	Cheng Kai-Yuen鄭啟源, Cheung Man-Kit 張文傑, Wong Wai-Chun 黃偉駿, Tam Ching-Man 譚靜雯, Lo Man-Kit 盧文烈
CARTOONS AND ILLUSTRATION	PRIZE	立法會選舉–兩制告急; 反國教; 平反六四 為李旺陽申冤 Legislative Council Elections, Anti-National Education; Justice for June 4; Justice for Li Wangyang	尊子 WONG Kee-kwan
SPOT NEWS	PRIZE	撤回國民教育科 “Withdraw National Education”	Chan Yiu-Chiu 陳奕釗
CHINESE-LANGUAGE GENERAL NEWS	MERIT	緬甸大選 “Myanmar’s Elections”	– Chan Pui-Man 陳沛敏
CHINESE-LANGUAGE GENERAL NEWS	MERIT	「狙擊洗腦工程」系列 Special Report on National Education in Hong Kong 陳茂波出租劏房系列 Series on Secretary of Development Paul Chan Mo-Po's Subdivided Apartment	Peh Lam 白琳, Pang Mei-Fong 彭美芳, Ngai Ching-Kong 倪清江
CHINESE-LANGUAGE GENERAL NEWS	MERIT	《蘋果》記者卧底直擊臨記收$300扮示威 “Reporter Going Undercover as a Demonstrator Paid $300”	Lam Wai-Chung 林偉聰, Hong Yiu-Ting 韓耀庭, Choi Kin-Ho 蔡建豪, Cheung Ngok-To 張岳弢, Ng Tsz-Kwai 吳子葵
CHINESE-LANGUAGE GENERAL NEWS	MERIT	“Thousand of Chinese Security Agents Come to Hong Kong to Gather Intelligence” 千名國安潛港收示威情報 警察淪為打手跟蹤社運人士	Lam Tsz-Pan 林子斌 (Sharp News, part of Apple Daily)
NEWSPAPER – FEATURE	MERIT	《性傾向歧視立法諮詢風雲》系列 Series on the Sexual Orientation Discrimination Ordinance	Cheung Ka-Man 張嘉雯, Wong Ka-Man 王家文, Ng Ka-Ling 吳嘉羚
NEWSPAPER – FEATURE	MERIT	一梯兩伙變13戶天台「失蹤」建四屋 遺忘慘劇馬頭圍唐樓越劏越狼 “Two Apartments Divided into 13 Despite the Ma Tau Wai Tragedy”	Wong Ka-Man 王家文
PHOTOJOURNALISM FEATURE	MERIT	《她是年度英雄 尼泊爾女子收容獄中兒童》 “Heroine of the Year: Nepali Woman Adopts Children in Prison”	Lam Yik-Fei 林亦非 [自由傳媒人 Freelance (蘋果日報)]
PHOTOJOURNALISM FEATURE	MERIT	《最冷首都搜救流浪兒》“Rescuing Homeless Children in the Coldest Capital	Lam Yik-Fei 林亦非 [自由傳媒人 Freelance (蘋果日報)]
SPOT NEWS	MERIT	賀莫言、劉曉波被阻 “Celebration of Mo Yan and Liu Xiaobo Nobel Wins Barred”	– Ho Pak-Kai 何柏佳
SPOT NEWS	MERIT	濫用警權 “Police Abusing Power”	Ho Pak-Kai 何柏佳
SPOT NEWS	MERIT	梁振英擊敗唐英年 “C.Y. Leung Defeats Henry Tang”	Ho Pak-Kai 何柏佳
SPOT NEWS	MERIT	產婦嬰兒瞓走廊 “Pregnant Women and Newborns Forced to Sleep in Hospital Corridors”	Leung Kam- Cheung 梁鑑章
SPOT NEWS	MERIT	工人清折梁宅僭建物 “Workers Remove Unauthorized Building Work from C. Y. Leung’s Home	Ho Ka-Tat 何家達
SPOT NEWS	MERIT	18萬燭光悼六四 “180,000 Attend June 4 Candlelight Vigil”	Au Mak Kit 區民傑
SPOT NEWS	MERIT	民運人士方政到港 “Pro-democracy Activist Fang Zheng Arrives in Hong Kong”	Li Ka-Ho 李家皓

== 2011 ==
=== 2011 Human Rights Press Awards ===
Award Category	Title of Entry
CHINESE GENERAL NEWS PRIZE	Legislative Council Election Rigging Series – One House, Seven Surnames and Thirteen Votes; Vote Rigging with Demolished Apartment 區議會選舉種票系列之1屋7姓13票 樓拆了照種票
CHINESE GENERAL NEWS MERIT	CPC Member as District Councilor in Hong Kong 共幹漂白 種票又種人
CHINESE NEWSPAPER – FEATURE PRIZE	In the Lens of a Child in Poverty 貧童鏡頭下看貧窮
CHINESE NEWSPAPER – FEATURE MERIT	Troubled Livelihood of Hawkers – FEHD Abusive Power, Suppression by Link Reits 小販討生計舉步維艱 食環惡法害人領匯瘋狂打壓
PHOTOJOURNALISM FEATURE MERIT	Refugees in Thailand and Myanmar 泰緬難民
Spot News MERIT	Consultation turns into war of words 替補諮詢變罵戰
Spot News MERIT	Executive Vice-Premier Li Keqiang Visited the University of Hong Kong, Police Suppressed Student's Demonstration 李克強訪港大校慶 警方鎮壓學生
Spot News MERIT	Candlelight never dies 燭光不滅
Spot News MERIT	Action requesting withdrawal of Arrangements for Filling Vacancies in the Legislative Council 空襲立法會撤回替補方案
Spot News MERIT	Executive Vice-Premier Li Keqiang provoked demonstration to safeguard freedom of press 李克強風波︰還我採訪權

== 2010 ==
=== 2010 Human Rights Press Awards ===
Award Category	Title of Entry
CHINESE NEWSPAPER – FEATURE MERIT	Political reform duo accused of Correctional Department gambling 政改雙雄出獄大踼爆
Spot News MERIT	Teacher says, “I must have a right to vote for the election of chief executive” 老師: 我有權選特首(突發)
Spot News MERIT	Visually impaired disabled students finally experience the magic of art 視障殘疾學童終能親身感受藝術的魔力

== 2009 ==
=== 2009 Human Rights Press Awards ===
Award Category	Title of Entry
CHINESE-LANGUAGE GENERAL NEWS MERIT	21 Liu Xiaobo supporters at Lo WuMainland Security Crosses Borders to Arrest Hong Kong Protesters 21市民羅湖橋挺劉曉波 公安越境拘港示威
CHINESE-LANGUAGE GENERAL NEWS MERIT	Eight Instances of Power AbuseLi's Mother: Police will always side with police 濫權八指控俱遭否認 李婉儀母不滿 「警察還是幫警察」
CHINESE NEWSPAPER – FEATURE SPECIAL MERIT	60 Years of Communist Rule in China: The Hong Kong Story “Then ‘Five Black Categories’ Sigh at China's Current Situation: Prisons that Fed Well” and “From an Illegal Immigrant to a District Councilor” 中共建政60年: 香港故事 當年黑五類 慨歎大陸現況:有飽飯食的監獄 及 偷渡開山當議員
CHINESE NEWSPAPER – FEATURE SPECIAL MERIT	June 4 20 Anniversary Series: Teacher Refuses to Grade a Student's Drawing 六四二十周年特輯之孩子這幅畫 老師不打分
COMIC MERIT	Windows and Orphans are not Missed 孤寡也不放過
Spot News PRIZE	No Clearance of Tsoi Yuen Tsuen! 反對清拆菜園村
Spot News PRIZE	Fight for Human Rights 爭取人權

== 2008 ==
=== 2008 Human Rights Press Awards ===
Award Category	Title of Entry
CHINESE GENERAL NEWS PRIZE	Liu Xiaobo and signers of Charter 08 suppressed 學者聯署《08憲章》籲中共憲改遭打壓劉曉波被拘公安抄家
CHINESE-LANGUAGE GENERAL NEWS MERIT	Police bring heavy charges 警用重典釘死示威者
CHINESE FEATURE NEWS PRIZE	Series: Remembering Tin Shui Wai tragedy 天水圍倫常慘劇一周年系列
CHINESE FEATURE NEWS MERIT	Violence against human rights protest 暴力阻人權示威怒民憤青踐踏言論自由
CHINESE FEATURE NEWS MERIT	HKU student demonstrates with self-made Tibetan flag 抗議傳聖火呼籲網民加入港大女生自製雪山獅子旗示威
CARTOON PRIZE	Waiting for your vote 等你一票

== 2006 ==
=== 2006 Human Rights Press Awards ===
Award Category	Title of Entry	Winning Journalists
CARTOON MERIT	Spying charges 間碟罪	尊子 WONG Kee-kwan
PHOTOGRAPHY MERIT	Child with facial burns rejected by school 鬼孩子想上學被拒校門外	曾顯華 Tsang, H.W.

== 2005 ==
=== 2005 Human Rights Press Awards ===
Award Category	Title of Entry
CHINESE GENERAL NEWS PRIZE	In remembrance of Zhao Ziyang 憑良心 悼紫陽
CHINESE GENERAL NEWS PRIZE	July 1 Protest, 530,000 on street 七一‧53萬人上街
CHINESE-LANGUAGE GENERAL NEWS MERIT	Record breaking: 170,000 show up to vote 170萬人投票破紀錄
CHINESE COMMENTARY AND ANALYSIS PRIZE	Aids and China's credit crisis 賑災與中國的信用危機
CHINESE COMMENTARY AND ANALYSIS MERIT	Tragic hero – Don Quixote 唐吉訶德式的悲劇英雄
PHOTOGRAPHY WINNER	A helping hand 伸出援手
PHOTOGRAPHY MERIT	Heard but not seen 聽而不見
PHOTOGRAPHY MERIT	Appealing till the end 上訴到底

== 2004 ==
=== Human Rights Press Awards ===
Award Category	Title of Entry
CHINESE GENERAL NEWS PRIZE	Long live Hong Kong people 香港人萬歲
CHINESE GENERAL NEWS PRIZE	Guangxi sugarcane farmers earn 80 cents a day 廣西蔗農日入八毛錢吊命
CHINESE GENERAL NEWS PRIZE	Draconian Article 23 withdrew 惡法23條撤回
CHINESE-LANGUAGE NEWSPAPER – FEATURE MERIT	Government applies viperous means to suppress protesters 政府毒招打壓示威
CHINESE COMMENTARY AND ANALYSIS PRIZE	“Patriots” bury One-country-two-system 「愛國者」送一國兩制葬
CHINESE COMMENTARY AND ANALYSIS MERIT	Cast your ballot to decide who is the genuine patriot 用投票箱決定誰愛國
CHINESE COMMENTARY AND ANALYSIS MERIT	Martin Lee, you are a communist! 李柱銘，你是共產黨！
PHOTOGRAPHY MERIT	July 1 protesters 七一遊行示威者
PHOTOGRAPHY MERIT	June 1 march: clear enough? 6.1遊行：睇到未？

=== The Newspaper Society of Hong Kong "Best Hong Kong News Reporting 2004" ===
Award Category	Award	Title of Entry	Winning Journalists
Reporting Section Best News Reporting	Winner	香港送別一代鬼才黃霑 The Passing of a Genius: James Wong	採訪部 Editorial Department
Reporting Section Best News Reporting	2nd Runner-up	驚世大海嘯系列 The Tsunami of the Century: Series	採訪部 Editorial Department
Writing Section Best News Writing (Chinese)	Merit	中國人光榮 2008北京再見 Glory to China: 2008 Beijing Olympics	蔡元貴 Choy Yuen Kwei Norman
Photographic Section Best Photograph (News)	1st Runner-up	沖天大火 Backdraft	李偉民 Lee Wai Man
Photographic Section Best Photograph (News)	Merit	患難真情 True Love In Crisis	羅日昇 Law Yat Sing
Design Section Best News Page Design	1st Runner-up	黃霑病逝 各界哀痛 香港送別一代鬼才 James Wong: The Passing of a Genius Devastated Hong Kong	張志彬 Chang Chi Pun

== 2003 ==
=== 2003 Human Rights Press Awards ===
Award Category	Title of Entry
CHINESE GENERAL NEWS WINNER	阿松偷步買車系列 Antony Leung Kam-chung Corruption Case Series
CHINESE GENERAL NEWS MERIT	警鐵腕伸向六四 Police Interference in June Fourth Commemoration
CHINESE GENERAL NEWS MERIT	23條系列報導 Article 23 Series
Chinese Newspaper Feature Merit	香港有病系列 "Hong Kong Is Sick" Series
PHOTOGRAPHY MERIT	山西貧困兒童上學 Shanxi Children Going to School
PHOTOGRAPHY MERIT	迎頭一擊 Head-On

== 2002 ==
=== Human Rights Press Awards ===
Award Category	Title of Entry	Winning Journalists
CHINESE-LANGUAGE CATEGORIES GENERAL NEWS PRIZE	Police investigate Falun Gong” “查法輪功警手法卑劣”	Chan Kwong Wai & Hui King Lam 陳廣慧、許瓊霖
CHINESE-LANGUAGE CATEGORIES NEWSPAPER, FEATURE PRIZE	“Unemployment in Shenyang” “瀋陽鐵西下崗之城滿愁容”	中國組 China team
CHINESE-LANGUAGE CATEGORIES NEWSPAPER, FEATURE MERIT	“Tough life of woodmen in Shandong” “山東貧農鋸木討活斷指萬千”	中國組 China team
PHOTOGRAPHY MERIT	“Child Beggars – Pakistan” “行乞小童：巴基斯坦”	Ling Shu Fai 凌樹輝
PHOTOGRAPHY MERIT	“Woodmen – Pay the price” “伐木工人：生活代價”	Tsang Hin Wah 曾顯華

=== The Newspaper Society of Hong Kong "Best Hong Kong News Reporting" ===
Award Category	Award	Title of Entry
Writing Section Best Headline (Chinese)	Winner	一代歌聖 與世長辭 羅文活在歌聲裏 Hong Kong God of Songs: Roman Tam Passed
Writing Section Best Headline (Chinese)	1st Runner-up	香港還有一個好老細 好世界酒樓結業 有情有義有糧出 The Last Good Boss in Hong Kong: Salary even after Restaurant Closure
Writing Section Best Headline (Chinese)	Merit	沒飯吃也要讀書 貴州窮孩子借糧上學欠老師一身債 Guizhou Teachers Loaned Out Money to Disadvantaged Students to Attend School
Writing Section Best Headline (Chinese)	Merit	劉嘉玲勇敢地站出來 不想還有人經歷我一樣的遭遇 Carina Lau Sexual Assault case: Don't Want Anyone Experience What I Went Through
Writing Section Best News Writing (Chinese)	Winner	沒飯吃也要讀書 貴州窮孩子借糧上學欠老師一身債 Guizhou Teachers Loaned Out Money to Disadvantaged Students to Attend School
Photographic Section Best Photograph (News)	Winner	命懸一綫 Life Hung by a Thread
Photographic Section Best Photograph (Features)	Winner	無間渡 Timeless Raft
Photographic Section Best Photograph (Features)	Merit	鳥之水巢 Birds' Water Nest
Photographic Section Best Photograph (Sports)	Winner	舞林高手 Master of Dance
Photographic Section Best Photograph (Sports)	2nd Runner-up	你爭我奪 We Fight
Photographic Section Best Photograph (Sports)	Merit	裸跑 Naked Run
Design Section Best News Page Design	2nd Runner-up	羅文活在歌聲裏 Roman Tam: Life in Music

== 2000 ==
=== 2000 Human Rights Press Awards ===
Award Category	Title of Entry	Winning Journalists
SPECIAL MENTION	“鄭安國-香港” (Cheung An-kuo – Hong Kong)	張家俊 (Cheung Ka-chun)
SPECIAL MENTION	“李國能(獨坐)” (Chief Justice Andrew Li)	凌樹輝 (Ling Shu-fai)
SPECIAL MENTION	“張敏儀” (Cheung Man-yee of RTHK)	黎樹雄 (Lai Shu-hung)
SPECIAL MENTION	“法輪功(澳門回歸)” (Falun Gong at Macau Handover)	王子俊 (Wong Chi-chun)

== 1999 ==
=== 1999 Human Rights Press Awards ===
Award Category	Title of Entry	Winning Journalists
SPECIAL MENTION	“Reporter’s Life” “June 4 Candlelight Vigil”	David Au

== 1998 ==
=== Asian Newspaper Awards ===
These awards were announced at the Asian Newspaper Publishers' Expo (ANPE) and International Association for Newspaper and Media Technology (IFRA) annual conference in Kuala Lumpur on 30 March 1998. Apple Daily was named "Asian Newspaper of the Year".
