= List of Eyeshield 21 characters =

The Eyeshield 21 anime and manga series features an extensive cast of characters created by Riichiro Inagaki and Yusuke Murata. The series takes place in Tokyo, Japan, where the members of Deimon Devil Bats have the ambition to compete at the Christmas Bowl, the most important high school American football championship of the country.

The main character of the series is Sena Kobayakawa, a wimpy boy who was a gofer to avoid being bullied during his childhood; he enters Deimon High School. While he runs away from the Ha-Ha Brothers his running ability is witnessed by Yoichi Hiruma, the captain of the Deimon Devil Bats, the school's American football team. After this, Hiruma coerces Sena to join the club under the alias "Eyeshield 21" to keep him from being recruited by other teams. Sena and Hiruma along with the other member of the club, Ryokan Kurita, try to recruit new players to compete at the Christmas Bowl.

While developing the characters, Murata intended to create characters who have unique qualities and that could stand out amidst the teams they are included. He focused his work on the characters' outfits since he thought it was the thing that would be most noted during the matches. Inagaki also used real-world influence for the teams. Most reviewers have praised the characters of the series, declaring that the characters are one of the best elements of the Eyeshield 21 series as they are distinguishable.

== Creation and conception ==
When Riichiro Inagaki and Yusuke Murata were creating the Eyeshield 21 series, Murata was concerned that each character had a stand-out quality because many of them are in groups. Murata said that "due to their heavy protective gear, it would be very difficult to identify personal characteristics in games" and because of this he decided to become more engaged in detailing their clothes, "so the most work on character designs are on their uniforms". Inagaki conceived the teams knowing that "each team has its own style", and designed the characters prior to assigning them a team.

== Main characters ==
The main characters of the Eyeshield 21 series are part of Deimon Devil Bats, (Note: 泥門デビルバッツ, Deimon Debiru Battsu) an American football team based on Deimon Private Senior High School. (Note: 私立泥門高等学校, Shiritsu Deimon Kōtōgakkō) The Deimon Devil Bats were founded by Yoichi Hiruma, Ryokan Kurita, and Musashi under the name of Mao Devil Bats. (Note: 麻黄デビルバッツ, Maō Debiru Battsu)^{[ch. 57]} After its inaugural year, they need to refound the team in Deimon.^{[ch. 171]} However, its membership was further reduced with the departure of Musashi.^{[ch. 132]} This remains the case until Hiruma discovers Sena Kobayakawa and his amazing running ability.^{[ch. 2]} For the creation of Deimon Devil Bats' uniform, Murata was inspired by the Philadelphia Eagles' gear and helmets, and for its logo he created six prototypes, saying he "spent a lot of work on designing the logo".

=== Sena Kobayakawa ===
Voiced by: Miyu Irino (Japanese); Yuri Lowenthal (English)

Sena Kobayakawa (小早川 瀬那, Kobayakawa Sena) is one of the main characters in the Eyeshield 21 series. During his childhood, he was a shy boy who was bullied and needed to be protected by Mamori Anezaki.^{[ch. 8]} Seeing this, Riku Kaitani, a young friend of Sena, taught him a running technique he referred to as the "explosive run" so Sena could defend himself. However, Sena used this to become a gofer for others instead of getting rid of bullies.^{[ch. 128]} In his first day at Deimon High School, he is chased by three bullies known as the Ha-Ha Brothers and his speed is discovered by Hiruma.^{[ch. 2]} Under the alias "Eyeshield 21" because of the green eyeshield he wears to conceal his identity, Sena joins Deimon's football team as a running back.^{[ch. 1]}

=== Yoichi Hiruma ===
Voiced by: Atsushi Tamura (Japanese); Derek Stephen Prince (English)

Yoichi Hiruma (蛭魔 妖一, Hiruma Yōichi) is the captain and the quarterback of the Deimon Devil Bats. When he was a child, Hiruma learned about American football after crawling through a hole in a fence of an American military base.^{[ch. 248]} He befriended Ryokan Kurita and Musashi, and with them, founded the Mao Devil Bats.^{[ch. 57]} After completing middle school he intended to join the Shinryuji Naga, but as Kurita failed the entrance exam, he entered Deimon. Along with Kurita and Musashi, he re-established their former club, Mao Devil Bats, but renamed the team the Deimon Devil Bats.^{[ch. 171]} As Musashi leaves the club and few people have an interest in American football, he starts to blackmail students, forcing them to join the club.^{[ch. 3]} Hiruma is greatly feared both by students and administrative members of the school.^{[ch. 1, 89]} Besides blackmailing people, he also intimidates them with the multiple firearms he carries with him.^{[ch. 26]} He is also a genius in maverick trick plays and mind games that he uses to try to frighten his adversaries.^{[ch. 45, 136]}

=== Ryokan Kurita ===
Voiced by: Kōichi Nagano

Ryokan Kurita (栗田 良寛, Kurita Ryōkan) is the largest and strongest lineman and player in the Deimon Devil Bats. Kurita met Hiruma and Musashi before entering high school, and with them founded the Mao Devil Bats,^{[ch. 57]} promising that one day they would contest the Christmas Bowl.^{[ch. 60]} Before completing high school, Kurita wanted to join the Shinryuji Naga through a scholarship, but Agon Kongo, who is considered a prodigy, entered his vacancy, and since he could not pass the school's exam he joined Deimon.^{[ch. 171]} Kurita is a kind-hearted individual who tries to do not hurt other people, but while on the field he does not hesitate to use all his strength.^{[ch. 1, 142]} When playing, Kurita shouts his kiai "Funnuraba!" (Note: フンヌラバっ) when exerting extra effort.^{[ch. 5]} At the end of the series, he is shown to be attending Enma University alongside Sena, Monta, Riku, Mizumachi, Unsui and Kotaro.^{[ch. 333]}

=== Monta ===
Voiced by: Kappei Yamaguchi

Taro Raimon (雷門 太郎, Raimon Tarō) is the primary wide receiver of the Deimon Devil Bats. He is most known as Monta (モン太), a nickname given to him by Hiruma, who said that this name alluded to Joe Montana.^{[ch. 39]} Initially, he wants to become a baseball player, and sees Masaru Honjo, a Shuei the Bears' outfielder, as an idol. However, due to his lack of ability in other areas than reception he is not cast for the main team. Then, Sena invites him to join the Devil Bats, but he refuses the offer.^{[ch. 23]} Monta only enters the team after being scammed by Hiruma, who says the team needed someone to protect Mamori Anezaki from the egoistic and harmful Eyeshield 21.^{[ch. 24]} From there on, he decides he will become a hero through American football.^{[ch. 28]} He has a habit to go into a pose after a catch while yelling "Catch Max", also adding "Max" to nearly anything he describes while excited or determined.^{[ch. 28]} In many aspects, Monta resembles a monkey, and it is used as a recurring gag throughout the series.^{[ch. 145]} At the end of the series, he is shown to be attending Enma University.^{[ch. 333]}

=== Other ===
==== Mamori Anezaki ====
Voiced by: Aya Hirano (Japanese); Kate Higgins (English)

Mamori Anezaki (姉崎 まもり, Anezaki Mamori) is a childhood friend of Sena that has been protecting him from bullies since primary school. At high school, and after Sena joins the American football club, Mamori also joins it as the club manager to protect him.^{[ch. 8]} Despite joining the club just to protect Sena, she eventually becomes an excellent manager who knows the rules, analyzes the adversaries strategies and creates strategies to combat them.^{[ch. 9, 147]} Mamori's drawing abilities are terrible if compared to her other academic abilities—actually she is one of the school's top three students—and it is a recurring gag throughout the series.

==== The Ha-Ha Brothers ====
Voiced by: Takanori Hoshino (Kazuki Jumonji), Masami Iwasaki (Koji Kuroki), Takeshi Maeda (Shozo Togano) (Japanese); Kirk Thornton (Kazuki Jumonji), Lex Lang, (Koji Kuroki) Liam O'Brien (Shozo Togano) (English)

The Ha-Ha Brothers (ハァハァ3兄弟, Ha Ha San Kyōdai) are three juvenile delinquents who join the team after Hiruma blackmails them with a negative of a picture where they appear nude.^{[ch. 27]} Despite not being brothers, Hiruma calls them this way due to their habit of expression, with each one of the trio saying "Ha!?", in rapid succession with a crescendo.^{[ch. 29]} The gang is formed by Kazuki Jumonji, (Note: 十文字 一輝, Jūmonji Kazuki) considered the group's leader, Koji Kuroki, (Note: 黒木 浩二, Kuroki Kōji) and Shozo Togano. (Note: 戸叶 庄三, Toganō Shōzō) They join the club permanently after passing the test that consists in climbing Tokyo Tower without letting an ice bag melt.^{[ch. 33]} They are notably poor and inexperienced at the game when they start out, and so they are called "trash" by other players, journalists and even the father of Jumonji.^{[ch. 40, 54]} This disbelief, however, make them strive to prove to those who do not believe in their skills that they are very capable linemen.^{[ch. 304]}

==== Manabu Yukimitsu ====
Voiced by: Masaru Hōta

Manabu Yukimitsu (雪光 学, Yukimitsu Manabu) is a second-year student who has always been dedicated to only the studies. His mother wants him to be a studious person and makes him study from day till night in addition to going to cram school. Contradicting his mother, Yukimitsu decides he wants to have sweet memories of his high school not related to studying, and so he applies for Hiruma's qualification test and enters the Deimon Devil Bats.^{[ch. 33, 304]} Yukimitsu does not participate in the first game and knowing his limitations he begins to devote more on training to dispute the Autumn Tokyo Tournament.^{[ch. 54]} However, he is not cast to that competition,^{[ch. 90]} making his debut only in the match against the Shinryuji Naga at the Kantō Tournament.^{[ch. 180]}

==== Daikichi Komusubi ====
Voiced by: Hidenori Sakaki

Daikichi Komusubi (小結 大吉, Komusubi Daikichi) is one of the linemen of the Deimon Devil Bats. Daikichi is highly impressed by Kurita's amazing strength when first sees him and decides that he wants to become Kurita's "apprentice".^{[ch. 32]} He joined the team after surviving the Tokyo Tower qualifying test, beating out the Ha-Ha Brothers.^{[ch. 33]} He does not talk much, and speaks only in the so-called "language of strong men", that only "truly strong men" (his father and Kurita) can understand, which consists mostly of strange grunts and one-word sentences.^{[ch. 34]}

==== Suzuna Taki ====
Voiced by: Shoko Nakagawa

Suzuna Taki (瀧 鈴音, Taki Suzuna) is a blue-haired girl who is always wearing rollerblades. In the manga, Suzuna first appears in a scene in the United States where she is looking for her brother, Natsuhiko, and meets with Sena;^{[ch. 82]} in the anime, she appears before it, yet in Japan, where she is working as a reporter hired to discover the secret identity of Eyeshield 21. Later, Suzuna follows the team back to Japan and then proclaims herself a cheerleader for the Devil Bats even though she is not from Deimon High School.^{[ch. 89]}

==== Doburoku Sakaki ====
Voiced by: Shōichiro Akaboshi

Doburoku Sakaki (酒奇 溝六, Sakaki Doburoku) is the physical trainer and equipment manager of the Deimon Devil Bats and a former American footballer. He trained Hiruma, Musashi, and Kurita, and taught them how to play American football before they entered high school. However, after his loan shark's debts became too high because of his gambling habits, he left them and fled to the United States.^{[ch. 75]} There, he became a beach football coach, returning to Japan only after Hiruma paid all his debts.^{[ch. 88]} He and Ojo's trainer and coach, Gunpei Shoji, were teammates at Sengoku University's American football team, and were known as "The Twin Japanese Blades", (Note: 二本刀, Nihon Gatana) where he played as a tight end.^{[ch. 86]}

==== Natsuhiko Taki ====
Voiced by: Kōji Ochiai

Natsuhiko Taki (瀧 夏彦, Taki Natsuhiko) is a high school student who has the dream of becoming an NFL player. He is an incredibly vain and narcissistic person usually dismissed as an idiot by several people, including his sister Suzuna and Hiruma, due to his odd and rather foolish attitude;^{[ch. 83, 85]} it is exemplified by his habit of opening his jacket to bare his pecs and making weird poses and pirouettes.^{[ch. 83, 90]} However, Taki takes football seriously and uses his flexibility to block his opponents.^{[ch. 164]} After he is rejected by Japan's high school teams,^{[ch. 90]} Taki travels to the United States, abandoning his family, to attend open tryouts in San Antonio by taking all the savings in his house to afford his flight and traveling expenses.^{[ch. 83]} Taki fails, but Sena asks him to join the Devil Bats back in Japan as a tight end. However, Hiruma only allows him to join the team if he follows them in the Death March, a journey of two thousand kilometers along the Mojave Desert.^{[ch. 85]} After arriving in Japan, he has yet to make the high school entrance exam, and he debuts only in the second match of the Autumn Tokyo Tournament.^{[ch. 101, 104]}

==== Musashi ====
Voiced by: Rikiya Koyama

Gen Takekura (武蔵 厳, Takekura Gen), most known as Musashi (ムサシ), is the kicker of the Deimon Devil Bats. Along with Hiruma and Kurita, he established the team originally under the name of Mao Devil Bats during their middle school years. However, Musashi is forced to leave the team and drop out of high school during his first year at Deimon to work as the construction foreman at his family company after his father had suffered an accident at work.^{[ch. 132,140]} Despite this, Musashi has his company help build updated accommodations for the Devil Bats and maintains a cordial relationship with Hiruma. Sena and Monta discover Musashi's identity and he promises to return to Deimon if they can prove themselves to him. Musashi repeatedly refuses to rejoin his former teammates until the later phase of the fall tournament, after his father and workers convince him to return. In the manga, it occurs against the Seibu Wild Gunmen,^{[ch. 141]} and in the anime he returns later against the Bando Spiders. Despite the title of "The 60-yard Magnum" (Note: 60ヤードマグナム, Rokujū Yādo Magunamu) being actually a lie that Hiruma fabricated to scare the opponents, this arouses the rivalry of Kotaro Sasaki,^{[ch. 57]} and it becomes truth when Mushashi converts a field goal of 60 meters against Teikoku Alexanders at the Christmas Bowl.^{[ch. 303, 304]}

==== Tetsuo Ishimaru ====
Voiced by: Kei Katō (Japanese); Grant George (English)

Tetsuo Ishimaru (石丸 哲生, Ishimaru Tetsuo) is the Devil Bats' second running back. Ishimaru is recruited from the track team by Sena who takes over half of his paper route for him.^{[ch. 3]} Ishimaru is considered an extremely ordinary person, and thus, many times, his adversaries and even teammates do not note his presence on the field.^{[ch. 29]} Nevertheless, Ishimaru's obscurity works to his advantage when playing since no one notices when he is handing the ball.^{[ch. 121, 282]}

== Supporting characters ==
=== Ojo White Knights ===
The Ojo White Knights (王城ホワイトナイツ, Ōjō Howaito Naitsu) are considered the second best team in Kantō behind Shinryuji Naga at the start of Eyeshield 21. Three years prior to the series' start, a group of defense-focused Ojo players known as "Golden Generation" manages to get close to defeat the Shinryuji Naga. However, they are defeated after Agon and Unsui Kongo enter the match.^{[ch. 50]} Its members include Seijuro Shin, the linebacker, Haruto Sakuraba, the wide receiver, Ichiro Takami, the quarterback, Makoto Otawara, the captain, and Gunpei Shoji (庄司軍平, Shōji Gunpei), nicknamed Shogun (ショーグン), the head coach and trainer.^{[ch. 111]}

==== Seijuro Shin ====
Voiced by: Naoya Gomoto (Japanese); Crispin Freeman (English)

Seijuro Shin (進 清十郎, Shin Seijūro) is the ace linebacker of the Ojo White Knights. Shin only joins an American football club because he is accompanying Haruto Sakuraba on the admission exam when the coach Gunpei Shoji sees his potential.^{[ch. 37]} Over time, he is regarded as the best linebacker in Japan, and is known for his obsessive training habits.^{[ch. 8, 14]} Shin is also a good observer; at the first time Shin meets Sena, he realizes that Sena is the "Eyeshield 21", starting their rivalry.^{[ch. 25]} Despite this, he serves as a personal coach for Sena during the Devil Bats' preparation for the Christmas Bowl.^{[ch. 278]} Shin was modeled after Bruce Lee, and Murata noted he becomes like a real person as the story progresses.

==== Haruto Sakuraba ====
Voiced by: Mamoru Miyano (Japanese); Tony Oliver (English)

Haruto Sakuraba (桜庭 春人, Sakuraba Haruto) is the Ojo White Knights' wide receiver. While in high school he entered the team due to his unpaired height; however, Shin surpasses him. Sakuraba feels envious of Shin's success and achievements, and disappointed with himself he becomes a model of Jari Productions.^{[ch. 37]} Because of his popularity, people mistake him for the ace of the Ojo team; however, he is initially seen by the other players only as a pitchman and an average player.^{[ch. 13, 91]} After getting injured and being hospitalized he meets Torakichi, a boy who admires him only due to his skills, and Sakuraba becomes excited again to play American football.^{[ch. 37, 38]} Sakuraba starts to try harder, shaves his hair and let his beard grow, and before the start of the Autumn Tokyo Tournament he resigns with Jari Pro.^{[ch. 92, 94]}

==== Ichiro Takami ====
Voiced by: Kenji Hamada

Ichiro Takami (高見 伊知郎, Takami Ichirō) is the Ojo White Knights' quarterback. At first, a childhood leg injury left him unable to run as quickly as quarterbacks need to run. After the coach told him he could not play due to this drawback, he decided to train more running and to study calculations to make his passes more precise. Finally, after his fourth year on the team, he became the team's starting quarterback for the Kantō Tournament.^{[ch. 92]}

==== Makoto Otawara ====
Voiced by: Kenji Nomura (Japanese); Patrick Seitz (English)

Makoto Otawara (大田原誠, Ōtawara Makoto) is the captain and the largest lineman for the White Knights. Otawara is a very loud and brash person, who always says what he thinks. He also has a flatulence problem and makes no effort to hide it.^{[ch. 9]} In contrast to his strength, Otawara is plain stupid, as Shoji, the White Knight's coach, puts it, and even he admits it.^{[ch. 12]} Although most featured as a comic relief in the series, Otawara can be very insightful, which genuinely shocks just about everyone.^{[ch. 118]} Later, he serves as a personal coach for Daikichi Komusubi during the Devil Bats' preparation for the Christmas Bowl.^{[ch. 278]}

=== Seibu Wild Gunmen ===
The Seibu Wild Gunmen (西部ワイルドガンマンズ, Seibu Wairudo Ganmanzu) are a team from the Kantō region of Japan. They are considered to be the strongest offensive team in Tokyo. Its members include Kid, the quarterback, Jo Tetsuma, the wide receiver, Riku Kaitani, the running back, Buffalo Ushijima, (Note: バッファロー牛島, Baffarō Ushijima) a lineman and the team's captain,^{[ch. 137]} and "Doc" Holiday, (Note: ドク堀出, Doku Horide) the coach.^{[ch. 35]}

==== Kid ====
Voiced by: Yūya Uchida

Kid (キッド, Kiddo), whose real name is Shien Mushanokoji (武者小路紫苑, Mushanokōji Shien), is the Seibu Wild Gunmen's quarterback. He is the son of Hajime Mushanokoji, (Note: 武者小路一, Mushanokōji Hajime) a three-time Olympic gold medalist in shooting sport.^{[ch. 131]} His father always wanted Shien to be a shooter like him and imposed on his son a lot of pressure. After he could not win a championship and thought he disappointed his father, Shien left his home and abandoned his name, adopting the pseudonym "Kid".^{[ch. 139, 245]} He is known for having one of the quickest passing arms as he never took a sack. In the "Quick-Draw Pass" he throws the ball in 0.2 seconds by using both of his hands to generate a fast spiral, and due to this and his background in shooting he earned the moniker "Quick-Draw Kid". (Note: 早撃ちキッド, Hayauchi Kiddo)^{[ch. 135]}

==== Jo Tetsuma ====
Voiced by: Eiji Takemoto

Jo Tetsuma (鉄馬丈, Tetsuma Jō) is the wide receiver of the Seibu Wild Gunmen. He is a childhood friend of Kid and his father was the driver of Kid's father's.^{[ch. 139]} He is very quiet and follows all orders given to him in an extreme way; he memorizes a number of different passing routes, and once Kid calls one out, he will almost automatically not falter from the course unless overpowered.^{[ch. 73, 136]} However, he does act upon his own impulses to help keep Monta from attacking the referee to keep the Devil Bats from being disqualified.^{[ch. 150, 151]} Later, he serves as a personal coach for Manabu Yukimitsu during the Devil Bats' preparation for the Christmas Bowl.^{[ch. 278]}

==== Riku Kaitani ====
Voiced by: Yuuki Masuda; Chikiri Kyoko (child)

Riku Kaitani (甲斐谷陸, Kaitani Riku) is the running back of the Seibu Wild Gunmen. He is a childhood friend of Sena, whom he considers a little brother, and who taught Sena how to run extremely fast in order to stand up to bullies. Riku eventually moves away and only meets Sena again during the Autumn Tokyo Tournament.^{[ch. 128]} Later, he serves as a personal coach for Tetsuo Ishimaru during the Devil Bats' preparation for the Christmas Bowl.^{[ch. 278]} At the end of the series, he is shown to be attending Enma University.^{[ch. 333]}

=== Shinryuji Naga ===
Shinryuji Naga (神龍寺ナーガ, Shinryūji Naga) is considered the strongest high school American football team in Kantō. It is based on Kanagawa in a boys-only school which follows Buddhism. Prior to the series' start, they have never been defeated at the Kantō Tournament.^{[ch. 50]} However, in the first game of the tournament, the Devil Bats overcomes them.^{[ch. 199]} Its members include the Kongo brothers—Agon and Unsui—, Ikkyu Hosokawa, the cornerback, Gondayu Yamabushi, the senior lineman, Sanzo, (Note: サンゾー, Sanzō) an androgynous-looking running back,^{[ch. 52, 183]} and Sumito Sendoda, (Note: 仙洞田 寿人, Sumito Sendōda) the coach.^{[ch. 50]}

==== Agon Kongo ====
Voiced by: Takuya Kirimoto

Agon Kongo (金剛阿含, Kongō Agon) is the younger of twin brothers on the Shinryuji Naga team. Agon joined the school through a scholarship for students with athletic skills above average,^{[ch. 171]} and he is considered a genius player who appears only once in a century, and he treats everyone with indifference, arrogance, and as worthless trash.^{[ch. 50, 51, 177]} He can play in most of the skill positions, and has a reaction time of 0.11 seconds.^{[ch. 176, 177]} However, Agon is a womanizer and irresponsible, having to be monitored by his brother, Unsui.^{[ch. 50]} Inagaki described him as "a real ladies' man, a very strong character" and noted he could not depict Agon "laying with the ladies" in a shōnen manga.

==== Unsui Kongo ====
Voiced by: Takeshi Maeda (Japanese); Grant George (English)

Unsui Kongo (金剛雲水, Kongō Unsui) is the Naga's quarterback. He is known for his dedication to training and for his passion for football but is considered merely "a good player", the opposite of his brother, Agon.^{[ch. 51]} Unsui never overcome his brother, and, aware of such situation, he decided to make his brother the best player as possible, even taking responsibility for Agon's actions.^{[ch. 185]} However, at the end of the series, Unsui joins a different university from Agon, wishing to grow on his own and to overcome his brother.^{[ch. 333]}

==== Ikkyu Hosokawa ====
Voiced by: Toshiyuki Toyonaga

Ikkyu Hosokawa (細川一休, Hosokawa Ikkyū) is the Naga's cornerback. He has the record of 4.9 seconds in the 40-yard-dash while running backward, making him the best cornerback in the Kantō region.^{[ch. 51]} He is the only player on the Naga that Agon has any respect for since he is also considered a genius.^{[ch. 170]} Later, he serves as a personal coach for Monta during the Devil Bats' preparation for the Christmas Bowl.^{[ch. 278]} Ikkyu peppers his speech with the inflection "oni", which is used as an emphatic phrase, and is usually translated as "completely".

==== Gondayu Yamabushi ====
Voiced by: Yoshiyuki Yamaguchi

Gondayu Yamabushi (山伏権太夫, Yamabushi Gondayū) is one of the senior members and linemen of the Naga team and its captain. He joins the team through a scholarship for sportsmen, and is an elite player, according to his coach.^{[ch. 171]} During his freshman year, Yamabushi was noted alongside fellow receiver Doujirou Tenma as the future of the team. However, as skilled as he was, the lineman is embarrassed when Tenma is recruited for the all-stars of Teikoku Alexanders instead of himself.^{[ch. 289]}.

=== Teikoku Alexanders ===
Teikoku Alexanders (帝黒アレキサンダーズ, Teikoku Arekisandāzu) are a team based out of Osaka. They are known as the ultimate all-star team and, prior to the match against the Devil Bats, no team had scored against them,^{[ch. 293]} they have never called a timeout,^{[ch. 288]} and they have won the Christmas Bowl since its inception.^{[ch. 284]} They recruit the best players from all the country and stick them into a six-tiered ranking system. Players who want to move up in the ranks must memorize over one thousand different plays and all of the first string members must be able to run forty yards in under five seconds.^{[ch. 276, 282]} Its members include Takeru Yamato, the running back, Taka Honjo, the wide receiver, Karin Koizumi, the quarterback, Kureji Hera (平良呉二, Hera Kureji), most known as Heracles, a lineman and the captain,^{[ch. 281]} and Reisuke Aki (安芸礼介, Aki Reisuke), most known as Achilles, a lineman who joins the team due to its cheerleaders.^{[ch. 282]}

==== Takeru Yamato ====
Takeru Yamato (大和猛, Yamato Takeru) is the "real" Eyeshield 21. He obtained the title while attending Notre Dame High School in the United States, becoming the first player of Japanese descent to do so.^{[ch. 287]} There, he felt he lacked speed and strength, so he focused everything on balance to become unstoppable in a charge, called the "Caesar Charge". However, after he was outran by Panther, then a ball boy, during a game between Notre Dame and NASA when the two teens chased after a runaway ball, former Notre Dame student Donald Oberman witnessed this and had Yamato removed from the team, believing that Yamato was undeserving of the Eyeshield 21 title.^{[ch. 316]} Yamato returned to Japan in order to reach the top and find an opponent capable of facing him;^{[ch. 276]} he then enrolled at Teikoku High School, reaching the football team's first tier after one day.^{[ch. 278, 279]} Shortly after enrolling, Yamato gave up the Eyeshield 21 moniker, which he then passed onto Hayato Akaba when he was recruited by Teikoku. When the Deimon Devil Bats qualify for the Christmas Bowl, Yamato meets the current Eyeshield 21, Sena, and changes back to his old Eyeshield 21 title.

Yamato and Sena face each other at the Christmas Bowl as deciding on who becomes the Real Eyeshield 21.

==== Taka Honjo ====
Taka Honjo (本庄鷹, Honjō Taka) is the wide receiver of the Teikoku Alexanders and the son of Masaru Honjo. He is known for his high jumps, having the Japanese high school record in long jump, which allows him to seem like he is walking on air when catching the ball.^{[ch. 277, 283]} Masaru constantly trained Taka during his youth aiming Taka to be the best, and so he has no goal, as he thinks there is no other wide receiver as good as he.^{[ch. 278, 279]} Taka eventually finds a suitable rival in Monta, who initially fears to go against Taka due to Masaru being his idol, but who defeat him in the end.^{[ch. 278, 293]}

==== Karin Koizumi ====
Karin Koizumi (小泉香燐, Koizumi Karin) is the quarterback of the team and the only female player in the series. She would have joined the manga club when she started high school.^{[ch. 287]} Her skills as a player are discovered by Taka after he catches a ball that she threw back to him. She is reluctant at first but agrees after Yamato talks to her. As she had a natural ability for passes, Karin only trains hard to improve her dodging ability.^{[ch. 285]}

== Other characters ==
=== Taiyo Sphinx ===
The Taiyo Sphinx (太陽スフィンクス, Taiyō Sufinkusu) are a team based in the Kanagawa prefecture. They are renowned for their "Pyramid Line" composed of strong and heavy offensive and defensive linemen.^{[ch. 39]} Its members include Banba Mamoru, the captain, Kiminari Harao, (Note: 原尾 王城, Harao Kiminari) an eccentric quarterback who has his own harem and is considered a below average player,^{[ch. 170, 201]} Niinobu Kasamatsu, (Note: 笠松新信, Kasamatsu Niinobu) the second-largest player of the Pyramid Line who is easily irritated and tricked,^{[ch. 45]} Ken Kamaguruma, (Note: 鎌車ケン, Kamaguruma Ken) a tall first-year cornerback whose speciality is the bump technique.^{[ch. 46]}

==== Mamoru Banba ====
Voiced by: Taiten Kusunoki

Mamoru Banba (番場衛, Banba Mamoru) is the Taiyo Sphinx's captain. Considered one of the best linemen in Japan, he is a third-year student who holds the school record for squats.^{[ch. 41]} He is distinguished by his massive physique, complete baldness, and, during the Kantō Tournament, multiple scars from training.^{[ch. 168]} Later, he serves as a personal coach for Shozo Togano during the Devil Bats' preparation for the Christmas Bowl.^{[ch. 278]}

=== NASA Aliens ===
The NASA Shuttles (NASAシャトルズ, Nasa Shatoruzu) are a team based in Houston, Texas.^{[ch. 93]} The team was known as the NASA Aliens (NASAエイリアンズ, Nasa Eirianzu) before they changed their name after their loss to the Devil Bats in a match they have bet with Hiruma that if the NASA Aliens could not win with a lead of ten points or more, they would not return to the United States. Then its coach, Leonardo Apollo, changed the team name to return to their home country.^{[ch. 81]} Its members include Panther, the running back, Homer Fitzgerald, (Note: ホーマー・フィッツジェラルド, Hōmā Fittsujerarudo) the quarterback whose specialty is a long pass known as the "Shuttle Pass",^{[ch. 59]}, Jeremy Watt, (Note: ジェレミー・ワット, Jeremī Watto) the Japanophile wide receiver,^{[ch. 58]} and two brothers, Nisan (Note: ニーサン・ゴンザレス, Nīsan Gonzaresu) and Otto Gonzalez; (Note: オットー・ゴンザレス, Ottō Gonzaresu) the former is tall and strong and the latter smaller, but faster.^{[ch. 66]} Inagaki visited a space center to collect reference materials to use as a basis for creating the team.

==== Panther ====
Voiced by: Kōsuke Kujirai

Patrick Spencer (パトリック・スペンサー, Patorikku Supensā), most known as Panther (パンサー, Pansā), is the only black member of the NASA Aliens. He is also known as "The Man who Possesses Weightless Legs" (Note: 無重力の脚を持つ男, Mujūryoku no Ashi o Motsu Otoko) because he has innate and extraordinary running talents.^{[ch. 69]} However, by the start of the series, he is just used as a ball boy by the team coach, Leonard Apollo.^{[ch. 59]} Panther struggles because he has the dream of becoming a professional NFL player to sustain his grandmother, and also because he admires Apollo.^{[ch. 60, 70]} Apollo allows him to play for the first time in the match against the Devil Bats.^{[ch. 68]} Later, he is recruited by the Team USA.^{[ch. 306]}

==== Leonard Apollo ====
Voiced by: Kenyu Horiuchi

Leonard Apollo (レオナルド・アポロ, Reonarudo Aporo) is the coach of the NASA Aliens team. He is a former professional, NFL player, known for his dedication to training.^{[ch. 70]} When he is removed from the team in favor of Morgan, a black man with innate talents, he becomes a racist, not only against African-American but to Japanese as well.^{[ch. 53, 68]} After this event, he decided he would form the best team possible with only white players,^{[ch. 70]} and due to this attitude, he initially forbids Panther for playing.^{[ch. 59]} However, he changes his mind after all members of the Aliens do a dogeza to ask him to let Panther play.^{[ch. 68]}

=== Kyoshin Poseidon ===
Kyoshin Poseidon (巨深ポセイドン) are a team known for its members' height. Its members include Shun Kakei, the main linebacker, Kengo Mizumachi, the main lineman, Osamu Kobanzame, (小判鮫オサム, Kobanzame Osamu) the de jure captain of the team,^{[ch. 111, 122]} and the two tallest high school football players in Japan, Hiroshi Ohira (Note: 大 平洋, Ōhira Hiroshi) and Hiroshi Onishi, (Note: 大 西洋, Ōnishi Hiroshi) who greatly admire Kakei.^{[ch. 119]}

==== Shun Kakei ====
Voiced by: Kōsuke Takeuchi

Shun Kakei (筧 駿, Kakei Shun) is a linebacker and the de facto captain of the team due to Osamu's shyness. During middle school, he was considered an exceptional player because he was taller than the other Japanese students. Because of this, he moved to the United States to play football there, but realized he was not as good as he thought he was. Kakei almost abandoned football after his team lost to Notre Dame but after meeting Notre Dame's Eyeshield 21, who was also Japanese, he decided to train more to face him again. Kakei achieved his goal, but Eyeshield 21 disappeared, which caused him to return to Japan to find him.^{[ch. 112]} There, Kakei enrolled at Kyoshin. Before Kyoshin and Deimon play against each other in the fall tournament, Kakei dismisses Sena as a fraud due to him not resembling the Eyeshield 21 he faced in America but changes his mind after Sena and Deimon win against Kyoshin. Both Kakei and Sena discover from Hayto Akaba that Eyeshield 21 is in fact a title passed onto the best runner at Notre Dame and that the "real" Eyeshield 21 Kakei played against was Takeru Yamato. Kakei helps to train Jumonji Kazuki before the match between Devil Bats and Alexanders.^{[ch. 278]}

==== Kengo Mizumachi ====
Voiced by: Daisuke Ono

Kengo Mizumachi (水町 健吾, Mizumachi Kengo) is the main lineman of the Kyoshin Poseidon. During middle school, he was known as a genius with a natural gift for sports, being requested by several teams. He joins and becomes a champion at the swimming club, but he quits due to his teammates lacking the drive to win; he is eventually recruited by Kakei to the American football team.^{[ch. 117]} Later, he serves as a personal coach for Koji Kuroki during the Devil Bats' preparation for the Christmas Bowl.^{[ch. 278]} At the end of the series, he is shown to be attending Enma University.^{[ch. 333]}

=== Bando Spiders ===
The Bando Spiders (盤戸スパイダーズ, Bando Supaidāzu) are a team of specialists that focus on scoring through field goals. One year prior the series' events, most of its members were recruited away by the Teikoku Alexanders after the team achieved the second place in the Tokyo Tournament.^{[ch. 159]} The team's main player is Kotaro Sasaki, the one responsible for scoring, who has the help of Hayato Akaba, the one in charge for blocking the adversaries. The team is managed by Juri Sawai, (Note: 沢井 ジュリ, Sawai Juri) a childhood friend of Kotaro.^{[ch. 160]}

==== Hayato Akaba ====
Voiced by: Daisuke Hirakawa

Hayato Akaba (赤羽 隼人, Akaba Hayato) is the tight end and the captain of the Spiders. He is obsessed with music, often plays his electric guitar, and uses musical metaphors to state his opinions.^{[ch. 152]} A year before the start of the series, Akaba was named MVP in the fall Tokyo Tournament,^{[ch. 152]} which attracted the attention of Teikoku Alexanders.^{[ch. 159]} He joined the Alexanders and was given the title of Eyeshield 21 by {{#Takeru Yamato|Takeru Yamato}} who had retired the name, but soon he decided to return to Bando. Because of this last minute change, Akaba is banned from playing for six months due to the school's policy, and during this time he is devoted to studying new tactics to teach his teammates.^{[ch. 158, 169]} He introduces himself for the match against the Devil Bats as "the real Eyeshield 21".^{[ch. 155]} After his team is defeated, he officially hands Sena the Eyeshield 21 title and serves as a personal coach for Natsuhiko Taki during the Devil Bats' preparation for the Christmas Bowl.^{[ch. 278]} Akaba is also recruited for Team Japan during the World Tournament. At the end of the series, he is shown to be attending Saikyodai University.^{[ch. 333]}

==== Kotaro Sasaki ====
Voiced by: Eiji Moriyama

Kotaro Sasaki (佐々木 コータロー, Sasaki Kōtarō) is the kicker of the Bando Spiders. A skilled kicker, he has an average of 100% success of converting extra points.^{[ch. 55]} However, he aims to hold the title of the best kicker in Japan and then he wants to face Musashi as he heard the urban legend of Musashi's sixty-yard field goal.^{[ch. 55, 57]} Due to his abilities, Sasaki is invited to join the Teikoku Alexanders, but rejected the offer to stay with Hayato Akaba.^{[ch. 159]} At the end of the series, he is shown to be attending Enma University.^{[ch. 333]}

=== Hakushu Dinosaurs ===
The Hakushu Dinosaurs (白秋ダイナソーズ, Hakushū Dainosōzu) are a team from the SIC region (Saitama, Ibaraki, and Chiba), participating for the first time in the Kantō Tournament. Its members include Reiji Maruko, the quarterback and captain, Rikiya Gao, the main lineman, Hiromi Kisaragi (Note: 如月 ヒロミ, Kisaragi Hiromi,) the wide receiver who is considered the team's left arm,^{[ch. 255]} Hanataka Tengu, (Note: 天狗 花隆, Tengu Hanataka) the team's former "ace",^{[ch. 244, 245]} Saburo Mitsui, (Note: 三ツ井 三郎, Mitsui Saburō) the kicker who proclaims himself the third best,^{[ch. 263]} and Maruko Himuro, (Note: 氷室 丸子, Himuro Maruko) the club's manager who although admires Marco's ambition does not appreciate his methods to win.^{[ch. 268]}

==== Reiji Maruko ====
Voiced by: Tomokazu Sugita

Reiji Maruko (円子令司, Maruko Reiji) is the quarterback and captain of the Hakushu Dinosaurs. He is the son of a former organized crime member and calls himself Marco (マルコ), because he thinks his name sounds like that of a girl's.^{[ch. 168, 178]} Marco is an ambitious man who aspires to be the best and win the Christmas Bowl. To do this, and to impress Himuro he trains hard. However, his teammates encourage him to quit after seeing the strength of the Teikoku Alexanders. Obsessed for winning, he recruits Rikiya Gao, even against the will of Himuro.^{[ch. 268]}

==== Rikiya Gao ====
Voiced by: Tsuyoshi Koyama

Rikiya Gao (峨王 力哉, Gaō Rikiya) is the strongest lineman of college football in Japan. Despite being a rookie, he holds the Japanese bench press record with over two hundred kilograms. Due to his enormous strength, he breaks regular mouthpieces, causing him to use one made of a titanium alloy.^{[ch. 200, 201]} He is considered to be a monster by his opponents, having injured the quarterback of all teams he has faced until the match against Taiyo Sphinx.^{[ch. 201, 202]} Despite always wanting a power match, Gao respects all the rules and has respect for those who face him.^{[ch. 202, 251]} After his high school years, he joins the semi-pro football club Takekura Babels in the X-League.^{[ch. 333]} Inagaki was inspired to create him after watching an NFL match, where he thought the players "were facing dinosaurs".

=== Other ===
==== Rui Habashira ====
Voiced by: Kōji Yusa

Rui Habashira (葉柱 ルイ, Habashira Rui) is a linebacker and the captain of the Zokugaku Chameleons, (Note: 賊学カメレオンズ, Zokugaku Kamereonzu) a team whose members are mainly delinquents led by him. Habashira is the son of a senator; as such, he can allow players, who should be under police custody, to play games.^{[ch. 26]} He acts like a thug in order to gain respect from his teammates, and he forces them to practice through threats and violence. However, he is the only one in the team who really cares about American football.^{[ch. 110]} He enters the international tournament as the "Mummy Man" in order to play while also making sure his teammates are not thinking he is wasting time.^{[ch. 329]}

==== Onihei Yamamoto ====
Voiced by: Taiten Kusunoki

Onihei Yamamoto (山本鬼兵, Yamamoto Onihei) is a lineman the captain of the Hashiratani Deers. (Note: 柱谷ディアーズ, Hashiratani Diāzu) He is greatly admired and respected by other linemen, especially Ryokan Kurita. He is very powerful despite his small body, and is known for his great technique and experience.^{[ch. 106]} After the elimination of his team from the Autumn Tournament by Kyoshin Poseidon, he befriends Torakichi, who quite accurately believes, after observing some of Onihei's predictions, that anything that Onihei predicts is wrong.^{[ch. 142]}

==== Devil Bat ====
Devil Bat (デビルバット, Debiru Batto) is the main mascot of the Deimon Devil Bats. It is a bat-like creature with red coloration, horns and tail similar to the common stereotype of the devil. Devil Bat usually appears to explain the rules of American football to the audience.^{[ch. 12]} It has a small, cute-looking, lighter-colored version called Little Devil Bat (コデビバ, Kodebiba) who assists him.^{[ch. 135]} Murata remarked that Devil Bat "bears a strong resemblance to Hiruma." Devil Bat's seyū is DJ Taro, while Shoko Nagakawa voiced Little Devil Bat.

==== Cerberus ====
Cerberus (ケルベロス, Keruberosu) is Hiruma's dog and one of the Devil Bats' mascots. In the manga, Hiruma finds the dog on a rainy day while placing flyers and is attracted to take it with him because of its fierce look.^{[ch. 196]} Differently, in the anime, Cerberus appears in the training field, Hiruma challenges it, and after succeeding in putting the collar on it, the canine starts to obey Hiruma's commands. Hiruma often uses Cerberus to frighten his adversaries as well as his own teammates.^{[ch. 15, 27]} Cerberus is also used to help to keep Sena's secret identity; for example, with some pet food in a bowl, a Sena doll, and a camera, Hiruma can make it appear that Sena is recording games, while in fact, he is playing as Eyeshield.^{[ch. 42]}

==== Torakichi ====
Voiced by: Mika Ito

Torakichi (虎吉) is a grade-school fan of Sakuraba, who wishes to become a player after witnessing Sakaruba catching a very high pass. Even when Sakuraba says he caught that pass by accident and when Torakichi learns Sakuraba is really a sub-par player, Torakichi remains a loyal fan and encourages him to become stronger. Torakichi plays flag football until he is hospitalized with a broken leg, which leaves him unable to play football for up to two years. He almost gives up on his dream, but he is inspired by Sakaruba to continue with his rehabilitation.^{[ch. 38]}.

==== Kumabukuro, Sanada and Riko ====
Voiced by: Shingo Yatsuda (Kumabukuro), DJ Taro (Sanda), Mariya Ise (Riko)

"Bomberhead" Kumabukuro (ボンバーヘッド熊袋, Bonbā Heddo Kumabukuro) and "Machine Gun" Sanada (マシンガン真田, Mashingan Sanada) are, respectively, the official commentator and the announcer of American football games. Kumabukuro is a retired American football player, who becomes a reporter for the American Football Monthly magazine.^{[ch. 39, 43]} Kumabukuro's daughter, Riko (リコ), is a 16-year-old girl studying to become a sports reporter.^{[ch. 169]} Riko replaces her father as Sanada's commentating partner from the Kantō Tournament onward.^{[ch. 173]}

==== Masaru Honjo ====
Voiced by: Yusei Oda and Ichiro Mikami

Masaru Honjo (本庄勝, Honjō Masaru) is a former baseball player of the Shuei Bears team. He played as an outfielder and was known for his extraordinary catches, which leads Monta to become his fan.^{[ch. 23]} After retiring from baseball, he became a chairman of Kansai's High School Football Association after being invited by a friend, the head commissioner of Kanto's High School Football Association, who believes Honjo's presence would help to attract fans.^{[ch. 226, 306]}

==== Nakabo Akira ====
Nakabo Akira (中坊明, Nakabō Akira), most known as Chubo (チューボー, Chūbō), is a middle school student, who admires Sena and wishes to become an American football player after seeing him. He attempts to try out for the Japanese team for the international tournament by copying Sena's moves. Though he is initially laughed at, he shows that he can use the "Delta Dynamite", a blocking technique that involves ramming the enemy with the head, shoulder, and fist simultaneously in a delta shape, which makes the block three times more powerful. He becomes a prominent lineman on the team, though if his timing is messed up, he is very weak on the field.

==== Team USA ====
Team USA is coached by former NFL star Morgan, (Note: モーガン, Mōgan) who will pay 300 million yen to the MVP from the world tournament's winning team and sign him to his NFL team, San Antonio Armadillos. (Note: サン アントニオ・アルマジロズ, San Antonio Arumajirozu) Five first-string players for Team USA share the title of "Pentagram", named for the stars on the American flag. These five players are regarded as the top candidates for the MVP award. The team is formed by Donald "Mr. Don" Oberman, (Note: ドナルド・オバーマン ｢Mr.ドン｣, Donarudo Obāman (Mr. Don)) the lineman and the leader of Team USA and the son of the president; Panther of the Shuttles is the running back of the team; Clifford D. Lewis, (Note: クリフォード・D・ルイス, Kurifuōdo Di Ruisu) the arrogant quarterback, who is known as the "Invincible Gambler", (Note: 不敗の勝負師, Fuhai no Shōbu-shi) Bud Walker, (Note: バッド・ウォーカー, Baddo Uōkā) the cornerback and an action movie star in Hollywood, and Tatanka, (Note: タタンカ) the Native American linebacker, who is known as the "Human Dome" (Note: 人間ドーム, Ningen Dōmu) as he is the tallest player within the tournament.

==== Eyeshield 21 ====
Eyeshield 21 (アイシールド21, Aishīrudo Nijūichi) is the title of the best runner of a generation. At the start of the series, Hiruma assigns this name to Sena to frighten his adversaries by claiming he is the running back who came from Notre Dame to Japan. "Eyeshield 21" is in fact not a person but a tradition of the (fictional) high school affiliated to the University of Notre Dame to distinguish the best player of the team by awarding them with a distinctive blue eyeshield and the number "21" for their jersey.^{[ch. 163]} Shun Kakei, however, reveals that he had met the "real" Eyeshield 21 when he was in the United States, and he returned to Japan to search him and denounces Sena as a fraud.^{[ch. 112]} During the match between Deimon Devil Bats and Bando Spiders, Akaba Hayato is revealed to be the "official" carrier of the Eyeshield 21 title; after being defeated by Sena and the Devil Bats, Akaba passes the title onto him.^{[ch. 166]} However, the "real" Eyeshield 21 that Akaba previously inherited the title from is revealed to be Takeru Yamato, the true identity of the person Kakei met in the United States. When he meets Sena, Yamato declares that whoever wins the Christmas Bowl between the Deimon Devil Bats and the Teikoku Alexanders will be the one who deserves the title.^{[ch. 287]}

== Reception ==
The characters of Eyeshield 21 have been well received from publications dedicated to anime, manga, and other media. Deb Aoki from About.com said that one of the best things about Eyeshield 21 are "the well-written, distinctive and loveable characters", while Zac Bertschy from Anime News Network (ANN) stated the characters are "perhaps the strongest element [of the series]". Carlo Santos from ANN praised the "appealing characters" and the "well-defined cast of characters". Christina Koh of The Star asserted "Each character is drawn with a distinct look", while Santos commended their distinguishable physical characteristics, and their design, which, "of course, are a feat of imagination." Santos affirmed the series has "hilarious characters", while Scott Campbell from Active Anime said the characters "also possess a lot of ability to make the reader laugh".

Scott Green of Ain't It Cool News described the characters "recognizable as people" and praised Eyeshield 21, for "taking the personal relationships a little less serious, but going a bit overboard with the motion and personalities". Mania.com's Jarred Pine classified the characters as "very likeable", and said that because they have "their own personalities" they "are instantly memorable". Chris Zimmerman from Comic Book Bin praised the development of the characters through the manga series. Chris Homer of The Fandom Post also commended the characters' development in the anime series and said that some of them, such as Ikkyu and Ishimaru, were better developed in comparison to the manga. Homer praised how the rivals were full integrated in the main story and how their back stories were explored. Santos commented, "Just as thrilling as the game highlights are the individual stories and rivalries behind each player". On the other hand, Eyeshield 21 has a lot of teams with different themes and according to Chris Beveridge from Mania.com some times "the theme is used more than it should" and that "it just feels very forced".

== Notes and references ==
Japanese

Bibliography
Eyeshield 21 manga volumes by Inagaki, Riichiro and Murata, Yusuke. Original Japanese version published by Shueisha. English translation published by Viz Media.

1. Vol. 1 (ch. 1–7): 光速の脚を持つ男. December 20, 2002. ISBN 978-4-08-873370-8. (in Japanese). and The Boy With the Golden Legs. April 5, 2005. ISBN 978-1-59116-752-5. (in English).
2. Vol. 2 (ch. 8–16): インチキ·ヒーロー. March 4, 2003. ISBN 978-4-08-873398-2. (in Japanese). and The False Hero. May 31, 2005. ISBN 978-1-59116-809-6. (in English).
3. Vol. 3 (ch. 17–25): その名は泥門デビルバッツ. June 4, 2003. ISBN 978-4-08-873439-2. (in Japanese). and And They're Called the Devil Bats. August 2, 2005. ISBN 978-1-59116-874-4. (in English).
4. Vol. 4 (ch. 26–34): ビビらした男. August 4, 2003. ISBN 978-4-08-873498-9. (in Japanese). and And They're Called the Devil Bats. October 10, 2005. ISBN 978-1-4215-0074-4. (in English).
5. Vol. 5 (ch. 35–43): POWERFUL. October, 2003. ISBN 978-4-08-873519-1. (in Japanese). and Powerful. December 6, 2005. ISBN 978-1-4215-0113-0. (in English).
6. Vol. 6 (ch. 44–52): 跳べデビルバット. December 19, 2003. ISBN 978-4-08-873553-5. (in Japanese). and Devil Bats Take Flight. February 7, 2006. ISBN 978-1-4215-0274-8. (in English).
7. Vol. 7 (ch. 53–61): その男ムサシ. March 4, 2004. ISBN 978-4-08-873578-8. (in Japanese). and Musashi. April 4, 2006. ISBN 978-1-4215-0405-6. (in English).
8. Vol. 8 (ch. 62–70): 戦士何故強者を望む. April 30, 2004. ISBN 978-4-08-873598-6. (in Japanese). and True Warriors Seek Out Strong Foes. June 6, 2006. ISBN 978-1-4215-0637-1. (in English).
9. Vol. 9 (ch. 71–79): 地獄に惚れた男達. August 4, 2004. ISBN 978-4-08-873641-9. (in Japanese). and Hell Is for Devil Bats. August 1, 2006. ISBN 978-1-4215-0638-8. (in English).
10. Vol. 10 (ch. 80–88): 負け犬はいるか. October 4, 2004. ISBN 978-4-08-873663-1. (in Japanese). and Is There a Loser in the House?. October 3, 2006. ISBN 978-1-4215-0639-5. (in English).
11. Vol. 11 (ch. 89–97): 大戦開幕. December 3, 2004. ISBN 978-4-08-873683-9. (in Japanese). and Open Season. December 5, 2006. ISBN 978-1-4215-0640-1. (in English).
12. Vol. 12 (ch. 98–106): デビルバットゴースト. March 5, 2005. ISBN 978-4-08-873778-2. (in Japanese). and Devil Bat Ghost. February 6, 2007. ISBN 978-1-4215-1061-3. (in English).
13. Vol. 13 (ch. 107–115): 本物は誰だ. May 2, 2005. ISBN 978-4-08-873805-5. (in Japanese). and Who Is the Real Eyeshield 21?. April 3, 2007. ISBN 978-1-4215-1062-0. (in English).
14. Vol. 14 (ch. 116–124): 海の神VS悪魔. July 4, 2005. ISBN 978-4-08-873850-5. (in Japanese). and The Demons vs. the Gods of the Sea. June 5, 2007. ISBN 978-1-4215-1063-7. (in English).
15. Vol. 15 (ch. 125–133): 東京最強の戦士たち. September 2, 2005. ISBN 978-4-08-873829-1. (in Japanese). and The Toughest Warriors in Tokyo. August 7, 2007. ISBN 978-1-4215-1064-4. (in English).
16. Vol. 16 (ch. 134–142): タイムアウトの夜明け. November 4, 2005. ISBN 978-4-08-873874-1. (in Japanese). and Dawn of the Time-Out. October 2, 2007. ISBN 978-1-4215-1065-1 (in English).
17. Vol. 17 (ch. 143–151): 最強への渇き. January 5, 2006. ISBN 978-4-08-874006-5. (in Japanese). and The Drive to Be the Best. December 4, 2007. ISBN 978-1-4215-1166-5 (in English).
18. Vol. 18 (ch. 152–160): 小早川瀬那. March 3, 2006. ISBN 978-4-08-874028-7. (in Japanese). and Sena Kobayakawa. February 5, 2008. ISBN 978-1-4215-1544-1 (in English).
19. Vol. 19 (ch. 161–169): 継ぐ者. June 2, 2006. ISBN 978-4-08-874107-9. (in Japanese). and The Successor. April 1, 2008. ISBN 978-1-4215-1624-0 (in English).
20. Vol. 20 (ch. 170–178): Devils vs. Gods. August 4, 2006. ISBN 978-4-08-874141-3. (in Japanese). and Devils vs. Gods. June 3, 2008. ISBN 978-1-4215-1625-7 (in English).
21. Vol. 21 (ch. 179–187): 11人居る!!. October 4, 2006. ISBN 978-4-08-874264-9. (in Japanese). and They Were 11!. August 5, 2008. ISBN 978-1-4215-1626-4 (in English).
22. Vol. 22 (ch. 188–196): Time-out 0. December 4, 2006. ISBN 978-4-08-874290-8. (in Japanese). and Time-out 0. October 7, 2008. ISBN 978-1-4215-1955-5 (in English).
23. Vol. 23 (ch. 197–205): そして決戦へ. February 2, 2007. ISBN 978-4-08-874316-5. (in Japanese). and Then Came the Showdown!. December 2, 2008. ISBN 978-1-4215-1956-2 (in English).
24. Vol. 24 (ch. 206–214): 無敵城塞. April 4, 2007. ISBN 978-4-08-874340-0. (in Japanese). and The Indomitable Fortress. February 3, 2009. ISBN 978-1-4215-2393-4 (in English).
25. Vol. 25 (ch. 215–223): Perfect Player. July 4, 2007. ISBN 978-4-08-874383-7. (in Japanese). and Perfect Player. April 7, 2009. ISBN 978-1-4215-2394-1 (in English).
26. Vol. 26 (ch. 224–232): 格闘球技. September 4, 2007. ISBN 978-4-08-874412-4. (in Japanese). and Rough 'n' Tumble. June 2, 2009. ISBN 978-1-4215-2621-8 (in English).
27. Vol. 27 (ch. 233–241): 小早川瀬那 vs. 進 清十郎. November 2, 2007. ISBN 978-4-08-874433-9. (in Japanese). and Seijuro Shin vs. Sena Kobayakawa. August 4, 2009. ISBN 978-1-4215-2622-5 (in English).
28. Vol. 28 (ch. 242–250): 決戦の東京ドーム. February 4, 2008. ISBN 978-4-08-874474-2. (in Japanese). and Tokyo Dome of the Decisive Battle. October 6, 2009. ISBN 1-4215-2623-9 (in English).
29. Vol. 29 (ch. 251–259): 二代目のクォーターバック. April 4, 2008. ISBN 978-4-08-874495-7. (in Japanese). and The Second Quarterback. December 1, 2009. ISBN 1-4215-2776-6 (in English).
30. Vol. 30 (ch. 260–268): This Is American Football. June 4, 2008. ISBN 978-4-08-874523-7. (in Japanese). and This Is American Football. February 2, 2010. ISBN 1-4215-2813-4 (in English).
31. Vol. 31 (ch. 269–277): And the Winner Is.... August 4, 2008. ISBN 978-4-08-874553-4. (in Japanese). and And the Winner Is.... April 6, 2010. ISBN 1-4215-2927-0 (in English).
32. Vol. 32 (ch. 278–286): Xmas BOWL. November 4, 2008. ISBN 978-4-08-874590-9. (in Japanese). and Xmas Bowl. July 6, 2010. ISBN 1-4215-3162-3 (in English).
33. Vol. 33 (ch. 287–295): 悪魔のミス. January 5, 2009. ISBN 978-4-08-874616-6. (in Japanese). and The Devil's Mistake. October 5, 2010. ISBN 1-4215-3231-X (in English).
34. Vol. 34 (ch. 296–305): The Last of the Deimon Devilbats. March 4, 2009. ISBN 978-4-08-874641-8. (in Japanese). and The Last of the Deimon Devilbats. January 4, 2011. ISBN 1-4215-3306-5 (in English).
35. Vol. 35 (ch. 306–315): The World Is Mine. May 1, 2009. ISBN 978-4-08-874664-7. (in Japanese). and The World Is Mine. April 5, 2011. ISBN 1-4215-3577-7 (in English).
36. Vol. 36 (ch. 316–324): Sena vs. Panther. August 4, 2009. ISBN 978-4-08-874713-2. (in Japanese). and Sena vs. Panther. July 5, 2011. ISBN 1-4215-3684-6 (in English).
37. Vol. 37 (ch. 325–333): Ready Set Hut. October 2, 2009. ISBN 978-4-08-874735-4. (in Japanese). and Ready Set Hut. October 4, 2011. ISBN 978-1-4215-3685-9 (in English).
