= Sena Kobayakawa =

Fictional character from Eyeshield 21

- Eyeshield 21 character
- Sena in the manga
- First appearance: Eyeshield 21 Chapter 1: The Boy with the Golden Legs
- Voiced by: Japanese; Miyu Irino; Romi Park (Jump Festa); Kokoro Kikuchi (younger); English; Yuri Lowenthal

In-universe information
- Alias: Eyeshield 21
- Relatives: Mihae Kobayakawa (mother); Shiyuma Kobayakawa (father)
- Position: Running back Safety; Quarterback (temporarily)
- Team: Deimon Devil Bats; Enma Fires

Sena Kobayakawa (Japanese: 小早川 瀬那, Hepburn: Kobayakawa Sena), commonly referred to just as Sena (セナ), is a fictional character who is the protagonist in the manga and anime series Eyeshield 21, created by Riichiro Inagaki and Yusuke Murata. In the series, he is a first-year Japanese high-school student who becomes a gofer to avoid being bullied. His running ability is noticed by Yoichi Hiruma, the school's American football team's captain, who gets him to join the Deimon Devil Bats as the team's running back under the name "Eyeshield 21". Sena has appeared in other media from the series, including video games, original video animations (OVAs) and light novels.

When he created a protagonist to the series, Inagaki intended to create a "wimp" who is a good athlete, then he decided the series main theme, American football, and eventually created Sena. In the 2003 anime OVA which preceded the anime series, he is voiced by Romi Park; however, she was replaced by Miyu Irino in the 2005 Japanese anime television series. In the English adaptation, he is voiced by Yuri Lowenthal. Sena has been well received by manga and anime publications. Merchandise has been created for the character, including action figures, cosplay pieces and resin and ceramic statues.

== Development and voice portrayal ==
When Inagaki was planning the Eyeshield 21 series, he wanted to create a "protagonist that was wimpy at the beginning, yet could perform outstandingly in a sports game"; from this premise, he choose American football as the main theme, eventually creating Sena. Inagaki has said that he is a fan of the St. Louis Rams and Marshall Faulk (a running back on the Rams). Inagaki said that seeing how Faulk ran inspired him to create the character. He chose Sena's name as an homage to the Brazilian Formula One driver Ayrton Senna.

In the first adaptation of the Eyeshield 21 manga, a 2003 Jump Festa OVA titled The Phantom Golden Bowl, he was voiced by voice actress Romi Park. The subsequently adaptation, however, did not use Park; rather Miyu Irino was chosen to be Sena's voice actor. Kokoro Kikuchi provided his voice while his younger self. In the English dubbing, the role has been played by Yuri Lowenthal.

== Appearances ==
=== In Eyeshield 21 ===
Because of his diminutive stature and weak appearance, Sena is bullied by his classmates in primary school; he is protected by Mamori Anezaki, his only friend. A new student, Riku Kaitani, teaches Sena how to outsprint his tormentors. Unfortunately, Sena uses his running ability to be a gofer, which allows him to improve his running and dodging ability. Soon after entering Deimon high school Sena is coerced into playing American football by Yoichi Hiruma, who recognizes Sena's running ability and forces him to join the school's American football club, the Deimon Devil Bats. To conceal his identity Sena and to keep him from being recruited by other teams, Sena wears a green eyeshield and Hiruma gives him the alias "Eyeshield 21" after a famous Japanese high school athlete in the United States.

The Deimon Devil Bats enter the spring tournament; after winning a comeback victory in their first game they then lose to the Ojo White Knights, but the inexperienced Sena is able to outrun Ojo's star linebacker Seijuro Shin before collapsing from exhaustion, earning the latter's respect. Despite Deimon's elimination, Sena decides to stay on the team because he finds the sport fun.

Sena and the Devil Bats prepare for the autumn tournament, hoping to be the best team in Tokyo to advance to the Kanto tournament and eventually the Christmas Bowl (the national championship between the best high-school American football teams from the Kanto and Kansai regions). The Devil Bats spend their time playing several exhibition games and recruiting new members to the team, including wide receiver Taro "Monta" Raimon who becomes best friends with Sena. The Devil Bats eventually lose a match against the visiting NASA Aliens from the United States but Sena befriends the team's ball boy turned running back Patrick "Panther" Spencer and the two promise to play each other again on the field.

For the team's summer training, Sena and the Devil Bats take a vacation to NASA's hometown of Houston, where they meet Hiruma's and Kurita's former mentor Doburoku Sakaki, who reluctantly allows Hiruma's request to put the team through a dangerous training regimen known as the "Death March"-which involves traveling on foot from Houston to Las Vegas through the Mojave Desert. Before participating in the Death March, Sena reveals his identity to the rest of his teammates (with the exception of Mamori, who traveled with the team to America but was not present during Sena's reveal). During the Death March, Sena accidentally takes a detour to San Antonio where he meets Suzuna Taki and her brother Natsuhiko at the city's NFL's team's open tryouts. The Taki siblings accompany the Devil Bats for the remainder of the Death March, with Natsuhiko becoming the team's tight end and Suzuna as the head of their cheerleading squad. The Devil Bats successfully complete the Death March and return to Japan to compete in the fall tournament; during training, Sena develops a new technique called the "Devil Bat Ghost"—a unique juke that creates an afterimage of himself—which later becomes his signature move.

Deimon wins their first games in the fall tournament thanks to Sena's improved skills. While facing the Kyoshin Poseidon in the quarterfinals, Sena learns from their star player Shun Kakei that his Eyeshield 21 identity belonged to another footballer of Japanese descent from Notre Dame High School's football team in America. Sena is reunited with Riku, who plays for the Seibu Wild Gunmen. Deimon loses in the semifinals against Seibu but are given a chance to qualify for the Kantō tournament if they can win a consolation game against the Bando Spiders. After learning that Bando's team captain Hayato Akaba is supposedly the real Eyeshield 21, Sena reveals his identity to Mamori and the general public before the game between Deimon and Bando. When Deimon wins, Akaba officially names Sena as Eyeshield 21 and reveals that the name is in fact a title traditionally passed down to Notre Dame's best runner.

During the Kanto tournament, Sena makes several accomplishments in Deimon's games—including handing the Shinryuji Naga's prodigy player Agon Kongo his first defeat; and facing off against Shin again in Deimon's rematch against Ojo. When Hiruma's throwing arm is injured by Rikiya Gao during the game against the Hakushu Dinosaurs, Sena briefly fills in as quarterback. The Devil Bats win the Kanto tournament to play in the Christmas bowl and Sena is named as the tournament's MVP.

For the Christmas Bowl, the Devil Bats face off against the undefeated Teikoku Alexanders, who are led by Takeru Yamato, the original Japanese Eyeshield 21. In the game, Sena proves his right to the Eyeshield 21 name by defeating Yamato and winning the championship. After winning the Christmas Bowl, Sena is asked by Japan's high school football committee to create a national team with Monta, Yamato and Taka Honjo. The four split up to find players for a Japanese team for the International Youth American Football tournament. At the World Tournament held in New York City, Sena and Team Japan advance to the finals against the U.S., where Sena once again faces against Panther; the game ends in a tie but Panther is named MVP and is given a contract to the NFL. In Sena's second year, he replaces Hiruma as Deimon's team captain and during his third year is invited to attend Notre Dame in the U.S., bringing his Eyeshield 21 identity to full circle. He returns to Japan to attend Enma College, opposing some of his former teammates and rivals (students at other colleges or employees at several company teams) as they compete to play in the Rice Bowl (the game between the best college team and the best semi-pro team).

Some time later, Sena is chosen as one of two candidates from Japan for an open spot through the NFL's International Player Pathway Program, with the other being Hiruma. To determine who will receive the spot, Sena and Hiruma play against each other with their respective college teams in the Koshien Bowl (the national college championship game between East Japan and West Japan). In the game's final seconds, Sena manages to outrun every one of the Saikyodai Wizards' opposing players, securing a victory for the Enma Fires, however the winner of the IPPP's spot is never revealed.

=== In other media ===
Sena has made several appearances outside the Eyeshield 21 anime and manga. He appears in both of the original video animations produced for the series: helping the Deimon Devil Bats to defeat the Uraharajuku Boarders in the Golden Bowl in the first OVA, and surviving on a desert island (after Hiruma leaves him and his teammates to train) in the second. As the series' title character, Sena is playable in all Eyeshield 21 games. These usually feature the manga's original story, but Eyeshield 21: Devilbats Devildays features other storylines. In Eyeshield 21: Max Devil Power!, Sena can play for teams other than the Devil Bats. He also appears in the crossover games Jump Super Stars and Jump Ultimate Stars as a supporting character.

== Reception ==
The character of Sena has been well received by manga readers and as the series continued he went on to become one of the most popular characters among the Eyeshield 21 reader base, having consistently placed near the top of the Weekly Shōnen Jump character popularity polls of the series. In the first poll he placed first, and second in two others (behind Hiruma). He was also chosen by the readers the one who would win a "Stars Showdown" against Seijuro Shin, as well as the best running back in the series. In an interview, Miyu Irino said about Sena: "he can be pathetic and weak" but "in case of emergency" Sena can be "incredibly cool". Merchandise based on his character has been released, including action figures, cosplay pieces, and resin and ceramic statues.

Several publications for manga and anime have commented on Sena's character. Ain't It Cool News' Scott Green qualified Sena as "a rather likable put upon hero and visually interesting lead". Carlo Santos of Anime News Network (ANN) noted Sena fell into "the archetypal shōnen protagonist" and "the underdog who falls and gets up over and over again" mold, but praised Sena, calling him "the polar opposite of those talkative, obnoxious, up-and-at-'em heroes that populate so many other series". Writing for Mania.com, Jarred Pine also called Sena an archetypical character but noted him as a "very likeable" character. Pine praised his debut, saying that it "was a memorable one, as it was both intense and hilarious". Later, he stated that a lead you can cheer for is essential to a sports manga, commenting that Sena "fills that role quite well." The contrast with "Sena's hard effort and Hiruma's trickery and devilish nature" was also praised by Pine. His doormat characteristics was initially "worrying" according to Manga Life's Kevin Hill who said he became "far more likeable" once he meets up Hiruma and Kurita. Zac Bertschy of ANN said that Sena, "unlike so many other shōnen sports heroes, stops moping around and doubting himself and generally tries his damndest"; he is "introspective, kind, and resourceful, something most shōnen heroes can't claim by the third volume of their respective series". Chris Homer of The Fandom Post also shared the feeling that Sena is a "typical protagonist", but remarked how he develops into a more confident character, which "is key to the series" and makes him "a more than acceptable protagonist".
