= Yoichi Hiruma =

Fictional character from Eyeshield 21

- Eyeshield 21 character
- Yoichi Hiruma
- First appearance: Eyeshield 21 manga chapter 1
- Voiced by: Japanese; Atsushi Tamura; Shin-ichiro Miki (Jump Festa); English; Derek Stephen Prince

In-universe information
- Relatives: Yuya Hiruma (father)
- Position: Quarterback
- Team: Deimon Devil Bats; Saikyoudai Wizards

Yoichi Hiruma (Japanese: 蛭魔 妖一, Hepburn: Hiruma Yōichi), commonly referred to just as Hiruma (ヒル魔), is a fictional character in the anime and manga series Eyeshield 21, created by Riichiro Inagaki and Yusuke Murata. In the series, he is the captain of the Deimon Devil Bats, a high school American football club founded by him and two other students. Due to the lack of interest in the sport, Hiruma uses blackmail and threats to recruit players to Devil Bats. Hiruma witnesses Sena Kobayakawa's running abilities and forces the boy to join the team as the running back as soon as he can. Hiruma has appeared in other media from the series, including video games, original video animations (OVAs), and light novels.

According to Inagaki, Hiruma was created to be a "devil-hero", or a kind of anti-hero. Due to this, Murata, the manga's illustrator, tried to give Hiruma a demonic appearance. In the OVA, released before the anime's start, he is voiced by Shin-ichiro Miki. However, in the 2005 Japanese anime television series, he was replaced by Atsushi Tamura, who was chosen by the manga series creators due to his voice, which they believed was perfect for the role. His voice actor in the English adaptation is Derek Stephen Prince. Hiruma has been well received by publications for manga and anime. Numerous pieces of merchandise in Hiruma's likeness have also been released, including decals and statues of ceramic and resin.

== Development and voice portrayal ==
Riichiro Inagaki, the writer of Eyeshield 21, has said that he developed Hiruma as a character that does not follow the Japanese concepts of emphasis on sportsmanship and effort in the game; instead, Hiruma is "only concerned with winning". Inagaki intended to make an "anti-hero" or, as he refers to the concept, a "devil-hero". Yusuke Murata, the artist, chose to portray Hiruma as looking "close to being a demon", since he heard from Inagaki that Hiruma had "the personality of a demon." Murata has noted that the Devil Bats logo "bears a strong resemblance to Hiruma". Inagaki also stated that Hiruma's name is a homage to the British former Formula One driver Damon Hill. (Note: The Japanese name of Damon Hill can be written both as "デイモン・ヒル" or "デーモン・ヒル"; so, his first name may be spelled in the same way the English word "demon" is written in katakana ("デーモン"). Inagaki inverted Damon Hill's Japanese name and changed the katakana for a kanji that also means "demon" ("魔") to create Hiruma's name. In summary, "デーモン・ヒル" became "ヒル・魔 (デーモン)".) He also visited a real military base to get inspiration for the one he draw when Hiruma's background is revealed.

He was voiced by Shin-ichiro Miki in the first anime adaptation of the Eyeshield 21 manga, a 2003 Jump Festa OVA titled The Phantom Golden Bowl. The subsequent television adaptation, however, did not use Miki; rather, Atsushi Tamura was chosen. Though the animation studio administrated casting, the studio asked Inagaki and Murata for their opinions. The two both felt that Tamura was a "perfect fit" due to "his voice and his style". In the English dubbing, the role was voiced by Derek Stephen Prince.

== Appearances ==
=== In Eyeshield 21 ===
Seven years prior to the start of the series, a ten-year-old Hiruma snuck into an American military base, where he witnessed a group of soldiers playing American football. He soon learned the sport's rules and managed to successfully gamble on the winning teams, accumulating a large amount of money over the years. He entered Mao Junior High, where he met another football fan Ryokan Kurita, who encouraged Hiruma to create his own team. In order to establish an American football club, Hiruma created an information network to acquire blackmail material and various firearms, allowing him to threaten the vice principal of Mao into allowing the establishment of the club; Hiruma was also able to force the vice principal into rehiring former custodian Doburoku Sakaki as their club advisor and their training coach and equipment manager. Hiruma enlisted Agon Kongo to act as an enforcer for his blackmailing schemes; it's unclear if their alliance was based on genuine friendship between the two or forced coercion on Hiruma's part but Agon slowly grew to resent Hiruma. Hiruma and Kurita befriended their classmate Gen "Musashi" Takekura, who also decided to joined their club and the three friends made a pact to win the Christmas Bowl—the high school football league championship.

The three decided to enroll at the prestigious Shinryuji High School to join the Shinryuji Naga, the best team in the Kantō region, to increase their changes of going to the Christmas Bowl. Hiruma and Musashi passed the entrance exam while Kurita failed; Kurita attempted to gain Shinryuji's sole remaining athletic scholarship to enroll but the spot is taken by Agon—despite already passing the entrance exam Agon took the scholarship due to his disdain for Kurita for being obese and to spite Hiruma. Shinryuji sided with Agon and rejected Kurita, which prompted Hiruma and Musashi to leave Shinryuji out of loyalty to Kurita and left Hiruma with a deep-seated grudge against Shinryuji and Agon. The three then enrolled at Deimon High School and together they established the Deimon Devil Bats.

Hiruma's dreams in his first year of high school were dashed when during their first game, Musashi quit the team and dropped out of school when his father was injured in a work related accident. Since then, Hiruma refused to allow anyone else to take over Musashi's vacant kicker position except for himself, despite his lack of kicking ability, which hampered the Devil Bats' special teams. Due to Deimon's remaining roster being filled with uninterested students that Hiruma blackmailed into joining, the Devil Bats had an abysmal first season and were eliminated early in both the spring and fall Tokyo tournaments. One of these losses included a 0-99 blowout to the Ojo White Knights, one of the best high school football teams in Tokyo; this left Hiruma with a burning desire defeat Ojo, along with Shinryuji, in the future.

While Hiruma never talks about his family and has outright lied or given contradictory details about his parents, it's revealed that Hiruma is estranged from his father, Yuya Hiruma, a former champion shogi and chess player who switched from his signature aggressive offensive playing style to safer defensive one after suffering too many losses and was eventually forced to retire. This possibly explains the younger Hiruma's keen insight and strategic mind, his focus on offense over defense, and his refusal accept failure and willingness to win at all costs.

At the beginning of the series, Hiruma and Kurita, now in their second year of high school, attempt to recruit new members to the Deimon Devil Bats. Due to a rule at several high schools, including Deimon, that prohibits students from participating in club activities in their third and final school year, this is the last chance for Hiruma and Kurita to participate in the Christmas Bowl. At first, their only successful recruit is Sena Kobayakawa, as Hiruma witnesses his incredible running speed and agility and forces him to be the team's running back. To prevent Sena from being recruited by other teams and to help build Deimon's reputation, Hiruma hides Sena's identity by making him wear an eyeshield and adopt the moniker "Eyeshield 21", a famous high school football player from Notre Dame High School in America. Despite winning their first game, the Devil Bats are eliminated early in the spring tournament by Ojo. Hiruma is undeterred, as the spring tournament is only secondary to the fall tournament, where the winning Tokyo area teams will then partake in the post-season Kantō tournament where the winner will then represent the region for the Christmas Bowl.

Hiruma, Sena, Kurita and the Devil Bats' team manager Mamori Anezaki use the downtime to regroup and rebuild the team. Hiruma, through intimidation, blackmail, cyber terrorism, and other similar methods, plays a crucial role in the redevelopment of the fledgling Devil Bats by using his methods to arrange several exhibition games that boost the team's popularity, garnering more public interest in the sport which allows more recruits to willingly try out the team. Hiruma's insight and strategic mind, especially his knack for devising trick plays and his psychological games, are critical in the Devil Bats' various matches. His demonic façade is also seen through Mamori, whom he shares a deep understanding with despite their constant bickering. Despite leaving Deimon, Musashi has his family's construction company build new accommodations for the Devil Bats and maintains a cordial relationship with Hiruma. When Sena and Tarō "Monta" Raimon discover Musashi's identity and past with Hiruma and Kurita, they plead for him to return to the Devil Bats but he refuses; Musashi informs Hiruma of the exchange and while amused, Hiruma respects Musashi's decision to not return.

Hiruma arranges a game with the visiting NASA Aliens from the United States after spreading a viral video mocking NASA's coach Leonard Apollo. Deimon ultimately loses and the team travels to NASA's hometown of Houston for summer vacation. While in Houston, Hiruma and Kurita are reunited with Doburoku and the Devil Bats briefly engage in a joint training session with the Seibu Wild Gunmen, who are also in America for their summer training. Hiruma begins a friendly rivalry with Sebiu's quarterback Shien "Kid" Mushanokoji with both quarterbacks acknowledging the other as the superior athlete. For the Devil Bats' summer training, Hiruma has Doburoku put the team through a dangerous training regimen known as the "Death March"—which involves traveling on foot from Houston to Las Vegas through the Mojave Desert. The Devil Bats are able to complete the Death March, which heavily improves their strength and stamina, and Hiruma uses his winnings from playing blackjack in Las Vegas to fund Deimon's traveling expenses back to Japan.

Thanks to the results of the Death March, the Devil Bats are able advance far into the Fall tournament under Hiruma's leadership. During the semifinal game against Seibu, Musashi rejoins the team midgame, which boosts the Devil Bats' morale, but Deimon loses to Seibu. However, Deimon can still qualify for the Kantō tournament if they can win the fall tournament's consolation game; Hiruma intentionally withheld this fact from the team as he didn't want them to slack off against Seibu. Deimon goes on to defeat the Bando Spiders, allowing them to participate in the Kantō tournament.

In the Kantō tournament, Deimon defeats Shinryuji in their game opener—fulfilling Hiruma's desire for revenge against the school and Agon, who is humbled by Sena and Kurita in separate matchups against them— and go on to win their rematch against Ojo in the semifinals. Unfortunately, the team's momentum almost comes to halt in the final against the Hakushu Dinosaurs when Hiruma's throwing arm is broken by Rikiya Gao, forcing Hiruma to be taken out of the game and leaving the team without a quarterback and play caller. Sena ends up filling in as quarterback and is able to hold his own until Hiruma returns to help lead the team to victory, winning the Kantō tournament and allowing the Devil Bats to advance to the Christmas Bowl against the undefeated reigning champions Teikoku Alexanders.

To prepare for the Christmas Bowl, Hiruma arranges for best players from the Tokyo and Kantō tournaments to individually train each of the Devil Bats in one-on-one sessions and uses a hyperbaric oxygen chamber (which he attaches to a segway for transportation) to heal his broken arm. Through the chamber and sheer willpower, Hiruma is able to fully heal in time for the Christmas Bowl. Unbeknownst to Hiruma, his father attends the game as a spectator. During the hard-fought and grueling championship match, Hiruma stops using numbers and facts and instead relies on his own faith in his teammates, which his father takes note of. Deimon is able to defeat Teikoku and win the Christmas Bowl, fulfilling Hiruma's lifelong dream.

After winning the Christmas Bowl, Hiruma is chosen to be one of Team Japan's two quarterbacks along with Kid for the International Youth American Football tournament due to his knack for trick plays. Hiruma quickly settles in as the main strategist on the team. Even before this, Hiruma had previously spied on Team USA in New York City to acquire information on the top five American players known as the "Pentagram", who are the favorites for the coveted MVP title, which includes an NFL contract and $3 million. In typical fashion, Hiruma refuses to permit players onto the Japanese national team out of sympathy rather than merit, including his Devil Bats teammates, but does agree with the decision to hold a final tryout as a method of enlisting bench players.

When Agon's attempt to sabotage Team Japan's first game fails, Agon confronts Hiruma and Kid to force them to hand the quarterback position to him in order to increase his chances of being named MVP in exchange for fully cooperating with the team. Hiruma refuses as the MVP title would be his only chance to play in the NFL but knows Agon is only interested in the prize money and agrees to only give him that, much to Agon's bewilderment. Before the championship game between Japan and the USA, Hiruma follows Takeru Yamato to an underground casino attended by the Pentagram and is baited into playing Texas hold 'em against their quarterback, Clifford D. Lewis. Their game ends with Hiruma folding before Clifford can reveal his winning hand and the two take each other as serious threats. In the final game, Hiruma and Agon effectively work together by using a perfected version of Shinryuji's Dragonfly formation which helps lead a comeback for Japan against America. The game ends in a tie and with no official overtime rule set in place both teams are declared winners. However neither team is satisfied with the outcome and return to the field to play again with Hiruma putting Sena in as quarterback. While the outcome is never revealed, Team USA's Panther is named MVP.

In his third and final year of high school, Hiruma retires along with Kurita and Musashi and Sena is named as the Devil Bats' new captain. Upon graduating from Deimon, the three friends decide to amicably go their separate ways, with Hiruma enrolling at Saikyoudai University, Kurita to Enma University and Musashi returning to his former job. While Hiruma joins the Saikyoudai Wizards college football team, Kurita establishes the Enma Fires and Musashi starts a football company team at his workplace called the Takeura Construction Babies; the three promise to play against each other in the Rice Bowl—the national championship game between the best college team and semi-pro team. Hiruma is later joined at Saikyoudai by Agon and Mamori along with several of his former rivals.

In his second year of college, Hiruma and the Wizards, along with several other competing college and semi-pro football teams consisting of his former teammates and rivals, attend Enma's first game of the college spring tournament when Sena returns from America to Japan after spending his final semester at Notre Dame High School to enroll at Enma. Hiruma vows to use his best plays against Sena when Saikyoudai and Enma inevitably play against each other.

Some time later, Hiruma is chosen as one of two candidates from Japan for an open spot through the NFL's International Player Pathway Program, with the other being Sena. To determine who will receive the spot, Hiruma and Sena play against each other with their college teams in the Koshien Bowl—the national college championship game between East Japan and West Japan. The night before the game, Hiruma discards his old notebook containing his blackmail material. In the game's final seconds, Sena manages to outrun every one of the Saikyodai's opposing players against Hiruma's game strategies, all but securing a victory for Enma, however the winner of the IPPP's spot is never revealed.

=== In other media ===
Hiruma has made several appearances outside of the Eyeshield 21 anime and manga. He appears in both of the original video animations produced for the series, helping the Deimon Devil Bats defeat the Uraharajuku Boarders in a tournament called the Golden Bowl in the first original video animation, and leaving his teammates on a desert island so they train in the second. Hiruma also appears in all Eyeshield 21 games, which usually feature the original manga story, except for Eyeshield 21: Devilbats Devildays, which features exclusive stories. He also appears in the crossover games Jump Super Stars and Jump Ultimate Stars as a supporting character.

== Reception ==
The character of Hiruma has been well received by manga readers, and as the series continued he went on to become one of the most popular characters among the Eyeshield 21 reader base, having consistently placed near the top of the Weekly Shōnen Jump character popularity polls of the series. In the first poll he placed second, behind Sena, but in another two he ranked first. He was also chosen by the readers as the character who would win an "Evil Showdown" against Agon Kongo, as well as the best quarterback in the series. In an interview, Atsushi Tamura said about Hiruma: "I look just like this guy"; and stated that he "think[s] there is a lot of other people who want to do the Hiruma's role". Several pieces of merchandise based on Hiruma have also been released, including decals and statues of ceramic and resin.

Several publications for manga and anime have commented on Hiruma's character. Chris Beveridge from Mania.com stated that "the outlandish nature of Hiruma with his guns blazing gets old very quickly" and considered it a "downside" to the series. On the other hand, Ain't It Cool News' Scott Green said that "impish Hiruma starts out as a unique star." Mania.com's Jarred Pine noted that Hiruma is "so completely over-the-top and out of left field that I couldn't help laughing" and that his "rude, crude, and completely unpredictable" behavior "makes his character so damn enjoyable". Pine concluded that Hiruma's personality was "instantly memorable" and his "unpredictable nature" was responsible for making the story "so enjoyable". The contrast with "Sena's hard effort and Hiruma's trickery and devilish nature" was also praised by Pine. Writing for Anime News Network (ANN), Carlo Santos praised Hiruma's character design as "imaginative" with his "lanky" and "demon-like appearance" and additionally commented that "despite his sheer ruthlessness, it's hard not to laugh as Hiruma enthusiastically resorts to blackmail in recruiting students for the team". Erin Finnegan of ANN also noted the "demonic-looking" aspect of Hiruma, saying he is "like a predecessor of Ozu from The Tatami Galaxy with a love of football". ANN's Zac Bertschy called Hiruma the "most fun" character insofar, making note of his "brash, menacing and ultimately passionate" personality and that "in a sense, Hiruma turns the 'kindly old coach-come-mentor who helps the hero along' cliché on its ear". Chris Homer of The Fandom Post considered Hiruma "the most memorable part of the show", saying he is "everyone's favourite and most memorable character". Partly because of his "sheer insanity", demonstrated by his recruiting methods, and partly because of the fact he gradually shows care and trusts for the team Homer wrote that "he is an instantly memorable character" and "so unique in this show (and any show for that matter)".
