= Bowl game =

Category of football games in North America

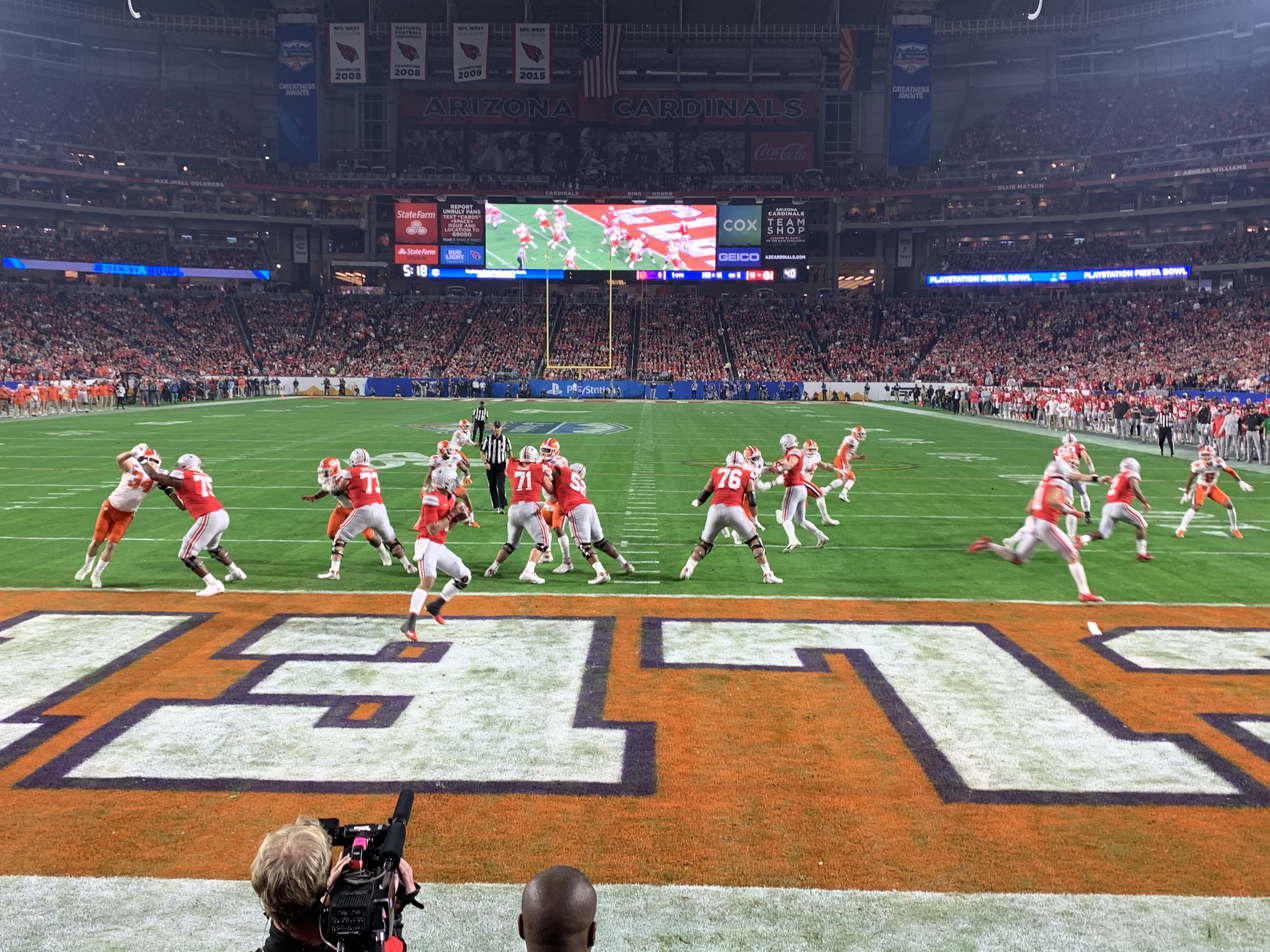
The 2019 Fiesta Bowl between Clemson and Ohio State at State Farm Stadium in Glendale, Arizona

In North America, a bowl game, or simply bowl, is one of a number of postseason college football games primarily played by NCAA Division I Football Bowl Subdivision (FBS) teams. For most of its history, the FBS did not use a playoff tournament to determine an annual national champion, instead relying on a vote by sportswriters or coaches. In place of such a playoff, cities developed regional festivals featuring bowls. Prior to 2002, bowl game statistics were not included in players' career totals. Despite moves to establish a permanent system to determine the FBS national champion on the field—such as the Bowl Coalition from 1992 to 1994, the Bowl Alliance from 1995 to 1997, the Bowl Championship Series (BCS) from 1998 to 2013, and the College Football Playoff (CFP) from 2014 through the present—some bowls are still held.

Historically, the four "major" bowl games, originally played on New Year's Day, were the Rose Bowl, Orange Bowl, Sugar Bowl, and Cotton Bowl.

Bowls originally featured the very best teams in college football, with strict bowl eligibility requirements for teams to receive invitations to participate. The number grew from 10 team-competitive (as compared to all-star) bowls in 1971 to 43 in 2023. Now the NCAA allows teams with 6–6 records and, since the 2001 season, sometimes even losing 5–6 and 5–7 seasons to participate to fill the slots. More than a quarter of 2023 bowl teams did not have winning records.

The term "bowl" originated from the Rose Bowl stadium, site of the first postseason college football games. The Rose Bowl Stadium, in turn, takes its name and bowl-shaped design from the Yale Bowl, the prototype of many football stadiums in the United States. The term has since become almost synonymous with any major American football event, generally college football, with some significant exceptions. Out of the dozens of modern bowls, two examples are the Egg Bowl, the annual game between the Mississippi State Bulldogs and the Ole Miss Rebels, and the Iron Bowl, the annual game between the Alabama Crimson Tide and the Auburn Tigers. In professional football, the National Football League (NFL) holds the Super Bowl and used to hold the Pro Bowl.

The term has crossed over into both Canadian football and North American soccer. A notable example is the annual Banjo Bowl between the Winnipeg Blue Bombers and Saskatchewan Roughriders of the Canadian Football League (CFL). In U Sports football, the two national semi-final games are named the Mitchell Bowl and the Uteck Bowl. Many North American soccer championship matches were titled the 'Soccer Bowl', including the United States men's college soccer championship from 1950 to 1952, the North American Soccer League championship from 1975 to 1984, and the North American Soccer League (II) championship from 2013 to 2017.

== History ==
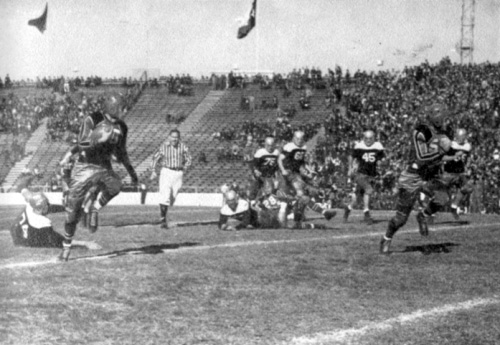
The 1939 Cotton Bowl Classic between St. Mary's and Texas Tech

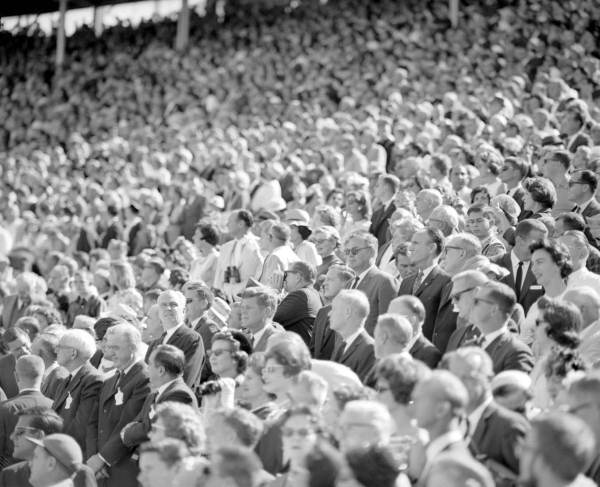
U.S. President John F. Kennedy (lower left of center) at the 1963 Orange Bowl in Miami

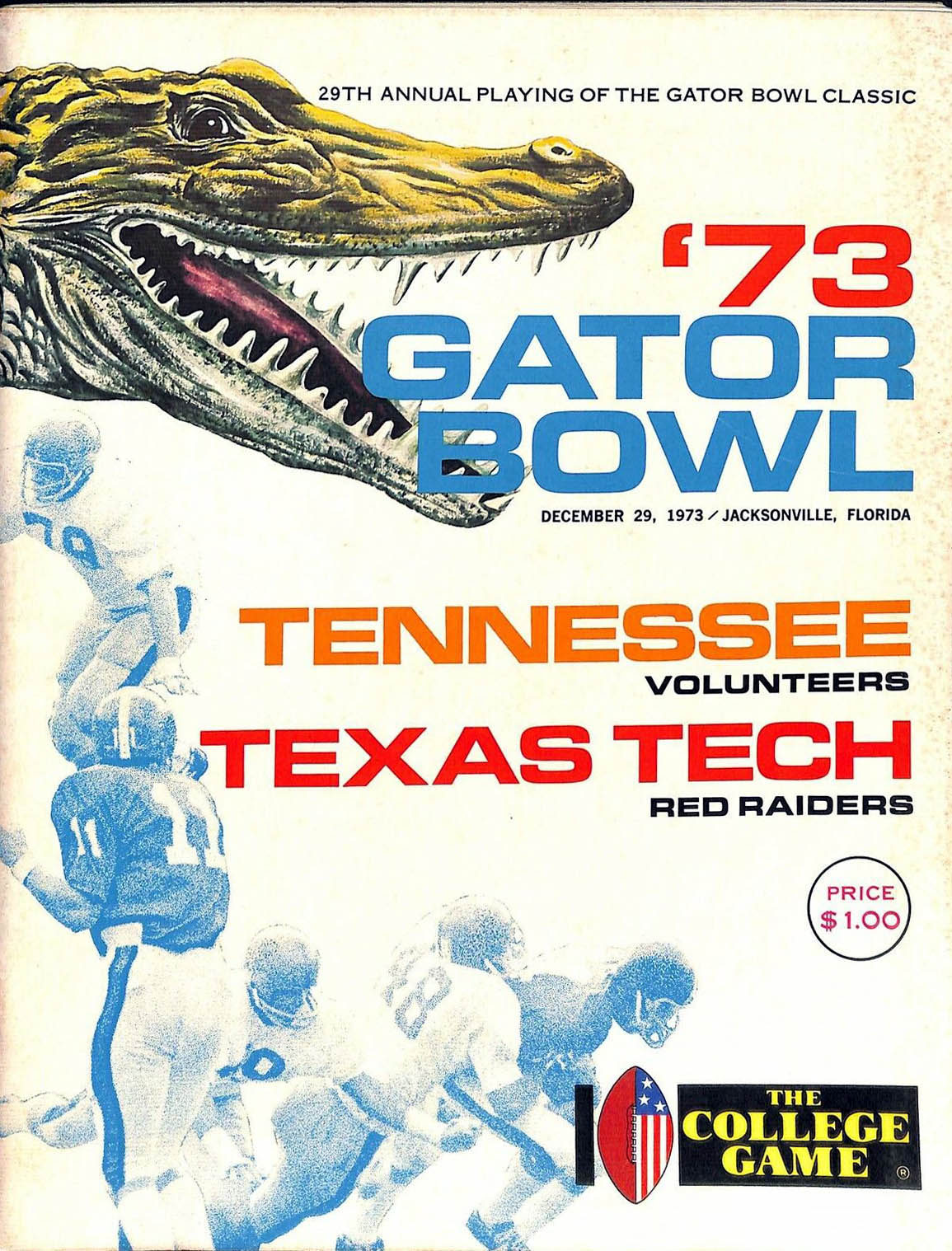
The game program for the 1973 Gator Bowl

The history of the bowl game began with the 1902 Tournament East-West football game, sponsored by the Tournament of Roses Association between Michigan and Stanford, a game which Michigan won 49–0. The Tournament of Roses eventually sponsored an annual contest starting with the 1916 Tournament East-West Football Game. With the 1923 Rose Bowl it began to be played at the newly completed Rose Bowl stadium, and thus the contest itself became known as the Rose Bowl Game. The word "bowl" to describe the games originates from the Yale Bowl stadium, which was the basis of the design of the Rose Bowl Stadium. Other cities saw the promotional value for tourism that the Tournament of Roses parade and Rose Bowl carried and began to develop their own regional festivals which included college football games. The label "bowl" was attached to the festival name, even though the games were not always played in bowl-shaped stadiums.

The historic timing of bowl games, around the new year, is the result of two factors—warm climate and ease of travel. The original bowls began in warm climates such as Southern California, Louisiana, Florida, and Texas as a way to promote the area for tourism and business. Since commercial air travel was either non-existent or very limited, the games were scheduled well after the end of the regular season to allow fans to travel to the game site. While modern travel is more convenient, all but 5 of 41 bowl games (as of 2017) are still located in cities below approximately 36° N.

Currently, college football bowl games are played from mid-December to early January. As the number of bowl games has increased, the number of games a team would need to win to be invited to a bowl game has decreased. With a 12-game schedule, a number of teams with only 5 wins have been invited to a bowl game.

As of 2018, the University of Alabama has played in more bowl games than any other school, with 69 appearances (counting College Football Playoff semifinals and finals). Alabama also holds the record for most bowl victories with 41.

Florida State held the record of consecutive bowl berths at 36 bowl appearances from 1982 to 2017. However, it is not recognized by the NCAA since the NCAA vacated FSU's 2006 Emerald Bowl victory over UCLA due to an academic issue.

The Rose Bowl was the only major college bowl game in 1930. By 1940, there were five major college bowl games: the Rose Bowl, the Sugar Bowl (established in 1935), the Cotton Bowl Classic (1937), the Orange Bowl (1935), and the Sun Bowl (1935). By 1950, the number had increased to eight games. This slate of eight bowl games persisted through 1960, but by 1970 the number had increased again, to 11 games. The number continued to increase, to 15 games in 1980, to 19 games in 1990, 25 games in 2000, 35 games in 2010, and 41 games by 2015 (40 games plus two teams playing a second game to determine the National Champion). Up until around the 1950s, the small number of games were played solely on New Year's Day, with the only major exception being if the holiday occurred on a Sunday. The tradition of not playing bowl games on Sunday initially started from the Rose Parade and Rose Bowl not being held on Sundays for fear of spooking horses tied at churches, but in later years was done to avoid conflict with NFL games. For the 2016–17 bowl season, the 41 games require a little over three weeks, starting December 17 and ending on January 9. While bowl games were originally exclusive to warm cities thought of as winter vacation destinations, indoor stadiums allow games to be played in colder climates.

The attendance of 106,869 for the 1973 Rose Bowl set the Rose Bowl Stadium record, and an NCAA bowl game attendance record. The Rose Bowl stadium still is the largest capacity stadium and the Rose Bowl game has the highest attendance for postseason bowl games.

In the 1990s, many bowl games began to modify or abandon their traditional names in favor of selling naming rights. While some include the traditional name in some form (e.g. the Rose Bowl Game presented by Northwestern Mutual), others have eliminated their traditional name in favor of solely using their corporate sponsor's name (e.g. the former Citrus Bowl became the Capital One Bowl for some time after the financial services company Capital One bought the naming rights; it later reverted to its original name in 2015).

Prior to 1992, most bowls had strict agreements with certain conferences. For example, the Rose Bowl traditionally invited the champions of the Pac-10 and the Big Ten conferences. The Sugar Bowl invited the SEC champion and the Orange Bowl hosted the Big 8 conference champion. These conference tie-ins led to situations where the top-ranked teams in the country could not play each other in a bowl game. The national championship was decided after the bowls, solely by voters for various media polls, who tried to decide which team was best, sometimes based on wins against far inferior teams. As a result, there could be multiple championship titles and no single champion. This led to the term "Mythical National Championship", which is still used to describe high school national champions, since high school sports have state championship tournaments but not national.

=== Attempts to determine a national champion ===
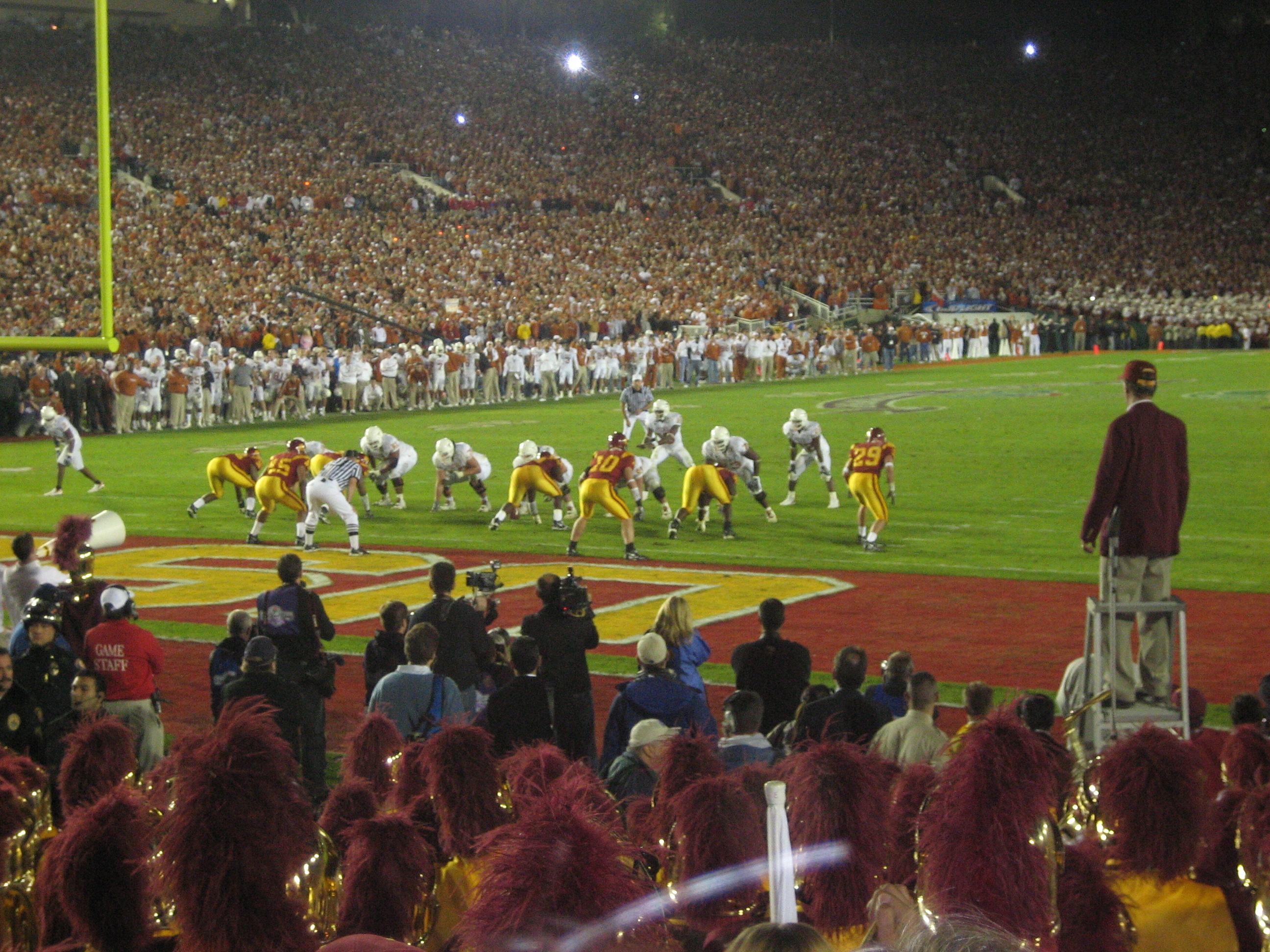
The 2006 Rose Bowl between Texas and USC at the Rose Bowl in Pasadena, California

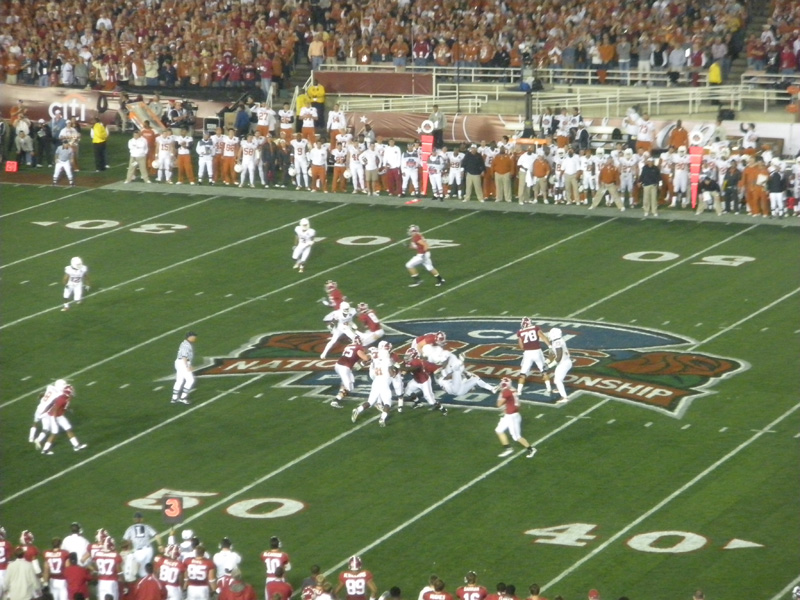
The 2010 BCS National Championship Game between Alabama and Texas

Because of the vested economic interests entrenched in the various bowl games, the longer regular season compared to lower divisions of college football, and a desire not to have college players play several rounds of playoff games during final exams and winter recess, the Division I Bowl Subdivision long avoided instituting a playoff tournament to determine an annual national champion. Instead, the National Champion in the Football Bowl Subdivision has traditionally been determined by a vote of sports writers and other non-players.

In 1995, the Bowl Alliance, formed by the major bowls and conferences, put in place a system where the two highest ranked teams would play each other, even if they were each affiliated with a different bowl. However, the Pac-10 and Big Ten and the Rose Bowl did not participate. Number 1 vs Number 2 bowl match-ups became far more likely, but were not guaranteed. After the 1997 season, undefeated Michigan was ranked first in both major polls, but as the Big Ten champion, they played eighth-ranked Pac-10 champion Washington State in the Rose Bowl. The top Bowl Alliance team, #2 and unbeaten Nebraska, faced one-loss, third-ranked Tennessee in the Orange Bowl. Michigan won by five on New Year's Day and the next night, Nebraska beat Tennessee (playing with an injury-hobbled Peyton Manning) by 25. The AP kept Michigan as the champion, but the Coaches' Poll jumped Nebraska, playing its final game for retiring coach Tom Osborne, in part because of their more lopsided victory against a more highly ranked opponent.

The following season, the Rose Bowl, Pac-10, and Big Ten joined the other bowls and major conferences to form the Bowl Championship Series. The BCS attempted to match the two highest ranked teams in the country based upon calculations from various sources, including statistics and coaches' polls, with one of the four bowl games in the consortium, the Rose Bowl, Fiesta Bowl, Sugar Bowl, and Orange Bowl, rotating the role of "national championship." In 2006, a dedicated BCS Championship Game rotated among the BCS venues. The BCS Championship Game, while separate from the four main bowls, was still rotated among their sites. The Coaches Poll was contractually obligated to recognize the winner of the game as its national champion. However, other polls such as the AP Poll may deviate and pick a different team, particularly in years when multiple teams were equally worthy of reaching the game. In 2003, for instance, one-loss LSU won the BCS National Championship over Oklahoma, but the AP crowned one-loss USC champion after its Rose Bowl win.

For the 2014–15 season, the BCS was replaced by a new consortium, the College Football Playoff (CFP). The new system used a four-team single-elimination tournament, with its participants selected and seeded by a committee; the semi-final games were rotated between pairs of the six member bowls yearly, branded as the "New Year's Six": the Rose Bowl and Sugar Bowl, then Orange Bowl and Cotton Bowl Classic, and then the Fiesta Bowl and Peach Bowl. The winners from the two semi-final bowls advanced to the College Football Playoff National Championship, played at a neutral site determined using bids. Members of the New Year's Six that were not hosting semi-final games reverted to their traditional tie-ins. The CFP then expanded to a 12-team format for the 2024–25 season, with members of the New Year's Six now either hosting the quarter-finals and semi-finals on a rotating basis. Like its predecessors, and in contrast to the officially sanctioned NCAA tournaments at lower levels, the College Football Playoff is not officially recognized as an NCAA championship.

== Professional bowl games ==
The National Football League also used the name "bowl" for some of its playoff games. While the NFL Championship was not named a Bowl initially, the league instituted the Pro Bowl as the name of its all-star game in 1951, and introduced the Bert Bell Benefit Bowl (also known as the Playoff Bowl) as a matchup of the two second-place teams in each division from 1960 to 1969.

When the professional football AFL–NFL merger occurred in 1970, the AFL–NFL World Championship Game became the NFL's championship and is now known as the Super Bowl, as it has been named since 1968 (the name was coined by Lamar Hunt after watching his daughter play with a super ball). There has also been the American Bowl, a preseason match held overseas, and various one-time games informally nicknamed bowls, such as the Bounty Bowl, Ice Bowl, Snow Bowl, Freezer Bowl, Fog Bowl, Mud Bowl, Tuna Bowl, Manning Bowl, Harbaugh Bowl, Kelce Bowl and the proposed (but ultimately canceled) China Bowl.

As a result, other professional football leagues used or use the name Bowl for their championships, such as the World Football League (World Bowl), NFL Europe (World Bowl), Arena Football League (ArenaBowl), Indoor Football League (United Bowl), Great Lakes Indoor Football League (Great Lakes Bowl) and American Indoor Football Association (AIFA Championship Bowl). The Canadian Football League nicknames one of their rivalries as the Banjo Bowl and another QEW Bowl (also known as the Battle of Ontario); like most Canadian sports leagues, however, the CFL's championship is instead known as a cup (in the CFL's case, the Grey Cup).

== Bowl games today ==
=== Postseason bowls ===
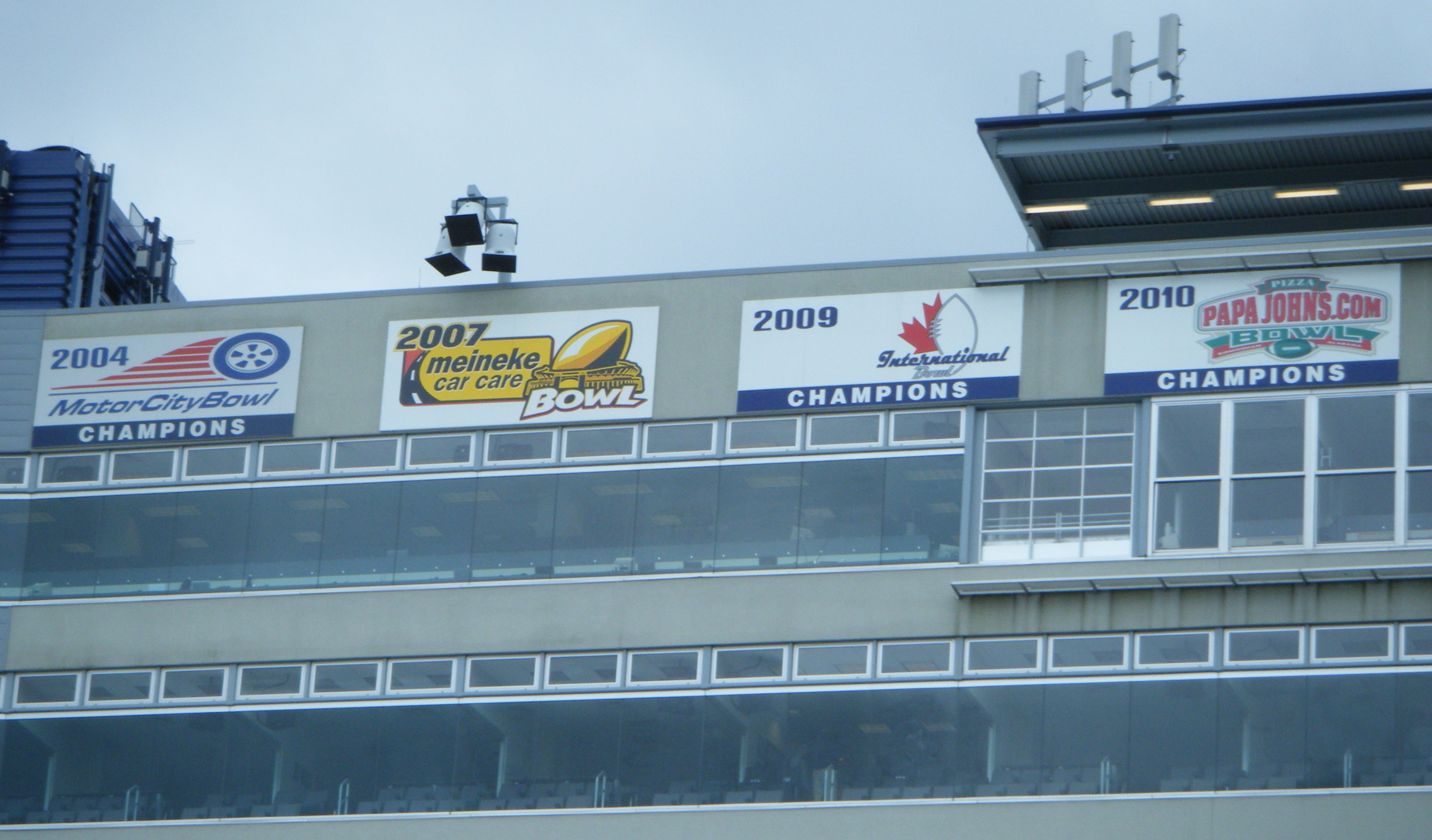
Banners celebrating bowl appearances and wins by UConn Huskies football at Rentschler Field

At the NCAA top level of football, the Division I Football Bowl Subdivision (FBS, previously known as Division I-A from 1978 through 2005), teams must earn the right to be bowl eligible, generally by winning at least six games and by not having a losing record at the end of their regular season schedule. They can then be invited to a bowl game based on their finishing placement in their conference, and tie-ins that their conference has to various bowl games. Alternately, a bowl-eligible team may receive an at-large invitation to a bowl game, independent of conference tie-ins.

Bowls are popular among coaching staffs because the NCAA allows college teams going to bowl games extra weeks of practice they would otherwise not have, and bowl games pay the teams for their participation. Teams belonging to a conference split the money with their conference mates. For the 2010 season, 70 of the 120 Division I FBS teams played in a bowl game.

An association of the bowl games themselves, independent of the NCAA, has existed since at least 1989. Originally known as the Football Bowl Association, the organization announced a rebranding as "Bowl Season" in October 2020. It aims to work "with all existing bowls to promote the benefits of the entire bowl system". Since the 2025-26 bowl season, the organization has been sponsored by Coca-Cola and is officially known as Coca-Cola Bowl Season.

NCAA bowl season generally lasts from mid-December to early January with the first week of bowl games usually featuring teams from the Group of Five conferences (American Athletic Conference, Conference-USA, Mid-American Conference, Mountain West Conference, Sun Belt Conference and FBS Independents with the exception of Notre Dame) with bowl games featuring mainly teams from the Power Four conferences (ACC, Big Ten, Big 12, SEC and FBS Independent Notre Dame) coming in the second week.

=== Non-FBS bowl games ===
At lower levels, teams play in playoff tournaments with a national championship game at a neutral site, making invitational bowl games less popular than in the Football Bowl Subdivision (FBS).

The Division I Football Championship Subdivision (FCS) features only one bowl game, the Celebration Bowl, formerly the Heritage Bowl. It invites the top teams from historically black colleges and universities, one from the SWAC and one from the MEAC. The SWAC has historically had a longer regular season that extends past Thanksgiving weekend, preventing its teams from participating in the FCS tournament and more closely mirroring the FBS.

At the Division II level there are currently four postseason bowls for teams that did not qualify for the DII playoffs: the Live United Texarkana Bowl, Heritage Bowl, America's Crossroads Bowl, and Florida Beach Bowl. All four of the Division II bowls are played on the first weekend of December.

At the NCAA Division III level, all bowls that are currently played are recent developments (starting in 2008 or later). For the 2017 season, 10 bowls were scheduled to be played by teams that did not qualify for the DIII playoffs: a six-bowl series organized for ECAC teams, a two-bowl series organized between the Centennial Conference and MAC, the New York State Bowl (between Liberty League and Empire 8), and the New England Bowl (between the ECFC, MSCAC, CCC and NEWMAC).

Prior to 2008, the ECAC also held the ECAC Bowl (1989–2003) for Division I-AA and the North Atlantic Bowl (2007), the last of which is now integrated into the conference's six-bowl series. Additionally, the Division III championship game has historically been known as the Amos Alonzo Stagg Bowl.

Outside the NCAA, the Victory Bowl is sponsored by the NCCAA, a group that does not restrict its membership to either NCAA or NAIA. The NAIA does not have any invitational postseason bowl games. Starting with the now defunct Wheat Bowl, the NAIA found it easier to schedule bowl games early in the season rather than late—this allowed the schedule to accommodate large college bowl games and high school sports; one such extant example is the College Fanz First Down Classic, a pre-season bowl game for NAIA teams.

In Canadian football, the Mitchell Bowl and Uteck Bowl are held as the semi-final games for Canada's university football national championship. The bowl winners go on to play each other for the Vanier Cup. The Mitchell Bowl is always hosted by either the Canada West or Ontario conference champion, while the Uteck Bowl is always hosted by either the Atlantic Canada or Quebec conference champion.

=== All-star bowl games ===
Following team-competitive bowl games, a series of all-star bowl games round out the postseason schedule. These games seek to showcase the best departing college players. Such college all-star games include the East–West Shrine Bowl, the Senior Bowl, and the Hula Bowl. Other all-star games, now defunct, include the North–South Shrine Game, and NFLPA Collegiate Bowl.

=== Special games and rivalries ===
There have also been pre-season and regular-season games carrying the "bowl" moniker, including the Mirage Bowl, the Glasnost Bowl and the Canadian Football League's Banjo Bowl.

Examples of bowl games that are not part of the postseason include the Iron Bowl and the Egg Bowl.

Recently, the term "bowl" has been added to other games that have some special note or sub-plot to the actual game, in college or the National Football League. An example of this is the Bowden Bowl given to games where Florida State and Clemson were coached by the father-son duo of Bobby Bowden and Tommy Bowden, respectively.

Games between two very poor teams and/or of a very poor standard of play have been jokingly referred to as the "Toilet Bowl".

== Outside North America ==
=== Brazil ===
The championship game of the Superliga Nacional de Futebol Americano is known as the Brasil Bowl.

=== European Football League ===
In the European Football League (EFL), a European Cup style tournament for European American Football teams affiliated with IFAF Europe, the final game of the EFL was called the Eurobowl, and has been held annually from 1986 to 2019.

=== Denmark ===
In Denmark, the national championship game is called Mermaid Bowl, named after the Hans Christian Andersen fairy tale.

=== Finland ===
In Finland, the national championship game is called Vaahteramalja ("Maple Bowl") and was first held in 1980.

=== Germany ===
In Germany, the national championship game in American football is called the German Bowl and was first held in 1979. Apart from the German Bowl, a Junior Bowl has also been contested in Germany since 1982 and a Ladies Bowl was introduced in 1990. Other, related, national championship games in Germany include the German Flag Bowl (est. 2000), German Junior Flag Bowl (1999) and a German Indoor Flag Bowl (2000).

=== Great Britain ===
The annual championship game of the British American Football Association National Leagues is known as the Britbowl.

=== Ireland ===
The championship game of the American Football Ireland Premier Division is called the Shamrock Bowl. It is generally held around July or August each year and has been played every year since 1986 except for 2000 & 2020.

=== Israel ===
The winner of the Israeli Football League is determined every year in the Israel Bowl. The first to lift the Becker Trophy was the Jerusalem Lions in 2008.

=== Japan ===
The championship game between the East Japan and West Japan champions in college football, is known as the Koshien Bowl. The top middle school teams also compete in the Koshien Bowl. While the pro football championship is known as the Japan X Bowl. The winners of the Koshien and Japan X bowls play each other for the Japan National Championship in the Rice Bowl. The annual high school football championship game is the Christmas Bowl.

=== Netherlands ===
The championship game of the Dutch AFBN First Division is called the Tulip Bowl. The first edition was held in 1986.

=== Switzerland ===
The championship game of the Swiss Nationalliga A is called the Swiss Bowl. It was first held in 1986.

== See also ==
- List of college bowl games
- List of announcers of major college bowl games
- Bids to college bowl games
- Bowl Coalition
- Bowl Alliance
- Bowl Championship Series
- List of NCAA football bowl records
- AP Poll – Bowl game results were not included in the AP championship until the 1968 season (1974 season for the UPI championship)
