= Hetappi Manga Kenkyūjo =

Japanese manga series

- Volume cover

鳥山明のヘタッピマンガ研究所 (Toriyama Akira no Hetappi Manga Kenkyūjo)
- Genre: Educational
- Manga
- Written by: Akira Toriyama; Akira Sakuma
- Published by: Shueisha
- Imprint: Jump Comics
- Magazine: Fresh Jump
- Original run: October 1982 – March 1984
- Volumes: 1
- Manga

Hetappi Manga Kenkyūjo R
- Written by: Yusuke Murata
- Published by: Shueisha
- Imprint: Jump Comics
- Magazine: Weekly Shōnen Jump
- Original run: April 28, 2008 – May 17, 2010
- Volumes: 1
- icon

Akira Toriyama's Hetappi Manga Kenkyūjo (鳥山明のヘタッピマンガ研究所; lit. 'Akira Toriyama's Clumsy Manga Laboratories') is a Japanese manga series by Akira Toriyama and Akira Sakuma. It is a collection of lessons on how to create manga published in Shueisha's magazine Fresh Jump between October 1982 to March 1984, and collected into a single tankōbon released in May 1985. A remake by Yusuke Murata, titled Hetappi Manga Kenkyūjo R, was serialized in Shueisha's Weekly Shōnen Jump from April 2008 to May 2010, with its chapters collected in a single volume released in June 2011.

== Overview ==
Hetappi Manga Kenkyūjo is a source of information and advice for any artist who wants to make manga or comics. Everything is clearly explained, associated with Toriyama's humor. Akira Toriyama, as his manga counterpart, Tori-bot, teaches his young assistant Hetappi as well as the readers his techniques to create manga. Hetappi Manga Kenkyūjo explains how to draw, ink, apply frames, create animation effects and onomatopoeia, and develop characters and character sets. It also explains how to proceed to make the story brief and clear, among other things.

The points listed in Hetappi Manga Kenkyūjo to create manga are: draw regularly (daily, if possible); always start a story with the setting; use large bubbles with little text, readable thumbnails of different sizes, and an ordered presentation that facilitates reading; create expressive characters with different looks, personalities, and a sense of humor. Their position and orientation must remain logical (look toward each other when speaking, fighting, or other actions). Surprise the reader with suspense, unexpected occurrences or actions, and jokes that are open to all. Always prioritize reading comfort (step into the reader's shoes).

== Headings ==
=== Hetappi Manga Institute ===
The first and main part, Hetappi Manga Institute (ヘタッピマンガ研究所), features 12 lessons originally published in Fresh Jump. It explains all the technical aspect, from the narrative aspect to the creation of characters through the technical layout. The professor Tori-bot teaches his pupil Hetappi how to create an identifiable character, how to age a character, the use of perspective, the handling of the pen, sketching, inking Kent paper, editing, layout, and storytelling. In bonus, it gives tips on how to make boards before presenting them to a publisher.

=== Bird Mountain Manga School ===
In the second part, Bird Mountain Manga School (トリヤママンガスクール), the manga artist and co-author Akira Sakuma tells the readers how Toriyama makes his manga. It is made of illustrations by Akira Sakuma (さくまあきら), and real life pictures by Masanori Nishimura (西村まさのり). Akira Toriyama is shown at work, and Akira Sakuma, depicted as a little bunny, makes an analysis of Akira Toriyama's style and tells the readers how the author makes his boards. This section provides detailed descriptions of tools and other elements that have not yet been introduced. It covers topics such as the materials to use, how to draw faces, creating characters and their personalities, painting and inking, applying frames, using onomatopoeia and various effects (e.g., speed, close-ups), the layout of thumbnails, managing speech bubbles, tips for character actions and emotional expression, secrets of gag manga, and ensuring the action is appropriate for the layout.

=== Hetappi Manga Report ===
The pedagogical part, Hetappi Manga Report (ヘタッピマンガレポート), is corrections of amateur boards. Akira Toriyama makes an analysis of works aspiring manga artists of all ages sent following the publication of chapters of Hetappi Manga Kenkyūjo in Fresh Jump. He corrects, advises and explains to the young writers how to improve their manga. Toriyama shows the good points, as well as the pitfalls to avoid. The author highlights the fact that a manga creator must necessarily always think to the reader's welfare in the layout, as well as the screenwriting's presentation, to not lose them.

=== Bonus Part ===
To conclude the volume, in the fourth part Bonus Part (おまけ編, Omake Hen), Toriyama tells the readers how to draw five Dr. Slump characters: Arale Norimaki, Gatchan, Senbei Norimaki, Kinoko Sarada, and Suppaman. This part is in fact a way to bring some additional tips for drawing character's faces.

== Publication ==
Created by Akira Toriyama and Akira Sakuma, Hetappi Manga Kenkyūjo was published in Shueisha's shōnen manga magazine Fresh Jump from the October 1982 to the March 1984 issues. Shueisha collected its chapters in a single tankōbon volume, released on May 10, 1985.

A remake by Yusuke Murata, titled ヘタッピマンガ研究所R (Hetappi Manga Kenkyūjo R), was serialized in Weekly Shōnen Jump, on a monthly basis, from April 28, 2008, to May 17, 2010. It included interviews with manga artists Yoshihiro Togashi, Mizuki Kawashita, Yusei Matsui, and Mitsutoshi Shimabukuro. Shueisha published a collected volume on June 3, 2011.
