= Atsushi Tamura =

Japanese comedian (born 1973)

- 田村 淳
- Born: December 4, 1973 (age 52); Hikoshima, Shimonoseki, Yamaguchi, Japan
- Employer(s): Yoshimoto Kogyo; London Boots
- Spouse: Kaya Nishimura (m. 2016)

Comedy career
- Years active: 1993–
- Medium: Television
- Genres: Manzai, owarai

Atsushi Tamura (田村 淳, Tamura Atsushi; born December 4, 1973) is a famous Japanese comedian from the Hikoshima area of Shimonoseki in Yamaguchi Prefecture, Japan.

He and his partner, Ryo Tamura (田村 亮), form the Japanese comedic duo (お笑いコンビ, owarai kombi) known as "London Boots Ichi-go Ni-go" (ロンドンブーツ1号2号, Rondon Būtsu Ichi-gō Ni-gō). Though the two share the same surname, there is no family relation. The pair started their career by performing comedy on the streets of Tokyo.

== Early life ==
Before he was famous, Atsushi attended an Industrial high school in his hometown of Shimonoseki. He was suspended twice during that time, once for smoking and once for cheating on a test. Atsushi was also a member of a band before becoming interested in comedy. For his first comic act, Atsushi teamed up with a classmate from school. They called themselves Umaseki Fugutarō and Fugunosuke, a name they derived from Shimonoseki, and fugu or pufferfish, a dish famous in the region. Atsushi eventually teamed up with Ryo Tamura after relocating to Tokyo. They chose to go by the name of "London Boots" initially because it was the name of a fictional comedy team. While "London Boots" does not have any particular meaning in English, in Japanese it refers to the knee length platform shoes worn by some Japanese girls.

== London Boots ==
The London Boots act is typical of Japanese comedy duos in the sense that one person in the duo criticizes and abuses his partner who in turn plays the part of a stooge. While Atsushi was once on the receiving end of the duo's jokes, he has since taken the dominant role and does not hesitate to subject Ryo to severe acts of embarrassment.

As London Boots, Atsushi and Ryo also serve as the hosts of many shows and special programs on Japanese television. These programs often derive humor from tricking and humiliating other people, often in very cruel and calculated ways. An example of this could be seen on a former segment known as "Stinger". This segment begins with a man who comes forth with doubts over his girlfriend's faithfulness. In an attempt to settle these doubts, a hired actor known as the stinger is brought to the program. The stinger's objective was always the same. He must introduce himself to the unsuspecting girlfriend in public and quickly try to seduce her in to accompanying him to "his home". Secret cameras and microphones follow the progress of the stinger to see if he is successful. If this is the case, the woman will step in to a room and unexpectedly find herself standing in front of her boyfriend, London Boots and a camera crew. Atsushi will use this and other similar opportunities to instigate shame and callously assign blame. Not even Japanese television personalities and other celebrities are exempt from Atsushi's trickery. Another example of Atsushi's style of humor is when he filmed and exposed his partner Ryo going to a Japanese style brothel.

In 2019, Atsushi's partner, Ryo, was permanently suspended by Yoshimoto for underground business deals with the Yakuza. Atsushi and most others within Yoshimoto thought the ban was unfair, which prompted him to create another talent agency, London Boots, which Ryo joined on January 10, 2020, to resume activities in the entertainment industry. Atsushi himself is now a part of both Yoshimoto and London Boots as the latter is created as an exclusive agency that is not separate from the main Yoshimoto company.

== Television ==
Recently, Atsushi has gained a role as an actor in a large NHK historical drama. Atsushi, who loves Japanese castles and the Japanese Middle Ages (characterized by civil wars), also collects Japanese swords. He once wanted to become a voice actor, but audition judges often pointed out that he has a hard time changing his voice. However, he finally landed a major role as voice actor for Yoichi Hiruma (Eyeshield 21), who, like Atsushi, often tricks people, and has as a "servant" like Ryo. He is currently the host of his own show "London Hearts", along with his partner Ryo. He is also the Japanese voice of Butthead from Beavis and Butthead and the voice of Bart Simpson in The Simpsons Movie only, Junko Hori being the regular Japanese voice of Bart. He also provides the voice of Paradox in Yu-Gi-Oh! 3D: Bonds Beyond Time.

In 2018, he co-hosted the Netflix dating show Rea(L)ove alongside Mari Yaguchi.

== Singing career ==
On May 31, 2006, Atsushi privately became the vocalist of Jealkb, making his indie debut with the song "metronone", which made it to the top of the indie charts. He performed live with his band in April 2007 and made their major debut with the song Chikai, released on October 31, 2007. He is the leader and singer of the band and the band as so far released 9 singles and 2 albums.

== Filmography ==
=== Appearance of the current work ===
TV show

- Deep Shibuya A (NHK-BS2 → General NHK, 2009 April 10 -)
- Shiritagari! (Fuji TV, 2010 April 2 -) regular Friday
- FACTORY-A (TV Asahi channel )
- Super Friday prime (NTV, 2010 October 1 -)
- Teens Digista (E Tele, 2011 March 30 -)
- Naruhodo! High School (NTV, 2011 April 21 -)
- BRAIN WORD QUIZ hikidas! (TBS, 2012 January 17 -)
- Gachi Gase (NTV, 2012 April -)

Radio program

- NewsCLUB Atsushi Tamura of London Boots No. 1 No. 2 (Nippon Cultural Broadcasting, November 13, 2008 -)

Tamako Market (2013)

=== Appearance of past work ===
TV show

- London Boots Atsushi no Horesase Chef ( Asahi Broadcasting Corporation )
- Endo Atsushi (TV Tokyo June 25, 2009 -2010 April 3 series, 2009)
- Ethica no Kagami (Fuji TV )
- Yumegaoka Residence (SKY PerfecTV!)
- Shingata Gakumon Hamaru! Tsubogaku (NTV, 2010 October 13 - 2011 March 30)
- Oshiro Tours (Fuji TV)

TV drama

- NHK Taiga Drama "Komyo ga Tsuji" (2006, " Comprehensive NHK ) - Kazuuji Nakamura

Anime

- Eyeshield 21 (TV Tokyo) - Yoichi Hiruma
- Soreike! Anpanman (Japan TV) - Mozukun

Game

- Beavis and Butt-Head in Virtual Stupidity - Butt-head

Radio

- All Night Nippon Atsushi Tamura Iine! (NBS)
- All Night Nippon Atsushi Tamura (NBS)
- London Boots No. 2 No. 1 Atsushi Tamura Senkyo Club (Nippon Cultural Broadcasting, July 11, 2010)

Film

- GANRYUJIMA (2003) - Sukezo
- One Piece Movie: The Desert Princess and the Pirates: Adventures in Alabasta (2007)
- The Simpsons MOVIE - Bart
- 20th Century Boys 3: Redemption (2009) - Corporate Earth Defense Force
- Yu-Gi-Oh!: Bonds Beyond Time (2010) - Paradox
- Goodbye, Don Glees! (2022) - Tarō Kamogawa

CM

- Nintendo DS Eyeshield 21 MAX Devil Power!
- Otsuka Chemical Holdings Oronamin (2010)
