= Eyeshield =

American football equipment

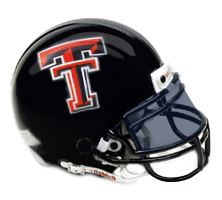
Rendering of a college football helmet with an eyeshield. The NCAA banned the use of tinted and reflective visors in 2006.

An eyeshield, also referred to as a visor, is a piece of gridiron football equipment that was invented in the 1980s. In the mid 1990s, as an effort to prevent brain and head injuries, headgear became mandatory in the game of football. The eyeshield was created to protect the eyes of football players during games and practices. It is a curved piece of plastic that attaches to the front of a football helmet. Safety equipment such as the facemask, eyeshields, and other face shields have been adopted over time to prevent player injury. The eyeshield leaves the mouth exposed, but covers the eyes and nose. The piece of equipment is made from various materials and by many different brands. Only clear eyeshields are permitted for use in high school football games because eyes need to be seen while checking for a concussion. For college-level players, the eyeshield may be tinted for players with eye problems.

== Production ==
The first football visors were made by Oakley. Eyeshields can be made out of plutonite, which is a synthetic material that contributes to its great durability compared to other eyeshields made out of polycarbonate. The eye wear can also be injection-molded, which gives curvature and allows the lenses to reflect glare and enable the players to have increased visibility in most weather conditions. But most eyeshields are made out of polycarbonate. All visors are made curved in order to cover the entire eye area, shielding it from injury and light. Other well-known brands of eyeshields include Nike, Under Armour. To provide a clear view, most eyeshields are wrapped. Another way of providing a clear view to players is using APVX material, which also makes the lens less likely to crack. A shock dampening attachment reduces damage to the eyewear, making it strong and able to withstand hard impact. Most eyeshields are created universal so they can fit almost all helmets and do not require special tools to install. Most tinted visors come in 20,45, and 60 percent. Polarized tints block different UVA, UVC, and UVB rays and harmful blue lights. Eyeshields come in a variety of shades: amber, blue, metallic silver and golds, black, polarized and even rainbow.

== Rules ==
Only clear eyeshields are permitted in high school football because eyes are needed to be seen while checking for a concussion. For college level players, the eyeshield may be tinted for players with eye problems. The NFL allows dark visors to be worn and reflective mirrors but does not allow colored or iridium visors. Tinted visors were banned from the NFL for 20 years until 2019 when they became legal again.

== Durability ==
The durability of eyeshields were tested when eye specialists at Ohio State University used an air cannon to hurl baseballs at the visors. The impact was designed to mimic a force similar to being kicked in the face, a common occurrence during football play. The tested shields successfully maintained their structural integrity after being hit with baseballs that were propelled at velocities of up to 218 ft per second (150 miles per hour).

== Adjustments ==
In 2019, optometrists and ophthalmologists at the University of Alabama at Birmingham worked together with BlazerAthletics to not only create visors to help vision-challenged football players, but also adjusted the rule book to allow players with eye problems to be able to wear the eyeshields during games. The special visors will assist football players that have medical-related light sensitivity to be able to play the game. Taylon Lewis, 11 at the time, was greatly impacted by this. He was born with albinism and suffers from light sensitivity because he naturally has no melanin in either of his irises to block the sun.
