= Christmas Bowl =

Annual Japanese American high school football championship game

The Christmas Bowl (クリスマスボウル, Kurisumasu Bōru) is the annual Japanese high-school American football championship game. As with most American Football leagues, the league setup is split into two regions — Kantō and Kansai — and the champions of each region play in the Christmas Bowl. It takes place on even years in Kansai, and on odd years in Kantō. Since 2001, the matches in Kantō have taken place in Ajinomoto Stadium.

Surprisingly, the competition has been going on for almost as long as the Super Bowl, being only four contests behind.

The Christmas Bowl in the manga and anime series Eyeshield 21 is based on this competition.

== Number of participating schools by district ==
While the leagues are split into the Kanto and Kansai leagues, the leagues actually encompass the East and West of Japan, respectively. Teams compete in the Kanto and Kansai tournaments.

=== Kanto Tournament ===
- 3 schools from Tokyo
- 2 schools from Kanagawa
- 1 schools from Saitama / Ibaraki / Chiba
- 1 school from Shizuoka
- 1 school from Hokkaido

=== Kansai Tournament ===
- 3 schools from Osaka
- 2 schools from Hyogo
- 1.5 schools from Kyoto
- 1.5 schools from Shiga
- 1 school from the Tokai region
- 1 school from Hiroshima

The Tokai area is composed only of high schools in Aichi. The second place teams from Kyoto and Shiga play in a playoff match, the winner of which can participate in the Kansai tournament.

== See also ==
- Category:High school football games in the United States
