= Riichiro Inagaki =

Japanese manga writer (born 1976)

Riichiro Inagaki 稲垣 理一郎
- Born: June 20, 1976 (age 50) Tokyo, Japan
- Area: Manga writer
- Notable works: Eyeshield 21; Dr. Stone
- Awards: Shogakukan Manga Award (2019)
- Spouse: Orie Kimoto
- Children: 3

Riichiro Inagaki (Japanese: 稲垣 理一郎, Hepburn: Inagaki Riichirō; born June 20, 1976) is a Japanese manga writer from Tokyo. He started his career in 2001 publishing works for Shogakukan's magazine Big Comic Spirits. After three one-shots, he moved to Shueisha's Weekly Shōnen Jump, in which he started the work he is best known for, Eyeshield 21. In collaboration with the artist Yusuke Murata, Eyeshield 21 was serialized between July 2002 and June 2009 in Weekly Shōnen Jump. Between 2010 and 2015, Inagaki collaborated with several artists, including Bonjae, Katsunori Matsui, and Ryoichi Ikegami, and published one-shots in different magazines. He started a new series titled Dr. Stone in Weekly Shōnen Jump in 2017, in collaboration with Boichi. He has 3 children with Orie Kimoto.

== Biography ==
Born on June 20, 1976, in Tokyo, Inagaki started to like manga when he read Fujiko Fujio's Manga Michi in middle school. In 1994, he competed at the third Manga Kōshien, a high school manga contest based in Kōchi Prefecture. As it only demanded a one-panel story, Inagaki just threw some ink on the paper to look like he had messed up the story. He said, "People really liked that for some reason. But Manga Koshien isn't something I'm so fond of remembering". After finishing school, he enrolled in a manga and film production company as animation assistant. He started his career as professional manga writer by publishing works in Shogakukan's Big Comic Spirits. He debuted in October 2001 with Nandodemo Roku Gatsu Jū San Hi, and also wrote for the magazine Square Freeze and Love Love Santa, published in November 2001 and in February 2002 respectively. He later moved to Shueisha's Weekly Shōnen Jump, in which he won the 7th "Story King" award for a storyboard of Eyeshield 21.

When he planned to create Eyeshield 21, the editorial department asked if he wanted to both write and draw the series, but Inagaki felt he was "so rookie". So he asked Yusuke Murata to be the illustrator. In 2002, they published two one-shots called Eyeshield Part 1 (前編, Zenpen) and Part 2 (後編, Kōhen) on March 5 and 12 in Weekly Shōnen Jump. The series began to be regularly published on July 23 of the same year in the same magazine, and spanned 333 chapters, the last one being published on June 15, 2009. Collected in 37 tankōbon volumes by Shueisha, the series became his most known work. It has sold more than 20 million copies in Japan, has been published in seven countries, including in the United States, (Note: An English translation of the manga was published in North America by Viz Media under the Shonen Jump Advanced label between April 5, 2005, and October 4, 2011. The manga has also been licensed in France by Glénat, in Hong Kong by Culturecom, in Indonesia by Elex Media Komputindo, in Italy by Panini Comics, in South Korea by Daewon Media, and in Taiwan by Tong Li Publishing.) and gained an anime adaptation that aired for 145 episodes from April 2005 to March 2008 on TV Tokyo. For the release of Eyeshield 21 anime he created the Kome Studio, a company of copyright management to ensure the right of the original creators of manga. The company name, which translates to "rice", was chosen for three reasons: 1) because "Inagaki" contains a kanji ("稲") that can be translated to rice; 2) because "rice" kanji ("米") is also used to represent the United States; and 3) because of the Rice Bowl, an American football championship in Japan.

In 2006, he was chosen, along with Akira Toriyama and Eiichiro Oda, to be a committee member for the Tezuka Award. In June 2010, he published Kiba&Kiba in Weekly Shōnen Jump along with Bonjae, and his collaboration work with Katsunori Matsui, Shinpai Kato No Face, was published in the 2011 first issue of Weekly Young Jump. He published another collaborative work with Matsui, Alpha Centauri Dōbutsuen; a two-chapter series, it was published on January 10 and February 10, 2014, in the Jump X magazine. Along with Ryoichi Ikegami, he published the one-shot Kobushi Zamurai in Shogakukan's Big Comic Superior on August 12, 2015.

On March 6, 2017, he started to serialize Dr. Stone in Weekly Shōnen Jump with collaboration of illustrator Boichi. In January 2019, Dr. Stone was elected the best shōnen manga of 2018 at the 64th Shogakukan Manga Awards. Shueisha collected its 232 individual chapters in 26 tankōbon volumes, released between July 7, 2017, and July 4, 2022. An additional volume was released on April 4, 2024. The series has been popular; it has over 18 million copies in circulation in Japan, and has been published in nine countries. (Note: An English-language translation of the manga is published by Viz Media since September 2018. It has also been published in Brazil and Mexico by Panini Comics, in France by Glénat, in Hong Kong by Jade Dinasty, in Italy by Star Comics, in Poland by Waneko, in Spain by Editorial Ivrea, and in Taiwan by Tong Li Publishing.) It was also adapted into an anime series—the 24-episode first season aired on Tokyo MX between July and December 2019, and aired a second season between January and March 2021, with a television special scheduled to air in 2022 and a third season in 2023.

On December 11, 2020, he started to serialize Trillion Game in Big Comic Superior, once again in collaboration with Ryoichi Ikegami.

== Works ==
- Nandodemo Roku Gatsu Jū San Hi (何度でも6月13日; lit. "Any Number of Times on the 13th of June") (2001)
- Square Freeze (スクウェアフリーズ, Sukuea Furīzu) (2001)
- Love Love Santa (LOVE LOVE サンタ) (2002)
- Eyeshield 21 (アイシールド21, Aishīrudo Nijūichi) (one-shot with Yusuke Murata; 2002)
- Eyeshield 21 (series with Yusuke Murata; 2002–2009)
- Kiba&Kiba (with Bonjae; 2010)
- Shinpai Kato No Face (心配怪盗 NO FACE) (with Katsunori Matsui; 2011)
- Alpha Centauri Dōbutsuen (αケンタウリ動物園; lit. "Alpha Centauri Zoo") (with Katsunori Matsui; 2014)
- Kobushi Zamurai (こぶしざむらい) (with Ryoichi Ikegami; 2015)
- Dr. Stone (with Boichi; 2017–2022)
- Trillion Game (トリリオンゲーム, Toririon Gēmu) (with Ryoichi Ikegami; 2020–2025)
