= Yusuke Murata =

Japanese manga artist (born 1978)

Yusuke Murata 村田 雄介
- Born: July 4, 1978 (age 48) Kumamoto, Japan
- Areas: Manga artist, animator
- Notable works: Eyeshield 21; One-Punch Man

Yusuke Murata (Japanese: 村田 雄介, Hepburn: Murata Yūsuke; born July 4, 1978) is a Japanese manga artist and animator, best known for illustrating the American football manga Eyeshield 21 in collaboration with writer Riichiro Inagaki, serialized between July 2002 and June 2009 in Weekly Shōnen Jump; and ONE's One-Punch Man, serialized in the Weekly Young Jump online version. Both works have been adapted into anime television series.

== Biography ==
Murata was born in 1978 in Kumamoto, Japan, but moved frequently due to his father's job. Having lived in Sendai until the 5th grade, he often claims Miyagi Prefecture as his hometown. At the age of twelve, he entered a contest to design Mega Man villains and won twice, having final designs adapted from his sketches. The game credits list his name as responsible for Dust Man from Mega Man 4 and Crystal Man from Mega Man 5. Murata debuted as a professional manga artist in 1995 by publishing a one-shot titled Partner in a special edition of Shueisha's Weekly Shōnen Jump. For this work, he received the Hop Step Award. Murata published Samui Hanashi in Weekly Shōnen Jump in June 1998, which won him the Akatsuka Award. In February 2002, he published Kaitō Colt in the same magazine.

When planning was underway to create Eyeshield 21, the editorial department asked Riichiro Inagaki if he wanted to both write and draw the series, but Inagaki felt he was "so rookie". So Inagaki asked Murata to be the illustrator. In 2002, they published two one-shots called Eyeshield Part 1 (前編, Zenpen) and Part 2 (後編, Kōhen) on March 5 and 12 in Weekly Shōnen Jump. The series began regular publication on July 23 of the same year in the same magazine. The series spanned 333 chapters, with the final chapter being published on June 15, 2009; the series was collected in 37 volumes. An anime adaptation, directed by Masayoshi Nishida and co-produced by TV Tokyo, NAS, and Gallop, aired from April 2005 to March 2008.

From 2008 to 2010, Weekly Shōnen Jump published once a month a chapter of Hetappi Manga Kenkyūjo R (lit. "Hetappi Manga Research Lab R"), Murata's remake of Akira Toriyama's Hetappi Manga Kenkyūjo. It is a story about Saitou, a Jump editor based on Murata and Inagaki's own editor on Eyeshield 21, who decides to become a manga artist and threatens Murata to teach him how to draw manga. A collected volume of the series was released by Shueisha on June 3, 2011. In 2012, Murata posted on Twitter a short story in the same universe in which Saitou pesters the Murata for his manuscript and it was well received for its inventive use of folded paper, cutouts and white-out to create a three-dimensional appearance for his comic.

Murata wrote and drew a one-shot titled Madofuki Park for the April 2008 issue (published on March 4) of Jump Square, about a futuristic window washer. He also created the one-shot Blust!, centered on a boy who was experimented on and obtained extraordinary powers from eating curry, which was published in April 2009. Murata created yet another one-shot featured in the Weekly Shōnen Jump on June 21, 2010; titled Minds, it was a story about a self-sacrificing soldier during a war, set in the future. Murata also illustrated the Weekly Shōnen Jump 40th anniversary posters, which display the popular manga characters featured in the magazine. Murata served as the artist for Donten Prism Solar Car, which was written by Yasuo Ōtagaki (author of Moonlight Mile) and was published in Jump Square between September 4, 2010, and June 4, 2011. The story of a young man who works at an ironworks and receives the request to build a solar car, it was later published by Shueisha in two volumes.

In 2012, Murata published two one-shots along with a Japanese web comic author dubbed "One"; the first one, Dotō no Yūshatachi, was released on April 1 in Weekly Young Jump, and the second, Dangan Tenshi Fan Club was released on April 17 in Miracle Jump. Murata started to collaborate with One on the remake of the webcomic One-Punch Man, which started to be serialized in the online version of the Weekly Young Jump on June 14, 2012. Eighteen volumes have been released by Shueisha as of December 4, 2018. An anime adaptation, directed by Shingo Natsume and produced by Madhouse, aired from October 2015 to December 2015.

In November 2013, Murata was hired to be the character designer for the Majin Bone anime adaptation that began in April 2014. For Square Enix's magazine Young Gangan's 10th anniversary issue published on March 20, 2015, Murata did the illustration for One's Gokiburi Buster, a story about a soldier who is specialized on killing cockroaches. On June 30, 2016, Murata started to publish Mangaka Yashoku Benkyuusho (lit. "Manga Artist's Late-Night Snack Laboratory") on Kodansha magazine Morning digital edition. Each chapter features a fictionalized version of Murata preparing dishes, and its 33 chapters have been released into a single volume on December 12, 2016.

On May 10, 2019, Murata's father died – this information was announced by Yusuke Murata and his brother Kensuke Murata. He announced on Twitter that he has a son, born in 2007, and a daughter, born in 2010, and he uses his daughter's character to illustrate Zenko and his son to illustrate Bateman on One-Punch Man (season 2). Zenko somewhat reminds Murata of his daughter because of the fact she plays the piano like her.

== Influences and style ==
Murata is a fan of Kinu Nishimura, the character designer of many Capcom video games and Akira Toriyama's Dragon Ball, with Goku's battles against Piccolo and Frieza being his favorite moments from the latter. Murata has been highly praised for his art and character designs, including comparisons to Toriyama by June Shimonishi of School Library Journal, as "every inch [is] filled with details and no gag left unseen." Deb Aoki of About.com praised how Murata's art gives Eyeshield 21 dynamism, while "he adds a lot of clever, hilarious details." Aoki also said Murata knows "his art is not just there to look pretty – it's there to tell a story." Mania.com's Jarred Pine commended the character's features details and how "strong realistic designs are balanced with some exaggerated ones that add a nice comedic effect." Murata's ability to draw from different perspectives and angles was praised by Aoki, Pine, as well as Zac Bertschy and Carlo Santos of Anime News Network. Saying that "it's difficult to capture the kind of frantic motion every panel exudes in animation," Bertschy asserted the manga may be better than the anime because of Murata's art uniqueness. Santos said his capacity of creating imaginative features is not limited to action, praising the singularity of each of the main characters of Eyeshield 21.

== Works ==
- Mega Man 4 (ロックマン4 新たなる野望!!, Rokkuman 4 Aratanaru Yabou!!) (Dust Man designer, 1991)
- Mega Man 5 (ロックマン5 ブルースの罠!?, Rokkuman 5 Burūsu no Wana!?) (Crystal Man designer, 1992)
- Partner (パートナー, Pātonā) (1995)
- Samui Hanashi (さむいはなし) (1998)
- Kaitō Colt (怪盗COLT) (2002)
- Eyeshield 21 (アイシールド21, Aishīrudo Nijūichi) (one-shot with Riichiro Inagaki; 2002)
- Eyeshield 21 (series with Riichiro Inagaki; 2002–2009)
- Madofuki Park (窓ふきパルク, Madofuki Paruku) (2008)
- Hetappi Manga Kenkyūjo R (ヘタッピマンガ研究所R) (2008–2010)
- Blust! (2009)
- Minds (マインズ, Mainzu) (2010)
- Donten Prism Solar Car (曇天・プリズム・ソーラーカー, Donten Purizumu Sōrā Kā) (with Yasuo Ōtagaki; 2010–2011)
- Dotō no Yūshatachi (怒涛の勇者達) (with One; 2012)
- Dangan Tenshi Fan Club (弾丸天使ファンクラブ, Dangan Tenshi Fan Kurabu) (with One; 2012)
- One-Punch Man (ワンパンマン, Wanpanman) (with One; 2012–ongoing)
- Monster of Earth (地球の怪獣, Chikyū no Kaijū) (one-shot with One and Kinu Nishimura; 2013)
- Gokiburi Buster (ゴキブリバスター, Gokiburi Basutā) (2015)
- Amazing Spider-Man: Renew Your Vows #4 (manga variant cover; 2015)
- Spider-Island #3 (manga variant cover; 2015)
- Spider-Verse (Japanese edition cover; 2016)
- Science vs. Magic (one-shot with Inukorosuke; 2019)
