= There Was a Cute Girl in the Hero's Party, So I Tried Confessing to Her =

Japanese light novel series

- First light novel volume cover, featuring Cecilia

勇者パーティーにかわいい子がいたので、告白してみた。 (Yūsha Pātī ni Kawaii Ko ga Ita no de, Kokuhaku Shite Mita)
- Genre: Isekai; Romantic comedy
- Novel series
- Written by: Suisei
- Published by: Shōsetsuka ni Narō
- Original run: July 17, 2013 – present
- Light novel
- Written by: Suisei
- Illustrated by: La-na
- Published by: Futabasha
- Imprint: Monster Bunko
- Original run: October 30, 2014 – August 29, 2015
- Volumes: 3
- Manga
- Written by: Suisei
- Illustrated by: Kairi
- Published by: Futabasha
- English publisher: NA: Manga Mirai
- Imprint: Monster Comics
- Magazine: Gaugau Monster
- Original run: January 25, 2021 – present
- Volumes: 14
- Anime television series
- Directed by: Yasutaka Yamamoto (chief); Tomonori Mine
- Produced by: Ryō Aizawa
- Written by: Yukie Sugawara
- Music by: Satoru Kōsaki; Monaca
- Studio: Gekkou
- Licensed by: Crunchyroll: SEA: Medialink
- Original network: Tokyo MX, HBC, RKB, BS11, AT-X
- Original run: January 6, 2026 – present
- Episodes: 13
- icon

There Was a Cute Girl in the Hero's Party, So I Tried Confessing to Her (Japanese: 勇者パーティーにかわいい子がいたので、告白してみた。, Hepburn: Yūsha Pātī ni Kawaii Ko ga Ita no de, Kokuhaku Shite Mita) is a Japanese light novel series written by Suisei and illustrated by La-na. It originally began serialization on the web publishing platform Shōsetsuka ni Narō in July 2013, before Futabasha published three volumes under its Monster Bunko imprint between October 2014 and August 2015. A manga adaptation illustrated by Kairi began serialization on Futabasha's Gaugau Monster service in January 2021 and has been compiled into fourteen volumes as of July 2026. An anime television series adaptation produced by Gekkou aired from January to March 2026. A second season has been announced.

== Plot ==
The series follows Yōki, a man killed in a traffic accident who finds himself reincarnated as a demon in another world. Not wanting to become a Demon Lord, he works as a subordinate at the Demon Lord's castle. One day, a Hero's party invades the castle and attacks. However, he finds the party's priestess, Cecilia, cute and falls in love with her. He confesses his feelings to her, which initially horrifies her, leading to her immediately rejecting him. However, as time goes on, she decides to give him a chance, which paves the way to an unusual relationship between the two.

== Characters ==
Yoki (ヨウキ)
Voiced by: Kōhei Amasaki
Initially an awkward young man who was killed in a car accident, before being reincarnated as a demon who works under the Demon Lord. He is in love with Cecilia and gets flustered when he is around her.
Cecilia (セシリア, Seshiria)
Voiced by: Kana Hanazawa
A priestess who is member of the Hero's party. She is kind and beautiful, but scolds Yōki when his actions get too much.
Horrified by Yōki's sudden confession, she initially rejects him, finding him creepy and invasive. However, she soon decides to give him a chance and ends up forming a genuine bond with him. She is the target of many other men's affection as well, which constantly enrages Yōki, though she always stays loyal to him, even if she's not sure if she actually reciprocates his feelings.
Yūga (ユウガ)
Voiced by: Ryōhei Kimura
The hero of the Hero's party. While he is dating Mikana, he is also pursuing Cecilia, which upsets both Yoki and Mikana.
Mikana (ミカナ)
Voiced by: Yūko Natsuyoshi.
The mage of the Hero's party. She is dating Yuga
Duke (デューク, Dyūku)
Voiced by: Toshiki Masuda
A demon and a member of Yoki's old crew, he is a "headless knight", but to fit in with humans, his head is now permanently attached.
Seek (シーク, Shīku)
Voiced by: Minami Tanaka
A pixie and a member of Yoki's old crew. Pretends to be a small boy among humans.
Happiness (ハピネス, Hapinesu)
Voiced by: Iori Noguchi
A harpy and a member of Yoki's old crew, she has her feathers removed so she can fit in with humans. She takes on the role of a maid at Cecilia's mansion and starts a relationship with Raven.
Raven (レイヴン, Reivun)
Voiced by: Ayumu Murase
The swordsman of the Hero's Party who has a very feminine voice, so seldom speaks. He starts a relationship with Happiness.
Shike (シケ)
Voiced by: Momo Sakurai
Misaki (ミサキ)
Voiced by: Aimi Ozawa

== Media ==
=== Light novel ===
Written by Suisei, the series originally began serialization on the web publishing platform Shōsetsuka ni Narō on July 17, 2013. Futabasha later picked up the series for publication under their Monster Bunko imprint, releasing three volumes between October 30, 2014, and August 29, 2015.

No.	Release date	ISBN
1	October 30, 2014	978-4-575-75012-6
2	March 30, 2015	978-4-575-75032-4
3	August 29, 2015	978-4-575-75055-3

=== Manga ===
A manga adaptation illustrated by Kairi began serialization on Futabasha's Gaugau Monster service on January 25, 2021. The first tankōbon volume was released on June 30, 2021. Fourteen volumes have been released as of July 2026. The manga adaptation is published digitally in English on NTT Docomo's Manga Mirai website.

No.	Release date	ISBN
1	June 30, 2021	978-4-575-41257-4
2	December 28, 2021	978-4-575-41345-8
3	June 30, 2022	978-4-575-41448-6
4	December 28, 2022	978-4-575-41558-2
5	May 30, 2023	978-4-575-41655-8
6	September 29, 2023	978-4-575-41737-1
7	January 30, 2024	978-4-575-41812-5
8	April 30, 2024	978-4-575-41872-9
9	July 30, 2024	978-4-575-41939-9
10	November 29, 2024	978-4-575-42029-6
11	March 28, 2025	978-4-575-42116-3
12	July 30, 2025	978-4-575-42205-4
13	December 26, 2025	978-4-575-42319-8
14	July 15, 2026	978-4-575-42453-9

=== Anime ===
An anime television series adaptation was announced on July 4, 2025. It is produced by Gekkou and directed by Tomonori Mine, with Yasutaka Yamamoto serving as chief director, Yukie Sugawara handling series composition, Mina Ōsawa designing the characters, and Satoru Kōsaki and Monaca composing the music. The series aired from January 6 to March 31, 2026, 2026, on Tokyo MX and other networks. The opening theme song is "Lavish!!", performed by Yoshino, and the ending theme song is "Kimi Kōryaku Game" (キミ攻略ゲーム; 'Capturing You Game'), performed by Hiyori Omiya. The special ending theme song "Yes! Summer Love" was performed by Iori Noguchi, Momo Sakurai and Aimi Ozawa (as Happiness, Shike and Misaki). Crunchyroll is streaming the series. Medialink licensed the series in Southeast Asia for streaming on Ani-One Asia's YouTube channel.

On November 7, 2026, a second season was announced.

==== Episodes ====
No.	Title	Directed by (Note: Production staff information is taken from the ending credits of each episode.)	Written by	Storyboarded by	Original release date
1	"I Tried Confessing"; Transliteration: "Kokuhaku Shite Mita" (Japanese: 告白してみた。)	Tomonori Mine & Masayoshi Nishida	Yukie Sugawara	Tomonori Mine & Masayoshi Nishida	January 6, 2026
A party of heroes led by Yuga assaults the Demon King's castle, but are defeated by the demon captain Yoki. Yoki develops a crush on Cecilia the priestess, so he offers to let Yuga, Raven the swordsman, and Mikana the sorceress reach the Demon King if they leave Cecilia behind. Cecilia is shocked, but Yoki confesses to her and reveals he is a human reincarnated as a powerful demon; the only reason he has not killed the Demon King himself is because he does not want to become the Demon King by doing so. In response, Cecilia urges him to use his power to help others. Yuga kills the Demon King and the party is rewarded by King Dartz of Clariness Kingdom. Yoki breaks off his demon horn to appear human and registers as an adventurer. He is invited to Cecilia's home where she explains that with the Demon King dead, human kingdoms have already begun fighting between themselves, with some even trying to gain Yuga's loyalty. She also knows if Yoki's strength is exposed, he could be targeted too. They are interrupted by Celia, Cecilia's mother, who mentions that Cecilia has received many marriage offers, including from Yuga, causing Yoki to accidentally reveal his own crush. Intrigued, Celia asks him to marry Cecilia, but he refuses as he feels he is not yet worthy of her. Celia is thrilled by his humbleness and respect for Cecilia's feelings, and decides he is ideal husband material, much to Cecilia's chagrin as she does not want to be married.
2	"I Tried Going on a Date"; Transliteration: "Dēto Shite Mita" (Japanese: デートしてみた。)	Masato Uchibori	Yukie Sugawara	Mota Shibue	January 13, 2026
Yoki encounters former subordinates Duke the dullahan, Happiness the harpy and Shiek the pixie. They accept his human lifestyle and disguise themselves as humans to meet Cecilia and Celia. Head maid Sophia mistakes Happiness as a trainee maid, but Happiness decides to accept the job. Celia has Yoki take Cecilia on a date to relax. Despite her public disguise Cecilia is recognised by Yuga and Mikana who are also disguised. Yuga clings to Cecilia, annoying Mikana who was hoping to seduce Yuga. Yoki tries to buy Cecilia a simple necklace, so Yuga jealously buys the most expensive jewellery in the shop and brainlessly knocks off Cecilia's disguise. Crowds instantly gather and they are separated. Yoki spots Raven being swarmed by women and helps him escape, learning Raven hardly speaks as he has a feminine voice. Yoki finds Cecilia and they help a lost boy find his mother. Yuga and Mikana argue over his obsession with Cecilia and Mikana angrily leaves. Cecilia collapses from stress, for which Celia blames Yuga. Yoki blames himself but Cecilia decides he will have to take her out again. Yoki realises Cecilia just asked for another date and causes such a fuss Sophia throws him out. Yoki becomes convinced Sophia is not human. He encounters Raven on his way to confess to a girl he likes. Yoki wishes him luck, then panics when he sees Raven entering Cecilia's house.
3	"I Tried Giving Love Advice"; Transliteration: "Ren'ai Sōdan o Ukete Mita." (Japanese: 恋愛相談を受けてみた.)	Shigeru Yamazaki	Yukie Sugawara	Shigeru Yamazaki	January 20, 2026
Raven leaves after being rejected by Happiness. Yoki is relieved Cecilia wasn't Raven's crush. Duke is certain Happiness hates humans since they tried to enslave her, but Shiek points out this can't be true since Happiness volunteered to work in Cecilia's house. Yoki visits his new friend Vice-guildmaster Kramen in hospital, his wife having beaten him up for missing their anniversary. Yoki is further surprised his wife is Sophia. He asks Sophia how to cheer up Cecilia, and she suggests anything would work if he is sincere. He visits Raven who admits he fell in love with Happiness after she was actually envious of his feminine voice. Yoki explains Happiness is naturally nervous, so he shouldn't give up yet. Yoki buys the necklace he previously chose for Cecilia while Raven buys a feather brooch for Happiness. Mikana spots them and admits she needs love advice. She reveals while raiding the Demon Lord's castle there was an insanely strong demon that only let them pass in exchange for Cecilia. It was Mikana that convinced Yuga and Raven to agree, and Yuga has still not forgiven her for it. Unable to reveal he was the demon, Yoki suggests she talk to Cecilia. Raven decides to see Happiness again, gives her the brooch and asks to be friends, which she accepts.
4	"I Gave the Hero a Lecture"; Transliteration: "Yūsha ni Sekkyō Shite Mita." (Japanese: 勇者に説教してみた.)	Ken Kiyota	Yukie Sugawara	Masayoshi Nishida	January 27, 2026
A soothsayer predicts Yoki will have terrible luck. Yoki receives squashed buns from a baker, is delayed by a young boy bumping into him and then is targeted by a pickpocket. He chases the thief and retrieves his money but Yuga mistakes Yoki for a thief. Duke eventually proves his innocence and Yuga apologises. He asks Yoki how to be friends with Cecilia, as both she and Mikana are mad at him. He claims it was Mikana's fault they left Cecilia with a dangerous demon. Yoki points out it was Mikana's idea but it was Yuga who made the final decision as leader. Yuga realises he has treated Mikana terribly, so he rushes to apologise. Unfortunately, Mikana was in her underwear, so she beats him up. The soothsayer notes Yoki's luck has changed for doing a good deed. The baker's sister gives Yoki fresh buns and the boy turns out to be a noble whose butler rewards Yoki. He finally makes it to Cecilia's house where Yuga, Mikana and Raven all apologise for leaving her with the demon, but she forgives them. Yoki finally gives her the necklace which she happily accepts. Elsewhere, bandits attack a village but are themselves killed by a swordsman who declares the fight was boring.
5	"I Tried Being a Demon Again"; Transliteration: "Mazoku ni Modotte Mita." (Japanese: 魔族に戻ってみた.)	Kin	Ukyō Kodachi	Shinuki Takezawa	February 3, 2026
Cecilia takes Yoki and Shiek to the attacked village to heal the villagers. Noticing Cecilia is exhausted Yoki uses magic to put her to sleep until morning. She forgives him after he explains he healed everyone while she slept. The Elder asks them to look at Teal, a young girl who has been sickly since birth. Yoki learns Teal worships a Guardian Deity statue that is actually just a gargoyle. The gargoyle reveals years ago he protected a temple but was stolen by bandits. When the same bandits attacked the village, he punished them and accidentally became worshipped as the village's Guardian Deity. Yoki and Cecilia decide to leave him alone. The swordsman reappears, injures the gargoyle and defeats Shiek. Cecilia identifies him as Miller, a hero from Gallis Empire. Yoki discovers Miller is a madman who desires a war between Gallis and Clariness so he can keep on killing. Yoki destroys his magic sword so Miller hurls a spear at the gargoyle but Teal protects him and is hit instead. Yoki loses control and reverts to his demon form to kill Miller. However, as Cecilia would think less of him, he throws him in a lake instead. Teal is taken as another maid in Cecilia's house while Yoki changes the gargoyle's appearance, though Sophia is unhappy about having such an ugly statue in the house.
6	"I Tried Flying"; Transliteration: "Sora o Tonde Mita." (Japanese: 空を飛んでみた.)	Maki Kamitani	Ukyō Kodachi	Mitsuko Ōya	February 10, 2026
Yoki and Cecilia are summoned by King Dartz over the Miller incident. Cecilia refuses any reward while Yoki publicly admits all he wants is Cecilia's love. Celia punishes Yoki by not letting him see Cecilia for one month, though when this upsets Cecilia she reduces it to two weeks. The gargoyle, Gar, reveals his injuries from Miller have worsened and he expects to die. He asks Yoki to look after Teal, whose illness has also worsened. Duke reveals damaged gargoyles can be healed with magicite ore and Shiek asks Yoki to fetch Twilight Grass to ease Teal's symptoms. Celia ends Yoki's punishment early so Cecilia can help him. Kramen helps by taking them and Sophia on a quest to kill a Rock-eater in a magicite mine where Twilight Grass grows, though the trip will take four days. After a difficult battle they defeat the Rock-eater and retrieve the magicite and the grass. Cecilia and Yoki wait until Kramen and Sophia are asleep so Yoki can uses his wings to fly home in hours. Teal recovers and Gar is completely healed, so Yoki flies back to Cecilia all before Kramen and Sophia wake up the next morning. As a reward Cecilia lets the exhausted Yoki sleep with his head in her lap for the entire journey home.
7	"I Tried Getting Some Chocolate"; Transliteration: "Choko o Moratte Mita." (Japanese: チョコをもらってみた.)	Masato Uchibori	Ukyō Kodachi	Jun Yoshikawa	February 17, 2026
Yoki buys an outlandish outfit and starts calling himself Black Lightning Swordsman. In this persona he catches the thieves Envy, Jealousy and Heartburn. Duke advises him to give up the embarrassing Black Lightning persona and Yoki agrees after seeing himself in a mirror. Kramen reveals the thieves used to be adventurers who for some reason became obsessed with ruining Valentine's Day by stealing all the chocolate. Yoki eagerly awaits chocolate from Cecilia while watching everyone else he knows get some. He wanders miserably through town and sees young ladies giving chocolates to Yuga, cartloads of it. Mikana is flattered Yuga insists on accepting her chocolates first, despite the risk of food poisoning. The thieves escape prison on an earth golem to continue stealing chocolate from jealousy at having never received any themselves. Yoki refuses to let them win as long as there is a chance he will get chocolate from Cecilia. He destroys the golem and Yuga catches Envy, realising she is a girl. Envy admits she once tried to give chocolates but the boy rejected them because she was too tomboy-ish. Yuga convinces her not to give up on love, causing her to develop a crush on him. Yoki is thrilled when Cecilia gives him cookies and a cake for doing a good job.
8	"I Tried Saving a Mermaid"; Transliteration: "Ningyo o Sukutte Mita" (Japanese: 人魚を救ってみた。)	Aya Kawamura	Yukie Sugawara	Tomoe Makino	February 24, 2026
The merchant guild asks Yoki to investigate cargo being stolen in the port town Frimeille, accompanied by Happiness and Raven, who act awkwardly around each other. Happiness and Raven learn cargo is stolen even with guards watching closely, though some report memory loss after hearing singing. Raven suspects a mermaid. A witness informs Raven the sailors have been stealing their clients cargo and hiding it in the cave of the innocent mermaid Shike. They find the cargo and trap Shike, who admits the sailors have her friend Misaki hostage. Raven doesn't believe her but Happiness stands up to him. Despite not believing her, Raven agrees to investigate Misaki's whereabouts. As the cargo is fake, designed to lure them in to be put to sleep by Shike, they decide to wait for the sailors to arrive. The sailors are easily defeated and reveal Misaki's location, reuniting her with Shike. Shike and Misaki return to the ocean, with Raven admitting he was wrong to judge them just for being demons. Happiness is unexpectedly furious when Shike kisses Raven on the cheek, so she knocks Yoki unconscious so he won't see her give Raven a proper kiss.
9	"I Tried Learning More About The Girl I Love"; Transliteration: "Suki na Ko no Koto wo Shittemita" (Japanese: 好きな子のことを知ってみた)	Maki Kamitani	Yukie Sugawara	Masayoshi Nishida	March 3, 2026
Fearing he isn't making progress with Cecilia, Yoki asks Duke for advice and is told that he is too passive, so he needs to be more direct. Yoki asks Raven and Mikana for information about Cecilia. Mikana almost reveals Cecilia has a particular nickname, but Cecilia stops her. With Cecilia busy punishing Mikana, Raven reveals Cecilia volunteers at an orphanage where the orphans nicknamed her Holy Mother, confusing Yoki as to why. Yoki decides to take Cecilia on a quest to slay undead and impress her with how capable he is. Mikana points out as a priestess the undead are Cecilia's specialty so he would do better fighting as her equal to earn real trust. Unfortunately, Yoki bullies the Undead King, making everybody upset at him. Cecilia learns from the Undead King he was once a kind human, so she uses advanced holy magic to ensure he goes to heaven with his treasured crown. With Cecilia exhausted Yoki carries her back to the carriage. Mikana won't say if he did well or not but tells him to just keep doing what he does best, confusing him. Cecilia admits she doesn't like the Holy Mother nickname because Yuga claimed she was like the mom of their party, and called her Mom repeatedly in public.
10	"I Tried Hearing Out the Guardian Deity's Troubles"; Transliteration: "Mamorigami no Nayami wo Kiite Mita" (Japanese: 守り神の悩みを聞いてみた)	Yuki Kusakabe	Yukie Sugawara	Chiyo Ousaki	March 10, 2026
Gar decides to get a job. In his Black Lightning persona Yoki vouches for Gar to Kramen who lets Gar register as an adventurer. Cecilia decides to help in case Yoki causes trouble. Gar takes a job to find a missing cat but Yoki finds the cat with magic. Cecilia scolds him as Gar needs to learn to work by himself. After completing more quests Gar decides he is ready so he can start paying Teal back. Yoki decides to go on an A rank quest and is surprised Cecilia asks to go with him as it will mean several days alone together. It is revealed Cecilia is avoiding the King as the son of a very influential Lord has requested her hand in marriage, and refusal would have consequences. While investigating ruins for their archaeologist client Yoki uses Illusion Sphere to distract monsters, as the spell shows them whatever they want most. Cecilia is curious what she might see if affected by Illusion Sphere. Completing the quest, they return home and find Teal unhappy Gar was trying not to rely on her anymore. Yoki feels embarrassed for remaining in Black Lightning persona for four whole nights, but due to his usefulness Cecilia hopes to team up again sometime.
11	"I Tried Watching Over My Friend and My Former Subordinate"; Transliteration: "Yuujin to Moto Buka wo Mimamotte Mita" (Japanese: 友人と元部下を見守ってみた)	Shigeru Yamazaki	Yukie Sugawara	Shigeru Yamazaki	March 17, 2026
At Duke's suggestion Raven invites Happiness on a date. Raven's feminine voice is overheard by his vice-captain and he and the knights laugh at him. Humiliated, Raven runs away wishing he was brave like Yoki, but Yoki points out he only got through his recent quest with Cecilia by pretending to be Black Lightning. Raven returns to the date and Happiness forgives him. Happiness disappears but leaves a note asking Raven to find her. Yoki, Duke and Shiek track her in secret and learn Happiness wants to tell Raven she is a harpy. They are supportive, though it risks exposing them all. Raven stands up to his vice-captain and forces the knights to respect him. Celia is disappointed Cecilia hasn't told Yoki about the king arranging her engagement. Cecilia insists she will reject the engagement but Celia points out she must have some feelings for Yoki or she wouldn't have hidden the engagement from him. Raven challenges Yoki to a duel, causing Yoki to fear he hurt Happiness after learning the truth. It turns out he is actually getting revenge on her behalf for Yoki plucking all her feathers to disguise her as human. Yoki is glad it went well. Cecilia reveals she will be busy for several days, just as Yoki reveals he accepted a quest with Yuga that will take several weeks.
12	"I Tried Listening to My Crush's Arranged Marriage Plan"; Transliteration: "Suki na Ko no Omiai Hanashi wo Kiite Mita" (Japanese: 好きな子のお見合い話を聞いてみた)	Aya Kawamura	Yukie Sugawara	Shinichi Watanabe	March 24, 2026
Cecilia admits to Mikana the King has arranged a marriage meeting with a hero from the Luminaria Duchy, Soleil Graceheart. Soleil firmly believes without a demon king to fight heroes will become tools of war between kingdoms, so he asks Cecilia to marry him to show peace is possible. Yoki and Yuga are asked to clear monsters from a mine that are so cute the miners can't focus. Cecilia agrees to promote peace between kingdoms. Yuga tells Yoki about Cecilia's arranged marriage, causing Yoki to abandon the quest and fly home. Soleil admits he had a sheltered childhood, so he doesn't understand people very well, especially children. Cecilia feels guilty for not rejecting Soleil like she said she would. Yoki makes it back but in his demon form he is attacked by a masked warrior wielding blue flames and forced to retreat. Sophia shows Cecilia a wanted poster of Yoki as Black Lightning, claiming he is a criminal. Yoki manages to walk back into town where Cecilia heals him. Soleil is immediately suspicious and introduces himself as Cecilia's potential fiancée. Cecilia realises she hurt Yoki deeply by not telling him about the marriage meetings. As Yoki is known to be Black Lightning Duke pretends to arrest him.
13	"I Tried Being in a... with My Crush"; Transliteration: "Suki na Ko to...... ni Natte Mita" (Japanese: 好きな子と......になってみた)	Yukie Sugawara & Masato Uchibori	Yukie Sugawara	Susumu Nishizawa	March 31, 2026
Duke explains the masked warrior, Blue Flame, wears a similar mask to Black Lightning while completing low level quests for free, but causes chaos by doing the quest badly. Kramen asks Yoki to catch Blue Flame. Yoki is still upset about Cecilia's marriage while Cecilia is filled with guilt over hurting his feelings. Cecilia confronts Blue Flame over damaging Black Lightning's reputation, unaware Yoki was listening nearby. Blue Flame is jealous of Black Lightning and insists on duelling to prove he is a superior hero. Blue Flame insists Black Lightning must be obsessed with fame, so he is surprised he claims he only dresses as Black Lightning to look cool. Blue Flame considers finding his own way of helping people without impersonating Black Lightning. Cecilia scolds them both. Blue Flame insists his identity must remain secret so Yoki lets him escape and uses his own money to compensate Blue Flame's angry victims. Cecilia admits being around Yoki is the most fun she has ever had. Yoki asks Cecilia to be his girlfriend, but she asks him to wait until tomorrow then ask her again. The next morning Cecilia rejects Soleil, who hints he was Blue Flame and is interested in one day meeting the man behind the Black Lightning mask. Yoki confesses to her again and this time Cecilia admits she loves him too.

== See also ==
- Kunon the Sorcerer Can See, a light novel series whose manga adaptation is illustrated by La-na
