= List of Eyeshield 21 episodes (73–145) =

The anime series Eyeshield 21 is based on the manga series of the same name written by Riichiro Inagaki and illustrated by Yusuke Murata. The series is directed by Masayoshi Nishida and produced by TV Tokyo, NAS and Gallop The plot of the episodes follows Sena Kobayakawa, a student who becomes an American football player against his desire but eventually becomes the star of the team, wearing an eyeshield to protect his identity.

Episodes 73 between 145 of Eyeshield 21 aired from September 6, 2006, to March 19, 2008, on TV Tokyo. The episodes were later released in eighteen DVD compilations between January 26, 2007, and June 25, 2008, by Bandai Visual.

The series use seven pieces of theme music: three opening and four ending themes. The opening themes are "Dang Dang" by ZZ, used for the first thirty-one episodes, "Blaze Line" by Back-On, used from episode 104 to 136, and "Honoo no Running back" (炎のランニングバック; lit. Flaming Running back) by Short Leg Summer for the remaining episodes. The ending themes "Run to Win" by Aya Hirano, Miyu Irino, Koichi Nagano and Kappei Yamaguchi, used for the first twenty-eight episodes, "A day dreaming..." by Back-On, used between episode 101 and 116, "Flower" by Back-On from episode 117 to 126, and "Song of Power" by Short Leg Summer from episode 127 to 144. Episodes 87 and 145 use "Dang Dang" as the ending theme (nb: before the switch the original ending theme on the episode 145 was the opening 2 "Innocence").

== Episode list ==
No.	Title	Original release date	Ref(s).
73	"Fated Kick"; Transliteration: "Unmei no Kikku" (Japanese: 運命のキック)	September 6, 2006	
Kid tells Hiruma that he fell directly into his trap, and that everything is always too good to be true. Hiruma reminds Kid that he told him that Eyeshield would definitely win, and Kid tells Hiruma not to forget that he said Hiruma Youichi is the best quarterback in the league. They part ways, saying that the rest of the battle will be a battle of wits, and Hiruma decides to do an onside kick.
74	"A Pact Between Rivals"; Transliteration: "Raibaru no Chikai" (Japanese: ライバルの誓い)	September 6, 2006	
After losing to the Seibu Gunmen, Tetsuma saves Monta from getting Deimon suspended from playing. Hiruma reveals there is a seat left in the Tokyo Tournament so they still have a chance to be in the Christmas Bowl. Deimon attends a summer festival. Mamori invites Riku. Riku tells Sena to promise to remove his eyeshield mask before the Kanto Tournament.
75	"Spider's Threat"; Transliteration: "Supaidā no Kyōi" (Japanese: スパイダーの脅威)	September 13, 2006	
The Bando Spiders play against the Ojo White Knights. The Spiders are in the lead due to Kotarou's kick. Deimon is stunned that a small Bando player can take down Otawara and the team seems to know Ojo's passing routes. However, in the end, Ojo wins 14 to 3 and are set to play the Wild Gunmen.
76	"Come Back! Musashi!"; Transliteration: "Modore! Musashi!" (Japanese: 戻れ!ムサシ!)	September 20, 2006	
Deimon realizes that they will need a kicker to win their game against the Bando Spiders. Sena and Monta try and convince Musashi to rejoin their team; he reveals that he quit the team to take care of his father and their construction company. In the end, he promises to rejoin once his father recovers.
77	"The Real "21""; Transliteration: "Hontō no "21"" (Japanese: 本当の「21」)	September 27, 2006	
Sena and Suzuna go to retrieve their helmets and cleats at a store where Sena sees a helmet with an eyeshield on it. Akaba is revealed to be the owner of the helmet. Akaba proclaims he will defeat Eyeshield 21 and take the title that be believes rightfully belongs to him.
78	"The One That Waits Previously"; Transliteration: "Sono Sakini Matsumono" (Japanese: その先に待つもの)	October 4, 2006	
Mamori tries to help Sena, and Sena cannot find enough time to change into Eyeshield 21! So after school, he practices by himself by the riverside. After catching a cold because of training in the rain, Sena is forced to stay home during the Ojo vs. Gunmen game. Deciding to go, he manages to get there about halfway through the game, when Riku and Shin are in a showdown, but problems start when Mamori spots him and urges him to go home. Then, shy Sena says the words that Mamori was sure she would never hear: "Leave me alone! I want to be here right now!"
79	"Sena Kobayakawa"; Transliteration: "Kobayakawa Sena" (Japanese: 小早川瀬那)	October 11, 2006	
Before the match, Sena removes his helmet to reveal his identity to the world. Mamori accepts who Sena is. The game against the Bando Spiders begins.
80	"The Strongest Kick Team"; Transliteration: "Saikyō no Kikku Chīmu" (Japanese: 最強のキックチーム)	October 18, 2006	
Using a trick kick in the beginning of the game, Akaba recovers the ball and Kotaro scores a field goal. Things start to look bad for Deimon as they are apparently caught in a loop from the Spider's web, giving Bando a significant lead. Meanwhile, Musashi watches the game from his father's hospital room.
81	"The Truth of Red Pupil"; Transliteration: "Akai Hitomi no Shinjitsu" (Japanese: 赤い瞳の真実)	November 1, 2006	
The game continues to turn in the Spiders' favor, as they score yet another field goal, giving them a 20-point lead.
82	"Run! Musashi!"; Transliteration: "Hashire! Musashi!" (Japanese: 走れ!ムサシ!)	November 8, 2006	
Using a combination run with Hiruma, Sena is finally able to score a touchdown. Meanwhile, at the hospital, Musashi is told by his father to return to the Devil Bats. Encouraged also by his co-workers.
83	"Time that began to move" Transliteration: "Ugoki Dashita Jikan" (Japanese: 動き出した時間)	November 15, 2006	
Musashi arrives just in time and scores a 45-yard field goal, and Deimon is now only behind by eleven points. Towards the end of the episode, a strong wind arises, confusing the players.
84	"The Devil in the Storm"; Transliteration: "Arashi no Naka no Akuma" (Japanese: 嵐の中の悪魔)	November 22, 2006	
With the wind's speed increasing, passing is impossible, and Deimon is left with no other choice but to have Sena run the ball. Making use of Monta's catching abilities, and Hiruma's Devil Bat Laser Bullet, Deimon scores a touchdown.
85	"The Man Who is Loved by God"; Transliteration: "Kami ni Aisareta Otoko" (Japanese: 神に愛された男)	November 29, 2006	
Taki begins to cause problems for the Devil Bats in the critical fourth quarter of their game against the Spiders. Behind by 13 points, Deimon struggles desperately to close the point gap.
86	"Time Up of the Light and Shadow"; Transliteration: "Hikari to Kage no Taimu Appu" (Japanese: 光と影のタイムアップ)	December 6, 2006	
With four minutes left in the game, the score is 36-30, Bando to Deimon. Sena manages to get a touchdown with the continuous use of the Devil Bat Ghost. At 36-36, Deimon scores the last point with a kick.
87	"The Strongest Soldiers in Tokyo!!"; Transliteration: "Tōkyō Saikyō no Senshi-tachi!!" (Japanese: 東京最強の戦士達!!)	December 13, 2006	
Deimon has beaten the Spiders and are going to the Kanto Tournament, where the high-school champs of Kanto face each other to choose who will go to the Christmas Bowl. At the award ceremony, the All-Stars are announced. The defensive players are: Shin (Ojo), Kakei Shun (Poseidon), Habashira Rui (Chameleons), Buffalo Ushijima (Wild Gunmen), and Ootawara (Ojo). The offensive players are: Mizumachi (Poseidon), Yamamoto Onihei (Deers), Kurita (Deimon), Koutaro (Bando Spiders), Tetsuma (Wild Gunmen), Sakuraba (Ojo), Akaba Hayato (Bando Spiders), Kid (Wild Gunmen), Riku (Wild Gunmen) and Sena (Deimon). Shin wins the MVP award.
88	"Deimon's Halftime Show"; Transliteration: "Deimon Hāfutaimu Shō" (Japanese: 泥門ハーフタイムショー)	December 20, 2006	
A "halftime show" of short player-centric stories, interspersed with chibi shorts.
89	"Opening! Cream Puff Cup!!"; Transliteration: "Kaimaku! Shūkurīmu Kappu!!" (Japanese: 開幕!シュークリームカップ!!)	January 4, 2007	
The Cream Puff Tournament is a tournament in America where 4 teams representing different continents face each other. Representing Europe and Russia are the Northern Light Blizzards, Asia is represented by the Deimon Devil Bats, America is represented by the NASA Shuttles, and Africa is represented by the Savanna Survivors. The Blizzards play against the Shuttles and win.
90	"Brand New Trial"; Transliteration: "Aratanaru Shiren" (Japanese: 新たなる試練)	January 10, 2007	
Panther and a couple of the Devil Bats play a street game against a rival neighborhood to help Panther regain his love of football.
91	"Fighting Spirit! Death Climb"; Transliteration: "Tōkon! Desu Kuraimu" (Japanese: 闘魂!デス·クライム)	January 17, 2007	
Sena takes up wrestling in order to try to defeat Ivan's mammoth tackle.
92	"3 Brothers Of Texas Ranch"; Transliteration: "Tekisasu Bokujō no Sankyōdai" (Japanese: テキサス牧場の三兄弟)	January 24, 2007	
The Huh-Huh brothers take on a bull in order to train for the Creme Puff Cup.
93	"Yell Of Friendship"; Transliteration: "Yūjō no Ēru" (Japanese: 友情のエール)	January 31, 2007	
Devil Bats vs. Savanna Survivors. In the end, the Devil Bats easily win. After seeing the Devil Bats practice, Panther, Homer, and the others decide to get Coach Apollo back.
94	"Secret Weapon In Silverly White"; Transliteration: "Hakugin no Himitsu Heiki" (Japanese: 白銀の秘密兵器)	February 7, 2007	
Devil Bats vs Blizzards. Trailing 17-0 after the first half, the Blizzards send in their secret weapon to injure Sena. Meanwhile, the NASA Shuttles try to convince Coach Apollo to return to the team.
95	"Break down the Wall of Blizzard"; Transliteration: "Fubuki no Kabe o Buchiyabure" (Japanese: 吹雪の壁をぶちやぶれ)	February 14, 2007	
0-17 Blizzard to Deimon. Ivan's twin brother Wan has been placed on the field with current goals. They perform Snowstorm Tackle and knock Sena unconscious. The Blizzard gains 21 points and have the lead now. Deimon begins to lose faith in each other until Hiruma tells them they must do their best. They manage to stop the other team from scoring any more goals and Sena regains consciousness. Sena manages to beat the Snowstorm Tackle this time and gets a touchdown, winning the game 21-24.
96	"Now! To the Kanto Meet!"; Transliteration: "Iza! Kantō Taikai e!" (Japanese: いざ!関東大会へ!)	February 21, 2007	
Recap of the Fall Tournament
97	"Farewell, Onihei"; Transliteration: "Saraba Onihei" (Japanese: さらば鬼兵)	February 28, 2007	
The challenge to the Death Game has started. The first team to play against are the Hashiratani Deers. Kurita must face up to defeat his longtime hero Onihei.
98	"Chameleon's Counterattack!"; Transliteration: "Kamereon no Gyakushū!" (Japanese: カメレオンの逆襲!)	March 7, 2007	
Game 2 of the Death Game. Zokugaku vs Deimon. Using only 1st year students, Deimon tries to beat the Chameleons.
99	"Deimon High School Festival!!"; Transliteration: "Deimon Kōkō Gakuen-sai dā!!" (Japanese: 泥門高校学園祭だァ!!)	March 21, 2007	
Deimon has a school festival, where a large contest is being held. Everyone decides not to participate, since Hiruma will probably win, but now, it turns out Hiruma is not playing. The team divides into groups of three (Sena, Suzuna, and Omosadake; Monta, Mamori, and Kurita; Kuroki, and two cheerleaders; Ishimaru, Yukimitsu, and Komusubi; Togano, Musashi, and Taki; Jumonji and the team mascots). Each tries to outdo the others, but at the same time, for the very first time, Sena's enjoying the festival, where he's not treated like a gofer anymore.
100	"The Invisible Lock"; Transliteration: "Mienai Kusari" (Japanese: 見えない鎖)	March 28, 2007	
Sena starts to have nightmares about football. Hiruma gives the team a break to rest up. Riku invites Sena to watch the Ojo White Knights train. Shin and Sakuraba are training in the forest and Sena and Riku go after them. Everyone in the team goes to practice, leaving Sena in the woods. Sena gets lost and is saved from a bear by Shin. Shin tells Sena he is experiencing pressure from feeling he must win the game and that he should relieve it by practicing to gain confidence in his skills. Sena is able to relax now.
101	"Strongest Evil"; Transliteration: "Saikyō no Aku" (Japanese: 最強の悪)	April 11, 2007	
The regional champions go to a place where they decide which regional teams will play against who for the Christmas Bowl. Deimon is placed against Shinryuji. Poseidon challenges Shinryuji and Shinryuji wins. Agon comes after the match is over and calls the Poseidon team rubbish. Mizumachi tries to hit Agon but gets his shoulder dislocated by him.
102	"Overcome Your Fears"; Transliteration: "Osore o Koete" (Japanese: 怖れを越えて)	April 18, 2007	
Sena, Monta, and Suzuna visit Mizumachi in the hospital. When Mizumachi overhears how he could not beat Agon, he goes missing. Sena finds him crying and they talk. Mizu says he's afraid of Agon and Sena says he is too but he loves American football so he will continue to play it. Mizu realizes he's become afraid of football and decides to play a game with Sena to overcome it.
103	"The Iron Wall Double Stopper"; Transliteration: "Teppeki no Daburu Sutoppa" (Japanese: 鉄壁のダブルストッパー)	April 25, 2007	
Kyoshin and Bando team up to beat Deimon in the 3rd death game. Monta tries to prove to Kakei that he is a catching master and Sena tries to overcome the double-blocker by Kakei and Akaba.
104	"One Line Lacking"; Transliteration: "Hitotsu Kaketa Rain" (Japanese: 一つ欠けたライン)	May 2, 2007	
In the fourth death game against the Taiyo Spinx, Deimon is left short-handed after Jumonji gets arrested for beating up some punks who were harassing a young girl. The Sphinx declare that they too will forego going to the Kanto Tournament if they lose to Deimon; however, the game ends in a 7-7 tie after Jumonji makes a last-minute comeback, completing Deimon's line and opening up a hole for Sena to score a touchdown.
105	"The Final Death Game"; Transliteration: "Saigo no Desu Gēmu" (Japanese: 最後のデス·ゲーム)	May 9, 2007	
Deimon vs. the NASA Aliens. They use their death climb training in the game, ending with a score of 77-84!
106	"Fieresome God, Agon Kongo"; Transliteration: "Kishin Kongō Agon" (Japanese: 鬼神·金剛阿含)	May 16, 2007	
An interview with Hiruma and Agon. Later, Sena protects Mamori from Agon.
107	"The Enemy is Shinryuji"; Transliteration: "Teki wa Shinryūji ni ari" (Japanese: 敵は神龍寺にあり)	May 30, 2007	
A backstory of Hiruma, Kurita and Musashi who dreams to be part of the Shinryuji Football Team but Agon interferes.
108	"Detective Sena!?"; Transliteration: "Meitantei Sena!?" (Japanese: 名探偵セナ!?)	June 6, 2007	
The Devil Bats are given a night cruise on a ship to relax before the game. When dinner time comes, it turns out someone has eaten their dinner. Sena is put in charge of finding out who did it. Then a blackout occurs; when power is restored, Mamori's briefcase is missing and Monta has been kidnapped. Sena sees someone running and chases after that person. It turns out that was Shin and the Ojo White knights are also on the boat. The food was eaten by Otawara, Shin caused the blackout, the briefcase was never missing, and Monta was mistaken for a circus monkey and placed in a cage.
109	"Talent of Catching"; Transliteration: "KYACHI no sainou" (Japanese: キャッチの才能)	June 13, 2007	
Monta battles Ikkyu in a catching battle. Monta loses but vows to beat Ikkyu next time with 100% effort.
110	"Barrier of Talent"; Transliteration: "Sainō no Kabe" (Japanese: 才能の壁)	June 20, 2007	
Unsei explains to Sena and the others why he trains so hard. It is to keep Agon, his younger brother, from risking his career of being a football player by causing trouble with assaults and fights. His goal in life is for Agon to be the #1 football player.
111	"Go Forth, Devil Bats!"; Transliteration: "Shutsujin! Debiru Battsu!" (Japanese: 出陣!デビルバッツ!)	June 27, 2007	
Finally, the match with Shinryuji draws near. Doburoku tells Yukimistu that he will participate in this game, much to the team's delight. At Shinryuji, their coach shows them information that they have on the Devil Bats on a waterfall and projection screen, when Agon arrives (with two girls in tow) and says he will crush them all, Hiruma especially. Sena's face appears on the screen, and Agon suddenly throws one of the underclassmen into the waterfall, adding "And that piece of trash too." At that moment, Sena shudders because he suddenly has a bad feeling. Later that night, Suzuna texts Sena, asking him if he is afraid. Sena (thoroughly peeved) texts back that he's not scared, he just cannot believe that this is all happening. Suzuna asks him if this is his goal, to which Sena replies "No, I want to go to the Christmas Bowl, so we will win, I promise!" With that said, Suzuna smiles in her sleep, saying that she will be behind him, every step of the way.
112	"Devil vs God!"; Transliteration: "Akuma vs Kishin!" (Japanese: 悪魔vs鬼神!)	July 4, 2007	
The game begins. Shinryuji gets the lead on Deimon. Agon proves to be unstoppable, even for Hiruma. Agon and Unui show their best technique because of Hiruma's provocation. The Dragonfly is a move where Agon or Unsui is the quarterback and they pass to each other with an overhead throw. This confuses the opponent as to who has the ball.
113	"The Twelfth Athlete"; Transliteration: "12 Ninme no Asurīto" (Japanese: 12人目のアスリート)	July 11, 2007	
The first half ends with 32-0, Shinryuji in the lead. The second half begins after Hiruma tells the team to give up and try and not get injured. The team understands he means they should get rough, meaning that Musashi will kick the ball to the outfield. They catch the ball and Yukimatsu joins in for the next play. Yukimitsu knows where Hiruma will throw the ball; this move is called Option route, where Hiruma chooses the best place to throw the ball. Yukimitsu catches it and gets Deimon their first touchdown.
114	"Mediocre Power"; Transliteration: "Bonsai no Chikara" (Japanese: 凡才の力)	July 18, 2007	
Hiruma tells Sena that he has to blitz Agon on every play, but it just does not seem to work. Once, while Agon is about to pass the ball, he says that they are getting a "game over", which makes Sena suddenly furious, to the point where he forgets he is in a game and jumps to attack Agon, who dodges, but is slightly disturbed. After a while, Shinryuji goes with a run, which in reality is a trap. Sanzo back passes to Agon just as Sena rushes up. Because of Sena's intense concentration on Agon, Sena somehow sees the football, even though it is in his blind spot, and knocks it away with a superhuman jump to the side. Everybody goes for the ball, and Jumonji manages to get it, thanks to Kurita. As he runs with the ball, Agon catches up and stops him. Jumonji, realizing what Sena had to go through, takes one more step and crosses the goal line. It seems that everything will be all right, but then Sena's legs start to have problems, and Doburoku cools them down with an ice pack. In the meantime, Unsui notices that Agon has acknowledged Sena as a rival, and thinks that it is great. An intense rivalry aura develops between Agon and Sena, and Shin once again notes that Sena will be improving to no limits.
115	"Fighting to be Number One"; Transliteration: "Nanbā Wan o Kakete" (Japanese: ナンバーワンを懸けて)	July 25, 2007	
At the beginning of the episode Shin comments that even though each individual in Deimon is lacking, as a team they are already regarded as the strongest in Kanto, hinting the result of the game. This episode centers around Monta's individual battle with Ikkyu. Monta wins Ikyu in an aerial battle by snatching the ball away from him in mid-air, and scores a touchdown by successfully catching a long pass. Ikkyu finally admits Monta as a rival but still states that the 'Number One' in Kanto is still himself. Monta's successful touchdown brought back a momentum to the Devil Bats. Near the end of the episode Agon shows his true strength by imitating Sena's Devil Bat Ghost and passing Sena with it, proving the reign of natural physical talent such as himself as compared to the Sena who had completed the move by intensive training. Sena's knee starts hurting after he used Devil Bat Ghost too many times and caused an 'act' incident between Hiruma and Musashi about the future of a sports player. In the next play, Eyeshield 21 intercepts Unsui's 'Tranquil Reflections' by abandoning the post of defending the prodigy, Agon.
116	"The Will of a Warrior"; Transliteration: "Senshi no ishi" (Japanese: 戦士の意志)	August 8, 2007	
Sena grabs the ball and is about to score a touchdown when Agon gets in the way. Agon is about to strike down Sena, but when Agon suddenly insults the Devil Bats' dreams of going to the Christmas Bowl, Sena's newfound fury gets the best of him, and he tries to attack Agon. Agon chops Sena's arm away, and then tries to stop Sena, who uses the Devil Bat Ghost to get away. Agon chases after Sena, who suddenly realizes that the God Speed Impulse will not work on something Agon cannot see, so he pushes down on Agon's helmet in his blind spot. Sena actually slams Agon's head into the ground and scores a touchdown, making the score 35-28.
117	"Time Out Zero"; Transliteration: "Taimu Auto Zero" (Japanese: タイムアウト·ゼロ)	August 22, 2007	
58 seconds remain with the score at 35-28. Shinryuji leading the Deimon Bats. Deimon must score a touchdown in those 58 seconds to win. After gaining a short number of yards and spiking to stop the clock, Hiruma pulls a long pass to Monta. Monta catches it and with 4 seconds to go, is tackled by Agon 20 yards from the goal. The timer becomes zero and Deimon loses.
118	"Huddle Without Answers"; Transliteration: "Kotae Naki Hadoru" (Japanese: 答えなきハドル)	August 29, 2007	
It turns out that before Monta was tackled down, he reached his hand out and grabbed the grass on the "out of bounds area", stopping the clock and regaining those 4 seconds. Within those 4 seconds, Hiruma distracts the other team by causing an uproar in the audience. When it looks like Hiruma is getting the crowd worked up this sets him in motion and the ball is directly snapped to Sena. He runs it but gets covered by Agon. Sena then tosses the ball in the air and Hiruma catches it and scores by running it past Agon. The score is now 35 to 34. Touchdowns are worth 2 points now and kicks are worth one. With no chance to win in a tiebreaker, they must score a touchdown on the last play. Hiruma takes the ball and runs towards the Shinryuji defense line. He throws the ball in the air and Sena catches it and scores a touchdown, which wins the game 35 to 36.
119	"To the Limits of the Death Battle"; Transliteration: "Shito no Hateni" (Japanese: 死闘の果てに)	September 5, 2007	
After winning the game, the players line up to shake hands. Agon refuses to believe he lost and is about to attack Hiruma but Unsei punches Agon and takes the blame for their team's loss. Agon calms down and says they will beat Deimon next spring. Deimon celebrate their victory with a party while Hiruma sleeps after he is exhausted from the game.
120	"Super Dreadnaught! Dinosaurs!!"; Transliteration: "Chō Dokyū! Dainasōzu!!" (Japanese: 超弩級!ダイナソーズ!!)	September 12, 2007	
The Hakushu Dinosaurs are going to play the Taiyo Sphinx. Deimon comes to the stadium to watch the match. At the entrance Maruko introduces their star player, Gaou, to the Sphinx and says the Sphinx will lose. In the match the Sphinx take the lead in the game 0-21 until Gao joins from the benches, when it ends at 28-21 with every player on the Sphinx team injured and they are forced to forfeit.
121	"Battlefield of the Wolves"; Transliteration: "Ookami no senjou" (Japanese: 狼の戦場)	September 19, 2007	
Seibu Wild Gunmen vs. Misaki Wolves! Before the game, the Wolves' long-legged Kamiya Taiga taunts Riku by challenging Sena as his rival. It turns out he's not all talk, and as a result, Riku loses his cool. Could this mean elimination for Seibu?
122	"Rodeo Drive Stampede"; Transliteration: "Rodeo Doraibu Sutanpīdo" (Japanese: ロデオドライブ·スタンピード)	September 26, 2007	
Riku loses his cool and gets angry at the Wolves. This puts the whole team into frustration. Reassured by his teammates (including a very sick Tetsuma with a cold), Riku regains his calm and returns to the field with the debut of his perfected technique: Rodeo Drive Stampede! The game ends with 21-48, victory for the Gunmen.
123	"The Knight with No Weakness"; Transliteration: "Shikakunaki Kishi" (Japanese: 死角なき騎士)	October 3, 2007	
As a celebration of their progress, Mamori decides to buy Sena and Riku new shoes. On his way to meet them, Riku runs into Shin, who demands to be taught the running technique behind Rodeo Drive.
124	"Ultimate Spear!!"; Transliteration: "Kyūkyoku no yari!!" (Japanese: 究極の槍!!)	October 17, 2007	
Ojo White Knights vs. Sado Strong Golems! The rock-hard bodies of the Golems seem to present Ojo with a problem, but Shin reveals the "completed" version of Spear Tackle, the Trident Tackle. Ojo wins 42-0. In the end Hiruma's father calls him and says he waited for Hiruma at their meeting place but he did not come. His father says he is sorry he cannot see Hiruma at the Christmas Bowl as he has to leave Japan. Before he finishes talking, Hiruma hangs up and throws his cellphone away with his face hidden from the camera.
125	"White Knights High School Festival!!"; Transliteration: "Ōjō Kōkō Gakuen-sai dā!!" (Japanese: 王城高校学園祭だァ!!)	October 24, 2007	
Hiruma and the rest of the team go to spy on Ojo at their high school festival to find out about the ballista, but all of the other teammates except Hiruma, Kurita, and Musashi get caught up in the festival, namely a quiz show.
126	"Promise to Become an Ace"; Transliteration: "Ēsu e no Chikai" (Japanese: エースへの誓い)	October 31, 2007	
Torakichi realizes that Sakuraba's not the ace of Ojo. He sulks at a river until Sena and the others cheer him up. He returns and talks to Sakuraba, who says he will not be the ace until he is better than Shin and that's why he trains so much. The kid offers him a wristband that he asks Sakuraba to wear in the game against Deimon.
127	"Just for Victory"; Transliteration: "Tada, Shōri no Tame ni" (Japanese: ただ、勝利のために)	November 7, 2007	
Three days before the game between Deimon and Ojo, Hiruma takes the team on a helicopter to make them remember the lines where the defense of Ojo Knights are weakest. The coach makes the team wear masks that greatly reduce their oxygen intake, which will greatly increase their lung intake for one day. The coaches of Deimon and Ojo meet on the field where the game will take place and pour wine onto the grass so the heavens may help the losers of the match "recover" quicker.
128	"Devil vs. Man with the Speed of Light"; Transliteration: "Akuma vs. Kōsoku no Otoko" (Japanese: 悪魔vs光速の男)	November 14, 2007	
The two teams' catchers and running backs are interviewed the day before the match. Ojo's coach increases the difficulty of their training and 20 spare teams of Ojo quit due to it. Hiruma trains his pass and has a 96% accuracy. Sena trains with Hiruma and learns that his runs are too simple and that there is a fraction of a second where he stops when he does the Devil Bat Ghost.
129	"A Challenge to the King"; Transliteration: "Ōja e no Chōsen" (Japanese: 王者への挑戦)	November 21, 2007	
The day has come for the Ojo White Knights and Deimon Devil Bats to face each other. It is raining hard and the Deimon will start the attack. Finally Ikari will play in the game as his debut game; he is so pumped that he breaks a chain with brute strength. Sakuraba is utterly serious about taking the title of ace from Shin.
130	"Fanfare Start"; Transliteration: "Kaisen no Fanfāre" (Japanese: 開戦のファンファーレ)	November 28, 2007	
The battle between Ojo and Deimon has started, and Deimon gets to attack first. Hiruma made a strategy to help Sena catch the ball from the kick off. Sena catches the ball then runs straight for a touchdown, but Ojo's line blocks his way. Deimon's line defends Sena but fails. On the second try Sena succeeds in going through but Otawara blocks his way. On the third try, Deimon creates a strategy to defeat Ojo's line and Sena uses his Ghost against Otawara. Then he comes up against Shin but fails to pass using Devil Bat Ghost and gets hit by the Rodeo Drive + Spear tackle or the Trident Tackle.
131	"Prison Chain of Wrath"; Transliteration: "Ikari no Purizun Chēn" (Japanese: 怒りのプリズンチェーン)	December 5, 2007	
Ikari makes his debut play. He uses Prison Chain on Sena and blows him off the field, but he continues to attack Sena even when the referee blows his whistle. Jumonji defends Sena and gains a bruise on the arm. Ikari is assigned to come against Jumonji but he becomes scared every time it happens. It appears he had an experience with Ikari in middle school. He is encouraged by his father, which helps him defeat Ikari and Deimon makes their first down.
132	"The Knight who Commands the Sky"; Transliteration: "Sora o Seisuru Kishi" (Japanese: 空を制する騎士)	December 12, 2007	
Monta catches all the passes of Hiruma. The Ojo Knights are in a tight spot. Sakuraba asks if he can play, but he is denied because he is supposed to be the key in the second half. Hiruma decides to use the Shotgun Formation of the Gunmen against Ojo. After a play with Monta against a tall Ojo player (where Monta succeeds), Sakuraba with the help of Shin finally gets his coach's permission to join the defense. He starts to intercept and block Monta's catches.
133	"Ballista of the Kingdom"; Transliteration: "Ōkoku no Barisuta" (Japanese: 王国の巨大弓)	December 19, 2007	
The Bats are on their fourth down and 40 yards away from the goal. Musashi kicks the ball. It hits the goal and goes in. Now Ojo is on the offensive. Four Eyes (Takami) says that they will break through in front. Using Ballista, Shin runs in the opposite direction then breaks through the line (this include Kurita). Ojo gains their 1st down.
134	"Invincible Barrier"; Transliteration: "Muteki no Jōsai" (Japanese: 無敵の城塞)	January 4, 2008	
Takami once again tells Deimon which direction he will running The Ballista. Hiruma suspects that this is not the usual Takami but cannot seem to figure it out. The play beings and as said Shin runs to right. All defenders run to cover him but Takami then runs to the left for a QB SNEAK! As Deimons defenders run to intercept him he then passes an Everest Pass so high that the whole stadium thought Sakuraba would not be able to catch. As Monta tries to catch up Sakuraba stands by the end zone waiting for the ball but then Hiruma shows up and blocks Sakuraba! As Monta catches up the ball thens suddenly turns towards the out-of-bounds area. Still, Sakuraba jumps for the ball and catches it and tips a toe in the endzone for a touchdown. They go for a kick but Kurita, (who's been secretly squatting for the whole season) jumps to block the kick! 6-3 Ojo 6, Deimon 3.
135	"Peerless Superman"; Transliteration: "Hirui Naki Chōjin" (Japanese: 比類なき超人)	January 9, 2008	
Shin stops the passing game of Deimon forcing them to use Sena. Sena tries to pass Shin with the Devilbat Ghost, but Shin simply turns around to stop him with the Trident Tackle. However Shin says there battle is not over, as Sena's speed was not maxed out. Sena does another run and uses the Devil Light Hurricane (using opponents strength to push himself past), named by Hiruma, to pass by Shin on their third one-on-one. But Shin catches up right away and stops Sena, now also being equal in speed.
136	""21" Defeated"; Transliteration: "Haiboku no "21"" (Japanese: 敗北の「21」)	January 16, 2008	
Having achieved the speed of light as well, Shin declares himself the winner off the battle between him and Sena. On Sena's next run he loses the ball and Shin makes a touchdown making the score 13-3. After not being able to get a 1st down and with no way to stop Shin, Hiruma makes Mamori edit a video of Shin's match and tells everyone not to let Ojo get another point till half time. While Sena spaces out the rest of the Devilbats manages to get the ball back and Musashi makes a field-goal just before halftime making it 13-6 for Ojo. Hiruma tells Sena not wuss-out as there is no one who is unbeatable.
137	"Half Time of Fate"; Transliteration: "Unmei no Hāfutaimu" (Japanese: 運命のハーフタイム)	January 23, 2008	
Hiruma and Mamori go through the games footage to find a strategy. Meanwhile in Ojo's locker-room, Shin says a 7-point gap is not enough as Eyeshield 21 is a player that improves with shocking speed during a game. As Suzuna motivates Sena, Hiruma finds a way to defeat Shin. He tells Sena to push Shin away using his arm strength. Right before the second half the sun comes out. After which Hiruma comments that if they get through the first 10 minutes the rhythm of the match will turn in their favor.
138	"Ground Battle After the Rain"; Transliteration: "Ame Agari no Chijō-sen" (Japanese: 雨あがりの地上戦)	January 30, 2008	
Sena uses a speed-boost to compete in power with Shin (playing leadblock,) who knocks him away with some effort, giving Hiruma the chance to tackle the runner. However, the speed-boost and many Devilbat Ghosts in the first half, end up being to big a burden on Sena's legs and the give out on the next play. Hiruma tells him to keep playing but not run anymore, giving him chance to rest his legs. Everyone is now so focused on stopping Shin that it is obvious to Ichiro Takami, but Hiruma does not stop them from going after Shin. Takami uses the Everest Pass but it turns out that Monta was still focused at Sakuraba. Knowing he cannot make it if he looks back at the ball, Monta jumps up without looking.
139	"The 9999th Catch"; Transliteration: "9999 Kai no Kyacchi" (Japanese: 9999回のキャッチ)	February 6, 2008	
The episode starts off with Ojo throwing a long pass. Monta intercepts it without turning around to watch the ball. Hiruma points out that Monta no longer needs to see where the ball's heading and dubs Monta's move Devil Backfire. Deimon's ball, Hiruma throws long overhead passes and Monta uses the Devil Backfire to catch it. After 5 minutes, the field dries and Sena is able to run at full speed again. Sena grabs on to Monta when he catches a ball and uses the Devil Hurricane for a touchdown.
140	"Two Aces"; Transliteration: "Futari no Ēsu" (Japanese: 二人のエース)	February 13, 2008	
Sakuraba attempts the Devil Backfire but failes and makes a nasty fall losing consciousness. He has backflashes and loses confidence. But as he wakes to Torakichi (wheelchair kid) and sees him struggle to stand up for the first time since his hospitalization, Sakuraba returns to the field with renewed spirit. He suggests to use a new comby play with Shin named Sagittarius (Sakuraba gets a short pass and Shin blocks the defense going to tackle him). After several Sagittarius's a driven Sakuraba makes a touchdown, the score is now 20-13. The episode ends with Agon Kongo showing up in the tribunes.
141	"Devil Stun Gun Initiated!"; Transliteration: "Debiru Sutan Gan Hatsudō!" (Japanese: デビルスタンガン発動!)	February 20, 2008	
Score is 20-13, Ojo to Deimon. Deimon's ball. When Shin tries to tackle Hiruma, Sena learns how to block the Trident Spear with a new move dubbed by Hiruma the Devil Stun Gun, which is a move to knock the opponent down or knock his arm away. Sena uses it and runs towards the end zone with Shin right behind him. They both run the same speed so it would be impossible to catch up to Sena. Shin jumps towards Sena and manages to get a finger in Sena's shoe, causing him to trip. Sena tries to make the ball touch the endzone but is knocked away by Sakuraba. The ball belongs to Ojo now.
142	"Devil's Wings"; Transliteration: "Akuma no Ryōyoku" (Japanese: 悪魔の両翼)	February 27, 2008	
Deimon makes a safety, making the score 20-15 and getting the ball back. Yukimitsu collapses having played longer than ever and Monta's endurance is also shown to have run out. Sena tells him he will pass Shin. To get past him, Sena uses the Devilbat Hurricane right away followed by the Devil Stun Gun. It turns out not to not be enough and Sena lets go of the ball. As Sakuraba tries to catch the ball, Monta comes after him and pushes him out of bounds, keeping possession on Deimon's side. Having used the last of his energy and is about to collapse, Monta is caught by his hero, Honjo-san (old baseball player). With his hero telling him not to give up until the end, Monta is once again fired up.
143	"A Deep Attachment"; Transliteration: "Shūnen Hitotsu" (Japanese: 執念ひとつ)	March 5, 2008	
3 yards till the goal line and 1:21 minute left. Sena goes for a Devilbat Dive as Monta goes for a catch pose, leaving the choice to Hiruma. With the first two attempts Sena gets stopped 1 cm from the goalline by Shin. Deimon's last down and with the same setup Sena tries to make a pass to Monta as he does a high dive, but Shin causes a bad pass. Sakuraba has the advantage with his position but Monta makes a one-handed catch! Score 20-22 and less than a minute left as Ojo is coming up the field fast. Ishimaru (trackteam) gets injured and Hiruma struggles with whom to replace him with, until he sees the look in the exhausted Yukimitsu's eyes. With only 10 seconds left Shin goes on a bulldozing run. Two of the Ha-Ha brothers with the help of Yukimitsu finally take him down, but it is unclear if it is a touchdown or not.
144	"The Last Moment"; Transliteration: "Saigo no Setsuna" (Japanese: 最後の刹那)	March 12, 2008	
Shin successfully made the final touchdown for White Knights, making the score 27-22 to the White Knights. When all is lost, it was revealed that Yukimitsu gained one last second for the Devil Bats by pushing Shin into the end zone. This means that the Devil Bats have to steal the Ball from the White Knights and score a touchdown – all in one go; if Sena gets tackled, then all is over. The play starts and all is well until Monta gets the ball and is surrounded by some White Knights. Hiruma calculates their chances (0%) if he cannot get Sena to go near Monta & receive the ball or if Monta can pass the ball to Sena (which is impossible with Monta's lack of passing skills). Then Sena breezes past Hiruma which gives Hiruma an idea. He shouts at the nearby boys to gather with Monta. Hiruma, Monta, Sena and Taki gather in a tight midfield huddle and then break out of the huddle in different directions, confusing the White Knights and Takami. Eyeshield 21 is shown with the ball while surpassing all opponents except Shin. The episode ends in freeze-frame showing Sena and Shin charging towards each other. The omake shows a young Sena learning how to run with Riku. Shin suddenly breezes past Sena to give a man who dropped a coin from his car a few blocks back his money. Both Sena and Shin get a strange sense of premonition and stare at each other from across the street.
145	"Everybody, Let's Play American Football!"; Transliteration: "Minna Amefuto Yarouze!" (Japanese: みんなアメフトやろうぜ!)	March 19, 2008	
The final play comes down to Sena against Shin one on one. Shin's power and speed stopped Sena many times before. With time running short, Sena has the ball and runs to the endzone and Shin charges him head-on. Sena manages to get through Shin but he catches up and manages to knock Sena down with two fingers. Sena manages to get one hand on the ground to bounce back up. With the Devil Bat Dive running at 4.2 seconds, Sena uses Shin's Trident Tackle to go 4.1 seconds and gets the touchdown that wins the game. The next match will be Deimon against the Dinosaurs and the winner will go to the Christmas Bowl. Eight to nine years later, Sena is on a team with colors of grayish purple with a yellow lightning bolt. On getting the touchdown in the first few seconds Sena notices Hiruma on the opposite team. The series ends with Hiruma shouting "Everyone! Let's play American Football! Ya-Ha!"
