= Gekkou (studio) =

Japanese animation studio

Gekkou LLC.
- Native name: 合同会社月虹
- Romanized name: Gōdō-gaisha Gekkō
- Type: Gōdō gaisha
- Industry: Japanese animation, Voice acting
- Founded: December 2017; 8 years ago
- Headquarters: Nishi-Shinjuku, Shinjuku, Tokyo, Japan
- Number of locations: 4
- Key people: Minoru Hirata (CEO)
- Number of employees: 32 (Note: 20 producers, 5 photographers, 3 artists, 3 animators, and 1 manager)
- Subsidiaries: Byakko Douga
- Website: gekkou-tokyo.com

Gekkou Production, officially Gekkou LLC. (Japanese: 合同会社月虹, Hepburn: Gōdō-gaisha Gekkō) is a Japanese animation studio and talent agency based in Shinjuku, Tokyo founded in 2017.

In December 2023, Gekkou established a subsidiary studio called Byakko Douga Co, Ltd. (株式会社白狐動画), which is based out of the city of Yamaguchi, in Yamaguchi Prefecture.

In December 2025, Gekkou's voice acting division was spun off to establish G-One Co., Ltd., which in turn operates talent agency G-Pro.

== Works ==
=== Television series ===
Title	Director(s)	First run start date	First run end date	Eps	Note(s)	Ref.
My One-Hit Kill Sister	Hiroaki Takagi	April 8, 2023	June 24, 2023	12	Based on a web novel by Konoe.	
TenPuru	Kazuomi Koga	July 9, 2023	September 24, 2023	12	Based on a manga by Kimitake Yoshioka.	
Grandpa and Grandma Turn Young Again	Masayoshi Nishida	April 7, 2024	June 16, 2024	11	Based on a manga by Kagiri Araido.	
A Nobody's Way Up to an Exploration Hero	Tomoki Kobayashi	July 6, 2024	September 21, 2024	12	Based on a light novel by Kaitō.	
Demon Lord, Retry! R	Kazuomi Koga	October 5, 2024	December 21, 2024	12	Sequel to Demon Lord, Retry! by Ekachi Epilka.	
The Banished Court Magician Aims to Become the Strongest	Ken Takahashi	October 4, 2025	December 20, 2025	12	Based on a light novel by Alto.	
There Was a Cute Girl in the Hero's Party, So I Tried Confessing to Her	Yasutaka Yamamoto (Chief); Tomonori Mine	January 6, 2026	March 31, 2026	13	Based on a light novel by Suisei.	
Tune In to the Midnight Heart	Masayuki Takahashi	January 6, 2026	March 24, 2026	12	Based on a manga by Masakuni Igarashi.	
I Became a Legend After My 10 Year-Long Last Stand	Hiroyuki Kanbe	July 6, 2026	September 21, 2026	12	Based on a light novel by Ezogingitune.	
Everyone's Darling Has a Secret	Hikaru Sato	April 2027	TBD	TBD	Based on a manga by Kashiko Amane.	
Jimoto no Ijimekko-tachi ni Shikaeshi Shiyōto Shitara, Betsu no Tatakai ga Hajimatta	Chihiro Kumano	2027	TBD	TBD	Based on a manga by Kengo Matsumoto.	
Tune In to the Midnight Heart (season 2)	Masayuki Takahashi	2027	TBD	TBD	Sequel to Tune In to the Midnight Heart.	

=== Original net animation (ONA) ===
Title	Director(s)	First run start date	First run end date	Eps	Note(s)	Ref.
Youkoso Dystopia e	Yuzo Yamamoto	October 4, 2024	December 23, 2024	12	Original work.	
