= List of Eyeshield 21 episodes (1–72) =

The anime series Eyeshield 21 is based on the manga series of the same name written by Riichiro Inagaki and illustrated by Yusuke Murata. The series is directed by Masayoshi Nishida and produced by TV Tokyo, NAS and Gallop The plot of the episodes follows Sena Kobayakawa, a student who becomes an American football player against his desire but eventually becomes the star of the team, wearing an eyeshield to protect his identity.

Episodes 1 between 72 of Eyeshield 21 aired from April 6, 2005, to August 30, 2006, on TV Tokyo. The episodes were later released in eighteen DVD compilations between July 22, 2005, and December 22, 2006, by Bandai Visual.

The episodes use seven pieces of theme music: three opening and four ending themes. The opening themes are "Breakthrough" by Coming Century, used for the first thirty-five episodes, "Innocence" by 20th Century, used between episode 36 and 64, with the rest using "Dang Dang" by ZZ. The ending themes are "Be Free" by Ricken's, for the first thirteen episodes, "Blaze Away" by The Trax, from episode 14 to 35, and "Goal" by Beni Arashiro and "Run to Win" by Aya Hirano, Miyu Irino, Koichi Nagano and Kappei Yamaguchi, used for the episodes 36 to 64 and remaining episodes respectively.

== Episode list ==
No.	Title	Original release date	Ref(s).
1	"The Man with the Lightspeed Legs!"; Transliteration: "Kōsoku no Ashi o Motsu Otoko" (Japanese: 光速の脚をもつ男)	April 6, 2005	
Sena Kobayakawa manages to enter Deimon High, the same school his friend Mamori Anezaki is currently attending. On his first day, all goes well until he runs into three bullies known as The Ha-Ha Brothers. As they drag him into the Football club to beat him up, Ryokan Kurita arrives and scares them away, thinking they wanted to join the Football club. Sena asks to be the team manager for Deimon Devil Bats and becomes friends with Kurita. On the way home, he again runs into the Ha-Ha brothers, who attempt to take his phone to find Kurita and assault him. Sena manages to run away from them, revealing his great speed and agility. Yoichi Hiruma happens to witness Sena's abilities as he escapes from the bullies. The next day, Hiruma forces Sena to join the team as a running back under the alias "Eyeshield 21".
2	"Let's Play Football!"; Transliteration: "Amefuto Yarouze!" (Japanese: アメフトやろうぜ!)	April 13, 2005	
Sena arrives at school early to do some training. Hiruma has Sena and Kurita do the 40-yard dash to see how fast they are. Kurita gets 6.5 seconds and Hiruma gets 5.1 seconds, while Sena manages the "Speed of Light," 4.2 seconds, thanks to Hiruma making Sena the bait for his pet dog Cerberus. Later, Hiruma conscripts Sena and Kurita into helping him recruit nine more players for the team so they can meet the player count requirements; the one to hire the lowest would face a penalty from Hiruma. Sena manages to recruit Tetsuo Ishimaru to the team, while Hiruma retrieves the rest. They are now ready to play American Football.
3	"Blaze a Path Down the Field!"; Transliteration: "Fīrudo o Nejifusero" (Japanese: フィールドをねじふせろ)	April 20, 2005	
It is Eyeshield 21's debut game -- a match against the Koigahama Cupids, whose players often bring their girlfriends to their game. Shin and Sakuraba from the Ojo White Knights also appear as spectators, recording the game.
4	"What I Hold In My Hands!"; Transliteration: "Sono Te ni Tsukamumono" (Japanese: その手に掴むもの)	April 27, 2005	
The Deimon Devil Bats have won their first game of the year. However, their next match is against the Ojo White Knights, one of the best teams in Japan. Also, Mamori is accepted to join the American Football Club as manager, while Sena acts as secretary.
5	"Half-Second Bodyguards!"; Transliteration: "0.5 Byo no Bodīgādo" (Japanese: 0.5秒のボディーガード)	May 4, 2005	
Intimidated by the imposing statures of the White Knights players, Sena thinks of quitting American Football. Kurita reminds him that he has guards around him, so things will be alright.
6	"The Pierce of the Spear Tackle!"; Transliteration: "Sakuretsu! Supia Takkuru" (Japanese: 炸裂!スピアタックル)	May 11, 2005	
The Deimon Devil Bats are up 6-0. However, the Ojo White Knights' ace linebacker Shin is put into play, turning the tide in favor of the White Knights.
7	"Fighting to Win!"; Transliteration: "Katsu Tame no Tatakai" (Japanese: 勝つための戦い)	May 18, 2005	
The Deimon Devil Bats are in trouble once Shin joins the game. Eyeshield 21 does not want to play any longer after suffering from Shin's Spear Tackle. The Ojo White Knights' Sakuraba, on the other hand, has to decide between the game or fame. Hiruma threatens to leave the match halfway through, until Eyeshield 21 promises to defeat Shin even once.
8	"Never Quit!"; Transliteration: "Akiramenai!" (Japanese: あきらめない!)	May 25, 2005	
The Deimon Devil Bats are already sure to lose the game, but Eyeshield 21 is still determined to get past Shin. Eyeshield 21 runs into the Ojo White Knights' Sakuraba, who goes onto the field accidentally to retrieve his last promotional sticker from his idol manager, Miracle Ito. The popular idol is injured as a result and his fans blame this incident on Eyeshield 21. Eyeshield 21 gets past Shin at last and scores Deimon's last touchdown. Shin thinks that Eyeshield 21 is at "a speed where all the power in the world would not be able to touch him." Results: Ojo White Knights defeat Deimon Devil Bats 68 to 12. Sena thinks to return to his normal life but then realizes his true love for American Football; Hiruma persuades him to start preparing for a more important tournament, the Autumn Tournament, which decides the contestants for the Christmas Bowl.
9	"The Catching Master!"; Transliteration: "Kyacchi no Tatsujin" (Japanese: キャッチの達人)	June 1, 2005	
The episode begins with Sena walking to school holding a football. A baseball lands at his feet and Raimon "Monta" Taro comes to retrieve it. When told to give Monta the ball, Sena throws the football, but it slips from his hand. Monta saves it splendidly from getting run over by a truck. Monta is put in the third string of the baseball team, the reserves of the reserves, due to his inability to throw or bat. Sena convinces him to play football, since the Devil Bats need a specialized catcher, a wide receiver. Monta accepts the offer after watching an interview of his baseball idol, thus becoming Devil Bats #80.
10	"A Hero's Qualifications!"; Transliteration: "Hīrō no Shikaku" (Japanese: ヒーローの資格)	June 8, 2005	
In the previous match between the Devil Bats and the White Knights, Eyeshield 21 accidentally ran over Sakuraba, causing Sakuraba to be hospitalized. Hiruma poses as Eyeshield 21 and taunts that the accident was not accidental. Monta and Sena decide to go to the hospital to personally apologize for what happened. "Ace" Sakuraba reveals his feelings of inferiority to the true ace, Shin, and his true reasons to be a TV idol, to attract more attention. Torakichi, Sakuraba's fan, encourages Sakuraba to train hard to be a true American Football player.
11	"Oath Under the Setting Sun"; Transliteration: "Yūhi no Chikai" (Japanese: 夕陽の誓い)	June 15, 2005	
Hiruma has just arranged a practice match against the Zokugaku Chameleons, a team notorious for dirty play and led by linebacker Rui Habashira, who has extremely long arms. Sena and Monta are about to buy backup gear for their next match when a motorcyclist steals their money. With Shin's help, the two are able to retrieve it. Shin tells them that he and the White Knights will be waiting for the Devil Bats in the finals.
12	"Max Catch!"; Transliteration: "Kyacchi! Makkusu!!" (Japanese: キャッチ!マックス!!)	June 22, 2005	
It is the Deimon Devil Bats vs the Zokugaku Chameleons. After being tackled by Habashira, Sena starts imagining Habashira being everywhere, thus becoming petrified. Will Sena be able to snap out of it and achieve victory for the Deimon Devil Bats?
13	"The Terror of the Chameleon!"; Transliteration: "Kamereon no Kyōfu" (Japanese: カメレオンの恐怖)	June 29, 2005	
Eyeshield 21 watches as Monta gets up after being tackled again and again. Monta puts on a brave face and encourages Sena despite being heavily battered and barely able to walk straight. Soon, Sena realizes that he does not need to fear Habashira, since he has faced a better linebacker in Shin. The Devil Bats defeat the Chameleons with a score of 46-28, which, due to a bet made prior to the game, results in the whole Zokugaku gang becoming Hiruma's new slaves.
14	"The Scorching Hell Tower"; Transliteration: "Shakunetsu no Heru Tawā" (Japanese: 灼熱のHELL TOWER (ヘル タワー))	July 6, 2005	
Due to a great number of applicants for the American Football Club, Hiruma decides to hold a try-out. He rents the Tokyo Tower for the whole day, and instructs the applicants that they must carry ice to the top of the tower and reach with top with at least one ice cube still intact. Hiruma even places obstacles along the way, further heightening the difficulty of the challenge. Kurita finds an apprentice in Komusubi, and four more players are accepted: the Ha-Ha Brothers and the weak but persistent Manabu Yukimitsu.
15	"Find Eyeshield!"; Transliteration: "Aishīrudo o Sagase!" (Japanese: アイシールドを探せ!)	July 13, 2005	
Hiruma realizes that Eyeshield 21 has good acceleration but bad stamina, so he asks all Deimon students to hunt down Eyeshield 21 or he will spread scandalous information about them. He also promises his Zokugaku slaves that he will release them if they find out who Eyeshield is. Mamori, who also wants to find out Eyeshield's identity, follows him around and is abducted by Hibashira and his gang to be bait for Eyeshield. Sena reveals his identity, but Hiruma makes every Devil Bat member put on #21 uniforms and eyeshields to make Hibashira believe that Sena is a fake. Since Hibashira cannot find out who Eyeshield really is, their slavery is extended for another three months.
16	"Farewell Kurita?!"; Transliteration: "Sayonara, Kurita!?" (Japanese: さよなら、栗田!?)	July 20, 2005	
Kurita has been accused by shop owners of ruining their decorations for a festival. Knowing that the Devil Bats will be disqualified for the Christmas Ball if one of the members has to face disciplinary action, Kurita withdraws from the team. Other Devil Bats members look for the real culprits to make them confess so that Kurita does not have to leave the team. With the help of the two American girls who were being bullied by the culprits the night of the disaster, Kurita's name is cleared. At the end of the episode, it is revealed through a TV broadcast that the Statue of Liberty is carrying a flag that informs the public of the current recruitment for the Devil Bats. The team understands that Hiruma asked the girls to fly back to Japan from New York in order to act as Kurita's witnesses.
17	"The Kid and Iron Horse"; Transliteration: "Kiddo & Aian Hōsu" (Japanese: キッド&アイアンホース)	July 27, 2005	
The Deimon Devil Bats are going to hold a barbecue lunch. However, it is still part of the training Hiruma wants to give the new teammates. Hiruma orders them to memorize passing routines for football. Hiruma tosses out the meat as though he is passing the ball, so whoever has memorized the routines gets to eat the meat. In order to make his teammates understand how important memorizing passing routines is, Hiruma takes them to the game between the Ojo White Knights and the Seibu Wild Gunmen. Kid and the Iron Horse belong to the Gunmen, and because the Iron Horse knows all of his routines well, the Gunmen are in the lead. Ojo still wins, however, because the Iron Horse has to sit half of the game out.
18	"A Slacker's Pride"; Transliteration: "Rokudenashi no Puraido" (Japanese: ろくでなしのプライド)	August 10, 2005	
A magazine publishing company needs a Japanese football team to compete against an American team, and thus holds a contest for it. Hiruma applies, but finds out that the editor has already decided that it will be the Taiyo Sphinx who will compete against the NASA Aliens. Back at the school, the Ha-ha Brothers have already decided that they are quitting the team even though Hiruma is still blackmailing them with their naked pictures. In a restaurant, they hear some members of the Taiyo Sphinx talking about how useless they are as defensive linemen. The brothers are beaten up by a Sphinx member, and to get revenge, decide to return to the team and help the Devil Bats defeat the Sphinx.
19	"The Lower-class Laughs At Its Challengers!"; Transliteration: "Shoshimin wa Chōsen-sha o Warau" (Japanese: 小市民は挑戦者を笑う)	August 17, 2005	
It is a game between the Sphinx and the Devil Bats for the right to represent Japan against the Aliens. The Sphinx prides itself on the heaviest line in Japan. After suffering from a Sky-Blue, Kurita is already losing heart, but Hiruma reminds him that they need to win the Christmas Bowl, thus restoring Kurita's confidence. The special strategy practiced by the Huh-huh Brothers is revealed: a "scumbag scramble" taught to them by Zokugaku's Hibashira and his gang.
20	"The Sphinx's Secret Weapon!"; Transliteration: "Sufinkusu no Himitsu Heiki" (Japanese: スフィンクスの秘密兵器)	August 24, 2005	
When the going gets tough for them, the Sphinx reveals their secret weapon: a freshman called Kamaguruma who uses his "chariot bump" against Monta in order to stop Monta from catching Hiruma's passes.
21	"Fly, Devil Bat!"; Transliteration: "Tobe! Debiru batto" (Japanese: 翔べ! デビルバット)	August 31, 2005	
The Devil Bats are trailing to the Sphinx. Hiruma insists that Monta catches his passes, reminding Monta that the outfield is his backyard. The match ends with a draw.
22	"A Mysterious Girl Appears!"; Transliteration: "Nazo no Shōjo Arawaru" (Japanese: 謎の少女現る)	September 7, 2005	
A sixteen-year-old expert inline skater and part-time reporter named Taki Suzuna is searching for Eyeshield 21's real identity, stalking the Devil Bats team. She challenges him to race her, starting from a shrine all the way to the bottom of the hill. Sena has no choice but to accept, because if he does not, she will write an article on how spineless he is. But when an accident occurs, Sena has to save Suzuna before she plunges to her death in the forest below.
23	"The Weightless Man!"; Transliteration: "Mujoryoku no Otoko" (Japanese: 無重力の男)	September 7, 2005	
The American team accepts the game against the Deimon Devil Bats. Sena and a man called Panther each learn how fast the other is. Wanting to go up against each other, they do their best to ensure total victory for their team. There is one problem, though: the American coach hates Panther, and will not let him play. The only hope for Panther to play against Sena lies in the capture of a cat.
24	"Blitz! Japan vs. USA!"; Transliteration: "Dengeki! Nichimei Kessen" (Japanese: 電撃! 日米決戦)	September 14, 2005	
The NASA Aliens and the Deimon Devil Bats are ready for their game, but unless the blitz works, Deimon learns they will be deported from Japan. Can Sena use his speed to stop the tag team duo of Homer and Watts?
25	"The Caged Black Panther!"; Transliteration: "Ori no Naka no Kurojō" (Japanese: 檻の中の黒豹)	September 21, 2005	
Trailing 14-6, Deimon has managed to stop the Shuttle Pass and is slowly progressing the ball with the sweep, but Sena wants to embarrass the Aliens and allow Panther on the field. Will Panther finally get his time to shine?
26	"A Real Beast!"; Transliteration: "Yasei no Riaru" (Japanese: 野生のリアル)	September 28, 2005	
Trailing 26-21, the NASA Aliens finally unleash Panther and their new Moonsault Formation. Shin watches eagerly as he realizes a new speedster could threaten his reign, but will either team manage to win the wager, and what will happen if both lose?
27	"Take Back Cerberus!"; Transliteration: "Dakkan! Keruberosu" (Japanese: 奪還!ケルベロス)	October 5, 2005	
Hiruma drags his team out of Japan to Houston for a bootcamp. He brings Cerberus with him, asking Sena to look after the dog. On the airplane is a little girl who has a stuffed toy that looks like Cerberus. Beside the little girl sit two wanted men. The men put a big jewel inside the stuffed toy when the girl is sleeping. Jumounji, going to the bathroom because he feels airsick, brings the stuffed toy back to Cerberus' seat when he returns. The little girl mistakes Cerberus for her stuffed toy and lures him into a suitcase with beef jerkies. Sena and the others have to look for Cerberus before Hiruma finds out about the loss.
28	"American Football Downtown!"; Transliteration: "Amefuto·Dauntaun" (Japanese: アメフト·ダウンタウン)	October 12, 2005	
When Sena and Monta get lost in America, they end up at a football field where Panther learned to play. Panther's grandmother notices how well they can play, and asks if they could play with their team. As soon as the match is over, a player's wife goes into labor. The doctor is out fishing on the beach, so Sena needs to get him before it becomes too late. Meanwhile, Hiruma finally finds what he is looking for.
29	"Ultimate Combo! The Devil Gunmen!"; Transliteration: "Kessei·Debiru Ganmanzu" (Japanese: 結成·デビルガンマンズ!)	October 19, 2005	
Hiruma orders the members of Devil Bats to go to the beach. Sena, Mamori, and Monta come across the Seibu Wild Gunmen's coach and Kid. They form a five-man team that will compete in a beach football game for the prize of a Texan beef carcass and $1000. Due to Mamori's presence, Sena cannot perform well. After a while, Tetsuma arrives to wake Kid up (he was ordered by Kid to wake him up after three hours) and thus replaces the coach. Hiruma, who is trying to convince an old man to be the Devil Bats' coach, sees the Wild Gunmen and replaces Mamori. They win the tournament, and the old man tells Hiruma that he is going to think about the offer.
30	"At the Gates of Hell!"; Transliteration: "Jigoku e no Kyōkai-sen" (Japanese: 地獄への境界線)	October 26, 2005	
The Devil Bats are resting at the Wild Gunmen ranch. The coach has agreed to train them. Hiruma mentions that Deimon does not allow extracurricular activities after the second year so it is his and Kurita's last chance for the Christmas Bowl. That means they must improve in 40 days, not 405 (a year plus 40). Hiruma says the team must do the death march and that he will complete it even if it kills him. On the day the Devil Bats are supposed to return to Japan, the whole team chooses to go through the death march along with Hiruma and Kurita.
31	"Minds Made Up!"; Transliteration: "Sorezore no Ketsui" (Japanese: それぞれの決意)	November 2, 2005	
The death march training begins. Monta and Yukimitsu must run routes while Hiruma shoots them. The defensive linemen must push a truck. Sena has to kick a rock across the whole 2000 km. The NASA Aliens have changed their name to the NASA Shuttles to escape Hiruma's promise, which bans them from returning to the US. Shin is hiking on Mt. Fuji every day. Panther tries to challenge Shin and loses. Panther asks Shin if Sena would have gotten past him; Shin says possibly if he gets past his weakness.
32	"Quitters?"; Transliteration: "Makeinu wa Iruka" (Japanese: 負け犬はいるか)	November 9, 2005	
The training and the heat intensify as the team treks across Texas, but when the situation continues to get rougher, it could lead to one or two people trying to quit altogether. Is this the end of the Devil Bats' training?
33	"OH! My Sister!"; Transliteration: "OH! Mai Shisutā!" (Japanese: OH!マイシスター!)	November 16, 2005	
Sena accidentally kicks the rock into a motorcycle gang. Knowing that he will have to run the whole Death March again if he loses it, he runs after them, and gets separated from the rest of the team. There, he literally crashes in Suzuna, who is still looking for her missing brother. They go to a stadium where a professional American Football tryout is being held. It turns out that her brother is there, hoping to become a professional. When the tryout starts, Sena goes in, but is overwhelmed by the crowd. Will he be able to survive, and help Suzuna's brother to achieve his dreams?
34	"Signs of a Ghost!"; Transliteration: "Gōsuto no Taidō" (Japanese: ゴーストの胎動)	November 23, 2005	
Sena applies all the training from the death march in the match. When he scores the winning goal, Sena's last opponent declares that he saw a ghost beside Sena as he ran. When the names of those who passed are read out, Suzuna's brother's name is skipped. He did not make it, and so Sena asks him to become a member of the Deimon Devil Bats. He accepts, and the Taki siblings and Sena leave. Right after that, the announcer says Sena's name...
35	"A Solitary Death March!"; Transliteration: "Kodoku no Desu Māchi" (Japanese: 孤独のデス·マーチ)	November 30, 2005	
Yukimitsu collapses during the run. If he does not complete the run, he will be dropped from the team.
36	"The Final Trial!"; Transliteration: "Saigo no Shiren" (Japanese: 最後の試練)	December 7, 2005	
The Devil Bats truck gets stuck in a pothole; with one final push together as a team, Deimon overcomes the last obstacle. Arriving in Las Vegas, on the pirate boat outside Treasure Island, Doburoku confronts Sena to see if the ghost move is complete. Sena passes through Doburoku with the new Devil Bat ghost move, and Doburoku realizes Sena's unlimited potential. At the hotel, everyone rests in preparation for the journey home. The next day, Hiruma sells Doburoku's truck and tells him to go to the casino and bet his all on roulette 21#'s on red 21. The money pays off Doburoku's debt and he returns to Japan with the team.
37	"The Distant Peak"; Transliteration: "Harukanaru Itadaki" (Japanese: 遥かなる頂)	December 14, 2005	
The Devil Bats return to Japan, but Hiruma informs them that Ojo lost to Shinryuji. Meanwhile, Sakuraba reaches a breaking point and seriously considers his future as a football player.
38	"The New Starting Lineup?!"; Transliteration: "Regyurā Ketsutei!?" (Japanese: レギュラー決定!?)	December 21, 2005	
The Deimon Devil Bats have returned home. Hiruma must decide on the regular players. Everyone but Yukimitsu is chosen. Yukimitsu will continue to be a bench player.
39	"The Road to the Christmas Bowl!"; Transliteration: "Kurisumasu Bouru e no Michi" (Japanese: クリスマスボウルへの道)	January 11, 2006	
While hiding from a group of television interviewers, Suzuna questions why Sena does not tell Mamori who he is. This leads to a quick review of the previous 38 episodes. In Japan this aired as an hour-long special with 40. Sena tells Suzuna that he will tell Mamori his identity when he is truly strong, namely when he defeats his ultimate rival, Shin Seijuro.
40	"The Night Before the Game!"; Transliteration: "Kessen Mae Yoru!" (Japanese: 決戦前夜!)	January 11, 2006	
Kurita and the other Devil Bats learn that one loss means their entire dream will end. Once he gets home, Kurita goes into hiding, not wanting to be the cause of the Devil Bats' failure. Can the others convince him to come out?
41	"The Ace's Missing?!"; Transliteration: "Ēsu Ketsumetsu!?" (Japanese: エース消滅!?)	January 18, 2006	
Deimon are up against Amino, a school where they use medical science to increase their muscle sizes. They are all artificial muscles. Sena follows "idiot" Taki onto the wrong bus and ends up to a faraway place, Nagano. Meanwhile Deimon, without their ace, must defeat Amino. At first the Deimon defensive linemen cannot hold Amino back and have a touchdown scored on them. Then Doburoku brings in a truck and tells them to push it until they remember how to push with their hips instead of just their arms, just like during the Death March. Deimon pushes through the line and Monta catches a ball for a first down. Current score 7-0.
42	"The Devil Bat Ghost!"; Transliteration: "Debiru Batto Gōsuto!!" (Japanese: デビルバットゴースト!!)	January 25, 2006	
Chameleon Habashira Rui gives Sena a lift to the stadium on his motorcycle. In the game, Amino decides to target Monta and tackle him on offense and defense. Amino scores another touchdown and Ishimaru and Monta both score touchdowns for Deimon. The current score is 14-12. Sena is launched off the bike and lands in the stadium with a flashy appearance. He reveals his Devil Bat Ghost, a technique where a runner increases his speed and turns so that the opponent cannot predict where the runner will turn, while the linebacker sees a ghostly image where the player seems to have disappeared like smoke. Shin acknowledges that Sena has grown again. The final score is 36-14, Deimon's first victory.
43	"The Legendary 60-Yard Magnum"; Transliteration: "Densetsu no 60 Yādo Magunamu" (Japanese: 伝説の60ヤードマグナム)	February 1, 2006	
Monta and Sena are reluctant to recruit the legendary kicker "60 yard Magnum" Musashi back onto the team. Being misled by soccer students who say a person called "MUro SAtoSHI" is Musashi, Monta and Sena try to recruit him into the American Football team. Meanwhile, a player called Sasaki Koutarou, the Bando Spiders' famed "smart" kicker, appears to challenge Musashi. Will Sena and Monta be able to convince Musashi to rejoin the team?
44	"A ha ha! My debut!" Transliteration: "Ahāhā! Boku Debyū!!" (Japanese: アハーハー!ボクデビュー!!)	February 8, 2006	
Taki must pass the entrance exam to be able to play for Deimon. Suzuna tells them Taki has failed every single school with American football in Japan (except Deimon which has accepted every student due to their small number of application students, but Natsuhiko left Japan before being accepted). It turns out Taki is indeed an idiot and Suzuna leaves in frustration, with Sena following to comfort her. As it turns out, Taki can answer the question if it is somehow related to American Football. Taki does the exam; a bare pass is 200. At night as the marker is marking the sheet when Hiruma's shadow appears behind him. As the marker announces Taki is safe with 203 points, Hiruma's shadow disappears, and the marker also mentions how he feels that he is the one who "made it." Deimon beats the Zokugaku Chameleons in a practice match because of Taki. At the end, the Zokugaku Chameleons are seen carrying their motorcycles on their backs home as their punishment from their manager, Megu Tsuyumine.
45	"The Ghost is Sealed?!"; Transliteration: "Gōsuto Fūin!?" (Japanese: ゴースト封印!?)	February 15, 2006	
Hiruma forbids Sena to use the Devil Bat Ghost until a real game in order to keep spies from getting looks at it. Meanwhile Shin and Ootawara from Ojo have begun practicing in a corporation league, the Shuei Elephants, to better hone their skills. The freshmen of the Devil Bats have decided to go to the same stadium, Shuei Stadium, to inspect the next playing field. The Shuei Elephants and the Samurai Warriors have an important practice match together, but Taki Natsuhiko leads some of the Samurai Warriors' regulars onto the wrong bus to Nagano Hot Springs (again). Due to the Samurai Warriors' lack of players in the match, Komusubi and Monta substitute and play in the corporation league practice match. Sena is determined to play in the match as well but cannot play due to the lack of an eyeshield, but Suzuna manages to find an eyeshield so Sena saves the match when he enters the game. But Shin wants to see Sena's devil-like Ghost Run instead of it being sealed.
46	"The Ghost vs. The Spear!"; Transliteration: "Gōsuto vs Supia" (Japanese: ゴーストvsスピア)	February 22, 2006	
Now substituting in a corporation league game, Sena and Shin finally get the rematch they've been waiting so long for. However, Shin is disappointed as Sena refuses to use the Devil Bat Ghost due to his previous orders from Hiruma. The Samurais are losing due to Ootawara and Shin's entrance into the game, and the line cannot withstand Ootawara. The Huh-Huh brothers arrive and see Sena, Monta, and Komusubi playing, so they too join the game. Shin tells Sena that since he finally got the chance to face him, he will not hold back, and that Sena should not either. With the encouragement of Monta, Komusubi, and the Ha-Ha brothers, Sena decides to use the Devil Bat Ghost.
47	"Hot! Guts! Fire!"; Transliteration: "Atsuize! Gattsu!!" (Japanese: 熱いぜ!ガッツ!!)	March 1, 2006	
The Devil Bats witness the physical endurance and team bond of the Yuhi Guts, their next opponents in the tournament. Hiruma says that objectively, the Devil Bats have a 99% chance of winning, but the Yuhi Guts have a 1% chance of defeating them due to having three years' more experience. The Devil Bats then go to watch Ojo's game against the Sankaku Punks.
48	"A Battle of Effort, Fortitude, and Will!"; Transliteration: "Doryoku! Gensei! Zenryoku Shōbu!" (Japanese: 努力!根性!全力勝負!)	March 8, 2006	
Deimon's game against the Guts begins. Hiruma tries to put pressure on them with words about this being their last chance to go to the Christmas Bowl. However, the Guts' coach has replaced the regular players with athletes from other clubs in order to win, and the regulars are not allowed to play. The Guts intercept the ball near the beginning of the game and score a touchdown and get the extra point, but after seeing them play, Hiruma lowers the Guts' previous 1% chance of winning to 0%.
49	"The Refined Spirit of a Lineman!"; Transliteration: "Ibushi Gin·Rain Tamashī" (Japanese: いぶし銀·ライン魂!)	March 15, 2006	
The Devil Bats meet the captain of the Hashiratani Deers, Yamamoto Onihei. The Devil Bats go watch the Deers game against the Kyoshin Poseidon, in order to see the team that might become their future opponents. However, they are all disappointed to see the veteran Hashitarani Deers lose to the Kyoshin Poseidons.
50	"The Courage to Stand Firm!"; Transliteration: "Nigenai Yūki!" (Japanese: 逃げない勇気!)	March 22, 2006	
Sena learns the truth about the "real" Eyeshield 21 from a Poseidon player, Kakei Shun. Discouraged after hearing that he may never catch up to the real Eyeshield 21, Sena learns from Shin that it is not size that matters but an unwavering spirit.
51	"Danger! The Lethal Chameleon"; Transliteration: "Ayaushi! Saikyō no Kamereon" (Japanese: 危うし!最凶のカメレオン)	March 29, 2006	
Eyeshield 21 enters the Chameleons' locker room and cuts up all their uniforms in the middle of the night. Sena said he did not do it. The Chameleons enter Deimon and try to find Eyeshield 21. They find out the Scorpions were impersonating Eyeshield.
52	"Clash! Chameleon vs Poseidon"; Transliteration: "Gekitotsu! Kamereon vs Poseidon" (Japanese: 激突!カメレオンvsポセイドン)	April 5, 2006	
Chamelon and Poseidon start their game. Poseidon has a great advantage because they have tall players. On the other hand, the Chameleons are not united. Habashira's team gave up halfway through. Habashira tries to encourage them and force his team to win, but fails. In the end, Rui confronts Hiruma and cries out through his tears, "What exactly is the difference between you and me?!"
53	"Fear of the Poisonous Scorpion!"; Transliteration: "Kyōfu no DOku Sasori!" (Japanese: 恐怖の毒サソリ!)	April 12, 2006	
The scorpion is playing really dirty. They are also predicting the Devil Bats' every move. Hiruma disappears during the game. Kurita must stay strong to win against those cowards.
54	"The Control Tower which Disappeared"; Transliteration: "Kieta Shireitō" (Japanese: 消えた司令塔)	April 19, 2006	
At the end of the first quarter Mamori opens the game plan Hiruma gave her, which shows that Hiruma predicted every single thing that happened in the first quarter. At last Hiruma appears. The Devil Bats win the game with the help of Hiruma's Devil plans. Hiruma confirms his new slave after the game.
55	"Wall of the Physique Difference"; Transliteration: "Taigakusa no Kabe" (Japanese: 体格差の壁)	April 26, 2006	
After being told by Mizumachi from the Poseidons that he is no good at football, Komosubi runs away from him. He thinks that because he is short, he is useless to the Devil Bats. Everyone goes looking for him and they convince him to return home.
56	"Our Small Contract!"; Transliteration: "Ucchare Kokekkan!" (Japanese: うっちゃれ小結関!)	May 3, 2006	
Komusubi starts learning sumo. With his special training, he finds a way to overcome the physical difference between himself and Mizumachi and Kakei.
57	"The Man Who Knows 21"; Transliteration: ""21" o Shirumono" (Japanese: 「21」を知る者)	May 10, 2006	
When Monta and Sena are sent to spy on the Poseidons' final practice before the game, they are caught, and Kakei tells Sena that he wants to challenge Eyeshield 21 from the Devil Bats and prove to him that he will never match up to the "real" Eyeshield 21. Sena gets past him using the Devil Bat Ghost, but Hiruma, who had been watching, tells Sena that it was not Kakei's true strength he was running against.
58	"Devil vs Sea God"; Transliteration: "Akuma vs Umi no Kami" (Japanese: 悪魔vs海の神)	May 17, 2006	
The game against the Kyoshin Poseidons is about to begin. Kakei tells Sena that he will prove once and for all that he's not qualified to bear the name "Eyeshield 21." Hiruma then states that the taller team will not win, but the team that wins will be the team that is better at American Football.
59	"Back Ace Man"; Transliteration: "Ura Ēsu no Otoko" (Japanese: 裏エースの男)	May 24, 2006	
The hidden ace of the Deimon Devil bats appears, being the crucial key to their new formation: Wishbone.
60	"Promise on the Field!"; Transliteration: "Fīrudo no yakusoku!" (Japanese: フィールドの約束!)	May 31, 2006	
The Devil Bats have made a comeback, the score is 14-12, and Deimon has the ball. Kakei finds a way to exploit the weakness of the wishbone formation. However, Hiruma finds another way to overcome their new plan, and they score another touchdown, putting the Devil Bats in the lead.
61	"Determination to Win!"; Transliteration: "Shōri e no Shūnen!" (Japanese: 勝利への執念!)	June 7, 2006	
The game continues with a stalemate with both teams trying to break the trend and score, knowing that this will lean the game highly in their favor.
62	"Terror! Moby Dick Anchor"; Transliteration: "Senritsu! Mobyi Dikku Ankā" (Japanese: 戦慄!モビィディック·アンカー)	June 14, 2006	
The Poseidons reveal a new formation called High Wave. Hiruma immediately spots its weakness, but Sena cannot get past Kakei. The ball is turned over to Kyoshin, and they score a touchdown, giving them a five-point lead. They try to get an extra two points, but due to Hiruma's plan, the ball is intercepted by Monta. With 1 minute left in the game, Deimon's only hope is for Sena to get past Kakei.
63	"Offense and Defence 30 cm!!" Transliteration: "30 Senchi no Kōhō!!" (Japanese: 30 センチの攻防!!)	June 21, 2006	
Sena breaks through Kakei's Moby Dick Anchor, but he is stopped just inches from the touchdown by a desperate Mizumachi. Hiruma uses their last timeout with two seconds remaining and the Devil Bats behind by five points. They decide to have Sena jump over their line in a joint combination with Monta so that he goes twice as high. The plan succeeds, and they score a touchdown, winning the game. Kakei tells Sena that it no longer matters whether he is the original Eyeshield 21 or not, but that what matters is that he is one of the most excellent players Kakei has ever seen, and that Sena is Eyeshield 21.
64	"The Man Possessing Speed of Light Appears!?"; Transliteration: "Kōsoku no Otoko Arawaru!?" (Japanese: 光速の男現る!?)	June 28, 2006	
Riku appears and talks about his past and how Sena could run because of him. Riku asks Sena who he thinks is the best player. His answer? Shin. He then asks why and Sena says because "his power and speed are incredible." Riku is part of Seibu who missed the game before due to his pride. Seibu beats the Fishermen 49-0.
65	"Deimon High School Sports Meet!!"; Transliteration: "Deimon Kōkō Taiiku Matsuri dā!!" (Japanese: 泥門高校体育祭だァ!!)	July 5, 2006	
The whole Deimon team goes to a sports meeting where the team is divided into two teams, Mamori san, Hiruma, and Yukimitsu (the smart team) vs everyone else on the football team (the brawn team). They play tug-o-war and other sports. The "brawn team" finally finds out that Hiruma has plotted all the sports games to teach the team how to do the "bump" in his evil plotting ways by handcuffing everyone's hands (a trick first used by the Taiyo Sphinxes team).
66	"Sprinter Sena!?"; Transliteration: "Supurintā Sena!?" (Japanese: スプリンター·セナ!?)	July 12, 2006	
Ishimaru misses practice because another member of his athletic club injures his knee at a practice and he cannot run for three weeks. Sena offers to send Eyeshield 21 to run in his place but figuring Hiruma will not let him, goes as himself. Sena helps the athletic club reach the finals, where they win first place.
67	"Promise of the Three"; Transliteration: "Sannin no Yakusoku" (Japanese: 三人の約束)	July 19, 2006	
Riku learns that Sena's speed has increased, and also that he is secretly Eyeshield 21. Hiruma confronts Kid and tells him that between Riku and Eyeshield 21, Eyeshield is the fastest running back. He asks who Kid thinks is the strongest quarterback in Kanto. His answer: Yoichi Hiruma.
68	"Fastest Proof"; Transliteration: "Saizoku no Shōmei" (Japanese: 最速の証明)	July 26, 2006	
The game against the Wild Gunmen begins. Doburoku tells the Devil Bats that if they lose concentration for even a second, they will surely lose. Deimon kicks off the ball first and it is received by Riku. He shows the power of his technique, the Rodeo Drive, by running straight to a touchdown. However, when Seibu kicks off to Deimon, Sena returns the favor by doing the same, running a straight touchdown, being stopped by Riku just a second too late.
69	"Field of Desperation"; Transliteration: "Zetsubō no Fīrudo" (Japanese: 絶望のフィールド)	August 9, 2006	
Unable to stop Kid's Quick and Fire technique, the Devil Bats decide to reveal the fruit of their bump training. Seibu counters by bringing in the Iron Horse, Tetsuma. Monta is unable to stop him, and he scores a touchdown, with the extra point successful, making the score 14-6. Hiruma tries to trick Kid into a quick pass by using a Zone Blitz, but he fails and Kid rushes to a touchdown.
70	"Musashi is here" Transliteration: "Musashi wa Koko ni iru" (Japanese: ムサシはここにいる)	August 16, 2006	
The Devil Bats are in desperate need of a kicker, and Musashi is watching the game from his father's hospital room. Without a score before halftime, the Devil Bats have a slim chance of victory, so Hiruma decides to kick the field goal himself. The kick is close, but it hits the side pole and is no good. Using a strategy that relies on nothing more than Kurita's brute force, the Devil Bats get a touchdown, lessening the point gap.
71	"The Devil's Counterattack"; Transliteration: "Hangeki no Akuma" (Japanese: 反撃の悪魔)	August 23, 2006	
Trying to prove to Sena that he is the better player, Riku fumbles the ball. Sena intercepts it and runs straight to a touchdown. With Deimon only down by 2, Seibu gives the ball to Riku. Sena tries to stop him, but Riku gets by him easily, scoring another touchdown for Seibu.
72	"Pride of Speed of Light"; Transliteration: "Kōsoku no Puraido" (Japanese: 光速のプライド)	August 30, 2006	
There are 9 minutes left in the game, and Deimon is behind by 9. They try to make up the difference, but Sena cannot get past Riku. With only 1 minute left, Sena finally gets past Riku's Rodeo Drive and scores a touchdown. Deimon is only behind by 3 points.
