= Everyone's Darling Has a Secret =

Japanese manga series and its adaptation(s)

- First tankōbon volume cover, featuring Rei Kuromiya

放課後のアイドルには秘密がある (Hōkago no Aidoru ni wa Himitsu ga Aru)
- Genre: Romantic comedy
- Manga
- Written by: Kashiko Amane
- Published by: Hakusensha
- English publisher: NA: Yen Press
- Imprint: Young Animal Comics
- Magazine: Manga Park; Young Animal Web
- Original run: September 18, 2022 – present
- Volumes: 10
- Anime television series
- Directed by: Hikaru Sato
- Written by: Fumihiko Shimo
- Music by: Satoru Kōsaki; Monaca
- Studio: Gekkou
- Licensed by: Crunchyroll
- Original run: April 2027 – scheduled
- icon

Everyone's Darling Has a Secret (Japanese: 放課後のアイドルには秘密がある, Hepburn: Hōkago no Aidoru ni wa Himitsu ga Aru; lit. 'Idol Have a Secret After School') is a Japanese manga series written and illustrated by Kashiko Amane. It originally began a preview serialization in Hakusensha's Young Animal magazine in July 2022, before beginning serialization in Hakusensha's Manga Park and Young Animal Web services in September 2022. The series has been compiled into ten volumes as of October 2026. An anime television series adaptation produced by Gekkou is set to premiere in April 2027.

== Plot ==
Hizashi Hiruno, a first-year high school student, is surprised to learn that he has failed his academic proficiency exam, the result of a careless mistake. He ends up taking remedial classes with Rei Kuromiya, his beautiful and popular classmate who is also a popular idol. Rei feels her own pressures due to promising her mother that she would quit being an idol if she failed at her studies. With the two both unexpectedly getting low scores, the two decide to help each other in their studies, hoping to meet their respective expectations. The two fall for each other as Hizashi realizes that there is more to Rei than her public image.

== Characters ==
Hizashi Hiruno (昼野 ひざし, Hiruno Hizashi)
Voiced by: Reiji Kawashima
A first-year student at Houtei Academy, a prestigious escalator school. Due to family pressures, he aims to have high grades. However, due to a careless mistake in his academic proficiency exam, he fails that and is forced to take remedial classes. He starts taking the classes with Rei Kuromiya, where she asks him to teach her. He eventually realizes that he has feelings for Rei.
Rei Kuromiya (黒宮 玲, Kuromiya Rei)
Voiced by: Hikaru Tono
Hizashi's classmate, she is the center of the popular idol group Indigo Impulse. She has a public reputation for being a genius idol, being able to balance both her studies and entertainment career. However, her studies have suffered due to her idol work, leading her to also fail the proficiency exam. She asks Hizashi to help her study, knowing that she will be forced to quit her entertainment activities if her grades keep failing. As time goes on, she develops a deep crush for Hizashi.
Sakura Akai (赤井 さくら, Akai Sakura)
Voiced by: Iori Noguchi (=Love)
A member of Indigo Impulse.
Sora Konno (紺野 そら, Konno Sora)
Voiced by: Ami Maeshima (≒Joy)
A member of Indigo Impulse.
Hōfu (防府市, Bōfushi)
Voiced by: Aimi Ozawa (≒Joy)
Saitō (斎藤)
Voiced by: Renon Esumi (≒Joy)
Okaba (オカバ)
Voiced by: Aoi Ōnishi (≒Joy)

== Development ==
Kashiko Amane originally began developing the manga during the COVID-19 pandemic in Japan, when she was working on a fan fiction work about the character Rin Shibuya from The Idolmaster. Her editor suggested that she work on a story about someone being in a romantic relationship with Rin, which Amane eventually developed into an original series. The series was also inspired by her fantasies about sharing a class with an idol, while noting that she found it unrealistic that a normal person could ever be in contact with a celebrity. Her career as a manga artist was inspired by an idea by game director Masahiro Sakurai about keeping her goals secret from and "raising her internal pressure" to allow her to focus on actually doing things rather than being distracted by external pressures.

== Media ==
=== Manga ===
Written and illustrated by Kashiko Amane, the series initially had a preview serialization in Hakusensha's Young Animal magazine from July 8 to August 12, 2022. The series began serialization in Hakusensha's Manga Park and Young Animal Web services on September 18, 2022. The first tankōbon volume was released on February 28, 2023; ten volumes have been released as of October 29, 2026. The series is licensed in English by Yen Press, which released its first English volume on January 21, 2025.

No.	Original release date	Original ISBN	English release date	English ISBN
1	February 28, 2023	978-4-592-16267-4	January 21, 2025	979-8-8554-0473-9
2	June 29, 2023	978-4-592-16268-1	May 27, 2025	979-8-8554-0475-3
3	October 27, 2023	978-4-592-16269-8	November 25, 2025	979-8-8554-0477-7
4	April 26, 2024	978-4-592-16270-4	June 9, 2026	979-8-8554-2333-4
5	September 27, 2024	978-4-592-16350-3	—	—
6	February 28, 2025	978-4-592-16360-2	—	—
7	June 27, 2025	978-4-592-16450-0	—	—
8	January 29, 2026	978-4-592-16529-3	—	—
9	July 29, 2026	978-4-592-16700-6	—	—
10	October 29, 2026	978-4-592-16725-9	—	—

=== Anime ===
An anime television series adaptation was announced on September 28, 2026. It will be produced by Gekkou and directed by Hikaru Sato, with series composition and screenplays handled by Fumihiko Shimo, characters designed by Kibidango 14-gō, and music composed by Satoru Kōsaki and Monaca. The series is set to premiere in April 2027. The ending theme song is "Naritai Watashi" (なりたい私; lit. 'The Me I Want To Become'), performed by an in-story idol group, Indigo Impulse. Crunchyroll will stream the series.
