= Grandpa and Grandma Turn Young Again =

Japanese manga series

- Cover of the first volume featuring, Ine (left) and Shozō Saito (right)

じいさんばあさん若返る (Jīsan Bāsan Wakagaeru)
- Genre: Romantic comedy
- Manga
- Written by: Kagiri Araido
- Published by: Media Factory
- Imprint: MF Comics
- Magazine: Monthly Comic Alunna; (July 13, 2022 – June 15, 2024)
- Original run: October 26, 2019 – present
- Volumes: 9
- Anime television series
- Directed by: Masayoshi Nishida
- Written by: Yukie Sugawara
- Music by: Tomoki Hasegawa
- Studio: Gekkou
- Licensed by: Crunchyroll (streaming); SEA: Plus Media Networks Asia
- Original network: AT-X, Tokyo MX, KBS Kyoto, SUN, BS11, RAB
- Original run: April 7, 2024 – June 16, 2024
- Episodes: 11
- icon

Grandpa and Grandma Turn Young Again (Japanese: じいさんばあさん若返る, Hepburn: Jīsan Bāsan Wakagaeru) is a Japanese manga series written and illustrated by Kagiri Araido. It began serialization on the author's Twitter and Pixiv accounts in October 2019 and ended in June 2024. The series resumed serialization on the author's Twitter and Pixiv in July 2025. It later received parallel serialization on Media Factory's Monthly Comic Alunna magazine in July 2022. An anime television series adaptation produced by Gekkou aired from April to June 2024.

== Plot ==
The story follows the elderly couple Shozo Saito and Ine Saito, who live in Hirosaki, Aomori Prefecture. One day, while checking their apple farm, they notice a golden apple growing in one of the trees. After eating that apple, the two found themselves physically restored to their 20s.

== Characters ==
Shozo Saito (斎藤 正蔵, Saitō Shōzō)
Voiced by: Shin-ichiro Miki (voice comic, anime)
Husband of Ine. He has lived a fulfilling life with his wife Ine, but finds himself disappointed that he couldn't treat her more extravagantly. A dream suddenly becomes a reality when he finds himself turning young again.
Ine Saito (斎藤 イネ, Saitō Ine)
Voiced by: Mamiko Noto (voice comic, anime)
Wife of Shozo. She is happy with her life with her husband, though wishes she could spend more time with him since she had gotten sick in the past, causing them to miss out on going on trips and a honeymoon. Like her husband, she finds herself suddenly turning younger one day.
Mino Saito (斎藤 未乃, Saitō Mino)
Voiced by: Shiori Mikami
Shozo and Ine's granddaughter.
Shiori Saito (斎藤 詩織, Saitō Shiori)
Voiced by: Nao Tōyama
Shozo and Ine's other granddaughter, and Mino's cousin.
Shōta Igarashi (五十嵐 将太, Igarashi Shōta)
Voiced by: Junta Terashima
Mino's classmate who has a crush on her. He later marries her and becomes her husband after her grandparents' passing at the end of the series.
Yoshiaki Saito (斎藤 義明, Saitō Yoshiaki)
Voiced by: Kazuyuki Okitsu
Shozo and Ine's son, Kaede's husband and Mino's father. He has a more serious demeanor compared to his joyful father.
Kaede Saito (斎藤 楓, Saitō Kaede)
Voiced by: Tomo Sakurai
Shozo and Ine's daughter-in-law and Mino's mother.
Satoshi Takahashi (高橋 聡, Takahashi Satoshi)
Voiced by: Shōhei Kajikawa
A senior classmate of Shiori, who's also studying to get into the medical department. He later marries Shiori and becomes her husband after her grandparents' passing at the end of the series.
Hajime Takahashi (高橋 一, Takahashi Hajime)
Voiced by: Nobuyuki Hiyama
Satoshi's grandfather. He and his wife also mysteriously turned young much like Shozo and Ine.
Setsu Takahashi (高橋 セツ, Takahashi Setsu)
Voiced by: Yū Kobayashi
Satoshi's grandmother. She and her husband also mysteriously turned young much like Shozo and Ine.

== Media ==
=== Manga ===
Written and illustrated by Kagiri Araido, Grandpa and Grandma Turn Young Again began serialization on Araido's Twitter and Pixiv accounts on October 26, 2019, and ended on June 15, 2024. It later began parallel serialization on Media Factory's Monthly Comic Alunna magazine on July 13, 2022. Araido resumed serialization of the series on Twitter and Pixiv on July 4, 2025, with the new chapters occurring "around volumes 4 and 5."

Media Factory compiled the series' chapters into tankōbon volumes. Eight volumes were released from June 22, 2020, to June 21, 2024. A ninth volume was released on March 17, 2026.

No.	Japanese release date	Japanese ISBN
1	June 22, 2020	978-4-04-064532-2
2	November 21, 2020	978-4-04-065981-7
3	April 23, 2021	978-4-04-680353-5
4	October 22, 2021	978-4-04-680727-4
5	April 22, 2022	978-4-04-681336-7
6	October 21, 2022	978-4-04-681799-0
7	August 16, 2023	978-4-04-682378-6
8	June 21, 2024	978-4-04-683683-0
9	March 17, 2026	978-4-04-685733-0

=== Anime ===
An anime television series adaptation was announced on August 9, 2023. It is produced by Gekkou and directed by Masayoshi Nishida, with Yukie Sugawara handling series composition, Nagisa Takahashi designing the characters, and Tomoki Hasegawa composing the music. The series aired from April 7 to June 16, 2024, on AT-X and other networks. The opening theme song is "Kimi ga Ojīchan Atashi ga Obāchan" (君がおじいちゃんあたしがおばあちゃん; "You are Grandpa, I am Grandma"), performed by Koresawa, while the ending theme song is "Soitoge Yo-Yo!!" (添い遂げYO-YO!!; "Married for Life Yo-Yo!!"), performed by Shin-ichiro Miki and Mamiko Noto. Crunchyroll streamed the series. Plus Media Networks Asia licensed the series in Southeast Asia.

==== Episodes ====
No.	Title (Note: All English titles are taken from Crunchyroll.)	Directed by (Note: Information is taken from the ending credits of each episode.)	Written by	Storyboarded by	Original release date
1	"Grandpa and Grandma and the Sports Festival"; Transliteration: "Jīsan Bāsan to Undōkai" (Japanese: じいさんばあさんと運動会)	Masayoshi Nishida	Yukie Sugawara	Masayoshi Nishida	April 7, 2024
2	"Grandpa and Grandma and Their Children"; Transliteration: "Jīsan Bāsan to Kodomo-tachi" (Japanese: じいさんばあさんと子供たち)	Masayoshi Nishida	Yukie Sugawara	Masayoshi Nishida	April 14, 2024
3	"Grandpa Turns Old Again"; Transliteration: "Jīsan, Jīsan ni Modoru" (Japanese: じいさん、じいさんに戻る)	Shigenori Awai, Kimo Ousei	Yukie Sugahara	Masayoshi Nishida	April 21, 2024
4	"Grandpa and Grandma and the Cultural Festival"; Transliteration: "Jīsan Bāsan to Bunkasai" (Japanese: じいさんばあさんと文化祭)	Hiromichi Matano	Yukie Sugawara	Hiromichi Matano	April 28, 2024
5	"Grandma's Memory Turns Young Again"; Transliteration: "Bāsan, Kioku ga Wakagaeru" (Japanese: ばあさん、記憶が若返る)	Genkai Kana	Yukie Sugawara	Masayoshi Nishida	May 5, 2024
6	"Grandpa and Grandma on Their Honeymoon: Tokyo Arc"; Transliteration: "Jīsan Bāsan no Shinkonryokō Tōkyō-hen" (Japanese: じいさんばあさんの新婚旅行 東京編)	Masayoshi Nishida	Yukie Sugawara	Masayoshi Nishida	May 12, 2024
7	"Grandpa and Grandma on Their Honeymoon: Atami Arc"; Transliteration: "Jīsan Bāsan no Shinkonryokō Atami-hen" (Japanese: じいさんばあさんの新婚旅行 熱海編)	Kiyotaka Takezawa	Yukie Sugawara	Masayoshi Nishida	May 19, 2024
8	"A New Grandpa and Grandma Appear"; Transliteration: "Aratana Jīsan Bāsan Arawareru" (Japanese: 新たなじいさんばあさん現れる)	Shigeru Yamazaki	Yukie Sugawara	Shigeru Yamazaki	May 26, 2024
9	"Grandpa and Grandma and a Summer Festival"; Transliteration: "Jīsan Bāsan to Natsu Matsuri" (Japanese: じいさんばあさんと夏祭り)	Shigenori Awai	Yukie Sugawara	Masayoshi Nishida	June 2, 2024
10	"Grandpa and Grandma's Daily Life"; Transliteration: "Jīsan Bāsan to Nichijō" (Japanese: じいさんばあさんと日常)	Keiaki Takagi	Yukie Sugawara	Keiaki Takagi	June 9, 2024
11	"Grandpa, Grandma and Winter Festival"; Transliteration: "Jīsan Bāsan to Fuyu Yasumi" (Japanese: じいさんばあさんと冬休み)	Masayoshi Nishida	Yukie Sugawara	Masayoshi Nishida	June 16, 2024

== Reception ==
In 2020, the manga was ranked sixth in the Next Manga Awards in the web category.

The series has 1 million copies in circulation as of October 21, 2022.
