= TenPuru =

Japanese manga series

- TenPuru: No One Can Live on Loneliness
- First tankōbon volume cover

てんぷる (Tenpuru)
- Genre: Harem; Romantic comedy
- Manga
- Written by: Kimitake Yoshioka
- Published by: Kodansha
- English publisher: NA: Kodansha USA (digital)
- Imprint: Afternoon KC
- Magazine: Comic Days
- Original run: September 1, 2018 – present
- Volumes: 16
- Anime television series
- Directed by: Kazuomi Koga
- Produced by: Fumihiro Ozawa; Nobuhiko Kurosu; Takahiro Fujii; Akira Yonezawa
- Written by: Yōhei Kashii
- Music by: Shuntaro Innami
- Studio: Gekkou
- Licensed by: Crunchyroll; SA / SEA: Medialink
- Original network: Tokyo MX, BS11, MBS, AT-X, BS NTV
- Original run: July 9, 2023 – September 24, 2023
- Episodes: 12 + 2 OVAs
- icon

TenPuru: No One Can Live on Loneliness (Japanese: てんぷる, Hepburn: Tenpuru; lit. 'Temple') is a Japanese manga series written and illustrated by Kimitake Yoshioka. It has been serialized in Kodansha's online platform Comic Days since September 2018. A 12-episode anime television series adaptation produced by Gekkou aired from July to September 2023.

== Plot ==
Akemitsu Akagami is abandoned by his womanizing father and distances himself from women, fearing he inherited his father's perverted nature. When he falls in love at first sight with Yuzuki Aoba, he goes to Minazuki Temple to become a monk and purge his desires, only to find her there. He learns the temple is actually a nunnery and his father owes it ¥20 million. He works at the temple to pay the debt off while trying to avoid being tempted by the various gorgeous girls that live there, but he usually gives into his desires and wants to be with all of them.

== Characters ==
Akemitsu Akagami (赤神 明光, Akagami Akemitsu)
Voiced by: Masayuki Akasaka (Japanese); Bradley Gareth, Monica Rial (young) (English)
Deciding he is cursed with his womanizing father’s perversion after many attempts to disassociate himself with him, he enrolls as a monk and joins the male-only Mikazuki Temple, only to find a girl, one of its many female residents, in it. He also becomes the all-around worker for the temple given that his father also has a huge debt with them.
Yuzuki Aoba (蒼葉 結月, Aoba Yuzuki)
Voiced by: Aimi (Japanese); Kelly Greenshield (English)
A seventeen year-old girl who aims to become the next head priest of the Mikazuki Temple. Akemitsu fell in love with her the moment he saw her on the street. She is the person whom he first met at the supposedly all-male temple. She is the eldest of the three Aoba sisters, and is determined to become its head priestess, or else the temple will be disbanded. She is engaged to the head of their main temple, who gave her the ultimatum. She is clumsy and she often gets into ecchi situations with Akemitsu, including her clothes getting undone.
Tsukuyo Aoba (蒼葉 月夜, Aoba Tsukuyo)
Voiced by: Yu Serizawa (Japanese); Molly Zhang (English)
Yuzuki's younger sister. She is also doing archery at her high school.
Kurage Aoba (蒼葉 海月, Aoba Kurage)
Voiced by: Nanami Yamashita (Japanese); Morgan Lea (English)
The youngest of the Aoba sisters, but has more insight. She repeatedly attempted to ask Akemitsu to marry her, though he constantly turned her down, not being interested in her. She is in her third year of junior high school. She has a complex about her body, as it is not as developed as her sisters'.
Mia Christoph (ミア・クリストフ, Mia Kurisutofu)
Voiced by: Madoka Asahina (Japanese); Marianne Bray (English)
A foreign girl who escaped her family for the same reasons as Akemitsu. She is accompanied by her only friend Kagura. She is not aware who her real father is.
Kagura Baldwin (カグラ・ボールドウィン, Kagura Bōrudowin)
Voiced by: Sumire Uesaka (Japanese); Celeste Perez (English)
Mia's best friend who followed her to Japan. Despite aiding Mia in her attempts, Kagura, her family being a subordinate to Mia's family, is secretly working behind the scenes to make her a sex queen, as befitting the Christoph family name; and one of those tasks is to seduce Akemitsu and get rid of him.
Kiki (嬉々)
Voiced by: Chiaki Takahashi (Japanese); Monét Lerner (English)
Momentary caretaker of the Mikazuki temple, and is training Akemitsu, Yuzuki, and Mia to become priests.
Nyagosuke (にゃごすけ)
Voiced by: Chika Anzai (Japanese); Monica Rial (English)
Kurage's pet cat.
Tsukina Aoba (蒼葉 月那, Aoba Tsukina)
Voiced by: Kana Asumi (Japanese); Natalie Van Sistine (English)
She is the head priestess of the Ryukoku-Ji Temple and the mother of Yuzuki Aoba, Tsukuyo Aoba and Kurage Aoba.

== Media ==
=== Manga ===
Written and illustrated by Kimitake Yoshioka, TenPuru started in Kodansha's online platform Comic Days on September 1, 2018. Kodansha has collected its chapters into individual tankōbon volumes. The first volume was released on July 5, 2019. As of October 7, 2026, sixteen volumes have been released.

In June 2020, it was announced that BookWalker Global partnered with Kodansha USA to release the manga in English language, and the first two volumes were released digitally on July 14, 2020.

==== Volumes ====
No.	Original release date	Original ISBN	English release date	English ISBN
1	July 5, 2019	978-4-06-516239-2	July 14, 2020	978-1-64-659666-9
2	November 22, 2019	978-4-06-517559-0	July 14, 2020	978-1-64-659673-7
3	May 22, 2020	978-4-06-519481-2	January 19, 2021	978-1-64-659674-4
4	November 20, 2020	978-4-06-521420-6	March 16, 2021	978-1-63-699008-8
5	May 21, 2021	978-4-06-523120-3	October 19, 2021	978-1-63-699419-2
6	November 17, 2021	978-4-06-525914-6	May 31, 2022	978-1-68-491191-2
7	August 5, 2022	978-4-06-528769-9	January 10, 2023	978-1-68-491639-9
8	January 23, 2023	978-4-06-530170-8	June 20, 2023	978-1-68-491972-7
9	June 22, 2023	978-4-06-531772-3	December 19, 2023	979-8-88-933295-4
10	October 5, 2023	978-4-06-533099-9	May 14, 2024	979-8-88-933491-0
11	April 5, 2024	978-4-06-535018-8	October 29, 2024	979-8-89-478107-5
12	October 7, 2024	978-4-06-537095-7	July 15, 2025	979-8-89-478587-5
13	April 7, 2025	978-4-06-539154-9	December 16, 2025	979-8-89-478806-7
14	October 7, 2025	978-4-06-541047-9	April 7, 2026	979-8-89-830066-1
15	April 7, 2026	978-4-06-543069-9	August 11, 2026	979-8-89-830206-1
16	October 7, 2026	978-4-06-544985-1	—	—

=== Anime ===
An anime television series adaptation was announced in January 2023. It is produced by Gekkou and directed by Kazuomi Koga, with scripts supervised by Yōhei Kashii, character designs handled by Masato Katsumata, and music composed by Shuntaro Innami. The series aired from July 9 to September 24, 2023, on Tokyo MX and other networks. The opening theme song is "Bonnō Paradise" (煩悩☆パラダイス) performed by Aimi, while the ending theme song is "Oidemase! Mikadzuki Tera" (おいでませ! 三日月寺) performed by Aimi, Yu Serizawa, Nanami Yamashita, Madoka Asahina, and Sumire Uesaka as their respective characters.

Crunchyroll streamed the series outside of Asia. Medialink licensed the series in Asia-Pacific, streaming it on its Ani-One Asia YouTube channel.

==== Episodes ====
No.	Title	Directed by	Written by	Storyboarded by	Original release date
1	"You'll Repay Us With Your Body!"; Transliteration: "Karada de Haratte Morau Koto ni Shimashita!" (Japanese: カラダで払ってもらうことにしました!)	Kazuomi Koga	Yōhei Kashii	Kazuomi Koga	July 9, 2023
Akemitsu is abandoned by his womanising father. Years later Akemitsu studies to be a civil servant and, refusing to be anything like his father, refuses to date. One day he meets a cute girl named Yuzuki and falls in love. This sends him mad as his repressed lechery emerges. Deciding he is cursed with his father’s perversion he enrolls as a monk and joins the male-only Mikazuki Temple. Alas, the first person he meets there is Yuzuki, half dressed, causing him to desperately propose marriage before trying to escape and falling down a well. Yuzuki is actually there for an arranged marriage meeting with another man, confusing her. Akemitsu reappears concussed from his fall, making her think he is a lecherous ghost as he staggers around terrifying the women who live there. After he is captured it transpires the temple is now a nunnery for priestesses. Akemitsu leaves but Yuzuki, feeling sorry for him, convinces him to stay overnight to get the morning bus. Unfortunately, after realising his family name is Akegami, it transpires his father owes the temple ¥20 million. Akemitsu is horrified to learn he must now live at the temple as a dogsbody until the debt is paid.
2	"Being Pervy Isn't a Bad Thing"; Transliteration: "Etchi Nanotte Warui Koto ja Nai yo?" (Japanese: えっちなのって悪いことじゃないよ?)	Tomonori Mine	Chabō Higurashi	Takaaki Ishiyama	July 16, 2023
Seeing the disrepair of the temple due to the missing money Akemitsu swears to fix everything. Yuzuki is convinced of his pure heart but the others decide to expose him so Yuzuki will kick him out. Tsukuyo is chosen to distract him with her body so he messes up his chores, yet despite repressing his lechery he completes chores perfectly. Tsukuyo opts for seduction and ambushes him in the bath, but she panics at his nudity and an accidental fall ends in them actually kissing, witnessed by Yuzuki who asks Akemitsu to leave. Everyone celebrates but Yuzuki starts avoiding Tsukuyo, though this turns out to be embarrassment as Yuzuki cannot stop lecherously thinking about Akemitsu’s nude body. Tsukuyo realises she may have misjudged him. Akemitsu resigns himself to homelessness until Yuzuki tracks him down, explaining she only meant to order him to leave the bathroom, not the temple. Tsukuyo apologises to him, but adds 5million to his debt for stealing her first kiss. Mia is furious Akemitsu returned again. Kurage gives him advice that lechery exists in all humans; even Buddha had children, so possibly even Yuzuki is a little lecherous. For fun she tricks him into opening the bathroom door on a naked Tsukuyo, who beats him up. Unable to stand the depravity he brought into their temple Mia confronts Akemitsu.
3	"I'll Castrate You"; Transliteration: "Kyosei Shite Morau wa" (Japanese: 去勢してもらうわ)	Mitsutaka Noshitani	Yōhei Kashii	Eiji Suganuma	July 23, 2023
Mia challenges Akemitsu to a duel with castration as the penalty for losing. It transpires Mia is a foreign student and Kagura her mischievous attendant who causes Mia’s breasts to fall into Akemitsu’s hands during the duel. Mia passes out from embarrassment and faces a penalty from Kagura’s book of lewd penances. Akemitsu decides her penance is to lend him the book to help him repress his lechery. Mia mistakenly thinks he wants sex and enters his room prepared to have sex with him, only to be humiliated to learn he wanted the book. Kagura traps them in a store room where Mia blurts out a warning to stay away in case he arouses her. This leads to a confession that her family have their own curse of lechery, so she came to the all-female temple to repress it, only for Akemitsu to show up as a temptation. Realising they are alike they agree to support each other in rejecting lust through the penances in Kagura’s book. Yuzuki forgets about her rescheduled marriage meeting, on which the temple is relying to stay open, so Akemitsu rushes to get her there on time but they end up trapped in the back of a truck. Still determined to make it Yuzuki decides to use the temporary privacy to change into her yukata, which requires two people.
4	"Go Ahead and Take a Shower"; Transliteration: "Saki ni Shawā Abite Oideyo" (Japanese: 先にシャワー浴びておいでよ)	Kazuomi Koga	Yōhei Kashii	Kazuomi Koga	July 30, 2023
They finally make it to Ryukoku temple and meet the potential fiancé, Kijo. Akemitsu is mistaken for a monk by a priestess and ends up attending as official matchmaker. Kijo is a genuinely nice man; making Yuzuki feel guilty so she confesses her goal was to trick Kijo into becoming her fiancé and head priest, then break off the engagement once she qualified to replace him as head priestess. Kijo is sympathetic but concludes Mikazuki temple should close. Akemitsu resorts to begging on Yuzuki’s behalf. Yuzuki panics as it sounds like a marriage proposal. Kijo agrees to a fake three year engagement so the temple stays open, but saving it from financial ruin will remain Yuzuki’s responsibility. Kijo meets with the priestess, revealed to be Ryukoku’s head priestess Aoba who manipulated the meeting after realising Akemitsu is an Akagami. Due to the late hour they are forced to stay at the only available hotel, a Love Hotel. Akemitsu struggles to repress his lechery, especially after he correctly suspects Yuzuki watched a pornographic movie while he showered. For her safety he decides drastic measures are necessary. Yuzuki becomes so worked up in the shower she convinces herself into having sex with Akemitsu, only to be disappointed when she finds he has chained himself to the wall.
5	"How Shall I Make You Take Responsibility?"; Transliteration: "Dō Sekinin Totte Moraō ka na" (Japanese: どう責任とってもらおうかな)	Satoshi Nakagawa	Chabō Higurashi	Satoshi Nakagawa	August 6, 2023
Rumours spread Tsukuyo has a boyfriend after classmates see her with Akemitsu. Akemitsu visits with her forgotten bento, so she hides him in the infirmary, then when her friends almost see him hides him under the blanket with his face in her breasts. He overhears Tsukuyo recently quit archery club. It transpires Tsukuyo started archery to be close to Yuzuki but quit when Yuzuki quit, though Akemitsu suspects she wants to start again. Tsukuyo admits she enjoys archery but felt guilty enjoying herself while Yuzuki had to quit over worrying about the temple. Akemitsu shows her Yuzuki still practices in private, but is terrible at archery which is the real reason she quit, not the temple. With no reason to feel guilty Tsukuyo considers re-joining her club. She asks why Akemitsu keeps helping her and he admits he is sympathetic as his family circumstances also stopped him doing what he wanted with his life. Tsukuyo reveals during the infirmary incident he left a hickey on her breast and so gets revenge by writing “Perv-gami” on his face. The next day she deliberately forgets her bento, then when Akemitsu delivers it she tells her friends he is not her boyfriend, but he is part of her family. Akemitsu is glad to see her smiling as she re-joins archery club.
6	"Let's Establish Facts!"; Transliteration: "Rettsu Kiseijijitsu!!" (Japanese: Let's 既成事実!!)	Kentarō Iino	Chabō Higurashi	Taichi Atarashi	August 13, 2023
Kurage is excited about becoming an adult once she enters high school. She also enjoys all the changes around the temple since Akemitsu moved in. In a secret girls only meeting the girls reluctantly admit they are gaining weight since Akemitsu began cooking all their meals, so they decide to start exercising. When this fails to get results they decide to diet, though this would mean admitting to Akemitsu they need smaller portions. At that moment Akemitsu appears with homemade sweets, so the girls decide to just stop checking their weight so often. Kurage wonders if she should seduce Akemitsu when she is old enough. Akemitsu believes Yuzuki is angry and might execute him with an axe, but it turns out to be her new intensive training to become head priestess, to his relief. To support her Akemitsu agrees to undergo the same training, followed by Mia volunteering. Kiki reveals it usually takes a year just to become a priestess, yet Yuzuki is trying for 6 months so she can become head priestess by the deadline. Kijo visits with news that, for unexplained reasons, Yuzuki must successfully become a priestess within 3 months or he will end their fake engagement.
7	"What colour is your underwear?" Transliteration: "Anata no shitagi wa naniirodesu ka?" (Japanese: あなたの下着は何色ですか?)	Mitsutaka Noshitani	Chabō Higurashi	Eiji Suganuma	August 20, 2023
Kiki announces they must be pure at all times, starting with white underwear. Since Akemitsu, Yuzuki and Mia do not own white underwear she demands they wear no underwear at all. This is unbearably lewd, so they all buy new white underwear immediately. Kiki next announces they must share a bedroom. Kiki remembers Kijo warning her about a secret meeting of Sect Leaders at the temple at the 3 month deadline. After forcing them to share a sauna Kiki claims the training is to expose them to the opposite sex so they eventually become immune to lewd thoughts and closer to enlightenment. Akemitsu and Mia end up confessing their lewd thoughts as a training exercise, but Yuzuki continues to hide her lust for Akemitsu and jealousy of his friendship with Mia. Kiki gives them Christmas Eve off, though Akemitsu despises Christmas as his fathers girlfriends would violently fight over him every Christmas. Yuzuki takes him gift shopping as a distraction though quickly realises the shop assistants assume they are on a Christmas date. The other girls discuss the irony of first wanting to get rid of Akemitsu, and now they want him to stay. However, Kagura is shown to secretly view Akemitsu as a nuisance she plans to deal with.
8	"Seeing A Turtle Is Good Luck"; Transliteration: "Kame o miru to kōun ga otozureru" (Japanese: カメを見ると幸運が訪れる)	Yuuichi Abe	Yōhei Kashii	Yuuichi Abe	August 27, 2023
The girls decide to have a Christmas party but the gift exchange turns lewd when the randomised gifts include a marriage license, nude photographs and a vibrator. Kagura buys everyone hot spring tickets. Akemitsu and Yuzuki reveal they coincidentally bought each other personal gifts, prayer beads. Kiki interrupts with bad news; Sect Leaders are to inspect the temple and may decline Yuzuki’s promotion if the temple is in a poor state. Yuzuki panics since their temple idol is held together with duct tape. Trying not to think about it everyone visits the hot springs, unaware it includes mixed bathing. Kagura also manipulates the staff to drug Akemitsu with sexual stimulants. As the girls bathe Akemitsu is revealed to be trapped nearby, having hidden in a panic after discovering the mixed bathing and now with a drug induced erection. Kagura exposes him as a peeping tom but is frustrated when everyone quickly forgives him, mostly due to their fascination with his erection. Kagura confronts Akemitsu privately, revealing he is interfering with her lifelong goal to turn Mia into the Erotic Queen of the Christoph family. Akemitsu realises Kagura has been manipulating Mia for years in her role as a Baldwin, servants to the Christoph’s. Kagura offers enough money to pay his debts and completely repair the temple, but only if he leaves and never returns.
9	"Pounding Mochi is Dirty"; Transliteration: "Mochi-tsuki wa Ecchi" (Japanese: 餅つきは汚い)	Satoshi Nakagawa	Yōhei Kashii	Satoshi Nakagawa	September 3, 2023
It is almost New Year so the temple prepares Mochi; Akemitsu and Mia struggle when Kurage points out the lewd symbolism of pounding Mochi. Akemitsu is shocked when Kagura has Mia perform bunny girl penance. Mia almost faints from lewdness. Yuzuki is ready to punish Akemitsu until she realises bunny penance is not a real thing. Kiki asks Akemitsu once Yuzuki becomes Head Priest, will he become a priest himself, or leave. Everyone visits the Shinto shrine for New Year where Akemitsu decides to compliment every girl on their Yukata. When he gets to Yuzuki he gets so flustered he accidentally asks her for sex. Kagura has flashbacks showing Mia’s mother demanding Mia have sex with a man every three days or she will be returned home. Kagura has been faking the photographs but Akemitsu is a problem as Mia is in love with him, and love is taboo to the Christoph’s. Akemitsu rejects Kagura’s money, preferring to help Yuzuki himself. Kagura is infuriated; Mia loves Akemitsu but Akemitsu loves Yuzuki, and if Mia’s heart is broken she may never have sex with anyone. She yells at Akemitsu but realises she actually cares more about Mia than she thought. She recovers after kicking Akemitsu in the groin but soon feels guilty she could easily save the shrine and is lying to everyone.
10	"I Just Got A Little Turned On"; Transliteration: "Chotto kōfun shita dakeda" (Japanese: ちょっと興奮しただけだ)	Kentarō Iino	Chabō Higurashi	Kentarō Iino	September 10, 2023
Following the kick to the groin Akemitsu develops a Kagura-phobia so Mia decides to make them friends by locking them in the shed for 24 hours. Kagura determines Akemitsu is too nice to ruin her friendship with Mia by revealing her secrets. After escaping the shed by kicking the door down she decides to focus on having Akemitsu sleep with Mia, solving all her current problems. Tsukuyo has a sex dream about Akemitsu but Kagura deters her by showing her a video of Mia and Akemitsu, convincing Tsukuyo they are dating. Mia cluelessly confirms she is attracted to Akemitsu, making him her ideal training partner for resisting lewdness, leaving Tsukuyo jealous and angry at Akemitsu. Kurage ends up revealing the video was just Mia and Akemitsu playing twister. The temple runs out of rice and are forced to ask for tribute; a form of voluntary rent paid by people living on temple owned land, but no one donates them anything except for one woman who happily donates enough rice for weeks. She remembers how everyone used to offer regular tribute because they respected Yuzuki’s mother Tsukina, but after she left the practice was neglected. Akemitsu is curious why Tsukina chose to leave.
11	"The Body Doesn't Lie"; Transliteration: "Karada wa uso o tsukanai" (Japanese: 体は嘘をつかない)	Mitsutaka Noshitani	Chabō Higurashi	Kentarō Iino	September 17, 2023
Kiki decides to repair their idol, though it will cost ¥500,000. Akemitsu begins looking for part-time jobs. As he no longer owns a phone for employers to contact him he must borrow Yuzuki’s but almost faints when he sees her in a maid costume. Yuzuki plans to work several jobs, including café maid, so Akemitsu will not need to work. Akemitsu protests she cannot train and work multiple jobs without exhausting herself, so she challenges him; if he wants her phone he must somehow force her to sleep, starting with relaxing massage. While resisting his lust Akemitsu turns out to be an excellent masseuse. Tsukuyo overhears Yuzuki’s moans and barges in to stop them. Yuzuki still refuses to surrender her phone so Akemitsu angrily asks Tsukuyo out without explanation. That night Tsukuyo has dreams of marrying Akemitsu but is disappointed their “date” is just a trip to buy a new phone as he can buy it cheaper on a husband/wife payment plan. Tired of their constant misunderstandings Tsukuyo almost confesses but settles for asking for his new phone number. She misunderstands again when he reveals he got the phone for a secret reason, leading to another dream of Akemitsu taking her virginity, finding it boring and dumping her for another woman.
12	"No One Should Live Alone"; Transliteration: "Hito wa Ichinin de Ikiru ni Arazu" (Japanese: 人は一人で生きるにあらず)	Kazuomi Koga	Yōhei Kashii	Kazuomi Koga	September 24, 2023
Yuzuki considers apologising to Akemitsu, but runs away when she sees him and Tsukuyo returning home with Akemitsu’s new phone. Akemitsu also considers apologising after Kiki advises him not to forget what is important to him. A family of worshippers move their family grave to another temple and Kiki despairs when Yuzuki does it without charging the fees. Kiki abruptly ends Yuzuki’s training without explanation. Without training, and with Akemitsu doing most of the chores, Yuzuki has nothing to do and despairs she still can’t find a job either. Yuzuki later goes missing during a thunderstorm so Akemitsu runs into the rain to find her. Dizzy from fever Yuzuki remembers her mother successfully running the temple by herself, and fears she has failed. Akemitsu finds her under a bridge and carries her home. After she recovers Akemitsu asks her to stop trying to do everything alone and to let him help. Everyone eavesdropping agrees, they all love Mikazuki temple and will keep it running together. Having learned not to worry about what people think of her Kiki declares Yuzuki has moved closer to Enlightenment and will resume training once her fever improves. Yuzuki quits job searching and decides to repair the idol by requesting donations from worshippers.
13 (OVA)	"No Way, Why Is It So Big..."; Transliteration: "Iya, Nande Kon'nani ōkī Ndarou..." (Japanese: いや、なんでこんなに大きいんだろう…)	Unknown	Unknown	TBA	October 25, 2023
After exposure to a special incense, everyone in the temple wakes up to find they have swapped bodies. Akemitsu swaps with Yuzuki, Kiki swaps with Nyagosuke and is able to talk in his body while he keeps his cat instincts in her body, Tsukuyo goes into Kagura's body, Kagura goes into Kurage's body, Kurage goes into Mia's body, and Mia goes into Tsukuyo's body. Akemitsu is too embarrassed to leave Yuzuki's room or even change out of her pajamas. As everyone else regroups and some antics like subduing Nyagosuke and Yuzuki learning to urinate in a man's body, the effect wears off and everyone swaps back. Akemitsu tries to stop the others from checking on Yuzuki and fails. To stop himself from temptation, he tied up and blindfolded Yuzuki's body, causing her to scream.
14 (OVA)	"You Mustn't Touch That..."; Transliteration: "Sore ni Furete wa Ikemasen..." (Japanese: それに触れてはいけません…)	Unknown	Unknown	TBA	November 22, 2023
Akemitsu suddenly finds himself getting married, but the bride turns into Kijo, who declares he will close the temple and sics henchmen on him. Kagura shows up and beats up the henchmen, but Kijo destroys her clothes with laser eye beams. They run away and find themselves on the crescent moon, where Kagura tries to seduce Akemitsu. Resisting, he falls into the water and Tsukuyo as a mermaid rescues him. On shore, she turns into a human and tries to seduce him, but he resists and finds himself in a love hotel. Kurage turns into an adult and tries to seduce him, but Mia interrupts and attacks him with a sword. While running, Kiki tries to seduce him, but Mia captures him and tortures him as a dominatrix. Yuzuki interrupts and all the girls take him to the baths and wash him with their bodies. While he struggles to resist temptation, tentacles appear and capture them all, but Kagura breaks free and kicks him in the groin. It is then revealed that Akemitsu is bedridden with a fever and has been dreaming this whole time. The girls have been caring for him.

== Reception ==
By November 2021, the manga had over 1 million copies in circulation.

== See also ==
- Grand Blue Dreaming, another manga series illustrated by Kimitake Yoshioka
