= Masayoshi Nishida =

Japanese anime director

- 西田 正義
- Born: May 11, 1966 (age 60); Hatsukaichi, Hiroshima, Japan
- Occupation: Anime director

Masayoshi Nishida (西田 正義, Nishida Masayoshi; born May 11, 1966) is a Japanese anime director. He worked at the Tatsunoko Animation Technical Institute before joining Tezuka Productions. He has directed Mokke and Allison & Lillia and drawn storyboards for all episodes. His favorite anime is Haguregumo.

== Works ==
- Blue Blink (1989–1990; in-between animation)
- The Three-Eyed One (1990–1991; key animation)
- Ambassador Magma (1993; key animation)
- Benkei and Ushiwakamaru (1994; director)
- Essay on Insects (1995; animation director)
- Black Jack: Capital Transfer To Heian (1996; character designer)
- Kimba the White Lion (1997; storyboard, key animation)
- Saving our Fragile Earth: Unico Special Chapter (2000–2001; director, animation director, key animation)
- Princess Knight (1999; animation director)
- Metropolis (2001; key animation)
- Black Jack (2004; screenplay, production, animation director)
- Phoenix (2004; character designer)
- Eyeshield 21 (2005–2008; director)
- Mokke (2007–2008; director)
- Allison & Lillia (2008; director, storyboard)
- Black Jack Final (2011; animation director; episode 12)
- Grandpa and Grandma Turn Young Again (2024; director)
- Makina-san's a Love Bot?! (2025; director)
- My Sword Saint Master Is Too Cute to Live With! (2027; director)
