= Hitmaker =

Hitmaker is a musician who frequently releases hit songs.

Hitmaker or Hitmakers may refer to:

== Films and television ==
- Hitmaker (2014 TV program), a South Korean variety television show documenting formation and debut processes of two project music groups
- Hitmaker (2016 TV program), a South Korean variety television show
- Hitmakers (TV series), a Scandinavian reality television competition for songwriters
- Hitmakers (2025 TV series), an American music docu-reality series
- Hitmakers, original title of reality television program later changed for launching to Platinum Hit

== Music ==
- The Hitmakers, a Danish rock group
- The Hitmaker, a Fender Stratocaster guitar owned by Nile Rodgers

== Others ==
- Sega Hitmaker, was a division of Japanese video game developer Sega

== See also ==
- J. Sasikumar, Indian film director of Malayalam movies known as Hitmaker Sasikumar
- Sega AM3, renamed Hitmaker, as part of restructuring of Sega
