= Band of Brothers (South Korean TV program) =

South Korean television series

- Starring: Heechul; Jay Kim; Kangin; Kim Jung-mo
- Country of origin: South Korea
- No. of episodes: 13

Original release
- Network: Mnet
- Release: October 25, 2008 – January 23, 2009

Band of Brothers (Korean: 밴드 오브 브라더스), is a 30-minute-long Korean music reality show broadcast on Mnet.

== Cast ==
- Kim Hee-chul
- Jay Kim
- Kangin
- Kim Jung-mo

== Format ==
Heechul and Kangin of Super Junior, and Jay and Jungmo of TRAX form a "tribute band" to not only perform music by classic pop artists but they also explore the history about the band, their personal lives as well as the influence of their music.

== Episodes ==
| Track | Air Date | Summary |
|---|---|---|
| 01 | October 25, 2008 | The members gather together on October 3, 2008 and decide to form a band called Band of Brothers, even getting their own Audi convertible and group manager. They decide that the first track tribute will be to The Beatles. In the band positions, Jay as John Lennon (vocals), Kangin as Paul McCartney (bass), Heechul as Ringo Starr (drums), and Jungmo as George Harrison (guitar). They are given the trademark Beatles attire to wear and the favourite foods to eat, and also their very own groupie. They film their first music video "I Wanna Hold Your Hand". |
| 02 | November 1, 2008 | Today's artist is Queen, with Heechul as Freddie Mercury (vocals), Jay as John Deacon (bass), Kangin as Roger Taylor (drums), and Jungmo as Brian May (guitar). While choosing the song for their next music video, they tell their own personal stories from the song titles (Love of My Life, We Are The Champions, We Will Rock You). In the end, "We Will Rock You" is chosen for the MV. |
| 03 | November 8, 2008 | Tribute to 들국화, a popular Korean band in the 80s. To decide on lunch, the members have a karaoke contest. Jungmo sings "One" by Eve, Heechul sings "Girls' Generation" by Girls' Generation, Jay sings "Desperado" by The Eagles, while Kangin sings a trot song. Surprisingly, everyone scores 100 marks except Jay. After many failed attempts calling their celebrity friends to help, they meet up with band Super Kid to do a live performance of "Haeng Jin". |
| 04 | November 22, 2008 | Tribute to Bon Jovi. |
| 05 | November 29, 2008 | Highlight |
| 06 | December 6, 2008 | Band of Brothers decide to prepare for a Showcase special. They view video messages from other artists—Super Junior, V.O.S. SHINee, Wheesung, DBSK, Younha, FT Island, Wonder Girls, Kim Gun Mo, among others—who give their support even though with many doubts. Each member takes up a position for the preparation: Kangin as director, Jungmo as music supervisor, Heechul as plan supervisor, and Jay as the leader. They begin distributing leaflets for the Showcase. Special appearances of 2AM's Jo Kwon and Brown Eyed Girls as they show their support. |
| 07 | December 13, 2008 | The Showcase Shinee's audition |
| 08 | December 20, 2008 | Christmas Special |
| 09 | December 27, 2008 | The Showcase |
| 10 | January 3, 2009 | The Showcase Campus crash |
| 11 | January 9, 2009 | The Showcase Thai massage |
| 12 | January 16, 2009 | The Showcase Membership Training |
| 13 | January 23, 2009 | The Showcase |
