= Jay (South Korean singer) =

South Korean musician and actor (born 1983)

- 김견우
- Born: Kim Kyun-woo; April 8, 1983 (age 43); Seoul, South Korea
- Occupations: Singer; actor; vocal trainer
- Agent: Rainmaker Company
- Musical career
- Genres: Rock; hip hop; EDM
- Years active: 2002–present
- Label: SM
- Member of: TRAX
- Formerly of: SM The Ballad; SM Town

Korean name
- Hangul: 김견우
- RR: Gim Gyeonu
- MR: Kim Kyŏnu

Kim Kyun-woo (born April 8, 1983), known professionally as Jay (Korean: 제이), is a South Korean singer, actor and vocal trainer. He is a member of rock band TRAX and a former member of SM Entertainment's project group SM The Ballad.

== Career ==
In 2002, Jay (Typhoon) along with Minwoo (Rose), Jungwoo (Attack), Sungmin, Junsu and Eunhyuk made their first television appearance in a show called Heejun vs. Kangta, Battle of the Century: Pop vs. Rock. Moon Hee-jun taught Typhoon, Rose and Attack on to sing rock while Sungmin, Junsu, and Eunhyuk were taught other singing techniques by Kangta. The six trainees separated a year later, then Typhoon, Rose, and Attack debuted as members of rock band TraxX. The trio separated when Junsu went on to debut as a member of TVXQ. Then Sungmin and Eunhyuk joined ten other trainees and formed Super Junior 05, the first generation of rotational boy band Super Junior.

Jay made his official debut with TRAX on July 20, 2004 with the single Paradox.

In February 2009, Jay began his acting career with cast in supporting roles in MBC's Romance Zero.

In 2010, he participated in musicals Brothers Were Brave, Rock of Ages and rotated as D'Artagnan with Super Junior's Kyhuhyun in The Three Musketeers. He also cast in KBS's President alongside Super Junior's Sungmin, with plays the role of Sungmin's half-brother.

In May 2011, Jay landed his first leading role in KBS's drama My Bittersweet Life, playing the character Lee Se-in.

In May 2014, Jay was confirmed to cast in the musical Singin' In The Rain as Don Lockwood with Super Junior's Kyuhyun and EXO's Baekhyun. The musical ran from June 5, 2014 until August 3, 2014 at the Chungmu Art Hall in Seoul.

In September 2016, Jay was cast in supporting roles in KBS's drama On the Way to the Airport, playing the character Jang Hyun-woo.

In September 2017, Jay was cast in supporting roles in KBS1's Andante, playing the character Kang Hyun-woo.

== Personal life ==
Jay enlisted for a 2-year mandatory military service on 26 March 2012. He received four weeks of basic military training in Busan and then continued to serve as a public service worker. He was discharged in 2014.

== Discography ==
Year	Title	Song	Notes
2009	MBC Queen of Housewives OST	"너에게 원한건"	Solo
2011	Keep Your Head Down	"Crazy"	with TVXQ

== Filmography ==
=== Television series ===
Title	Year	Role	Notes
Romance Zero	2009	Kim Doo-hyun	Supporting role
The President	2010	Yoo Min-ki	Supporting role
My Bittersweet Life	2011	Lee Se-in	Lead role
On the Way to the Airport	2016	Jang Hyun-woo	Supporting role
Andante	2017–2018	Kang Hyun-woo	Supporting role
Missing	2018	Damien	Special Appearance
Through the Waves	2018	Cha Sang-pil	Lead role
Touch Your Heart	2019	Lee Kang-joon	Supporting role

=== Television shows ===
Title	Year	Role	Notes
Band of Brothers	2008	Regular Cast	with Kangin, Heechul, Jungmo

== Theater ==
Title	Year	Role	Notes	Ref.
The Three Musketeers	2009 and 2010	D'Artagnan		
Singin' In the Rain	2014	Don Lockwood		
