= List of Eyeshield 21 episodes =

The cover of the first DVD compilation released by Bandai Visual on 22 July 2005 in Japan

The anime series Eyeshield 21 is based on the manga series of the same name written by Riichiro Inagaki and illustrated by Yusuke Murata. The series is directed by Masayoshi Nishida and produced by TV Tokyo, NAS and Gallop. The plot of the episodes follows Sena Kobayakawa, a student who becomes an American football player against his desire but eventually becomes the star of the team, wearing an eyeshield to protect his identity.

Before the anime series was aired, Production I.G announced in August 2003 the production of an original video animation (OVA) that was released on Jump Festa Anime Tour 2003. The production of anime Eyeshield 21 was announced by Weekly Shōnen Jump at the end of 2004. Eyeshield 21 aired between April 6, 2005, and March 19, 2008, on TV Tokyo. The episodes were later released in thirty-six DVD compilations between July 22, 2005, and June 25, 2008, by Bandai Visual.

Viz Media and Cartoon Network released a dubbed version of Eyeshield 21 on the internet video streaming service Toonami Jetstream; the video was available on December 17, 2007. However, it was not completed due to Toonami Jetstream's defunct. The video streaming service Crunchyroll streamed Eyeshield 21 subtitled on its site beginning on January 2, 2009; the last episode was available on November 1, 2009, for premium users, and on March 7, 2010, for free users. Section23 Films through Sentai Filmworks released the first fifty-two episodes on four subtitled-only DVDs between May 18, 2010, and February 8, 2011.

The series use twelve pieces of theme music: five opening and seven ending themes. The opening themes are "Breakthrough" by Coming Century, "Innocence" by 20th Century, "Dang Dang" by ZZ, "Blaze Line" by Back-On, and "Honoo no Running back" (炎のランニングバック; lit. Flaming Running back) by Short Leg Summer. The ending themes are "Be Free" by Ricken's, "Blaze Away" by The Trax, "Goal" by Beni Arashiro, "Run to Win" by Aya Hirano, Miyu Irino, Koichi Nagano and Kappei Yamaguchi, "A day dreaming..." by Back-On, "Flower" by Back-On, and "Song of Power" by Short Leg Summer. Singles have been released of the individual songs, an original soundtrack and other four CDs were also released by Avex.

== Episode list ==
=== Episodes 1–72 ===
No.	Title	Original release date	Ref(s).
1	"The Man with the Lightspeed Legs!"; Transliteration: "Kōsoku no Ashi o Motsu Otoko" (Japanese: 光速の脚をもつ男)	April 6, 2005	
Sena Kobayakawa manages to enter Deimon High, the same school his friend Mamori Anezaki is currently attending. On his first day, all goes well until he runs into three bullies known as The Ha-Ha Brothers. As they drag him into the Football club to beat him up, Ryokan Kurita arrives and scares them away, thinking they wanted to join the Football club. Sena asks to be the team manager for Deimon Devil Bats and becomes friends with Kurita. On the way home, he again runs into the Ha-Ha brothers, who attempt to take his phone to find Kurita and assault him. Sena manages to run away from them, revealing his great speed and agility. Yoichi Hiruma happens to witness Sena's abilities as he escapes from the bullies. The next day, Hiruma forces Sena to join the team as a running back under the alias "Eyeshield 21".
2	"Let's Play Football!"; Transliteration: "Amefuto Yarouze!" (Japanese: アメフトやろうぜ!)	April 13, 2005	
Sena arrives at school early to do some training. Hiruma has Sena and Kurita do the 40-yard dash to see how fast they are. Kurita gets 6.5 seconds and Hiruma gets 5.1 seconds, while Sena manages the "Speed of Light," 4.2 seconds, thanks to Hiruma making Sena the bait for his pet dog Cerberus. Later, Hiruma conscripts Sena and Kurita into helping him recruit nine more players for the team so they can meet the player count requirements; the one to hire the lowest would face a penalty from Hiruma. Sena manages to recruit Tetsuo Ishimaru to the team, while Hiruma retrieves the rest. They are now ready to play American Football.
3	"Blaze a Path Down the Field!"; Transliteration: "Fīrudo o Nejifusero" (Japanese: フィールドをねじふせろ)	April 20, 2005	
It is Eyeshield 21's debut game -- a match against the Koigahama Cupids, whose players often bring their girlfriends to their game. Shin and Sakuraba from the Ojo White Knights also appear as spectators, recording the game.
4	"What I Hold In My Hands!"; Transliteration: "Sono Te ni Tsukamumono" (Japanese: その手に掴むもの)	April 27, 2005	
The Deimon Devil Bats have won their first game of the year. However, their next match is against the Ojo White Knights, one of the best teams in Japan. Also, Mamori is accepted to join the American Football Club as manager, while Sena acts as secretary.
5	"Half-Second Bodyguards!"; Transliteration: "0.5 Byo no Bodīgādo" (Japanese: 0.5秒のボディーガード)	May 4, 2005	
Intimidated by the imposing statures of the White Knights players, Sena thinks of quitting American Football. Kurita reminds him that he has guards around him, so things will be alright.
6	"The Pierce of the Spear Tackle!"; Transliteration: "Sakuretsu! Supia Takkuru" (Japanese: 炸裂!スピアタックル)	May 11, 2005	
The Deimon Devil Bats are up 6-0. However, the Ojo White Knights' ace linebacker Shin is put into play, turning the tide in favor of the White Knights.
7	"Fighting to Win!"; Transliteration: "Katsu Tame no Tatakai" (Japanese: 勝つための戦い)	May 18, 2005	
The Deimon Devil Bats are in trouble once Shin joins the game. Eyeshield 21 does not want to play any longer after suffering from Shin's Spear Tackle. The Ojo White Knights' Sakuraba, on the other hand, has to decide between the game or fame. Hiruma threatens to leave the match halfway through, until Eyeshield 21 promises to defeat Shin even once.
8	"Never Quit!"; Transliteration: "Akiramenai!" (Japanese: あきらめない!)	May 25, 2005	
The Deimon Devil Bats are already sure to lose the game, but Eyeshield 21 is still determined to get past Shin. Eyeshield 21 runs into the Ojo White Knights' Sakuraba, who goes onto the field accidentally to retrieve his last promotional sticker from his idol manager, Miracle Ito. The popular idol is injured as a result and his fans blame this incident on Eyeshield 21. Eyeshield 21 gets past Shin at last and scores Deimon's last touchdown. Shin thinks that Eyeshield 21 is at "a speed where all the power in the world would not be able to touch him." Results: Ojo White Knights defeat Deimon Devil Bats 68 to 12. Sena thinks to return to his normal life but then realizes his true love for American Football; Hiruma persuades him to start preparing for a more important tournament, the Autumn Tournament, which decides the contestants for the Christmas Bowl.
9	"The Catching Master!"; Transliteration: "Kyacchi no Tatsujin" (Japanese: キャッチの達人)	June 1, 2005	
The episode begins with Sena walking to school holding a football. A baseball lands at his feet and Raimon "Monta" Taro comes to retrieve it. When told to give Monta the ball, Sena throws the football, but it slips from his hand. Monta saves it splendidly from getting run over by a truck. Monta is put in the third string of the baseball team, the reserves of the reserves, due to his inability to throw or bat. Sena convinces him to play football, since the Devil Bats need a specialized catcher, a wide receiver. Monta accepts the offer after watching an interview of his baseball idol, thus becoming Devil Bats #80.
10	"A Hero's Qualifications!"; Transliteration: "Hīrō no Shikaku" (Japanese: ヒーローの資格)	June 8, 2005	
In the previous match between the Devil Bats and the White Knights, Eyeshield 21 accidentally ran over Sakuraba, causing Sakuraba to be hospitalized. Hiruma poses as Eyeshield 21 and taunts that the accident was not accidental. Monta and Sena decide to go to the hospital to personally apologize for what happened. "Ace" Sakuraba reveals his feelings of inferiority to the true ace, Shin, and his true reasons to be a TV idol, to attract more attention. Torakichi, Sakuraba's fan, encourages Sakuraba to train hard to be a true American Football player.
11	"Oath Under the Setting Sun"; Transliteration: "Yūhi no Chikai" (Japanese: 夕陽の誓い)	June 15, 2005	
Hiruma has just arranged a practice match against the Zokugaku Chameleons, a team notorious for dirty play and led by linebacker Rui Habashira, who has extremely long arms. Sena and Monta are about to buy backup gear for their next match when a motorcyclist steals their money. With Shin's help, the two are able to retrieve it. Shin tells them that he and the White Knights will be waiting for the Devil Bats in the finals.
12	"Max Catch!"; Transliteration: "Kyacchi! Makkusu!!" (Japanese: キャッチ!マックス!!)	June 22, 2005	
It is the Deimon Devil Bats vs the Zokugaku Chameleons. After being tackled by Habashira, Sena starts imagining Habashira being everywhere, thus becoming petrified. Will Sena be able to snap out of it and achieve victory for the Deimon Devil Bats?
13	"The Terror of the Chameleon!"; Transliteration: "Kamereon no Kyōfu" (Japanese: カメレオンの恐怖)	June 29, 2005	
Eyeshield 21 watches as Monta gets up after being tackled again and again. Monta puts on a brave face and encourages Sena despite being heavily battered and barely able to walk straight. Soon, Sena realizes that he does not need to fear Habashira, since he has faced a better linebacker in Shin. The Devil Bats defeat the Chameleons with a score of 46-28, which, due to a bet made prior to the game, results in the whole Zokugaku gang becoming Hiruma's new slaves.
14	"The Scorching Hell Tower"; Transliteration: "Shakunetsu no Heru Tawā" (Japanese: 灼熱のHELL TOWER (ヘル タワー))	July 6, 2005	
Due to a great number of applicants for the American Football Club, Hiruma decides to hold a try-out. He rents the Tokyo Tower for the whole day, and instructs the applicants that they must carry ice to the top of the tower and reach with top with at least one ice cube still intact. Hiruma even places obstacles along the way, further heightening the difficulty of the challenge. Kurita finds an apprentice in Komusubi, and four more players are accepted: the Ha-Ha Brothers and the weak but persistent Manabu Yukimitsu.
15	"Find Eyeshield!"; Transliteration: "Aishīrudo o Sagase!" (Japanese: アイシールドを探せ!)	July 13, 2005	
Hiruma realizes that Eyeshield 21 has good acceleration but bad stamina, so he asks all Deimon students to hunt down Eyeshield 21 or he will spread scandalous information about them. He also promises his Zokugaku slaves that he will release them if they find out who Eyeshield is. Mamori, who also wants to find out Eyeshield's identity, follows him around and is abducted by Hibashira and his gang to be bait for Eyeshield. Sena reveals his identity, but Hiruma makes every Devil Bat member put on #21 uniforms and eyeshields to make Hibashira believe that Sena is a fake. Since Hibashira cannot find out who Eyeshield really is, their slavery is extended for another three months.
16	"Farewell Kurita?!"; Transliteration: "Sayonara, Kurita!?" (Japanese: さよなら、栗田!?)	July 20, 2005	
Kurita has been accused by shop owners of ruining their decorations for a festival. Knowing that the Devil Bats will be disqualified for the Christmas Ball if one of the members has to face disciplinary action, Kurita withdraws from the team. Other Devil Bats members look for the real culprits to make them confess so that Kurita does not have to leave the team. With the help of the two American girls who were being bullied by the culprits the night of the disaster, Kurita's name is cleared. At the end of the episode, it is revealed through a TV broadcast that the Statue of Liberty is carrying a flag that informs the public of the current recruitment for the Devil Bats. The team understands that Hiruma asked the girls to fly back to Japan from New York in order to act as Kurita's witnesses.
17	"The Kid and Iron Horse"; Transliteration: "Kiddo & Aian Hōsu" (Japanese: キッド&アイアンホース)	July 27, 2005	
The Deimon Devil Bats are going to hold a barbecue lunch. However, it is still part of the training Hiruma wants to give the new teammates. Hiruma orders them to memorize passing routines for football. Hiruma tosses out the meat as though he is passing the ball, so whoever has memorized the routines gets to eat the meat. In order to make his teammates understand how important memorizing passing routines is, Hiruma takes them to the game between the Ojo White Knights and the Seibu Wild Gunmen. Kid and the Iron Horse belong to the Gunmen, and because the Iron Horse knows all of his routines well, the Gunmen are in the lead. Ojo still wins, however, because the Iron Horse has to sit half of the game out.
18	"A Slacker's Pride"; Transliteration: "Rokudenashi no Puraido" (Japanese: ろくでなしのプライド)	August 10, 2005	
A magazine publishing company needs a Japanese football team to compete against an American team, and thus holds a contest for it. Hiruma applies, but finds out that the editor has already decided that it will be the Taiyo Sphinx who will compete against the NASA Aliens. Back at the school, the Ha-ha Brothers have already decided that they are quitting the team even though Hiruma is still blackmailing them with their naked pictures. In a restaurant, they hear some members of the Taiyo Sphinx talking about how useless they are as defensive linemen. The brothers are beaten up by a Sphinx member, and to get revenge, decide to return to the team and help the Devil Bats defeat the Sphinx.
19	"The Lower-class Laughs At Its Challengers!"; Transliteration: "Shoshimin wa Chōsen-sha o Warau" (Japanese: 小市民は挑戦者を笑う)	August 17, 2005	
It is a game between the Sphinx and the Devil Bats for the right to represent Japan against the Aliens. The Sphinx prides itself on the heaviest line in Japan. After suffering from a Sky-Blue, Kurita is already losing heart, but Hiruma reminds him that they need to win the Christmas Bowl, thus restoring Kurita's confidence. The special strategy practiced by the Huh-huh Brothers is revealed: a "scumbag scramble" taught to them by Zokugaku's Hibashira and his gang.
20	"The Sphinx's Secret Weapon!"; Transliteration: "Sufinkusu no Himitsu Heiki" (Japanese: スフィンクスの秘密兵器)	August 24, 2005	
When the going gets tough for them, the Sphinx reveals their secret weapon: a freshman called Kamaguruma who uses his "chariot bump" against Monta in order to stop Monta from catching Hiruma's passes.
21	"Fly, Devil Bat!"; Transliteration: "Tobe! Debiru batto" (Japanese: 翔べ! デビルバット)	August 31, 2005	
The Devil Bats are trailing to the Sphinx. Hiruma insists that Monta catches his passes, reminding Monta that the outfield is his backyard. The match ends with a draw.
22	"A Mysterious Girl Appears!"; Transliteration: "Nazo no Shōjo Arawaru" (Japanese: 謎の少女現る)	September 7, 2005	
A sixteen-year-old expert inline skater and part-time reporter named Taki Suzuna is searching for Eyeshield 21's real identity, stalking the Devil Bats team. She challenges him to race her, starting from a shrine all the way to the bottom of the hill. Sena has no choice but to accept, because if he does not, she will write an article on how spineless he is. But when an accident occurs, Sena has to save Suzuna before she plunges to her death in the forest below.
23	"The Weightless Man!"; Transliteration: "Mujoryoku no Otoko" (Japanese: 無重力の男)	September 7, 2005	
The American team accepts the game against the Deimon Devil Bats. Sena and a man called Panther each learn how fast the other is. Wanting to go up against each other, they do their best to ensure total victory for their team. There is one problem, though: the American coach hates Panther, and will not let him play. The only hope for Panther to play against Sena lies in the capture of a cat.
24	"Blitz! Japan vs. USA!"; Transliteration: "Dengeki! Nichimei Kessen" (Japanese: 電撃! 日米決戦)	September 14, 2005	
The NASA Aliens and the Deimon Devil Bats are ready for their game, but unless the blitz works, Deimon learns they will be deported from Japan. Can Sena use his speed to stop the tag team duo of Homer and Watts?
25	"The Caged Black Panther!"; Transliteration: "Ori no Naka no Kurojō" (Japanese: 檻の中の黒豹)	September 21, 2005	
Trailing 14-6, Deimon has managed to stop the Shuttle Pass and is slowly progressing the ball with the sweep, but Sena wants to embarrass the Aliens and allow Panther on the field. Will Panther finally get his time to shine?
26	"A Real Beast!"; Transliteration: "Yasei no Riaru" (Japanese: 野生のリアル)	September 28, 2005	
Trailing 26-21, the NASA Aliens finally unleash Panther and their new Moonsault Formation. Shin watches eagerly as he realizes a new speedster could threaten his reign, but will either team manage to win the wager, and what will happen if both lose?
27	"Take Back Cerberus!"; Transliteration: "Dakkan! Keruberosu" (Japanese: 奪還!ケルベロス)	October 5, 2005	
Hiruma drags his team out of Japan to Houston for a bootcamp. He brings Cerberus with him, asking Sena to look after the dog. On the airplane is a little girl who has a stuffed toy that looks like Cerberus. Beside the little girl sit two wanted men. The men put a big jewel inside the stuffed toy when the girl is sleeping. Jumounji, going to the bathroom because he feels airsick, brings the stuffed toy back to Cerberus' seat when he returns. The little girl mistakes Cerberus for her stuffed toy and lures him into a suitcase with beef jerkies. Sena and the others have to look for Cerberus before Hiruma finds out about the loss.
28	"American Football Downtown!"; Transliteration: "Amefuto·Dauntaun" (Japanese: アメフト·ダウンタウン)	October 12, 2005	
When Sena and Monta get lost in America, they end up at a football field where Panther learned to play. Panther's grandmother notices how well they can play, and asks if they could play with their team. As soon as the match is over, a player's wife goes into labor. The doctor is out fishing on the beach, so Sena needs to get him before it becomes too late. Meanwhile, Hiruma finally finds what he is looking for.
29	"Ultimate Combo! The Devil Gunmen!"; Transliteration: "Kessei·Debiru Ganmanzu" (Japanese: 結成·デビルガンマンズ!)	October 19, 2005	
Hiruma orders the members of Devil Bats to go to the beach. Sena, Mamori, and Monta come across the Seibu Wild Gunmen's coach and Kid. They form a five-man team that will compete in a beach football game for the prize of a Texan beef carcass and $1000. Due to Mamori's presence, Sena cannot perform well. After a while, Tetsuma arrives to wake Kid up (he was ordered by Kid to wake him up after three hours) and thus replaces the coach. Hiruma, who is trying to convince an old man to be the Devil Bats' coach, sees the Wild Gunmen and replaces Mamori. They win the tournament, and the old man tells Hiruma that he is going to think about the offer.
30	"At the Gates of Hell!"; Transliteration: "Jigoku e no Kyōkai-sen" (Japanese: 地獄への境界線)	October 26, 2005	
The Devil Bats are resting at the Wild Gunmen ranch. The coach has agreed to train them. Hiruma mentions that Deimon does not allow extracurricular activities after the second year so it is his and Kurita's last chance for the Christmas Bowl. That means they must improve in 40 days, not 405 (a year plus 40). Hiruma says the team must do the death march and that he will complete it even if it kills him. On the day the Devil Bats are supposed to return to Japan, the whole team chooses to go through the death march along with Hiruma and Kurita.
31	"Minds Made Up!"; Transliteration: "Sorezore no Ketsui" (Japanese: それぞれの決意)	November 2, 2005	
The death march training begins. Monta and Yukimitsu must run routes while Hiruma shoots them. The defensive linemen must push a truck. Sena has to kick a rock across the whole 2000 km. The NASA Aliens have changed their name to the NASA Shuttles to escape Hiruma's promise, which bans them from returning to the US. Shin is hiking on Mt. Fuji every day. Panther tries to challenge Shin and loses. Panther asks Shin if Sena would have gotten past him; Shin says possibly if he gets past his weakness.
32	"Quitters?"; Transliteration: "Makeinu wa Iruka" (Japanese: 負け犬はいるか)	November 9, 2005	
The training and the heat intensify as the team treks across Texas, but when the situation continues to get rougher, it could lead to one or two people trying to quit altogether. Is this the end of the Devil Bats' training?
33	"OH! My Sister!"; Transliteration: "OH! Mai Shisutā!" (Japanese: OH!マイシスター!)	November 16, 2005	
Sena accidentally kicks the rock into a motorcycle gang. Knowing that he will have to run the whole Death March again if he loses it, he runs after them, and gets separated from the rest of the team. There, he literally crashes in Suzuna, who is still looking for her missing brother. They go to a stadium where a professional American Football tryout is being held. It turns out that her brother is there, hoping to become a professional. When the tryout starts, Sena goes in, but is overwhelmed by the crowd. Will he be able to survive, and help Suzuna's brother to achieve his dreams?
34	"Signs of a Ghost!"; Transliteration: "Gōsuto no Taidō" (Japanese: ゴーストの胎動)	November 23, 2005	
Sena applies all the training from the death march in the match. When he scores the winning goal, Sena's last opponent declares that he saw a ghost beside Sena as he ran. When the names of those who passed are read out, Suzuna's brother's name is skipped. He did not make it, and so Sena asks him to become a member of the Deimon Devil Bats. He accepts, and the Taki siblings and Sena leave. Right after that, the announcer says Sena's name...
35	"A Solitary Death March!"; Transliteration: "Kodoku no Desu Māchi" (Japanese: 孤独のデス·マーチ)	November 30, 2005	
Yukimitsu collapses during the run. If he does not complete the run, he will be dropped from the team.
36	"The Final Trial!"; Transliteration: "Saigo no Shiren" (Japanese: 最後の試練)	December 7, 2005	
The Devil Bats truck gets stuck in a pothole; with one final push together as a team, Deimon overcomes the last obstacle. Arriving in Las Vegas, on the pirate boat outside Treasure Island, Doburoku confronts Sena to see if the ghost move is complete. Sena passes through Doburoku with the new Devil Bat ghost move, and Doburoku realizes Sena's unlimited potential. At the hotel, everyone rests in preparation for the journey home. The next day, Hiruma sells Doburoku's truck and tells him to go to the casino and bet his all on roulette 21#'s on red 21. The money pays off Doburoku's debt and he returns to Japan with the team.
37	"The Distant Peak"; Transliteration: "Harukanaru Itadaki" (Japanese: 遥かなる頂)	December 14, 2005	
The Devil Bats return to Japan, but Hiruma informs them that Ojo lost to Shinryuji. Meanwhile, Sakuraba reaches a breaking point and seriously considers his future as a football player.
38	"The New Starting Lineup?!"; Transliteration: "Regyurā Ketsutei!?" (Japanese: レギュラー決定!?)	December 21, 2005	
The Deimon Devil Bats have returned home. Hiruma must decide on the regular players. Everyone but Yukimitsu is chosen. Yukimitsu will continue to be a bench player.
39	"The Road to the Christmas Bowl!"; Transliteration: "Kurisumasu Bouru e no Michi" (Japanese: クリスマスボウルへの道)	January 11, 2006	
While hiding from a group of television interviewers, Suzuna questions why Sena does not tell Mamori who he is. This leads to a quick review of the previous 38 episodes. In Japan this aired as an hour-long special with 40. Sena tells Suzuna that he will tell Mamori his identity when he is truly strong, namely when he defeats his ultimate rival, Shin Seijuro.
40	"The Night Before the Game!"; Transliteration: "Kessen Mae Yoru!" (Japanese: 決戦前夜!)	January 11, 2006	
Kurita and the other Devil Bats learn that one loss means their entire dream will end. Once he gets home, Kurita goes into hiding, not wanting to be the cause of the Devil Bats' failure. Can the others convince him to come out?
41	"The Ace's Missing?!"; Transliteration: "Ēsu Ketsumetsu!?" (Japanese: エース消滅!?)	January 18, 2006	
Deimon are up against Amino, a school where they use medical science to increase their muscle sizes. They are all artificial muscles. Sena follows "idiot" Taki onto the wrong bus and ends up to a faraway place, Nagano. Meanwhile Deimon, without their ace, must defeat Amino. At first the Deimon defensive linemen cannot hold Amino back and have a touchdown scored on them. Then Doburoku brings in a truck and tells them to push it until they remember how to push with their hips instead of just their arms, just like during the Death March. Deimon pushes through the line and Monta catches a ball for a first down. Current score 7-0.
42	"The Devil Bat Ghost!"; Transliteration: "Debiru Batto Gōsuto!!" (Japanese: デビルバットゴースト!!)	January 25, 2006	
Chameleon Habashira Rui gives Sena a lift to the stadium on his motorcycle. In the game, Amino decides to target Monta and tackle him on offense and defense. Amino scores another touchdown and Ishimaru and Monta both score touchdowns for Deimon. The current score is 14-12. Sena is launched off the bike and lands in the stadium with a flashy appearance. He reveals his Devil Bat Ghost, a technique where a runner increases his speed and turns so that the opponent cannot predict where the runner will turn, while the linebacker sees a ghostly image where the player seems to have disappeared like smoke. Shin acknowledges that Sena has grown again. The final score is 36-14, Deimon's first victory.
43	"The Legendary 60-Yard Magnum"; Transliteration: "Densetsu no 60 Yādo Magunamu" (Japanese: 伝説の60ヤードマグナム)	February 1, 2006	
Monta and Sena are reluctant to recruit the legendary kicker "60 yard Magnum" Musashi back onto the team. Being misled by soccer students who say a person called "MUro SAtoSHI" is Musashi, Monta and Sena try to recruit him into the American Football team. Meanwhile, a player called Sasaki Koutarou, the Bando Spiders' famed "smart" kicker, appears to challenge Musashi. Will Sena and Monta be able to convince Musashi to rejoin the team?
44	"A ha ha! My debut!" Transliteration: "Ahāhā! Boku Debyū!!" (Japanese: アハーハー!ボクデビュー!!)	February 8, 2006	
Taki must pass the entrance exam to be able to play for Deimon. Suzuna tells them Taki has failed every single school with American football in Japan (except Deimon which has accepted every student due to their small number of application students, but Natsuhiko left Japan before being accepted). It turns out Taki is indeed an idiot and Suzuna leaves in frustration, with Sena following to comfort her. As it turns out, Taki can answer the question if it is somehow related to American Football. Taki does the exam; a bare pass is 200. At night as the marker is marking the sheet when Hiruma's shadow appears behind him. As the marker announces Taki is safe with 203 points, Hiruma's shadow disappears, and the marker also mentions how he feels that he is the one who "made it." Deimon beats the Zokugaku Chameleons in a practice match because of Taki. At the end, the Zokugaku Chameleons are seen carrying their motorcycles on their backs home as their punishment from their manager, Megu Tsuyumine.
45	"The Ghost is Sealed?!"; Transliteration: "Gōsuto Fūin!?" (Japanese: ゴースト封印!?)	February 15, 2006	
Hiruma forbids Sena to use the Devil Bat Ghost until a real game in order to keep spies from getting looks at it. Meanwhile Shin and Ootawara from Ojo have begun practicing in a corporation league, the Shuei Elephants, to better hone their skills. The freshmen of the Devil Bats have decided to go to the same stadium, Shuei Stadium, to inspect the next playing field. The Shuei Elephants and the Samurai Warriors have an important practice match together, but Taki Natsuhiko leads some of the Samurai Warriors' regulars onto the wrong bus to Nagano Hot Springs (again). Due to the Samurai Warriors' lack of players in the match, Komusubi and Monta substitute and play in the corporation league practice match. Sena is determined to play in the match as well but cannot play due to the lack of an eyeshield, but Suzuna manages to find an eyeshield so Sena saves the match when he enters the game. But Shin wants to see Sena's devil-like Ghost Run instead of it being sealed.
46	"The Ghost vs. The Spear!"; Transliteration: "Gōsuto vs Supia" (Japanese: ゴーストvsスピア)	February 22, 2006	
Now substituting in a corporation league game, Sena and Shin finally get the rematch they've been waiting so long for. However, Shin is disappointed as Sena refuses to use the Devil Bat Ghost due to his previous orders from Hiruma. The Samurais are losing due to Ootawara and Shin's entrance into the game, and the line cannot withstand Ootawara. The Huh-Huh brothers arrive and see Sena, Monta, and Komusubi playing, so they too join the game. Shin tells Sena that since he finally got the chance to face him, he will not hold back, and that Sena should not either. With the encouragement of Monta, Komusubi, and the Ha-Ha brothers, Sena decides to use the Devil Bat Ghost.
47	"Hot! Guts! Fire!"; Transliteration: "Atsuize! Gattsu!!" (Japanese: 熱いぜ!ガッツ!!)	March 1, 2006	
The Devil Bats witness the physical endurance and team bond of the Yuhi Guts, their next opponents in the tournament. Hiruma says that objectively, the Devil Bats have a 99% chance of winning, but the Yuhi Guts have a 1% chance of defeating them due to having three years' more experience. The Devil Bats then go to watch Ojo's game against the Sankaku Punks.
48	"A Battle of Effort, Fortitude, and Will!"; Transliteration: "Doryoku! Gensei! Zenryoku Shōbu!" (Japanese: 努力!根性!全力勝負!)	March 8, 2006	
Deimon's game against the Guts begins. Hiruma tries to put pressure on them with words about this being their last chance to go to the Christmas Bowl. However, the Guts' coach has replaced the regular players with athletes from other clubs in order to win, and the regulars are not allowed to play. The Guts intercept the ball near the beginning of the game and score a touchdown and get the extra point, but after seeing them play, Hiruma lowers the Guts' previous 1% chance of winning to 0%.
49	"The Refined Spirit of a Lineman!"; Transliteration: "Ibushi Gin·Rain Tamashī" (Japanese: いぶし銀·ライン魂!)	March 15, 2006	
The Devil Bats meet the captain of the Hashiratani Deers, Yamamoto Onihei. The Devil Bats go watch the Deers game against the Kyoshin Poseidon, in order to see the team that might become their future opponents. However, they are all disappointed to see the veteran Hashitarani Deers lose to the Kyoshin Poseidons.
50	"The Courage to Stand Firm!"; Transliteration: "Nigenai Yūki!" (Japanese: 逃げない勇気!)	March 22, 2006	
Sena learns the truth about the "real" Eyeshield 21 from a Poseidon player, Kakei Shun. Discouraged after hearing that he may never catch up to the real Eyeshield 21, Sena learns from Shin that it is not size that matters but an unwavering spirit.
51	"Danger! The Lethal Chameleon"; Transliteration: "Ayaushi! Saikyō no Kamereon" (Japanese: 危うし!最凶のカメレオン)	March 29, 2006	
Eyeshield 21 enters the Chameleons' locker room and cuts up all their uniforms in the middle of the night. Sena said he did not do it. The Chameleons enter Deimon and try to find Eyeshield 21. They find out the Scorpions were impersonating Eyeshield.
52	"Clash! Chameleon vs Poseidon"; Transliteration: "Gekitotsu! Kamereon vs Poseidon" (Japanese: 激突!カメレオンvsポセイドン)	April 5, 2006	
Chamelon and Poseidon start their game. Poseidon has a great advantage because they have tall players. On the other hand, the Chameleons are not united. Habashira's team gave up halfway through. Habashira tries to encourage them and force his team to win, but fails. In the end, Rui confronts Hiruma and cries out through his tears, "What exactly is the difference between you and me?!"
53	"Fear of the Poisonous Scorpion!"; Transliteration: "Kyōfu no DOku Sasori!" (Japanese: 恐怖の毒サソリ!)	April 12, 2006	
The scorpion is playing really dirty. They are also predicting the Devil Bats' every move. Hiruma disappears during the game. Kurita must stay strong to win against those cowards.
54	"The Control Tower which Disappeared"; Transliteration: "Kieta Shireitō" (Japanese: 消えた司令塔)	April 19, 2006	
At the end of the first quarter Mamori opens the game plan Hiruma gave her, which shows that Hiruma predicted every single thing that happened in the first quarter. At last Hiruma appears. The Devil Bats win the game with the help of Hiruma's Devil plans. Hiruma confirms his new slave after the game.
55	"Wall of the Physique Difference"; Transliteration: "Taigakusa no Kabe" (Japanese: 体格差の壁)	April 26, 2006	
After being told by Mizumachi from the Poseidons that he is no good at football, Komosubi runs away from him. He thinks that because he is short, he is useless to the Devil Bats. Everyone goes looking for him and they convince him to return home.
56	"Our Small Contract!"; Transliteration: "Ucchare Kokekkan!" (Japanese: うっちゃれ小結関!)	May 3, 2006	
Komusubi starts learning sumo. With his special training, he finds a way to overcome the physical difference between himself and Mizumachi and Kakei.
57	"The Man Who Knows 21"; Transliteration: ""21" o Shirumono" (Japanese: 「21」を知る者)	May 10, 2006	
When Monta and Sena are sent to spy on the Poseidons' final practice before the game, they are caught, and Kakei tells Sena that he wants to challenge Eyeshield 21 from the Devil Bats and prove to him that he will never match up to the "real" Eyeshield 21. Sena gets past him using the Devil Bat Ghost, but Hiruma, who had been watching, tells Sena that it was not Kakei's true strength he was running against.
58	"Devil vs Sea God"; Transliteration: "Akuma vs Umi no Kami" (Japanese: 悪魔vs海の神)	May 17, 2006	
The game against the Kyoshin Poseidons is about to begin. Kakei tells Sena that he will prove once and for all that he's not qualified to bear the name "Eyeshield 21." Hiruma then states that the taller team will not win, but the team that wins will be the team that is better at American Football.
59	"Back Ace Man"; Transliteration: "Ura Ēsu no Otoko" (Japanese: 裏エースの男)	May 24, 2006	
The hidden ace of the Deimon Devil bats appears, being the crucial key to their new formation: Wishbone.
60	"Promise on the Field!"; Transliteration: "Fīrudo no yakusoku!" (Japanese: フィールドの約束!)	May 31, 2006	
The Devil Bats have made a comeback, the score is 14-12, and Deimon has the ball. Kakei finds a way to exploit the weakness of the wishbone formation. However, Hiruma finds another way to overcome their new plan, and they score another touchdown, putting the Devil Bats in the lead.
61	"Determination to Win!"; Transliteration: "Shōri e no Shūnen!" (Japanese: 勝利への執念!)	June 7, 2006	
The game continues with a stalemate with both teams trying to break the trend and score, knowing that this will lean the game highly in their favor.
62	"Terror! Moby Dick Anchor"; Transliteration: "Senritsu! Mobyi Dikku Ankā" (Japanese: 戦慄!モビィディック·アンカー)	June 14, 2006	
The Poseidons reveal a new formation called High Wave. Hiruma immediately spots its weakness, but Sena cannot get past Kakei. The ball is turned over to Kyoshin, and they score a touchdown, giving them a five-point lead. They try to get an extra two points, but due to Hiruma's plan, the ball is intercepted by Monta. With 1 minute left in the game, Deimon's only hope is for Sena to get past Kakei.
63	"Offense and Defence 30 cm!!" Transliteration: "30 Senchi no Kōhō!!" (Japanese: 30 センチの攻防!!)	June 21, 2006	
Sena breaks through Kakei's Moby Dick Anchor, but he is stopped just inches from the touchdown by a desperate Mizumachi. Hiruma uses their last timeout with two seconds remaining and the Devil Bats behind by five points. They decide to have Sena jump over their line in a joint combination with Monta so that he goes twice as high. The plan succeeds, and they score a touchdown, winning the game. Kakei tells Sena that it no longer matters whether he is the original Eyeshield 21 or not, but that what matters is that he is one of the most excellent players Kakei has ever seen, and that Sena is Eyeshield 21.
64	"The Man Possessing Speed of Light Appears!?"; Transliteration: "Kōsoku no Otoko Arawaru!?" (Japanese: 光速の男現る!?)	June 28, 2006	
Riku appears and talks about his past and how Sena could run because of him. Riku asks Sena who he thinks is the best player. His answer? Shin. He then asks why and Sena says because "his power and speed are incredible." Riku is part of Seibu who missed the game before due to his pride. Seibu beats the Fishermen 49-0.
65	"Deimon High School Sports Meet!!"; Transliteration: "Deimon Kōkō Taiiku Matsuri dā!!" (Japanese: 泥門高校体育祭だァ!!)	July 5, 2006	
The whole Deimon team goes to a sports meeting where the team is divided into two teams, Mamori san, Hiruma, and Yukimitsu (the smart team) vs everyone else on the football team (the brawn team). They play tug-o-war and other sports. The "brawn team" finally finds out that Hiruma has plotted all the sports games to teach the team how to do the "bump" in his evil plotting ways by handcuffing everyone's hands (a trick first used by the Taiyo Sphinxes team).
66	"Sprinter Sena!?"; Transliteration: "Supurintā Sena!?" (Japanese: スプリンター·セナ!?)	July 12, 2006	
Ishimaru misses practice because another member of his athletic club injures his knee at a practice and he cannot run for three weeks. Sena offers to send Eyeshield 21 to run in his place but figuring Hiruma will not let him, goes as himself. Sena helps the athletic club reach the finals, where they win first place.
67	"Promise of the Three"; Transliteration: "Sannin no Yakusoku" (Japanese: 三人の約束)	July 19, 2006	
Riku learns that Sena's speed has increased, and also that he is secretly Eyeshield 21. Hiruma confronts Kid and tells him that between Riku and Eyeshield 21, Eyeshield is the fastest running back. He asks who Kid thinks is the strongest quarterback in Kanto. His answer: Yoichi Hiruma.
68	"Fastest Proof"; Transliteration: "Saizoku no Shōmei" (Japanese: 最速の証明)	July 26, 2006	
The game against the Wild Gunmen begins. Doburoku tells the Devil Bats that if they lose concentration for even a second, they will surely lose. Deimon kicks off the ball first and it is received by Riku. He shows the power of his technique, the Rodeo Drive, by running straight to a touchdown. However, when Seibu kicks off to Deimon, Sena returns the favor by doing the same, running a straight touchdown, being stopped by Riku just a second too late.
69	"Field of Desperation"; Transliteration: "Zetsubō no Fīrudo" (Japanese: 絶望のフィールド)	August 9, 2006	
Unable to stop Kid's Quick and Fire technique, the Devil Bats decide to reveal the fruit of their bump training. Seibu counters by bringing in the Iron Horse, Tetsuma. Monta is unable to stop him, and he scores a touchdown, with the extra point successful, making the score 14-6. Hiruma tries to trick Kid into a quick pass by using a Zone Blitz, but he fails and Kid rushes to a touchdown.
70	"Musashi is here" Transliteration: "Musashi wa Koko ni iru" (Japanese: ムサシはここにいる)	August 16, 2006	
The Devil Bats are in desperate need of a kicker, and Musashi is watching the game from his father's hospital room. Without a score before halftime, the Devil Bats have a slim chance of victory, so Hiruma decides to kick the field goal himself. The kick is close, but it hits the side pole and is no good. Using a strategy that relies on nothing more than Kurita's brute force, the Devil Bats get a touchdown, lessening the point gap.
71	"The Devil's Counterattack"; Transliteration: "Hangeki no Akuma" (Japanese: 反撃の悪魔)	August 23, 2006	
Trying to prove to Sena that he is the better player, Riku fumbles the ball. Sena intercepts it and runs straight to a touchdown. With Deimon only down by 2, Seibu gives the ball to Riku. Sena tries to stop him, but Riku gets by him easily, scoring another touchdown for Seibu.
72	"Pride of Speed of Light"; Transliteration: "Kōsoku no Puraido" (Japanese: 光速のプライド)	August 30, 2006	
There are 9 minutes left in the game, and Deimon is behind by 9. They try to make up the difference, but Sena cannot get past Riku. With only 1 minute left, Sena finally gets past Riku's Rodeo Drive and scores a touchdown. Deimon is only behind by 3 points.

=== Episodes 73–145 ===
No.	Title	Original release date	Ref(s).
73	"Fated Kick"; Transliteration: "Unmei no Kikku" (Japanese: 運命のキック)	September 6, 2006	
Kid tells Hiruma that he fell directly into his trap, and that everything is always too good to be true. Hiruma reminds Kid that he told him that Eyeshield would definitely win, and Kid tells Hiruma not to forget that he said Hiruma Youichi is the best quarterback in the league. They part ways, saying that the rest of the battle will be a battle of wits, and Hiruma decides to do an onside kick.
74	"A Pact Between Rivals"; Transliteration: "Raibaru no Chikai" (Japanese: ライバルの誓い)	September 6, 2006	
After losing to the Seibu Gunmen, Tetsuma saves Monta from getting Deimon suspended from playing. Hiruma reveals there is a seat left in the Tokyo Tournament so they still have a chance to be in the Christmas Bowl. Deimon attends a summer festival. Mamori invites Riku. Riku tells Sena to promise to remove his eyeshield mask before the Kanto Tournament.
75	"Spider's Threat"; Transliteration: "Supaidā no Kyōi" (Japanese: スパイダーの脅威)	September 13, 2006	
The Bando Spiders play against the Ojo White Knights. The Spiders are in the lead due to Kotarou's kick. Deimon is stunned that a small Bando player can take down Otawara and the team seems to know Ojo's passing routes. However, in the end, Ojo wins 14 to 3 and are set to play the Wild Gunmen.
76	"Come Back! Musashi!"; Transliteration: "Modore! Musashi!" (Japanese: 戻れ!ムサシ!)	September 20, 2006	
Deimon realizes that they will need a kicker to win their game against the Bando Spiders. Sena and Monta try and convince Musashi to rejoin their team; he reveals that he quit the team to take care of his father and their construction company. In the end, he promises to rejoin once his father recovers.
77	"The Real "21""; Transliteration: "Hontō no "21"" (Japanese: 本当の「21」)	September 27, 2006	
Sena and Suzuna go to retrieve their helmets and cleats at a store where Sena sees a helmet with an eyeshield on it. Akaba is revealed to be the owner of the helmet. Akaba proclaims he will defeat Eyeshield 21 and take the title that be believes rightfully belongs to him.
78	"The One That Waits Previously"; Transliteration: "Sono Sakini Matsumono" (Japanese: その先に待つもの)	October 4, 2006	
Mamori tries to help Sena, and Sena cannot find enough time to change into Eyeshield 21! So after school, he practices by himself by the riverside. After catching a cold because of training in the rain, Sena is forced to stay home during the Ojo vs. Gunmen game. Deciding to go, he manages to get there about halfway through the game, when Riku and Shin are in a showdown, but problems start when Mamori spots him and urges him to go home. Then, shy Sena says the words that Mamori was sure she would never hear: "Leave me alone! I want to be here right now!"
79	"Sena Kobayakawa"; Transliteration: "Kobayakawa Sena" (Japanese: 小早川瀬那)	October 11, 2006	
Before the match, Sena removes his helmet to reveal his identity to the world. Mamori accepts who Sena is. The game against the Bando Spiders begins.
80	"The Strongest Kick Team"; Transliteration: "Saikyō no Kikku Chīmu" (Japanese: 最強のキックチーム)	October 18, 2006	
Using a trick kick in the beginning of the game, Akaba recovers the ball and Kotaro scores a field goal. Things start to look bad for Deimon as they are apparently caught in a loop from the Spider's web, giving Bando a significant lead. Meanwhile, Musashi watches the game from his father's hospital room.
81	"The Truth of Red Pupil"; Transliteration: "Akai Hitomi no Shinjitsu" (Japanese: 赤い瞳の真実)	November 1, 2006	
The game continues to turn in the Spiders' favor, as they score yet another field goal, giving them a 20-point lead.
82	"Run! Musashi!"; Transliteration: "Hashire! Musashi!" (Japanese: 走れ!ムサシ!)	November 8, 2006	
Using a combination run with Hiruma, Sena is finally able to score a touchdown. Meanwhile, at the hospital, Musashi is told by his father to return to the Devil Bats. Encouraged also by his co-workers.
83	"Time that began to move" Transliteration: "Ugoki Dashita Jikan" (Japanese: 動き出した時間)	November 15, 2006	
Musashi arrives just in time and scores a 45-yard field goal, and Deimon is now only behind by eleven points. Towards the end of the episode, a strong wind arises, confusing the players.
84	"The Devil in the Storm"; Transliteration: "Arashi no Naka no Akuma" (Japanese: 嵐の中の悪魔)	November 22, 2006	
With the wind's speed increasing, passing is impossible, and Deimon is left with no other choice but to have Sena run the ball. Making use of Monta's catching abilities, and Hiruma's Devil Bat Laser Bullet, Deimon scores a touchdown.
85	"The Man Who is Loved by God"; Transliteration: "Kami ni Aisareta Otoko" (Japanese: 神に愛された男)	November 29, 2006	
Taki begins to cause problems for the Devil Bats in the critical fourth quarter of their game against the Spiders. Behind by 13 points, Deimon struggles desperately to close the point gap.
86	"Time Up of the Light and Shadow"; Transliteration: "Hikari to Kage no Taimu Appu" (Japanese: 光と影のタイムアップ)	December 6, 2006	
With four minutes left in the game, the score is 36-30, Bando to Deimon. Sena manages to get a touchdown with the continuous use of the Devil Bat Ghost. At 36-36, Deimon scores the last point with a kick.
87	"The Strongest Soldiers in Tokyo!!"; Transliteration: "Tōkyō Saikyō no Senshi-tachi!!" (Japanese: 東京最強の戦士達!!)	December 13, 2006	
Deimon has beaten the Spiders and are going to the Kanto Tournament, where the high-school champs of Kanto face each other to choose who will go to the Christmas Bowl. At the award ceremony, the All-Stars are announced. The defensive players are: Shin (Ojo), Kakei Shun (Poseidon), Habashira Rui (Chameleons), Buffalo Ushijima (Wild Gunmen), and Ootawara (Ojo). The offensive players are: Mizumachi (Poseidon), Yamamoto Onihei (Deers), Kurita (Deimon), Koutaro (Bando Spiders), Tetsuma (Wild Gunmen), Sakuraba (Ojo), Akaba Hayato (Bando Spiders), Kid (Wild Gunmen), Riku (Wild Gunmen) and Sena (Deimon). Shin wins the MVP award.
88	"Deimon's Halftime Show"; Transliteration: "Deimon Hāfutaimu Shō" (Japanese: 泥門ハーフタイムショー)	December 20, 2006	
A "halftime show" of short player-centric stories, interspersed with chibi shorts.
89	"Opening! Cream Puff Cup!!"; Transliteration: "Kaimaku! Shūkurīmu Kappu!!" (Japanese: 開幕!シュークリームカップ!!)	January 4, 2007	
The Cream Puff Tournament is a tournament in America where 4 teams representing different continents face each other. Representing Europe and Russia are the Northern Light Blizzards, Asia is represented by the Deimon Devil Bats, America is represented by the NASA Shuttles, and Africa is represented by the Savanna Survivors. The Blizzards play against the Shuttles and win.
90	"Brand New Trial"; Transliteration: "Aratanaru Shiren" (Japanese: 新たなる試練)	January 10, 2007	
Panther and a couple of the Devil Bats play a street game against a rival neighborhood to help Panther regain his love of football.
91	"Fighting Spirit! Death Climb"; Transliteration: "Tōkon! Desu Kuraimu" (Japanese: 闘魂!デス·クライム)	January 17, 2007	
Sena takes up wrestling in order to try to defeat Ivan's mammoth tackle.
92	"3 Brothers Of Texas Ranch"; Transliteration: "Tekisasu Bokujō no Sankyōdai" (Japanese: テキサス牧場の三兄弟)	January 24, 2007	
The Huh-Huh brothers take on a bull in order to train for the Creme Puff Cup.
93	"Yell Of Friendship"; Transliteration: "Yūjō no Ēru" (Japanese: 友情のエール)	January 31, 2007	
Devil Bats vs. Savanna Survivors. In the end, the Devil Bats easily win. After seeing the Devil Bats practice, Panther, Homer, and the others decide to get Coach Apollo back.
94	"Secret Weapon In Silverly White"; Transliteration: "Hakugin no Himitsu Heiki" (Japanese: 白銀の秘密兵器)	February 7, 2007	
Devil Bats vs Blizzards. Trailing 17-0 after the first half, the Blizzards send in their secret weapon to injure Sena. Meanwhile, the NASA Shuttles try to convince Coach Apollo to return to the team.
95	"Break down the Wall of Blizzard"; Transliteration: "Fubuki no Kabe o Buchiyabure" (Japanese: 吹雪の壁をぶちやぶれ)	February 14, 2007	
0-17 Blizzard to Deimon. Ivan's twin brother Wan has been placed on the field with current goals. They perform Snowstorm Tackle and knock Sena unconscious. The Blizzard gains 21 points and have the lead now. Deimon begins to lose faith in each other until Hiruma tells them they must do their best. They manage to stop the other team from scoring any more goals and Sena regains consciousness. Sena manages to beat the Snowstorm Tackle this time and gets a touchdown, winning the game 21-24.
96	"Now! To the Kanto Meet!"; Transliteration: "Iza! Kantō Taikai e!" (Japanese: いざ!関東大会へ!)	February 21, 2007	
Recap of the Fall Tournament
97	"Farewell, Onihei"; Transliteration: "Saraba Onihei" (Japanese: さらば鬼兵)	February 28, 2007	
The challenge to the Death Game has started. The first team to play against are the Hashiratani Deers. Kurita must face up to defeat his longtime hero Onihei.
98	"Chameleon's Counterattack!"; Transliteration: "Kamereon no Gyakushū!" (Japanese: カメレオンの逆襲!)	March 7, 2007	
Game 2 of the Death Game. Zokugaku vs Deimon. Using only 1st year students, Deimon tries to beat the Chameleons.
99	"Deimon High School Festival!!"; Transliteration: "Deimon Kōkō Gakuen-sai dā!!" (Japanese: 泥門高校学園祭だァ!!)	March 21, 2007	
Deimon has a school festival, where a large contest is being held. Everyone decides not to participate, since Hiruma will probably win, but now, it turns out Hiruma is not playing. The team divides into groups of three (Sena, Suzuna, and Omosadake; Monta, Mamori, and Kurita; Kuroki, and two cheerleaders; Ishimaru, Yukimitsu, and Komusubi; Togano, Musashi, and Taki; Jumonji and the team mascots). Each tries to outdo the others, but at the same time, for the very first time, Sena's enjoying the festival, where he's not treated like a gofer anymore.
100	"The Invisible Lock"; Transliteration: "Mienai Kusari" (Japanese: 見えない鎖)	March 28, 2007	
Sena starts to have nightmares about football. Hiruma gives the team a break to rest up. Riku invites Sena to watch the Ojo White Knights train. Shin and Sakuraba are training in the forest and Sena and Riku go after them. Everyone in the team goes to practice, leaving Sena in the woods. Sena gets lost and is saved from a bear by Shin. Shin tells Sena he is experiencing pressure from feeling he must win the game and that he should relieve it by practicing to gain confidence in his skills. Sena is able to relax now.
101	"Strongest Evil"; Transliteration: "Saikyō no Aku" (Japanese: 最強の悪)	April 11, 2007	
The regional champions go to a place where they decide which regional teams will play against who for the Christmas Bowl. Deimon is placed against Shinryuji. Poseidon challenges Shinryuji and Shinryuji wins. Agon comes after the match is over and calls the Poseidon team rubbish. Mizumachi tries to hit Agon but gets his shoulder dislocated by him.
102	"Overcome Your Fears"; Transliteration: "Osore o Koete" (Japanese: 怖れを越えて)	April 18, 2007	
Sena, Monta, and Suzuna visit Mizumachi in the hospital. When Mizumachi overhears how he could not beat Agon, he goes missing. Sena finds him crying and they talk. Mizu says he's afraid of Agon and Sena says he is too but he loves American football so he will continue to play it. Mizu realizes he's become afraid of football and decides to play a game with Sena to overcome it.
103	"The Iron Wall Double Stopper"; Transliteration: "Teppeki no Daburu Sutoppa" (Japanese: 鉄壁のダブルストッパー)	April 25, 2007	
Kyoshin and Bando team up to beat Deimon in the 3rd death game. Monta tries to prove to Kakei that he is a catching master and Sena tries to overcome the double-blocker by Kakei and Akaba.
104	"One Line Lacking"; Transliteration: "Hitotsu Kaketa Rain" (Japanese: 一つ欠けたライン)	May 2, 2007	
In the fourth death game against the Taiyo Spinx, Deimon is left short-handed after Jumonji gets arrested for beating up some punks who were harassing a young girl. The Sphinx declare that they too will forego going to the Kanto Tournament if they lose to Deimon; however, the game ends in a 7-7 tie after Jumonji makes a last-minute comeback, completing Deimon's line and opening up a hole for Sena to score a touchdown.
105	"The Final Death Game"; Transliteration: "Saigo no Desu Gēmu" (Japanese: 最後のデス·ゲーム)	May 9, 2007	
Deimon vs. the NASA Aliens. They use their death climb training in the game, ending with a score of 77-84!
106	"Fieresome God, Agon Kongo"; Transliteration: "Kishin Kongō Agon" (Japanese: 鬼神·金剛阿含)	May 16, 2007	
An interview with Hiruma and Agon. Later, Sena protects Mamori from Agon.
107	"The Enemy is Shinryuji"; Transliteration: "Teki wa Shinryūji ni ari" (Japanese: 敵は神龍寺にあり)	May 30, 2007	
A backstory of Hiruma, Kurita and Musashi who dreams to be part of the Shinryuji Football Team but Agon interferes.
108	"Detective Sena!?"; Transliteration: "Meitantei Sena!?" (Japanese: 名探偵セナ!?)	June 6, 2007	
The Devil Bats are given a night cruise on a ship to relax before the game. When dinner time comes, it turns out someone has eaten their dinner. Sena is put in charge of finding out who did it. Then a blackout occurs; when power is restored, Mamori's briefcase is missing and Monta has been kidnapped. Sena sees someone running and chases after that person. It turns out that was Shin and the Ojo White knights are also on the boat. The food was eaten by Otawara, Shin caused the blackout, the briefcase was never missing, and Monta was mistaken for a circus monkey and placed in a cage.
109	"Talent of Catching"; Transliteration: "KYACHI no sainou" (Japanese: キャッチの才能)	June 13, 2007	
Monta battles Ikkyu in a catching battle. Monta loses but vows to beat Ikkyu next time with 100% effort.
110	"Barrier of Talent"; Transliteration: "Sainō no Kabe" (Japanese: 才能の壁)	June 20, 2007	
Unsei explains to Sena and the others why he trains so hard. It is to keep Agon, his younger brother, from risking his career of being a football player by causing trouble with assaults and fights. His goal in life is for Agon to be the #1 football player.
111	"Go Forth, Devil Bats!"; Transliteration: "Shutsujin! Debiru Battsu!" (Japanese: 出陣!デビルバッツ!)	June 27, 2007	
Finally, the match with Shinryuji draws near. Doburoku tells Yukimistu that he will participate in this game, much to the team's delight. At Shinryuji, their coach shows them information that they have on the Devil Bats on a waterfall and projection screen, when Agon arrives (with two girls in tow) and says he will crush them all, Hiruma especially. Sena's face appears on the screen, and Agon suddenly throws one of the underclassmen into the waterfall, adding "And that piece of trash too." At that moment, Sena shudders because he suddenly has a bad feeling. Later that night, Suzuna texts Sena, asking him if he is afraid. Sena (thoroughly peeved) texts back that he's not scared, he just cannot believe that this is all happening. Suzuna asks him if this is his goal, to which Sena replies "No, I want to go to the Christmas Bowl, so we will win, I promise!" With that said, Suzuna smiles in her sleep, saying that she will be behind him, every step of the way.
112	"Devil vs God!"; Transliteration: "Akuma vs Kishin!" (Japanese: 悪魔vs鬼神!)	July 4, 2007	
The game begins. Shinryuji gets the lead on Deimon. Agon proves to be unstoppable, even for Hiruma. Agon and Unui show their best technique because of Hiruma's provocation. The Dragonfly is a move where Agon or Unsui is the quarterback and they pass to each other with an overhead throw. This confuses the opponent as to who has the ball.
113	"The Twelfth Athlete"; Transliteration: "12 Ninme no Asurīto" (Japanese: 12人目のアスリート)	July 11, 2007	
The first half ends with 32-0, Shinryuji in the lead. The second half begins after Hiruma tells the team to give up and try and not get injured. The team understands he means they should get rough, meaning that Musashi will kick the ball to the outfield. They catch the ball and Yukimatsu joins in for the next play. Yukimitsu knows where Hiruma will throw the ball; this move is called Option route, where Hiruma chooses the best place to throw the ball. Yukimitsu catches it and gets Deimon their first touchdown.
114	"Mediocre Power"; Transliteration: "Bonsai no Chikara" (Japanese: 凡才の力)	July 18, 2007	
Hiruma tells Sena that he has to blitz Agon on every play, but it just does not seem to work. Once, while Agon is about to pass the ball, he says that they are getting a "game over," which makes Sena suddenly furious, to the point where he forgets he is in a game and jumps to attack Agon, who dodges, but is slightly disturbed. After a while, Shinryuji goes with a run, which in reality is a trap. Sanzo back passes to Agon just as Sena rushes up. Because of Sena's intense concentration on Agon, Sena somehow sees the football, even though it is in his blind spot, and knocks it away with a superhuman jump to the side. Everybody goes for the ball, and Jumonji manages to get it, thanks to Kurita. As he runs with the ball, Agon catches up and stops him. Jumonji, realizing what Sena had to go through, takes one more step and crosses the goal line. It seems that everything will be all right, but then Sena's legs start to have problems, and Doburoku cools them down with an ice pack. In the meantime, Unsui notices that Agon has acknowledged Sena as a rival, and thinks that it is great. An intense rivalry aura develops between Agon and Sena, and Shin once again notes that Sena will be improving to no limits.
115	"Fighting to be Number One"; Transliteration: "Nanbā Wan o Kakete" (Japanese: ナンバーワンを懸けて)	July 25, 2007	
At the beginning of the episode Shin comments that even though each individual in Deimon is lacking, as a team they are already regarded as the strongest in Kanto, hinting the result of the game. This episode centers around Monta's individual battle with Ikkyu. Monta wins Ikyu in an aerial battle by snatching the ball away from him in mid-air, and scores a touchdown by successfully catching a long pass. Ikkyu finally admits Monta as a rival but still states that the 'Number One' in Kanto is still himself. Monta's successful touchdown brought back a momentum to the Devil Bats. Near the end of the episode Agon shows his true strength by imitating Sena's Devil Bat Ghost and passing Sena with it, proving the reign of natural physical talent such as himself as compared to the Sena who had completed the move by intensive training. Sena's knee starts hurting after he used Devil Bat Ghost too many times and caused an 'act' incident between Hiruma and Musashi about the future of a sports player. In the next play, Eyeshield 21 intercepts Unsui's 'Tranquil Reflections' by abandoning the post of defending the prodigy, Agon.
116	"The Will of a Warrior"; Transliteration: "Senshi no ishi" (Japanese: 戦士の意志)	August 8, 2007	
Sena grabs the ball and is about to score a touchdown when Agon gets in the way. Agon is about to strike down Sena, but when Agon suddenly insults the Devil Bats' dreams of going to the Christmas Bowl, Sena's newfound fury gets the best of him, and he tries to attack Agon. Agon chops Sena's arm away, and then tries to stop Sena, who uses the Devil Bat Ghost to get away. Agon chases after Sena, who suddenly realizes that the God Speed Impulse will not work on something Agon cannot see, so he pushes down on Agon's helmet in his blind spot. Sena actually slams Agon's head into the ground and scores a touchdown, making the score 35-28.
117	"Time Out Zero"; Transliteration: "Taimu Auto Zero" (Japanese: タイムアウト·ゼロ)	August 22, 2007	
58 seconds remain with the score at 35-28. Shinryuji leading the Deimon Bats. Deimon must score a touchdown in those 58 seconds to win. After gaining a short number of yards and spiking to stop the clock, Hiruma pulls a long pass to Monta. Monta catches it and with 4 seconds to go, is tackled by Agon 20 yards from the goal. The timer becomes zero and Deimon loses.
118	"Huddle Without Answers"; Transliteration: "Kotae Naki Hadoru" (Japanese: 答えなきハドル)	August 29, 2007	
It turns out that before Monta was tackled down, he reached his hand out and grabbed the grass on the "out of bounds area," stopping the clock and regaining those 4 seconds. Within those 4 seconds, Hiruma distracts the other team by causing an uproar in the audience. When it looks like Hiruma is getting the crowd worked up this sets him in motion and the ball is directly snapped to Sena. He runs it but gets covered by Agon. Sena then tosses the ball in the air and Hiruma catches it and scores by running it past Agon. The score is now 35 to 34. Touchdowns are worth 2 points now and kicks are worth one. With no chance to win in a tiebreaker, they must score a touchdown on the last play. Hiruma takes the ball and runs towards the Shinryuji defense line. He throws the ball in the air and Sena catches it and scores a touchdown, which wins the game 35 to 36.
119	"To the Limits of the Death Battle"; Transliteration: "Shito no Hateni" (Japanese: 死闘の果てに)	September 5, 2007	
After winning the game, the players line up to shake hands. Agon refuses to believe he lost and is about to attack Hiruma but Unsei punches Agon and takes the blame for their team's loss. Agon calms down and says they will beat Deimon next spring. Deimon celebrate their victory with a party while Hiruma sleeps after he is exhausted from the game.
120	"Super Dreadnaught! Dinosaurs!!"; Transliteration: "Chō Dokyū! Dainasōzu!!" (Japanese: 超弩級!ダイナソーズ!!)	September 12, 2007	
The Hakushu Dinosaurs are going to play the Taiyo Sphinx. Deimon comes to the stadium to watch the match. At the entrance Maruko introduces their star player, Gaou, to the Sphinx and says the Sphinx will lose. In the match the Sphinx take the lead in the game 0-21 until Gao joins from the benches, when it ends at 28-21 with every player on the Sphinx team injured and they are forced to forfeit.
121	"Battlefield of the Wolves"; Transliteration: "Ookami no senjou" (Japanese: 狼の戦場)	September 19, 2007	
Seibu Wild Gunmen vs. Misaki Wolves! Before the game, the Wolves' long-legged Kamiya Taiga taunts Riku by challenging Sena as his rival. It turns out he's not all talk, and as a result, Riku loses his cool. Could this mean elimination for Seibu?
122	"Rodeo Drive Stampede"; Transliteration: "Rodeo Doraibu Sutanpīdo" (Japanese: ロデオドライブ·スタンピード)	September 26, 2007	
Riku loses his cool and gets angry at the Wolves. This puts the whole team into frustration. Reassured by his teammates (including a very sick Tetsuma with a cold), Riku regains his calm and returns to the field with the debut of his perfected technique: Rodeo Drive Stampede! The game ends with 21-48, victory for the Gunmen.
123	"The Knight with No Weakness"; Transliteration: "Shikakunaki Kishi" (Japanese: 死角なき騎士)	October 3, 2007	
As a celebration of their progress, Mamori decides to buy Sena and Riku new shoes. On his way to meet them, Riku runs into Shin, who demands to be taught the running technique behind Rodeo Drive.
124	"Ultimate Spear!!"; Transliteration: "Kyūkyoku no yari!!" (Japanese: 究極の槍!!)	October 17, 2007	
Ojo White Knights vs. Sado Strong Golems! The rock-hard bodies of the Golems seem to present Ojo with a problem, but Shin reveals the "completed" version of Spear Tackle, the Trident Tackle. Ojo wins 42-0. In the end Hiruma's father calls him and says he waited for Hiruma at their meeting place but he did not come. His father says he is sorry he cannot see Hiruma at the Christmas Bowl as he has to leave Japan. Before he finishes talking, Hiruma hangs up and throws his cellphone away with his face hidden from the camera.
125	"White Knights High School Festival!!"; Transliteration: "Ōjō Kōkō Gakuen-sai dā!!" (Japanese: 王城高校学園祭だァ!!)	October 24, 2007	
Hiruma and the rest of the team go to spy on Ojo at their high school festival to find out about the ballista, but all of the other teammates except Hiruma, Kurita, and Musashi get caught up in the festival, namely a quiz show.
126	"Promise to Become an Ace"; Transliteration: "Ēsu e no Chikai" (Japanese: エースへの誓い)	October 31, 2007	
Torakichi realizes that Sakuraba's not the ace of Ojo. He sulks at a river until Sena and the others cheer him up. He returns and talks to Sakuraba, who says he will not be the ace until he is better than Shin and that's why he trains so much. The kid offers him a wristband that he asks Sakuraba to wear in the game against Deimon.
127	"Just for Victory"; Transliteration: "Tada, Shōri no Tame ni" (Japanese: ただ、勝利のために)	November 7, 2007	
Three days before the game between Deimon and Ojo, Hiruma takes the team on a helicopter to make them remember the lines where the defense of Ojo Knights are weakest. The coach makes the team wear masks that greatly reduce their oxygen intake, which will greatly increase their lung intake for one day. The coaches of Deimon and Ojo meet on the field where the game will take place and pour wine onto the grass so the heavens may help the losers of the match "recover" quicker.
128	"Devil vs. Man with the Speed of Light"; Transliteration: "Akuma vs. Kōsoku no Otoko" (Japanese: 悪魔vs光速の男)	November 14, 2007	
The two teams' catchers and running backs are interviewed the day before the match. Ojo's coach increases the difficulty of their training and 20 spare teams of Ojo quit due to it. Hiruma trains his pass and has a 96% accuracy. Sena trains with Hiruma and learns that his runs are too simple and that there is a fraction of a second where he stops when he does the Devil Bat Ghost.
129	"A Challenge to the King"; Transliteration: "Ōja e no Chōsen" (Japanese: 王者への挑戦)	November 21, 2007	
The day has come for the Ojo White Knights and Deimon Devil Bats to face each other. It is raining hard and the Deimon will start the attack. Finally Ikari will play in the game as his debut game; he is so pumped that he breaks a chain with brute strength. Sakuraba is utterly serious about taking the title of ace from Shin.
130	"Fanfare Start"; Transliteration: "Kaisen no Fanfāre" (Japanese: 開戦のファンファーレ)	November 28, 2007	
The battle between Ojo and Deimon has started, and Deimon gets to attack first. Hiruma made a strategy to help Sena catch the ball from the kick off. Sena catches the ball then runs straight for a touchdown, but Ojo's line blocks his way. Deimon's line defends Sena but fails. On the second try Sena succeeds in going through but Otawara blocks his way. On the third try, Deimon creates a strategy to defeat Ojo's line and Sena uses his Ghost against Otawara. Then he comes up against Shin but fails to pass using Devil Bat Ghost and gets hit by the Rodeo Drive + Spear tackle or the Trident Tackle.
131	"Prison Chain of Wrath"; Transliteration: "Ikari no Purizun Chēn" (Japanese: 怒りのプリズンチェーン)	December 5, 2007	
Ikari makes his debut play. He uses Prison Chain on Sena and blows him off the field, but he continues to attack Sena even when the referee blows his whistle. Jumonji defends Sena and gains a bruise on the arm. Ikari is assigned to come against Jumonji but he becomes scared every time it happens. It appears he had an experience with Ikari in middle school. He is encouraged by his father, which helps him defeat Ikari and Deimon makes their first down.
132	"The Knight who Commands the Sky"; Transliteration: "Sora o Seisuru Kishi" (Japanese: 空を制する騎士)	December 12, 2007	
Monta catches all the passes of Hiruma. The Ojo Knights are in a tight spot. Sakuraba asks if he can play, but he is denied because he is supposed to be the key in the second half. Hiruma decides to use the Shotgun Formation of the Gunmen against Ojo. After a play with Monta against a tall Ojo player (where Monta succeeds), Sakuraba with the help of Shin finally gets his coach's permission to join the defense. He starts to intercept and block Monta's catches.
133	"Ballista of the Kingdom"; Transliteration: "Ōkoku no Barisuta" (Japanese: 王国の巨大弓)	December 19, 2007	
The Bats are on their fourth down and 40 yards away from the goal. Musashi kicks the ball. It hits the goal and goes in. Now Ojo is on the offensive. Four Eyes (Takami) says that they will break through in front. Using Ballista, Shin runs in the opposite direction then breaks through the line (this include Kurita). Ojo gains their 1st down.
134	"Invincible Barrier"; Transliteration: "Muteki no Jōsai" (Japanese: 無敵の城塞)	January 4, 2008	
Takami once again tells Deimon which direction he will running The Ballista. Hiruma suspects that this is not the usual Takami but cannot seem to figure it out. The play beings and as said Shin runs to right. All defenders run to cover him but Takami then runs to the left for a QB SNEAK! As Deimons defenders run to intercept him he then passes an Everest Pass so high that the whole stadium thought Sakuraba would not be able to catch. As Monta tries to catch up Sakuraba stands by the end zone waiting for the ball but then Hiruma shows up and blocks Sakuraba! As Monta catches up the ball thens suddenly turns towards the out-of-bounds area. Still, Sakuraba jumps for the ball and catches it and tips a toe in the endzone for a touchdown. They go for a kick but Kurita, (who's been secretly squatting for the whole season) jumps to block the kick! 6-3 Ojo 6, Deimon 3.
135	"Peerless Superman"; Transliteration: "Hirui Naki Chōjin" (Japanese: 比類なき超人)	January 9, 2008	
Shin stops the passing game of Deimon forcing them to use Sena. Sena tries to pass Shin with the Devilbat Ghost, but Shin simply turns around to stop him with the Trident Tackle. However Shin says there battle is not over, as Sena’s speed was not maxed out. Sena does another run and uses the Devil Light Hurricane (using opponents strength to push himself past), named by Hiruma, to pass by Shin on their third one-on-one. But Shin catches up right away and stops Sena, now also being equal in speed.
136	""21" Defeated"; Transliteration: "Haiboku no "21"" (Japanese: 敗北の「21」)	January 16, 2008	
Having achieved the speed of light as well, Shin declares himself the winner off the battle between him and Sena. On Sena’s next run he loses the ball and Shin makes a touchdown making the score 13-3. After not being able to get a 1st down and with no way to stop Shin, Hiruma makes Mamori edit a video of Shin’s match and tells everyone not to let Ojo get another point till half time. While Sena spaces out the rest of the Devilbats manages to get the ball back and Musashi makes a field-goal just before halftime making it 13-6 for Ojo. Hiruma tells Sena not wuss-out as there is no one who is unbeatable.
137	"Half Time of Fate"; Transliteration: "Unmei no Hāfutaimu" (Japanese: 運命のハーフタイム)	January 23, 2008	
Hiruma and Mamori go through the games footage to find a strategy. Meanwhile in Ojo’s locker-room, Shin says a 7-point gap is not enough as Eyeshield 21 is a player that improves with shocking speed during a game. As Suzuna motivates Sena, Hiruma finds a way to defeat Shin. He tells Sena to push Shin away using his arm strength. Right before the second half the sun comes out. After which Hiruma comments that if they get through the first 10 minutes the rhythm of the match will turn in their favor.
138	"Ground Battle After the Rain"; Transliteration: "Ame Agari no Chijō-sen" (Japanese: 雨あがりの地上戦)	January 30, 2008	
Sena uses a speed-boost to compete in power with Shin (playing leadblock,) who knocks him away with some effort, giving Hiruma the chance to tackle the runner. However, the speed-boost and many Devilbat Ghosts in the first half, end up being to big a burden on Sena’s legs and the give out on the next play. Hiruma tells him to keep playing but not run anymore, giving him chance to rest his legs. Everyone is now so focused on stopping Shin that it is obvious to Ichiro Takami, but Hiruma does not stop them from going after Shin. Takami uses the Everest Pass but it turns out that Monta was still focused at Sakuraba. Knowing he cannot make it if he looks back at the ball, Monta jumps up without looking.
139	"The 9999th Catch"; Transliteration: "9999 Kai no Kyacchi" (Japanese: 9999回のキャッチ)	February 6, 2008	
The episode starts off with Ojo throwing a long pass. Monta intercepts it without turning around to watch the ball. Hiruma points out that Monta no longer needs to see where the ball's heading and dubs Monta's move Devil Backfire. Deimon's ball, Hiruma throws long overhead passes and Monta uses the Devil Backfire to catch it. After 5 minutes, the field dries and Sena is able to run at full speed again. Sena grabs on to Monta when he catches a ball and uses the Devil Hurricane for a touchdown.
140	"Two Aces"; Transliteration: "Futari no Ēsu" (Japanese: 二人のエース)	February 13, 2008	
Sakuraba attempts the Devil Backfire but failes and makes a nasty fall losing consciousness. He has backflashes and loses confidence. But as he wakes to Torakichi (wheelchair kid) and sees him struggle to stand up for the first time since his hospitalization, Sakuraba returns to the field with renewed spirit. He suggests to use a new comby play with Shin named Sagittarius (Sakuraba gets a short pass and Shin blocks the defense going to tackle him). After several Sagittarius’s a driven Sakuraba makes a touchdown, the score is now 20-13. The episode ends with Agon Kongo showing up in the tribunes.
141	"Devil Stun Gun Initiated!"; Transliteration: "Debiru Sutan Gan Hatsudō!" (Japanese: デビルスタンガン発動!)	February 20, 2008	
Score is 20-13, Ojo to Deimon. Deimon's ball. When Shin tries to tackle Hiruma, Sena learns how to block the Trident Spear with a new move dubbed by Hiruma the Devil Stun Gun, which is a move to knock the opponent down or knock his arm away. Sena uses it and runs towards the end zone with Shin right behind him. They both run the same speed so it would be impossible to catch up to Sena. Shin jumps towards Sena and manages to get a finger in Sena's shoe, causing him to trip. Sena tries to make the ball touch the endzone but is knocked away by Sakuraba. The ball belongs to Ojo now.
142	"Devil's Wings"; Transliteration: "Akuma no Ryōyoku" (Japanese: 悪魔の両翼)	February 27, 2008	
Deimon makes a safety, making the score 20-15 and getting the ball back. Yukimitsu collapses having played longer than ever and Monta's endurance is also shown to have run out. Sena tells him he will pass Shin. To get past him, Sena uses the Devilbat Hurricane right away followed by the Devil Stun Gun. It turns out not to not be enough and Sena lets go of the ball. As Sakuraba tries to catch the ball, Monta comes after him and pushes him out of bounds, keeping possession on Deimon's side. Having used the last of his energy and is about to collapse, Monta is caught by his hero, Honjo-san (old baseball player). With his hero telling him not to give up until the end, Monta is once again fired up.
143	"A Deep Attachment"; Transliteration: "Shūnen Hitotsu" (Japanese: 執念ひとつ)	March 5, 2008	
3 yards till the goal line and 1:21 minute left. Sena goes for a Devilbat Dive as Monta goes for a catch pose, leaving the choice to Hiruma. With the first two attempts Sena gets stopped 1 cm from the goalline by Shin. Deimon’s last down and with the same setup Sena tries to make a pass to Monta as he does a high dive, but Shin causes a bad pass. Sakuraba has the advantage with his position but Monta makes a one-handed catch! Score 20-22 and less than a minute left as Ojo is coming up the field fast. Ishimaru (trackteam) gets injured and Hiruma struggles with whom to replace him with, until he sees the look in the exhausted Yukimitsu’s eyes. With only 10 seconds left Shin goes on a bulldozing run. Two of the Ha-Ha brothers with the help of Yukimitsu finally take him down, but it is unclear if it is a touchdown or not.
144	"The Last Moment"; Transliteration: "Saigo no Setsuna" (Japanese: 最後の刹那)	March 12, 2008	
Shin successfully made the final touchdown for White Knights, making the score 27-22 to the White Knights. When all is lost, it was revealed that Yukimitsu gained one last second for the Devil Bats by pushing Shin into the end zone. This means that the Devil Bats have to steal the Ball from the White Knights and score a touchdown - all in one go; if Sena gets tackled, then all is over. The play starts and all is well until Monta gets the ball and is surrounded by some White Knights. Hiruma calculates their chances (0%) if he cannot get Sena to go near Monta & receive the ball or if Monta can pass the ball to Sena(which is impossible with Monta's lack of passing skills). Then Sena breezes past Hiruma which gives Hiruma an idea. He shouts at the nearby boys to gather with Monta. Hiruma, Monta, Sena and Taki gather in a tight midfield huddle and then break out of the huddle in different directions, confusing the White Knights and Takami. Eyeshield 21 is shown with the ball while surpassing all opponents except Shin. The episode ends in freeze-frame showing Sena and Shin charging towards each other. The omake shows a young Sena learning how to run with Riku. Shin suddenly breezes past Sena to give a man who dropped a coin from his car a few blocks back his money. Both Sena and Shin get a strange sense of premonition and stare at each other from across the street.
145	"Everybody, Let's Play American Football!"; Transliteration: "Minna Amefuto Yarouze!" (Japanese: みんなアメフトやろうぜ!)	March 19, 2008	
The final play comes down to Sena against Shin one on one. Shin's power and speed stopped Sena many times before. With time running short, Sena has the ball and runs to the endzone and Shin charges him head-on. Sena manages to get through Shin but he catches up and manages to knock Sena down with two fingers. Sena manages to get one hand on the ground to bounce back up. With the Devil Bat Dive running at 4.2 seconds, Sena uses Shin's Trident Tackle to go 4.1 seconds and gets the touchdown that wins the game. The next match will be Deimon against the Dinosaurs and the winner will go to the Christmas Bowl. Eight to nine years later, Sena is on a team with colors of grayish purple with a yellow lightning bolt. On getting the touchdown in the first few seconds Sena notices Hiruma on the opposite team. The series ends with Hiruma shouting "Everyone! Let's play American Football! Ya-Ha!"

== OVAs ==
No.	Title	Original release date	Ref(s).
1	"The Phantom Golden Bowl"; Transliteration: "Maboroshi no Gōruden Bouru" (Japanese: アイシールド21 幻のゴールデンボウル)	September 2003	
The mayor of Tokyo sees his alma team Uraharajuku Boarders has failed to reach the Kanto tournament, but then he gets a call from Mutto who is the new member in the sport counsel of the city to put his team in a match with Deimon which who is weak team and if they win they can play in the tournament. In the first half Uraharajuku Boarders was leading 14-0, but the Deimon Devilbats proved that they will not give up so they ignore the fear of the asphalt & fought the Uraharajuku Boarders until they annihilated them by 54-14.
2	"Road to the Christmas Bowl ~ Special training on the southern island ! Ya-Ha-!"; Transliteration: "Kurisumasu Bouru e no Michi ~ Minami no Shima de Tokkun da! Ya-Ha!" (Japanese: クリスマスボウルへの道～南の島で特訓だ! YA-HA!)	2005	
Hiruma takes the Devil Bats to Okinawa, where they play a match. After the match, Hiruma takes Sena, Kurita, Monta, Mamori, Yukimitsu, and Komusubi to an island, saying that they will have barbecue but leaves them there and tells them to survive and that this is a test for the Christmas Bowl.

== Media release ==
=== Japanese release ===
Bandai Visual released thirty-six DVD compilations between July 22, 2005, and June 25, 2008.

Volume	Release date	Episodes	Ref.
Volume 1	July 22, 2005	1–4	
Volume 2	August 26, 2005	5–8	
Volume 3	September 23, 2005	9–12	
Volume 4	October 28, 2005	13–16	
Volume 5	November 25, 2005	17–20	
Volume 6	December 23, 2005	21–24 + OVA	
Volume 7	January 27, 2006	25–28	
Volume 8	February 24, 2006	29–32	
Volume 9	March 24, 2006	33–36	
Volume 10	April 26, 2006	37–40	
Volume 11	May 26, 2006	41–44	
Volume 12	June 23, 2006	45–48	
Volume 13	July 28, 2006	49–52	
Volume 14	August 25, 2006	53–56	
Volume 15	September 22, 2006	57–60	
Volume 16	October 27, 2006	61–64	
Volume 17	November 24, 2006	65–68	
Volume 18	December 22, 2006	69–72	
Volume 19	January 26, 2007	73–76	
Volume 20	February 23, 2007	77–80	
Volume 21	March 23, 2007	81–84	
Volume 22	April 25, 2007	85–88	
Volume 23	May 25, 2007	89–92	
Volume 24	June 22, 2007	93–96	
Volume 25	July 27, 2007	97–100	
Volume 26	August 24, 2007	101–104	
Volume 27	September 25, 2007	105–108	
Volume 28	October 26, 2007	109–112	
Volume 29	November 23, 2007	113–116	
Volume 30	December 21, 2007	117–120	
Volume 31	January 25, 2008	121–124	
Volume 32	February 22, 2008	125–128	
Volume 33	March 25, 2008	129–132	
Volume 34	April 25, 2008	133–136	
Volume 35	May 23, 2008	137–140	
Volume 36	June 25, 2008	140–145	

=== English release ===
Sentai Filmworks released four DVD compilations between May 18, 2010, and February 8, 2011.

Sentai Filmworks (North America, Region 1 DVD)
Volume	Episodes	Release date	Ref.
Volume 1	1–13	May 18, 2010	
Volume 2	14–26	July 6, 2010	
Volume 3	27–39	December 21, 2010	
Volume 4	40–52	February 8, 2011	
