= Lee Tae-sung =

South Korean actor (born 1985)

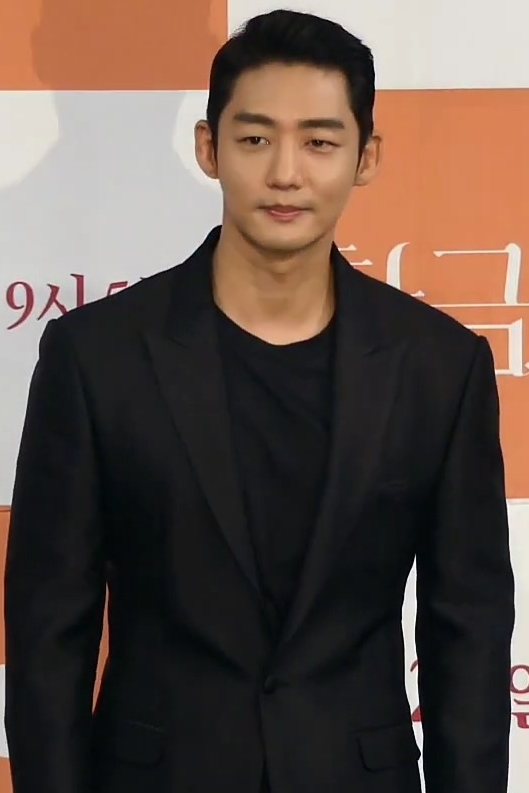
- Lee in 2019
- Born: Lee Sung-deok; April 21, 1985 (age 41); Ansan, South Korea
- Other name: イ･テソン (Japanese)
- Occupations: Actor; painter
- Years active: 2003–present
- Agent: Cheon Company
- Height: 1.83 m (6 ft 0 in)
- Spouse: Unknown (m. 2013; div. 2015)
- Children: 1

Korean name
- Hangul: 이성덕
- RR: I Seongdeok
- MR: I Sŏngdŏk

Stage name
- Hangul: 이태성
- Hanja: 李太成
- RR: I Taeseong
- MR: I T'aesŏng

Lee Tae-sung (Korean: 이태성; born April 21, 1985), birth name Lee Sung-deok, is a South Korean actor. He is known for his roles in 26 Years Diary, Playful Kiss, Rooftop Prince, and My Golden Life and is currently a cast member of the reality show My Little Old Boy.

== Early life ==
The elder of two sons, Lee was born and raised in Ansan, Gyeonggi Province. His younger brother is singer Sung Yu-bin (Korean: 성유빈, born 1987), who is a member of the band BOB4. Lee was a baseball player in his youth and had aspired to play professionally before constant injuries forced him to give up the sport during his senior year. He graduated from Ansan Technical High School where he was schoolmates with St. Louis Cardinals pitcher Kim Kwang-hyun.

== Career ==
Lee's first credited role was as baseball player Koo Chun-seo in the sports film Superstar Mr. Gam. He was cast in his first lead role in the 2005 film Blossom Again opposite veteran actress Kim Jung-eun and was nominated for Best New Actor at the Blue Dragon Film Awards and Baeksang Arts Awards. His next film was the 2006 Japanese-South Korean co-production 26 Years Diary, in which he portrayed the Korean student who was killed trying to save a man who had fallen off the platform at the Shin-Ōkubo Station. It garnered him much attention in Japan due to the high profile nature of the actual incident, which had occurred in 2001. He was cast in the second male lead role in the romantic comedy Two Outs in the Ninth Inning, in which he played a college baseball player aspiring to go professional. After a stint of playing mostly protagonist roles, he portrayed the villainous nemesis of Park Yoo-chun in the sageuk fusion drama Rooftop Prince followed by the scheming son of a chaebol family in Pots of Gold.

Following his discharge from the military in July 2015, Lee's comeback project was the MBC weekend drama My Mom. He then starred in the KBS drama My Golden Life, which began airing in late 2017 and became a ratings hit domestically.

In April 2020, Lee and his mother joined the cast of the reality show My Little Old Boy.

In December 2021, Lee released his first solo exhibition 'Lee Motion' and made his debut as a painter.

In June 2022, Lee will hold a second art exhibition, starting from June 21, 2022, until July 20.

== Personal life ==
=== Baseball ===
Lee played for the celebrity amateur baseball team Playboys, alongside the likes of fellow actors Kim Seung-woo and Yoon Hyun-min.

=== Relationship and family ===
Lee secretly registered his marriage in April 2012 to his non-celebrity girlfriend. The couple have a son who was born in 2011, a day before the death of his paternal grandmother. They separated before he enlisted for his military service and eventually divorced after three years of marriage. He has primary custody of their son.

=== Military service ===
Lee entered his mandatory military service on October 29, 2013 at 32nd Division training camp in Gongju, South Chungcheong Province. As he was a single father, he was granted reservist status, which meant that he could commute to his duty station from home after the five weeks of basic military training. He was discharged in July 2015.

== Filmography ==
=== Film ===
Year	Title	Role	Notes/Ref.
2004	Superstar Mr. Gam	Stunt double; Koo Cheon-seo (OB Bears)	Credited as Lee Seong-deok (이성덕)
2005	Blossom Again	Lee Seok / Lee Soo	
2006	26 Years Diary	Lee Soo-hyun	
2006	Gangster High	Kim Jae-gu	
2010	Sera & Lami	Kwang-soo	
2022	Jajangmyeon Thank you		Shorts Film

=== Television series ===
Year	Title	Role	Notes/Ref.
2003	Go Mom Go!		
2007	Several Questions That Make Us Happy	Jung-wook	
2007	Two Outs in the Ninth Inning	Kim Jung-joo	
2007	Time Between Dog and Wolf	Bae Sang-shik	
2008	Terroir	Park Dan-byul	
2009	Romance Zero	Kim Woo-jin	
2009	Enjoy Life	Jang Yoo-jin	
2010	Drama Special: The Woman Next Door	Byun Hoon	one act-drama
2010	Playful Kiss	Bong Joon-gu	
2011	Pianissimo	Ki Da-rim	
2011	Bravo, My Love!	Byun Dong-woo	
2012	Rooftop Prince	Yong Tae-mu	
2013	Pots of Gold	Park Hyun-joon	
2015	My Mom	Kim Kang-jae	
2017–2018	My Golden Life	Seo Ji-tae	
2018	Ms. Hammurabi	Min Yong-joon	
2019	The Golden Garden	Choi Joon-ki	
2020	When My Love Blooms	Joo Young-woo	
2021	The Penthouse: War in Life 3	Prosecutor	Cameo (episode 11–12, 14)
2022	Ghost Doctor	Jang Min-ho	
2022	The Driver		Cameo
2022	Why Her	Ahn Kang-hoon	Cameo (episode 1)
2022–2023	Three Bold Siblings	Cha Yun-ho	

=== Television shows ===
Year	Title	Role	Notes/Ref.
2011–2012	K-Pop CON	MC	Performer, episode 1
2016	King of Mask Singer	Contestant	as "Want To Fly Flying Boy", episode 47
2016	Real Men	Cast member	Navy NCO special
2020–2022	My Little Old Boy	Cast member	
2021	Run Dang Dang	Cast member	

=== Music video appearances ===
Year	Artist	Song
2008	MC the Max	"Thorn Fish"
2008	MC the Max	"So Sick"
2009	Park Sang-min	"When I Miss You"
2010	Gavy NJ	"Sunny Side"
2012	BOB4	"Mystery Girl"

== Discography ==
=== Album ===
- Lee Tae-sung: When A Man Is In Love (Korean: 남자가 사랑할때) (2007)

=== Soundtrack appearances ===
- Lee Tae-sung: "Like the First Time" (Korean: 처음처럼) (Romance Zero OST, 2009)
- Lee Tae-sung: "Talking to Myself" (Korean: 혼잣말) (Playful Kiss OST, 2010)
- Hunter: "I Want to Be the Only Man For You" (Korean: 너에게 만은 남자이고 싶다) (City Hunter Special OST, 2011)

== Awards and nominations ==
Year	Award	Category	Nominated work	Result
2005	26th Blue Dragon Film Awards	Best New Actor	Blossom Again	Nominated
2006	42nd Baeksang Arts Awards	Best New Actor (Film)	Blossom Again	Nominated
2007	8th Busan Film Critics Awards	Best New Actor	Gangster High	Won
2010	MBC Drama Awards	Best New Actor	Enjoy Life, Playful Kiss	Won
2011	19th Korean Culture and Entertainment Awards	Best Actor	Bravo, My Love!	Won
2012	SBS Drama Awards	Special Acting Award, Actor in a Drama Special	Rooftop Prince	Nominated
2019	MBC Drama Awards	Excellence Award, Actor in a Weekend/Daily Drama	The Golden Garden	Nominated
2021	15th SBS Entertainment Awards	Grand Prize (Daesang) (Note: (with Shin Dong-yup, Seo Jang-hoon, Cho Hye-seon, Kim Sun-ja, Park Young-hye, Lee Sang-min, Tak Jae-hoon, Im Won-hee, Kim Joon-ho, Kim Jong-kook, Kim Hee-chul, Oh Min-suk, Park Goon, Choi Jin-hyuk))	My Little Old Boy	Won
