= TRAX (band) =

South Korean rock band

- Also known as: The TRAX (2004–09); TraxX (2018–19)
- Origin: Seoul, South Korea
- Genres: Rock; EDM
- Years active: 2004–2012; 2015–2019; 2024
- Labels: SM; Avex Trax
- Past members: Jay; Jungmo; Rose; Attack; Ginjo

TRAX (Korean: 트랙스; RR: Teuraekseu, formerly known as The TRAX and TraxX), were a South Korean rock band that consisted of Jay and Jungmo. Originally a four-member band formed by SM Entertainment and X Japan's co-founder Yoshiki in 2004, it consisted of Typhoon Jay (vocals), Rose Minwoo (drums, percussion), Attack Jungwoo (bass guitar), and Xmas Jungmo (guitar, bass guitar). Their band name is an acronym of Typhoon Rose Attack Xmas, which use as the members' nicknames.

No Min-woo and Jungwoo left the band in the period between 2006 and 2007. This resulted in the band becoming a duo with the remaining members being Jay and Jungmo. They changed their band name from The TRAX to simply TRAX. The duo kicked off with the release of the EPs Cold-Hearted Man (2010), Oh! My Goddess (2010), and Blind (2011). Thereafter, the members went into individual activities, with Jay pursuing acting and Jungmo collaborating with several artists.

On March 26, 2018, TRAX changed their name to TraxX with DJ and record producer Ginjo joining the band and changing their music genre from rock to electronic dance music.

Jay and Jungmo left SM in April 2019, putting the band's future in doubt. However, they re-formed ahead of their 20th anniversary in 2024.

== History ==
=== Pre-debut ===
Typhoon, Rose, and Attack were introduced initially to the public through in the 2002 Survival Audition HeeJun vs. KangTa Battle of the Century. The three-members were formed to debut as rock band. With the addition of X-mas, the four-member would debuted as rock band The Trax. Prior their official debuted, they made appearance on their labelmates song BoA's "Rock With You" which released in December 2003.

=== 2004–2007: Debut and First Rain ===
TRAX released their debut single "Paradox" on July 20, 2004. A few days after debuted, they held their concert on July 26 and on July 31.

Their second single "Scorpio" was simultaneously releases on November 14 in Japan and November 17 in South Korea.

TRAX released their second Japanese single "Rhapsody" on April 20, 2005. On September 12, it was announced that their third Japanese single titled "Blaze Away" would simultaneously releases in Japan and South Korea on September 14.

On May 10, 2006, drummer Rose (No Min-woo) left the band to pursue other interests. The remaining three-members release their first full-length album First Rain on July 20.

The band released their fourth Japanese single "Resolution" on August 3.

The band continue released their fifth Japanese single "Find The Way/Cold Rain" on January 24, 2007. It would be the band's last comeback with Attack, who quietly left the band without any formal announcement.

=== 2008–2012: Cold-Hearted Man, Oh! My Goddess, Blind and military services ===
In late 2008, vocalist Typhoon and guitarist X-Mas joined Super Junior members Heechul and Kangin as regulars in Mnet's television series Band of Brothers. In 2009, X-Mas was also cast on a short-lived show called Oppa Band along with Super Junior member Sungmin.

They released a digital single as a project band called TRAX+Air for the Korean drama Swallow the Sun.

On January 25, 2010, they released their EP Cold-Hearted Man with lead single "Let You Go". It contains songs written and composed by both Typhoon and X-Mas, and features artists such as SHINee's Key, Wheesung and T-MAX's Shin Min-chul.

In August 2010, TRAX became a special guest for Super Junior's third Asian tour, Super Show 3 on some tour dates, performing in the bridge of the song "Don't Don". Later that months, it was announced that the band would release their EP Oh! My Goddess on September 6, 2010. The EP contains six-tracks including its lead single of the same name.

On November 8, 2010, they released new song "Tell Me Your Love" for KBS's drama Mary Stayed Out All Night.

TRAX's third EP Blind was released on November 10, 2011. The EP contains six tracks including the lead single "Blind".

On March 26, 2012, Typhoon (Jay) enlisted for his two-year mandatory military service. He received four weeks of basic military training in Busan and then continued to serve as a public service worker. X-Mas (Kim Jung-mo) enlisted seven months later, on October 25, 2012. They were originally scheduled to enlist together, but Jung-mo's scoliosis condition and a fractured collarbone delayed his enlistment. He served non-active duty as a public service worker for 23 months after completing four weeks of basic training. Due to the members' enlistment in the military, the band took a hiatus.

=== 2015–2019: Reformation as EDM trio and disbandment ===
In July 2015, TRAX returned to performing in their label concert SM Town Live World Tour IV for the first time after a three-year hiatus.

On January 7, they released the digital single "Road" as a part of SM Entertainment's project SM Station. This marked their first release since Blind (2011).

On February 23, 2018, TRAX released their first EDM single "Notorious" with LIP2SHOT featuring Sophiya, as a part of SM Entertainment project SM Station.

On March 26, 2018, it was announced that TRAX changed their name to TraxX with addition DJ and producer Ginjo to the group and would transform their music genre from rock to EDM. On December 12, TraxX released their English-language single "Escape", which marked their first release since their revamp as an EDM trio.

On April 30, 2019, Jay and Jungmo left SM Entertainment after their contracts expired and effectly the band disbanded.

=== 2024: 20th anniversary project ===
On July 15, SM announced that TRAX would returned as band with releasing new single "To Be Continued" on July 17, to commemorate their 20th debut anniversary.

== Band members ==
=== Final line-up ===
- Jay — vocals (2004–2019; 2024)
- Jungmo — guitar (2004–2019; 2024); bass guitar (2018–2019)

=== Former members ===
- Rose — drums, percussion (2004–2006)
- Attack — bass guitar (2004–2007) (Note: Attack's departure was never formally announced by SM Entertainment, leaving his window of departure unknown.)
- Ginjo — DJ (2018–2019)

== Discography ==
=== Studio albums ===
| Title | Album details | Peak chart positions | Sales |
| Title | Album details | KOR | Sales |
|---|---|---|---|
| Cold Rain (초우) | Released: July 18, 2006; Label: SM Entertainment; Formats: CD, cassette | 19 | KOR: 8,164+ |

=== Extended plays ===
| Title | Album details | Peak chart positions | Sales |
| Title | Album details | KOR | Sales |
|---|---|---|---|
| Let You Go (가슴이 차가운 남자) | Released: January 25, 2010; Label: SM Entertainment; Formats: CD, digital download | 6 | —N/a |
| Oh! My Goddess (오! 나의 여신님) | Released: September 6, 2010; Label: SM Entertainment; Formats: CD, digital download | 5 | —N/a |
| Blind (창문) | Released: November 10, 2011; Label: SM Entertainment; Formats: CD, digital download | 8 | KOR: 2,852+ |

=== Singles ===
| Title | Year | Peak chart positions | | Sales | Album |
| Title | Year | KOR | JPN | Sales | Album |
Korean
| "Paradox" | 2004 | 37 (Note: Charted on the RIAK monthly album chart.) | — | KOR: 4,013+ | Paradox single album |
| "Scorpio" (Korean ver.) | 2004 | 26 (Note: Charted on the RIAK monthly album chart.) | — | KOR: 5,746+ | Scorpio single album |
| "Cold Rain" (초우) | 2006 | —N/a | — | —N/a | Cold Rain |
| "Let You Go" (가슴이 차가운 남자) | 2010 | 20 | — | —N/a | Let You Go |
| "Oh! My Goddess" (오! 나의 여신님) | 2010 | 30 | — | —N/a | Oh! My Goddess |
| "Blind" (창문) | 2011 | 115 | — | —N/a | Blind |
| "Road" | 2017 | — | — | —N/a | SM Station Season 1 |
| "Notorious" (with LIP2SHOT feat. Sophiya) | 2018 | — | — | —N/a | SM Station Season 2 |
| "To Be Continued" (계속될 이야기) | 2024 | — | — | —N/a | Non-album single |
Japanese
| "Scorpio" (Japanese ver.) | 2004 | — | 28 | —N/a | Scorpio single album |
| "Rhapsody" | 2005 | — | 95 | —N/a | Rhapsody single album |
| "Blaze Away" | 2005 | — | 129 | —N/a | Blaze Away single album |
| "Resolution" | 2006 | — | — | —N/a | Resolution single album |
| "Find The Way / Cold Rain (初雨)" | 2007 | — | 189 | —N/a | Non-album single |
English
| "Escape" | 2018 | — | — | —N/a | Non-album single |
"—" denotes release did not chart or was not released in that region. "N/A" denotes data is unavailable.

=== As featured artist ===
| Title | Year | Peak chart positions | Sales | Album |
| Title | Year | KOR | Sales | Album |
|---|---|---|---|---|
| "Tri-Angle" (TVXQ feat. BoA and TRAX) | 2004 | —N/a | —N/a | Tri-Angle |
| "Free Your Mind" (TVXQ feat. TRAX) | 2005 | —N/a | —N/a | Rising Sun |
"—" denotes release did not chart. "N/A" denotes data is unavailable.

=== Soundtrack appearances ===
| Title | Year | Peak chart positions | Sales | Album |
| Title | Year | KOR | Sales | Album |
|---|---|---|---|---|
| "Fate" (운명) | 2009 | —N/a | —N/a | Swallow the Sun OST |
| "Heaven" (하늘아) | 2012 | — | —N/a | God of War OST |
"—" denotes release did not chart. "N/A" denotes data is unavailable.

== Concerts ==
=== Headlining ===
- TRAX 1st Concert (July 24, 2004)
- TRAX 2nd Concert (July 31, 2004)

=== Concert participation ===
- SM Summer Town Festival (2006)
- SM Town Summer Concert (2007)
- SM Town Live '08 (2008–2009)
- SM Town Live '10 World Tour (2010–2011)
- SM Town Live World Tour III (2012)
- SM Town Live World Tour IV (2015)
- SM Town Live World Tour V (2016)
- SM Town Live World Tour VI (2017)

== Related publications ==
- 1st Story Book - BLAST (December 1, 2004)

== Awards and nominations ==
| Year | Award | Category | Nominated work | Result |
|---|---|---|---|---|
| 2004 | Mnet Asian Music Awards | Best Rock Video | "Paradox" | Nominated |
