= Romance Zero =

- Also known as: Full Romance; Zero Flawed Task Force; Haja Squad Zero
- Written by: Kim Eun-yong
- Directed by: Noh Jong-chan
- Starring: Lee Tae-sung; Kangin; Lee Da-in; Kim Hee-won; Jay Kim; Lee Kyung-eun
- Opening theme: "Evening Paradise" by Jay Kim & Kyu Won
- Country of origin: South Korea
- No. of episodes: 16

Production
- Production company: Bon Factory Worldwide

Original release
- Network: MBC Dramanet
- Release: February 14 – May 23, 2009

Romance Zero (Korean: 하자 전담반 제로; RR: Haja jeondamban jero) is a 2009 South Korean television series that aired on MBC Dramanet from February 14 to May 23, 2009, on Saturdays at 23:00 for 16 episodes.

== Plot ==
Kim Woo-jin (Lee Tae-sung) is the top couple manager at the matchmaking company, "Wedding Factory." At the start of the story, he is at a wedding watching one of his matchmaking couples get married only to witness that the groom is indeed gay, causing a huge scandal. As a result, Woo-jin is demoted and is forced to take charge of a group working at the matchmaking company known as "Team Zero," all of whom have failed individually to matchmake a couple.

== Cast ==
- Lee Tae-sung as Kim Woo-jin

An egotistical and arrogant couple manager who manages to get himself demoted at the matchmaking company. He is forced to take charge of "Team Zero" and turn into the best matchmaking group in six months or the company will terminate his contract. However, he later sets up his own matchmaking company called "Zero Base" alongside his team members and aims to make it the best matchmaking company in Korea. It is revealed that he is the ex-husband of Oh Soo-jung, a kind-hearted shopkeeper and doctor, who he still has feelings for. However, during a drunken night, he ends up sleeping with Mi-na and they soon begin to develop feelings for each other.

- Kangin as Na Ho-tae

A bright young intern who joins "Team Zero" and later becomes a full-time employee of "Zero Base." He is kind-hearted and aims to act cupid and spread love around Korea. Whilst helping out one of his clients, he meets Oh Soo-jung at a hospital and they become friends. He begins to develop feelings for her and starts visiting her shop every day. The two soon begin dating however, Woo-jin becomes jealous which leads to Ho-tae quitting his job at "Zero Base."

- Lee Da-in as Jo Mi-na

A feisty and spirited couple manager who is part of "Team Zero" and later "Zero Base." She constantly carries a Buddha statue with her and is very superstitious. Prior to joining "Team Zero" she had a 100% matchmaking rate but had only managed to match six people in two years. She was also scolded at her previous companies for dating her clients. During a drunken night, she ends up sleeping with Woo-jin and then soon begins to develop feelings for him.

- Kim Hee-won as Jang Yeo-sa

A strange but kind-hearted couple manager who claims to have been in the matchmaking business for twenty years. Yeo-sa hates to be called old and asks everyone to call her Mrs. Jang. She always carries an umbrella with her due to a man she has been waiting for, for twenty years. She joins "Team Zero" and later becomes a part of "Zero Base."

- Park Hee-jin as Min-ha
- Jay Kim as Kim Doo-hyun
- Lee Kyung-eun as Oh Soo-jung
- Yang Bae-chu as Jung Do-ryung
- Kim Jung-do as Hyung-suk (ep 2)
- Go Yoon-hoo as Baek Do-hoon (ep 7)
- Kang Yoo-jin
- Lee Hyung-suk

== International broadcast ==
- It aired in Thailand on Modernine TV from January 27 to February 29, 2012, dubbed as Borisus Jadrak Huajai Kukkik. ("บริษัทจัดรักหัวใจกุ๊กกิ๊ก", literally: Tinkle Heart Company). Thai: ภาษาไทย
- It aired in Vietnam on VTV3 from September 7, 2014, dubbed as Biệt đội số 0.
