= The Hitmaker =

Fender Stratocaster guitar owned by Nile Rodgers

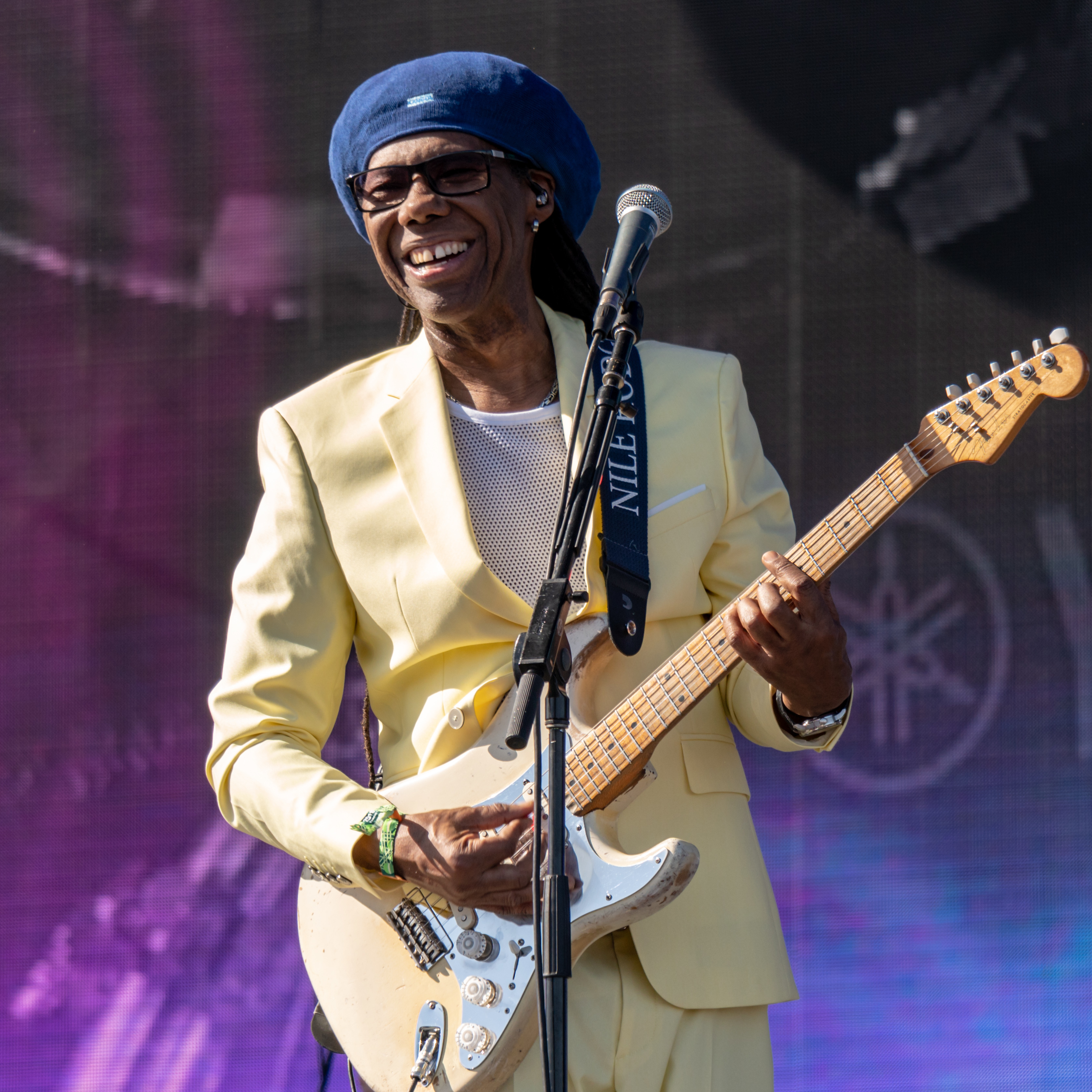
Nile Rodgers playing The Hitmaker at Coachella, 2018

The Hitmaker is the Fender Stratocaster owned by American guitarist Nile Rodgers. The guitar is a white 1960s model (sometimes incorrectly identified as a 1959 model) with a hardtail bridge, which has been retrofitted with a 1959 maple neck.

Rodgers got the guitar in a shop in Miami Beach, Florida; at the time, fellow Chic-member and bassist Bernard Edwards suggested he trade in the Gibson he was playing because Rodgers was shifting genres. The Stratocaster was "pivotal" in the development of the funky style that came to be called "chucking".

== Hits ==
Hit songs recorded with The Hitmaker include Sister Sledge, "We Are Family"; Madonna, "Like a Virgin"; Daft Punk, "Get Lucky"; Chic, "Le Freak"; David Bowie, "Let's Dance"; Diana Ross, "I'm Coming Out"; and Duran Duran, "Notorious". The New Musical Express reports that at one time an estimate of the value of the music played through the instrument was $2 billion.

In 2013, Rodgers accidentally left The Hitmaker on a train. He has written of the paralyzing and devastating fear he felt on being unable to locate the one guitar he cannot live without. However, after an extensive search, the guitar was found at the train yard at the end of the line.

== Tribute model ==
In 2014, the Fender Custom Shop released a tribute model. It has a light alder body and a one-piece maple neck, and three Custom Shop 1969 single-coil Stratocaster pickups. The guitar is finished in Olympic White and relic'ed.
