= Hitmaker (2016 TV program) =

- Genre: Travel; Sports; Variety
- Starring: Kangin; Jung Joon-young; Jung Jin-woon; Lee Chul-woo
- Country of origin: South Korea
- Original language: Korean
- No. of episodes: 3

Production
- Production location: South Korea

Original release
- Network: JTBC
- Release: May 6 – May 20, 2016

Hitmaker (Korean: 히트메이커) is a 2016 South Korean variety show starring Kangin, Jung Joon-young, Jung Jin-woon and Lee Chul-woo. It airs on JTBC on Fridays at 23:20 (KST).

== Cast members ==
- Kangin
- Jung Joon-young
- Jung Jin-woon
- Lee Chul-woo
