= Kangin =

South Korean singer and actor

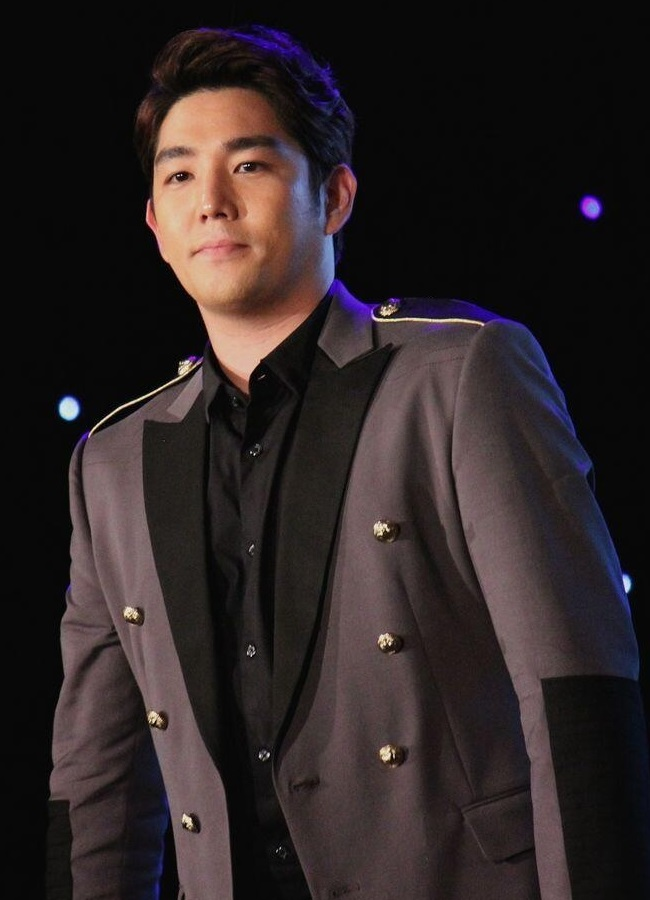
- Kangin in 2014
- Born: Kim Young-woon; January 17, 1985 (age 41); Seoul, South Korea
- Occupations: Singer; actor; television host; radio personality
- Musical career
- Genre: K-pop
- Years active: 2005–present
- Labels: SM; Label SJ
- Formerly of: Super Junior; Super Junior-T; Super Junior-H; SM Town

Korean name
- Hangul: 김영운
- Hanja: 金永雲
- RR: Gim Yeongun
- MR: Kim Yŏngun

Stage name
- Hangul: 강인
- Hanja: 强仁
- RR: Gangin
- MR: Kangin

YouTube information
- Channel: kangin1985
- Subscribers: 25.3 thousand
- Views: 1 million
- Last updated: March 21, 2026

Signature
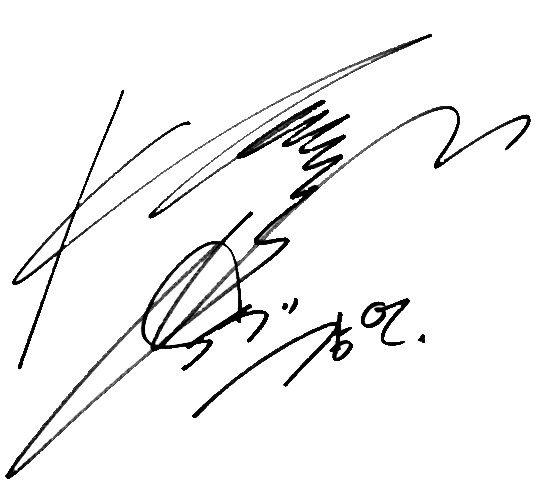

Kim Young-woon (born January 17, 1985), known professionally as Kangin (lit. meaning: "strong benevolence"), is a South Korean former singer, actor, television host, and radio personality. He is best known as a former member of Super Junior and its subgroups Super Junior-T, Super Junior-H.

== Career ==
=== Super Junior ===
Kangin officially debuted as part of 12-member project group Super Junior 05 on November 6, 2005, on SBS' music program Popular Songs, performing their first single, "Twins (Knock Out)". Their debut album SuperJunior05 (Twins) was released a month later on December 5, 2005, and debuted at number three on the monthly MIAK K-pop album charts.

In March 2006, SM Entertainment began to recruit new members for the next Super Junior generation. However, plans changed and the company declared a halt in forming future Super Junior generations. Following the addition of thirteenth member Kyuhyun, the group dropped the suffix "05" and became officially credited as Super Junior. The re-polished group's first CD single "U" was released on June 7, 2006, which was their most successful single until the release of "Sorry, Sorry" in March 2009.

In February 2007, he was placed in the trot-singing Super Junior-T. A year later, he became a member of Super Junior-H. Kangin's silver-screen debut was in the Super Junior film Attack on the Pin-Up Boys, which premiered on July 26, 2007.

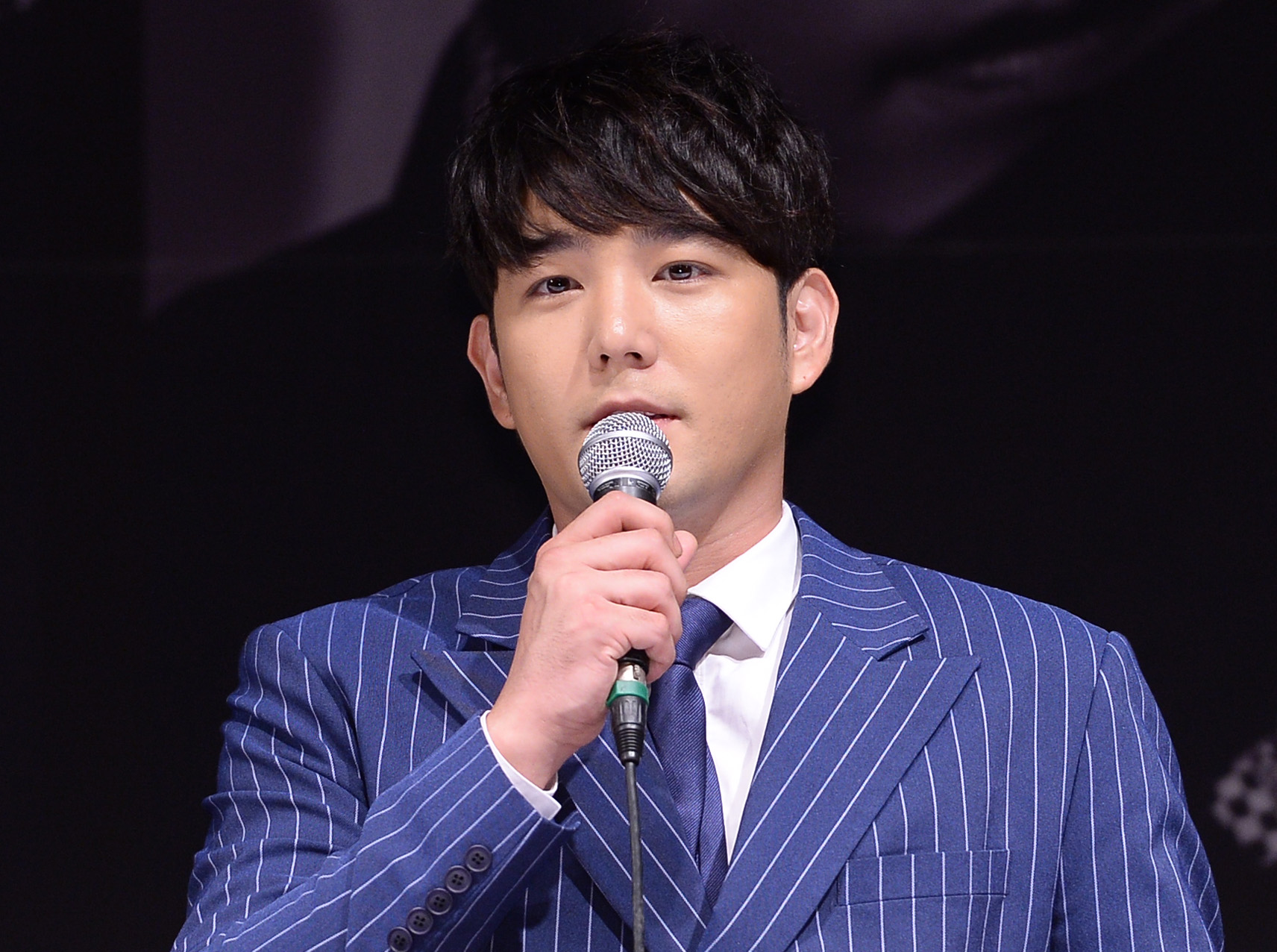
Kangin during a press conference for Devil in 2015

In June 2012, SM Entertainment announced that Kangin will rejoin Super Junior for the group's sixth album, Sexy, Free & Single, which was released on July 1, 2012. This also marked the first time he appeared with Super Junior in three years since October 2009. On June 25, his teaser photo was released showing a slim downed Kangin with a frosty look and a net-like veil over his head.

On July 11, 2019, Kangin withdrew from Super Junior, having been on hiatus since 2015 as a result of his second DUI offense. However, he will continue his contract with SM.

=== Solo activities ===
After he debuted with Super Junior, Kangin became a regular on MBC variety show, Image Survival until February 2006. In 2006, Kangin frequently acted as an MC at fan meetings for SM artists such as DBSK and BoA and MC for channel EBS TV. In 2006 and 2007, he went on many variety show as a guest and sometimes as a regular cast member on shows such as Love Triangle, KBS Star King, KBS Vitamin and MBC Driving School with Leeteuk as a regular cast member. His television appearances and hosting gigs earned him the highest salary in Super Junior.

Five days after Super Junior 05's debut performance, Kangin became the MC of Mnet's M!Countdown along with Leeteuk and Shindong. The trio stayed as the hosts throughout the remaining year until Kangin was replaced by Eunhyuk in mid-2006 due to his busy schedule from hosting EBS Reckless Radio and MBC's music program, Show! Music Core. Kangin left Reckless Radio in June 2007 to host MBC's Good Friend Radio with Cho Jungrin. In 2008, Kangin was chosen to take the role of 'Kang Soo' in the Korean language film, Hello, Schoolgirl.

Kangin also became the television host for two of MBC's popular entertainment programs, Sunday Sunday Night Dong-An Club and Nothing is Impossible. On channel Mnet, Kangin starred in 'Band of Brothers 2008' with Heechul, Jay and Jungmo. On channel MTV, Kangin was an MC for 'Class Up' in 2008. Kangin was one of four MCs for SBS 'Change' variety show in 2008. From September 9 to November 9, 2008, Kangin, along with bandmate Heechul, debuted as musical actors through the musical, Xanadu. Xanadu was a 1980s musical film starring Gene Kelly and Olivia Newton-John. Xanadu has also been reproduced as a Broadway musical. Heechul and Kangin, along with Choi Sungwon, performed the same character, Sonny, according to their time slot, and auditions and casting picks were chosen in a process through reality television.

In April 2008, Cho's hosting spot was replaced by Kim Tae-yeon. Kangin's last day of hosting the program was on April 19, 2009. From December 2008 to May 2009, Kangin and actress Lee Yoon-ji played a low-income college couple for the popular MBC reality show We Got Married. This was the first MBC variety show Kangin participated in after the time-slot dispute between MBC and SM Entertainment regarding Kangin's job as host on SBS Super Junior Exploration of Human Body in 2007.

In 2009, Kangin with other few Super Junior members hosted television show for charity named 'Miracle'. Kangin was also cast to take on the role of 'Hotae' for MBC's cable comedy drama, Romance Zero. With a total of sixteen episodes, the drama ended in late May 2009 with acceptable reviews and ratings.

In May 2019, Kangin starred in the ongoing web drama What Happened to Mirae?, which was his first project since his DUIs in 2016; the first episode premiered on May 31.

In April 2025, Kangin held his first solo fan meeting in Mexico, titled Inside Out Day, at Foro Bailmex in PALCCO, located in Zapopan, Jalisco. The event was organized in collaboration with KOCUFest and the municipal government of Zapopan, marking one of the first official K-pop fan meetings outside of Mexico City. An estimated 4,000 to 5,000 fans attended the event, which featured interactive segments, live performances in Korean and Spanish, and a Q&A session with the artist. On November 12, Kangin announced that he would embark on his first solo overseas tour in 2026, titled "Stunning Together".

== Personal life ==
=== 2010–2012: Military service ===
On July 5, 2010, Kangin enlisted for his mandatory military service at the Nonsan military camp in Chungcheongnam-do Province, for five weeks of basic training followed by 20 months of active duty with the Republic of Korea Army. He was discharged on April 16, 2012, from the 56th army division in Namyangju-si in Gyeonggi-do.

== Controversies ==
=== 2007: MBC conflict ===
A time-slot dispute occurred between SM Entertainment and MBC when SM insisted to have Kangin stay on SBS' Explorers of the Human Body instead of MBC's Sunday Sunday Night Dong-An Club, in which Kangin was a regular host. MBC decided to temporarily ban Super Junior from appearing in any future performances on MBC. Kangin was replaced by T.O.P of Big Bang as the MC of Show! Music Core. Kangin could also no longer host MBC variety shows Nothing is Impossible and Sunday Sunday Night Dong-An Club until the conflict was resolved. MBC also demanded an apology from SM Entertainment if SM artists should continue to perform on shows hosted by the channel. After Kangin left Nothing is Impossible and Sunday Sunday Night Dong-An Club, both shows were later cancelled due to low ratings. A week later, MBC announced that they invited Super Junior to film an exclusive MBC segment, "Giving Children a New Life" despite their previous decision to ban Super Junior. The entertainment director for MBC claimed that the ban on Super Junior was never official, but a decision made by the programs' producers.

=== 2009: Assault case ===
On September 16, 2009, Kangin was arrested for his involvement in a fight between two men that took place outside a bar in Nonhyeon-dong, Gangnam-gu, Seoul. An eye-witness reported that two men entered a room where Kangin and his friend were present and began arguing heatedly. Kangin left the bar, but the two men followed him outside and began displaying acts of violence. Another witness reported that Kangin tried to stop the fight. A nearby surveillance camera caught the brawl, and it was immediately reported to the police. Kangin was brought into interrogation to aid with the investigation along with four other suspects. One of the suspects insisted that Kangin assaulted him, but it was later proven that Kangin only reacted in self-defense.

As a result of this altercation, Kangin was dropped from being the main model of Andre Kim's fashion show. After Kangin's appearance in Super Junior's Super Show 2 concert in Hong Kong, all of Kangin's future schedules became temporarily postponed.

=== 2009: DUI hit-and-run ===
On October 16, 2009, around 3 AM, Kangin collided into two parked taxis, and left the scene of the hit-and-run incident. The occupants of the two vehicles, including the drivers and two passengers, were reportedly uninjured. Five hours later, Kangin turned himself in to the police. He was recorded to have a blood alcohol content of 0.082% when he arrived at the station. He then failed to show up at the Seoul Gangnam Police Station at 2 PM on the same day for further investigation and had to be called in the following day.

SM Entertainment and Kangin released a public apology shortly after. All of Kangin's activities were cancelled by SM Entertainment until the end of the year due to Kangin's actions. A month later, Kangin made an appearance in a new clothing company, SPAO's website. Netizens were enraged due to SM Entertainment's declaration of the suspension of Kangin's activities. It was later found out that the photos were taken prior to Kangin's DUI incident. On January 13, 2010, Kangin was indicted for drunk driving, hit-and-run and fined ₩8 million by the Seoul Central District Court.

=== 2016: Second DUI hit-and-run ===
On May 24, 2016, Kangin was involved in another DUI hit-and-run incident, where he turned himself in after a few hours. He was then found with a blood alcohol content of 0.05%. SM Entertainment has issued a statement, stating his future activities were cancelled while he reflects on his actions. He entered the Seoul Central District Prosecutors' Office on June 15, 2016, to face questioning over causing a traffic collision while under the influence of alcohol. Prosecutors summarily indicted him on July 7. On September 7, 2016, Kangin was sentenced to pay a ₩7 million ($6,420) fine.

=== 2017: Second assault incident ===
On November 17, 2017, police responded after receiving a call that Kangin was drunk and assaulting a woman at an escort bar in the Nonhyeon neighborhood of Seoul. Upon investigation police described it as a "a minor dispute, and the parties reconciled at the scene and took measures to return home." With no injuries, and no parties wished for charges to be pressed, so Kangin was sent off with a warning and not formally booked on any charges.

== Discography ==
=== Singles ===
Year	Track	Album	Artist
2008	Suddenly	Xanadu Musical OST	Kangin
2015	Please Call My Name	The Cat Funeral OST	Kangin
2015	Memories	D-Day OST	Kangin
2016	Don't Cry, Man	Don't Cry, Man (Single)	Kangin, Kim Jang Hoon

== Filmography ==
=== Film ===
Year	Title	Role	Ref.
2007	Attack on the Pin-Up Boys	Judo Society captain	
2007	Alvin and the Chipmunks (Korean voice-cover)	Alvin (Korean voice-cover)	
2008	Hello, Schoolgirl	Kang Sook	
2015	The Cat Funeral	Dong-hoon	

=== Television series ===
Year	Title	Role
2005	The Secret Lovers	Cameo
2006	Rainbow Romance	Cameo
2006	Billie Jean, Look at Me	Friend
2008	Here He Comes	Cameo
2009	Romance Zero	Na Ho-tae

=== Web series ===
Year	Title	Role
2019	What Happened to Mirae?	Dong Joon
2024	Kanginham	Travel and Food Vlogger

=== Television shows ===
Year	Title	Role	Notes/Ref.
2004	Night of TV Entertainment	Panel	
2005–2006	M!Countdown	MC	
2006–2007	Sunday Dong-an Club	MC	
2006–2007	Nothing is Impossible		
2007	Show! Music Core	MC	
2007	Sprint! Hall of Records	MC	
2007	Gag Concert	Various roles	400th episode special
2008	Change		
2008	To Be Kangin And Heechul	Cast member	
2008–2009	Band of Brothers	Cast member	
2008–2009	We Got Married (Season 1)		Episode 39–55
2009	Miracle		
2013	Splash		
2014	Show Champion	MC	
2014	A Celebrity Lives In My Home	Cast	
2014	Clenched Fist Chef	Host	
2014	Law of the Jungle	Cast member	in Brazil, Relay Survival (Episode 112–116)
2014–2015	Global Request Show - A Song For You	MC	Season 2–4
2015	Real Man 2	Member	
2015	Shin Dong Yup's Bachelor Party	Cast	
2015	Baseballok	Cast	
2015	King of Mask Singer	Panelist	2015 Special
2015	King of Mask Singer	Contestant	Episode 45
2015–2016	A Man Who Feeds The Dog	Regular Member	Season 1
2016	The Boss is Watching	Regular Member	
2016	Law of the Jungle	Cast member	in Papua New Guinea (Episode 216–219)
2016	Hitmaker	Cast	

=== Musical ===
- 2008: Xanadu - Sonny Station
- 2013: Palace - Daejeon Station
- 2015: Day (Japan)

=== Radio DJ ===
Year	Title	Ref.
2006–2007	Reckless Radio (천방지축 라디오)	
2007–2009	Good Friend Radio (친한친구 라디오)	

== Awards and nominations ==
Year	Award	Category	Nominated work	Result
2007	Mnet 20's Choice Awards	Best Bad Boy	—N/a	Won
2008	MBC Entertainment Awards	Best DJ	—N/a	Won
2008	MBC Drama Awards	Excellence Award in Radio	Kangin's Good Friends	Won
2019	Seoul Webfest Awards	Best Actor	What Happened to Mirae	Won
