= Redo of Healer =

Japanese light novel series and its adaptations

- Cover of the first light novel featuring Flare Arlgrande Jioral (left) and Keyaru (right)

回復術士のやり直し 〜即死魔法とスキルコピーの超越ヒール〜 (Kaifuku Jutsushi no Yarinaoshi: Sokushi Mahō to Sukiru Kopī no Chōetsu Hīru)
- Genre: Dark fantasy; Harem; Rape and revenge
- Novel series
- Written by: Rui Tsukiyo
- Published by: Shōsetsuka ni Narō
- Original run: December 29, 2016 – present
- Light novel
- Written by: Rui Tsukiyo
- Illustrated by: Shiokonbu
- Published by: Kadokawa Shoten
- Imprint: Kadokawa Sneaker Bunko
- Original run: July 1, 2017 – present
- Volumes: 10
- Manga
- Written by: Rui Tsukiyo
- Illustrated by: Sōken Haga
- Published by: Kadokawa Shoten
- Magazine: Young Ace Up
- Original run: October 24, 2017 – present
- Volumes: 19
- Anime television series
- Directed by: Takuya Asaoka
- Produced by: Sōjirō Arimizu; Aya Iizuka; Seiichi Kawashima; Taiyō Matsuda; Natsuki Miyagawa; Satoshi Motonaga; Terushige Yoshie
- Written by: Kazuyuki Fudeyasu
- Music by: Kenji Fujisawa; Akinari Suzuki; Johannes Nilsson
- Studio: TNK
- Licensed by: Sentai Filmworks
- Original network: AT-X (uncensored); Tokyo MX, KBS, SUN, BS11 (censored)
- Original run: January 13, 2021 – March 31, 2021
- Episodes: 12
- Manga

Kaifuku Jutsushi no Omotenashi
- Written by: Rui Tsukiyo
- Illustrated by: Ken Nagao
- Published by: Kadokawa Shoten
- Magazine: Young Ace Up
- Original run: January 18, 2021 – May 23, 2022
- Volumes: 2
- icon

Redo of Healer (Japanese: 回復術士のやり直し 〜即死魔法とスキルコピーの超越ヒール〜, Hepburn: Kaifuku Jutsushi no Yarinaoshi: Sokushi Mahō to Sukiru Kopī no Chōetsu Hīru; lit. "The Healer's Do-Over: Transcendent Healing Through Insta-Kill Magic and Skill Copying"), also known in Japan as KaiYari for short, is a Japanese light novel series written by Rui Tsukiyo and illustrated by Shiokonbu. It began serialization online in December 2016 on the user-generated novel publishing website Shōsetsuka ni Narō. It was later acquired by Kadokawa Shoten, who have published the series since July 2017 under their Kadokawa Sneaker Bunko imprint.

A manga adaptation with art by Sōken Haga has been serialized online via Kadokawa Shoten's Young Ace Up website since October 2017. An anime television series adaptation by TNK aired from January to March 2021.

== Premise ==
Keyaru, who is exploited by his government, as well as mentally, physically and sexually abused repeatedly by others due to being a healing magician, notices what lays just beyond his healing magic, and is convinced that a healing magician is the strongest class in the world. However, by the time he realizes his own potential, he is already deprived of everything. Thus, using his healing magic, enhanced by the magic-enhancing properties of the Philosopher's Stone on the world itself, he goes back four years into the past, deciding to redo everything and get revenge on the ones who abused him and take down a corrupted empire.

== Characters ==
Keyaru (ケヤル) / Keyarga (ケヤルガ, Keyaruga) / Keara (ケアーラ, Keāra)
Voiced by: Yuya Hozumi (Keyaru/Keyarga), Yoko Hikasa (Keara)
The Healing Hero and the series' main protagonist, who was blessed with the hero's insignia from the coming-of-age. He, however, wanted to save the world from demons only to endure four years of physical, mental, and sexual abuse at the hands of his own allies, making him see how corrupted the Jioral Kingdom is. In the midst of the battle with the demon lord, Eve, Keyaru managed to retain himself finding the true nature of his power and obtains the Philosopher's Stone. Instead of handing it to Flare as instructed, he uses the item to travel back in time, all while being able to maintain his memories of the original timeline, to exact revenge against his torturers and bring down Jioral. During this, he changes his appearance and renames himself Keyarga. His thirst for revenge and mostly psychopathic personality (caused by the torture he endured) makes him a villain protagonist, although he does have a caring side.
Flare Arlgrande Jioral (フレア・アールグランデ・ジオラル, Furea Ārugurande Jioraru) / Freia (フレイア, Fureia)
Voiced by: Ayano Shibuya
The Magic Hero and the first princess of the Jioral Kingdom. Flare is the main source of Keyaru's suffering and merely sees him as a baggage carrier and drugs him so he would be receptive to her commands and trains him so that he can be of some use to her. Generally, she saw healing magicians as the lowest class in the magic world until Keyaru has proven otherwise and does not trust her with the Philosopher's Stone. In the alternate timeline, when Flare is left vulnerable, Keyaru tortures and rapes her, takes her powers, erases and alters her memories and appearance to become his companion and lover named Freia, all while deceiving everyone into thinking that Flare is dead. As Freia, she is meek, kind, and obeys Keyarga's every command, including sometimes "acting" as Flare, caring only for him above all else. She is one of Keyarga's closest allies.
Setsuna (セツナ) / Nayuta (ナユタ)
Voiced by: Shizuka Ishigami
A female demi-human slave that Keyaru buys and recruits into his party. Prior to this, she was infected with an illness (which Keyarga helps to cure), but her rage allows her to withstand it. Setsuna comes from the Ice Wolf clan whereas estranged from humanity and usually sold into slavery that defeats the purpose of equality in the Jioral Kingdom. As Keyarga offers her the chance to avenge her tribe, she reveals her unspoken true name to receive empowering strength from Keyarga, allowing him to gain control over her. Setsuna later becomes sexually attached to Keyarga and often competes with Freia for his affections. Similar to Freia, she is also Keyarga's closest companion.
Eve Reese (イヴ・リース, Ibu Rīsu)
Voiced by: Natsumi Takamori
A female black-winged demon who is one of the candidates to become the Demon Lord. In the previous timeline where she did become the Demon Lord and fought Keyaru in the bitter end, she tearfully begged him to spare her and granted him the Philosopher's Stone, prompting Keyaru to know what she was really trying to protect. Her objective is to kill the current Demon Lord for trying to exterminate her brethren. When she completes the trials of Caladrius, her hair changes from black to silver. In the alternate timeline, she becomes a member of Keyarga's group. After forming cooperation with her newfound empire, Eve and Keyarga develop mutual love for each other and unlike the other girls, they have proper sex.
Norn Clatalissa Jioral (ノルン・クラタリッサ・ジオラル, Norun Kuratarissa Jioraru) / Ellen (エレン, Eren)
Voiced by: Minami Tsuda
The second princess of Jioral Kingdom, and younger sister of Flare. Both sisters had a close relationship until Flare received a higher reputation for awakening as the Magic Hero and belittles Norn. Compared to her big sister, Norn is a strategist who runs her kingdom in a sadistic and manipulative manner and aims to drive Flare out of the throne. In the previous world, Norn saw through Keyaru's scheme and revenge plot but foolishly lets it slide, making him see Norn his greatest foe. Following Flare's apparent murder, Norn meant to gain aid from neighboring kingdoms by exterminating all innocent demons, after her soldiers killed a friend that Keyarga got to know. He and Freia halt her schemes and capture her. As he did with Flare, Keyarga rapes her and erases and alters Norn's memories and appearance to become his little sister named Ellen. As Ellen, she has a brother complex and views Freia as a "big sister".
Kureha Clyret (クレハ・クライレット, Kureha Kurairetto)
Voiced by: Natsuki Aikawa
A female knight of Jioral Kingdom, renowned as the Blade Goddess. Kureha owes Keyaru her gratitude for fixing her amputated arm from their first meeting. She initially opposes Keyaru's party after believing that they were attacking soldiers who were trying to protect Setsuna's village (not realizing that the soldiers were actually threatening the villagers), but allies with them after learning of her kingdom's atrocities. Freia pretends to be her old self to yield Kureha to her words. After being exposed to aphrodisiac and becoming an obedient ally, Keyaru rapes Kureha as punishment for going against him; Kureha does not resist as she has truly developed feelings for him, and also has her act as an informant for him. Her constant flirting with Keyaru makes the other girls jealous. She eventually becomes the successor of the Sword Hero.
Bullet (ブレット, Buretto)
Voiced by: Tetsu Inada
The Cannon Hero. Having an obsessive sexual attraction to young boys, he targets Keyaru for rape and murder. Due to the trauma, Keyarga will not allow a single male into his party, preferring only females. Bullet controls an underground lair filled with male labrats that Proum is aware of. Keyarga underestimated Bullet when he eventually snags the Philosopher's Stone from Keyarga's hands after the current Demon Lord's downfall; now, he must get it back. He worries that he will have to sacrifice Eve to confront Bullet.
Blade (ブレイド, Bureido)
Voiced by: Mami Fujita
The Sword Hero, affiliated with the Jioral Kingdom. She has an intense homosexual infatuation that urges her to rape ideal girls to death. In the previous timeline, Blade would torment and physically beat up Keyaru every night for "touching" Flare to beset her frustration. Although she is one of Keyaru's torturers, Keyarga does not erase and alter her memories and appearance like how he did to Flare and Norn, instead leaving her to be eaten alive by brainwashed men. Blade is the only person to know of Keyaru's past life.
Anna (アンナ)
Voiced by: Asuka Nishi
A villager from the same village as Keyaru. Anna provides Keyaru food and shelter since his parents' deaths. She encourages Keyaru to follow his belief in changing the world for the better. While Anna cares for Keyaru as her kid, he acknowledges her as his first love. Anna is presented as a normal young woman of medium height with waist-length light brown hair. It is later discovered that Leonard had raped her and destroyed his home, which enrages Keyaru. She dies from the trauma before he can save her.
Leonard (レナード, Renādo)
Voiced by: Yasuaki Takumi (male), Eri Akiyama (female)
The antagonistic captain of the Jioral Kingdom's knights who lacks any sense of sympathy and lashes at the imprisoned Keyaru for doing "nothing." In the alternate timeline, Keyaru alters his face to resemble his own in order to trick Flare into arresting him, and then frames him for Flare's apparent murder. When Proum learns of this (although both he and Leonard are unaware that Flare is still alive), he is released and sent to hunt down Keyaru, who by now has changed his name to Keyarga. After Leonard murders Anna, Keyarga takes his revenge on him by turning him into a girl, having him get gang raped by his brainwashed troops, and then burning them alive.
Redra Gordoman (レドラ・ゴルドマン, Redora Gorudoman)
Voiced by: Naomi Kusumi
A merchant in the city of Lanaritta.
Karman (カルマン, Karuman)
Voiced by: Reiou Tsuchida
A store owner from the city of Branica with whom Keyaru forms a close bond. He is later killed by Norn's army.
Trist Organ (トリスト・オルガン, Torisuto orugan)
Voiced by: Ryōtarō Okiayu
A knight of the Jioral Kingdom and one of the Three Champions of his nation (it is unknown who the other two champions are). His perceived detection skill gave him the name "Hawkeye." He accompanies Norn during her attack on Branica. During his honorable fight with Keyarga, he loses and gets killed before he can have his abilities copied.
Proum Jioral (プローム・ジオラル, Purōmu Jioraru)
Voiced by: Takaya Hashi
The king of the Jioral Kingdom, Flare and Norn's "biological" father, and the series' main antagonist. He sends Leonard and later Bullet to hunt down Keyarga for devastating his kingdom and for the death of his daughters, little realizing that they are still alive. However, Proum's true form reveals that he is not human.
Guren (グレン)
A divine beast who soon becomes one of Keyarga's party members. She can change form between a kitsune and a human. Keyaru received Guren's egg from Miru in the Kokuyoku village. Guren showed signs of hatching after absorbing the mana of Freia, Ellen, Setsuna, and Eve, who were in the vicinity. Her qualities not only surpass Heroes, but even the Demon King Candidate Eve.

== Media ==
=== Light novels ===
The series was first published online in December 2016 on the user-generated novel publishing website Shōsetsuka ni Narō by Rui Tsukiyo. It was later acquired by Kadokawa Shoten, who published the first volume as a light novel under their Kadokawa Sneaker Bunko imprint in July 2017.

On January 23, 2021, Tsukiyo tweeted in English, claiming that one overseas publisher refused to publish the series in English. They said that the situation may change if overseas publishers received enough requests. Tsukiyo also encouraged fans to check out the English version of their other light novel series, The World's Finest Assassin Gets Reincarnated in Another World as an Aristocrat, which is licensed by Yen Press.

==== Volumes ====
No.	Japanese release date	Japanese ISBN
1	July 1, 2017	978-4-04-105680-6
2	December 1, 2017	978-4-04-105681-3
3	April 1, 2018	978-4-04-106524-2
4	September 1, 2018	978-4-04-106521-1
5	February 1, 2019	978-4-04-107559-3
6	July 1, 2019	978-4-04-107560-9
7	December 1, 2019	978-4-04-107561-6
8	July 1, 2020	978-4-04-109658-1
9	December 26, 2020	978-4-04-109662-8
10	March 29, 2024	978-4-04-109663-5

=== Manga ===
A manga adaptation by Sōken Haga began serialization in Kadokawa Shoten's Young Ace Up website on October 24, 2017. Nineteen volumes have been released as of November 2026.

A spin-off manga series illustrated by Ken Nagao, titled Kaifuku Jutsushi no Omotenashi (Hospitality of Healer), was serialized in Young Ace Up from January 18, 2021, to May 23, 2022, and collected into two volumes.

No.	Japanese release date	Japanese ISBN
1	March 31, 2018	978-4-04-106838-0
2	September 4, 2018	978-4-04-107292-9
3	February 4, 2019	978-4-04-107730-6
4	July 4, 2019	978-4-04-108358-1
5	December 3, 2019	978-4-04-108359-8
6	May 2, 2020	978-4-04-109347-4
7	October 10, 2020	978-4-04-109350-4
8	February 10, 2021	978-4-04-109352-8
9	August 10, 2021	978-4-04-111575-6
10	February 10, 2022	978-4-04-111579-4
11	August 10, 2022	978-4-04-112627-1
12	February 10, 2023	978-4-04-113257-9
13	August 10, 2023	978-4-04-113906-6
14	February 9, 2024	978-4-04-114516-6
15	August 9, 2024	978-4-04-115171-6
16	January 10, 2025	978-4-04-115684-1
17	October 10, 2025	978-4-04-116308-5
18	May 8, 2026	978-4-04-117131-8
19	November 10, 2026	978-4-04-117851-5

=== Anime ===
An anime television series adaptation was announced by Kadokawa in November 2019. The series was animated by TNK and directed by Takuya Asaoka, with Kazuyuki Fudeyasu handling series composition, and Junji Goto designing the characters. The series aired for twelve episodes from January 13 to March 31, 2021, on AT-X, Tokyo MX, KBS, SUN, and BS11. The opening theme is "Cruel Dreams and Sleep" (残酷な夢と眠れ, Zankoku na Yume to Nemure) performed by Minami Kuribayashi, while the ending theme is "If You Can Change the World in a Dream" (夢で世界を変えるなら, Yume de Sekai o Kaeru Nara) performed by ARCANA PROJECT.

There are three different versions of the anime: a censored broadcast version, a streaming-exclusive "Redo" version, and an uncensored "Complete Recovery" version. All of the stations airing the anime carried the broadcast version. In addition to airing the broadcast version at 11:30 p.m. JST, AT-X aired the "Complete Recovery" version on the same morning at 4:00 a.m. JST. The official Twitter account issued a content warning for the anime. Sentai Filmworks has licensed the anime outside Asia and German-speaking regions.

==== Episodes ====
No.	Title (Note: All English titles are taken from Hidive.)	Directed by	Storyboarded by	Original release date
1	"The Healer Starts Over!"; Transliteration: "Kaifuku Jutsushi wa, Yarinaosu!" (Japanese: 回復術士は、やり直す！)	Norihiko Nagahama	Takuya Asaoka; Ryō Tanaka	January 13, 2021
A young man, Keyaru, hears a voice inside his head directing him to a Star Spirit, who grants him the Halcyon Eye power to see all creation. In a previous life, Keyaru was a healing magician for the tyrannical kingdom Jioral, but his power forced him to endure the painful memories of those he healed. He was captured, abused, and forced to heal his captors in battle. In secret, he grew stronger absorbing the experiences of his abusers and learned to use healing magic in unconventional ways. Eventually, he escaped, defeated a Demon Lord, and used her Philosopher's Stone to travel back in time in the past with the intention to get revenge on his abusers and bring down Jioral. With his past memories gained despite being warned that he could lose them, Keyaru swears revenge on his main abuser, Princess Flare of the Jioral Kingdom. Flare, who has no memory of these events, senses his awakening and declares him the Recovery Hero. He is brought to the kingdom where they meet Proum, Flare's father and the king of Jioral. Deciding not to blow his cover until Proum is gone due to how powerful he is, Keyaru takes advantage of the maids in the royal household who have sex with him. Keyaru regenerates the amputated arm of grateful swordswoman Kureha, but pretends to pass out. Flare callously orders the court magician to gain control of Keyaru, no matter how torturous the method. Confirming Flare is still as cruel as she was previously, Keyaru begins planning his revenge.
2	"The Healer Ruins Princess Flare!"; Transliteration: "Kaifuku Jutsushi wa, Furea Ōjo o Kowasu!" (Japanese: 回復術士は、フレア王女を壊す！)	Takuya Asaoka	Takuya Asaoka	January 20, 2021
Pretending to be afraid of absorbing painful memories, Keyaru swears never to heal again and pretends to allow Flare to imprison and pretends to get addicted to drugs to further fool her. Flare begins forcing Keyaru to heal injured warriors, while Keyaru secretly copies magical abilities from them. When Proum is absent and Keyaru becomes immune to drugs, he uses his stolen abilities to escape and disguise himself as Leonard, Flare's Imperial Commander (having subdued the real Leonard and altered his face to resemble his own so that he gets captured and thrown into the dungeon in his place), and, once alone with Flare, removes his disguise and heals away her ability to use magic, rendering her defenseless and unable to walk. After repeatedly breaking then healing her fingers, Keyaru rapes Flare before he heals her in order to alter her appearance and memories. After healing a dead bodyguard's face to look like Flare, Keyaru frames Leonard before he escapes with the real Flare, tricking the entire kingdom into thinking that Flare was murdered. Keyaru decides to target his other abusers, Bullet and Blade, before seeking out the Demon Lord he previously defeated to find out what she had been trying to protect when she died. With Flare now an amnesiac, Keyaru renames her Freia, convinces her she is his servant and lover while he changes his face and takes the hero name Keyarga the Healer, leaving his weak name Keyaru behind. The two then have sex and Freia, despite not being able to remember her past, pledges allegiance to Keyarga.
3	"The Healer Buys a Slave!"; Transliteration: "Kaifuku Jutsushi wa, Dorei o Kau!" (Japanese: 回復術士は、奴隷を買う！)	Satoshi Saga	Katsuhiko Nishijima	January 27, 2021
Keyarga decides he and Freia must leave the city. However, he also learns that Norn, Flare's younger, strategist, and sadistic sister, is returning to the city (having left sometime prior to Keyarga's arrival in the kingdom) and he is determined to avoid her. Keyarga has a nightmare of his previous life: every night, Flare would force him to pleasure her. Second, the Sword Heroine, Blade, would beat him for touching Flare before sexually assaulting him since she could not sleep with Flare herself. Finally, Bullet, the Gun Hero, would violently rape him, claiming to love him before choking him unconscious. They later arrive at Lanaritta, a lawless city dominated by criminals who prey on the poor. With Halcyon Eye, Keyarga detects the town's water is contaminated, making whoever drinks it sick. Using his own antibodies, Keyarga creates a cure from his blood and sells it to a merchant, promising to continue making more in exchange for half the profits. He next visits a slave trader and purchases a female ice wolf demi-human, noting that her rage has kept her conscious despite being infected and is interested in what will happen once she gets revenge against whoever she hates so much.
4	"The Healer Acquires Setsuna!"; Transliteration: "Kaifuku Jutsushi wa, Setsuna o Te ni Ireru!" (Japanese: 回復術士は、セツナを手に入れる！)	Akira Shimizu	Tetsuya Yanagisawa	February 3, 2021
Keyarga examines the girl's memories and learns she wants revenge against the Jioral Kingdom because they are planning to take her village as slaves. Knowing the girl, Setsuna, has no warrior abilities, Keyarga offers to make her stronger using a skill stolen from another hero, but requires her true name to do it. Setsuna agrees, even though knowing her true name will give him control over her. To prove he can make her stronger, Keyarga has sex with Setsuna. Making their way to Setsuna's village, they find Jioral soldiers torturing prisoners. Keyarga disguises himself as a Sword Hero and kills them while Freia gives him covering fire. Setsuna gets revenge by killing the soldier who enslaved her. Afterward, Keyarga shows Setsuna that the ice wolves poisoned the water and gives her a choice: either make the poison strong enough to kill every human in Lanaritta or replace the poison with medicine. Setsuna chooses the medicine. They have sex again and Setsuna willingly tells Keyarga her true name. In Jioral, Norn returns and reveals that Keyarga altered Leonard's face to look like him to cover up his escape. Believing that Flare was murdered, Proum orders Leonard to find the real Keyarga.
5	"The Healer Finds a New Toy!"; Transliteration: "Kaifuku Jutsushi wa, Atarashii Omocha o Mitsukeru!" (Japanese: 回復術士は、新しいおもちゃを見つける！)	Hodaka Kuramoto	Koichi Ohata	February 10, 2021
After Keyarga has sex with both Freia and Setsuna, they return to Lanaritta where the merchant attempts to force Keyarga to reveal the formula for the cure so he can get the profits alone. Keyarga gives him a fake formula, pointing out to his companions that with the contaminated water cured, the illness will go away anyway. Kureha appears and challenges him, believing that he attacked the Jioral soldiers at Setsuna's village unprovoked, unaware of what the soldiers were really doing. Freia tries to help, but is quickly overpowered. After a grand sword battle, Keyarga douses her with an aphrodisiac and then, after she slices his arm off, regenerates his arm and heals her mind to share the memories of the soldiers' atrocities against Setsuna's village, causing her to pass out. When she wakes up, he reveals he is Keyaru, the one who healed her arm, then brings in Freia whom he told to pretend to be Flare in order to convince her that he is telling the truth. "Flare" tells Kureha that Jioral is corrupt and Keyarga faked her death to save her life after Leonard found out about their scheme to expose Jioral's crimes, making Kureha realize that she was fighting on the wrong side. Struck with remorse over her mistake and exposed to the aphrodisiac again, Kureha offers her body and they have sex. She falls in love with him and he gloats that she will now do whatever he says. Meanwhile, Leonard is on their trail.
6	"The Healer Sheds Blood and Tears!"; Transliteration: "Kaifuku Jutsushi wa, Chi to Namida o Nagasu!" (Japanese: 回復術士は、血と涙を流す！)	Ryō Ōkubo	Tetsuya Yanagisawa	February 17, 2021
Freia and Setsuna become increasingly jealous of Keyarga and Kureha's relationship. The group learns troops led by Leonard have captured the inhabitants of Keyaru's village. Keyarga sends Kureha to investigate, then disguises himself and infiltrates Leonard's squad. When he learns Leonard had tortured and raped his childhood friend, Anna, an enraged Keyarga captures Leonard and transforms him into a woman before having his brainwashed squad gang rape him, then kills them all by setting the room on fire. Keyarga finds Anna and tries to heal her, but she succumbs to her injuries. Distraught, Keyarga has sex with Freia and Setsuna for solace. Kureha returns and reports that the villagers will be publicly executed for supporting the Recovery Hero and that Norn has returned from abroad. Keyarga is wary of Norn as he remembers how she was more competent and manipulative than Flare. When the public execution begins, Keyarga reveals himself to save his villagers.
7	"The Healer Executes Justice!"; Transliteration: "Kaifuku Jutsushi wa, Seigi o Shikkō Suru!" (Japanese: 回復術士は、正義を執行する！)	Ryōichi Kuraya	Koichi Ohata	February 24, 2021
Keyarga begins to slaughter the executioners and does not stop even when they start killing the villagers. The executioners try to use a magical barrier to drain his strength, but Freia reverses the effect. Keyarga learns the villagers were fed poison earlier so they were already dying; he is only able to save one boy. Freia reveals herself, pretending to be Flare, and reveals the corruption in Jioral, causing the audience to turn on the executioners and kill them. Aware the boy blames him for everything that happened to the village, Keyarga tells the merchant to care for him. Kureha leaves to continue spying on the kingdom and warns him that Norn and her army are headed for the city of Branica. Keyarga notes that Norn never went to Branica in his first life. Meanwhile, Norn learns that Flare is still alive and is now working with Keyarga. Keyarga decides to go to Branica as well because the Demon Lord will be there and he wants to meet her again. Along the way, they make camp and Keyarga has sex with Freia and Setsuna. Freia says she will kill anyone who stands in his way, causing Keyarga to realize that excluding her devotion to him, her personality is not that different from Flare's.
8	"The Healer Meets the Demon Lord!"; Transliteration: "Kaifuku Jutsushi wa, Maō to Deau!" (Japanese: 回復術士は、魔王と出会う！)	Kinji Yoshimoto	Katsuhiko Nishijima	March 3, 2021
Freia's incredible power causes her magic staves to eventually break, so Keyarga decides they will one day have to acquire divine weapons that can handle it. The party arrives at Branica where humans and other races live in harmony unlike in other places. At a restaurant, they meet Eve Reese, the Demon Lord whom Keyarga met and defeated in his first life, but she is less powerful and her hair is black instead of silver, unlike he remembered, causing him to realize she is not yet the Demon Lord. She is a member of the Black Wing Tribe, whom the current Demon Lord ordered to be eradicated. Bounty hunters attack her and she is hit by a paralyzing arrow, but Keyarga's party rescues and heals her. While hiding out, Keyarga explains to Eve that he met her in the future and she will become the Demon Lord, offering to protect her until she claims her destiny. She does not believe him but agrees to stay with the group. Later that night, Eve wakes up and is shocked and embarrassed to find Keyarga having sex with Freia and Setsuna right in front of her. Keyarga invites her to join them and taunts her to prove she is a grown-up.
9	"The Healer Takes Revenge for a Meal!"; Transliteration: "Kaifuku Jutsushi wa, Tabemono no Urami o Harasu!" (Japanese: 回復術士は、食べ物の恨みを晴らす！)	Satoshi Saga	Tetsuya Yanagisawa	March 10, 2021
Eve turns down Keyarga's offer, but he, Freia, and Setsuna scold her. Keyarga says once she becomes the Demon Lord, he wants the Philosopher's Stone and for her to secure peace between humans and demons. While discussing their combat capabilities, Eve explains she can summon the legendary, disease-spreading bird, Caladrius, but she will have to endure several trials, including traveling all around the world, to make it obey her. Keyarga disguises himself and scouts the city, but a bounty hunter recognizes him due to his scent, forcing Keyarga to kill him. Keyarga returns and has sex with Freia and Setsuna. Embarrassed, Eve leaves the room, but, aroused, listens and masturbates, so Keyarga notes it is only a matter of time before she gives in to his advances. Keyarga and Setsuna track down the bounty hunters and massacre them. As payback for them destroying the restaurant, they leave the survivors in a pit to be devoured by a beast. Freia buys a magic staff and Keyarga improves it. When he improves the other staves in the store, the owner gives him some money back and a mithril sword. Keyarga is furious when Norn, her army, and Blade arrive in Branica.
10	"The Healer Becomes a Single, Lovely Flower!"; Transliteration: "Kaifuku Jutsushi wa, Karen na Ichirin no Hana ni Naru!" (Japanese: 回復術士は、可憐な一輪の花になる！)	Kenichi Ishikura	Ryōichi Kuraya	March 17, 2021
Keyarga retreats when he notices Norn and Blade are accompanied by a powerful knight named Hawkeye. That night, Blade rapes and tortures a girl. Keyarga sells some potions to Karman, the store owner, who warns him about the girl's fate. After having sex with Freia and Setsuna, Keyarga decides to use himself as bait, transforming into a woman named Keara. At a pub, Blade is enticed by Keara and offers her a drink. Blade transfers a sleeping potion via a kiss and Keara pretends to pass out. While Blade carries her to her hotel, the father of the girl whom Blade raped attacks her, forcing Keara to knock him out to save his life and then fight Blade. However, Blade's sword, Ragnarok, enhances her strength and allows her to heal from injuries. Keara is knocked out cold and later wakes up tied to Blade's bed. Blade prepares to rape her but is horrified to discover Keara has a penis. Dropping her hapless act, Keara breaks her bonds and stabs Blade with a poisoned dagger. Blade attempts to grab Ragnarok to heal herself, but is stabbed again and passes out. Keara declares it is time for revenge.
11	"The Healer is Troubled by Norn's Brutality!"; Transliteration: "Kaifuku Jutsushi wa, Norun Hime no Bankō ni Kokoro o Itameru!" (Japanese: 回復術士は、ノルン姫の蛮行に心を痛める！ (Note: The title is written as 回復術士は、ノルンの蛮行に心を痛める！ in the episode.))	Shunji Yoshida	Koichi Ohata	March 24, 2021
Keara reads Blade's memories and learns Norn plans to attack Branica in three days. After paralyzing Blade's legs, she has three brainwashed men gang-rape her. The men then kill and eat her, causing Ragnarok to revert to a gem. After reverting to his true form, Keyarga meets Trist Organ, aka Hawkeye, who is a Jioral knight with powerful skills. Hawkeye is impressed by the potions he sold to Karman and invites him to join his army, but he declines. Realizing Hawkeye is too powerful for him, Keyarga connects with the gem to form a new weapon; it transforms into a clawed gauntlet called Georgius that can heal the user's injuries. Keyarga celebrates by having sex with Freia and Setsuna while Eve masturbates in the room this time. On the third day, Norn becomes tired of searching for Blade and dismisses her as worthless. Accusing the demons of Branica of brainwashing humans into accepting them, Norn commands her army to kill everyone. Keyarga is furious when Karman is killed and begins to slaughter the soldiers. Norn and Hawkeye are shocked when Freia, pretending to be Flare, projects a giant hologram of herself in the sky.
12	"The Healer Starts a New Journey!"; Transliteration: "Kaifuku Jutsushi wa, Arata Naru Tabi ni Deru!" (Japanese: 回復術士は、新たなる旅に出る！)	Takuya Asaoka; Ryō Ōkubo	Takuya Asaoka; Katsuhiko Nishijima	March 31, 2021
Freia says non-humans are not the enemy and asks the soldiers to stand down, which they do. As Norn and Hawkeye express confusion, Keyarga breaks in and battles Hawkeye. Despite being equally matched, Keyarga successfully kills him, then knocks out Norn and imprisons her in an underground cellar. Afterward, he reads her memories and learns she was responsible for Leonard attacking his village. When she wakes up, he expresses his anger towards her for the destruction of his village and the deaths of his friends. He drugs Freia into acting like a dog, then promises if she can withstand Freia licking her without orgasming until morning, he will release her. Norn fails the challenge, so he and Freia rape her. He then erases and alters Norn's memories and appearance and turns her into Ellen, his little sister who is in love with him, and turns Freia back to normal. Kureha arrives and Keyarga introduces Ellen. Keyarga has sex with Freia, Setsuna, Ellen, and Kureha while Eve masturbates. He decides his party will travel until they can help Eve tame Caladrius, but pauses to lay flowers on Karman's grave, saying he avenged him and Anna. With Jioral now in disarray following Leonard, Blade, and Hawkeye's deaths and Flare and Norn's supposed murders, a vengeful Proum assigns Bullet to stop Keyarga, and Bullet is eager to rape him again. Keyarga realizes he is starting to care for his girls, but decides he will never know peace until he gets revenge on Bullet and put an end to Jioral's tyranny.

== Reception ==
=== Light novel and manga ===
The light novel series has over 800,000 copies in print. Both the light novel and the manga grew in their popularity, which led to an increase in digital sales. Several volumes of the manga also ranked in the top ten of Amazon Japan's manga charts.

=== Anime ===
Since its airing, the anime adaptation of Redo of Healer gained higher than average percentage of female viewers and Tsukiyo expressed their surprise on Twitter.

In Anime News Network's Winter 2021 Preview Guide, the series was panned by most of the reviewers for its recurring "rape and revenge". The reviewers criticized the series for having a "generic" fantasy role-playing game inspired setting similar to popular isekai series and for "contrived" in-story justifications for its revenge plot.

The series garnered controversy, particularly due to its depiction of extreme violence, gratuitous amounts of sexual content, rape and slavery, most elements often being used as a plot device, especially in the first two episodes. These were aspects of the light novels that gained controversy before the anime adaptation premiered.
