= List of Hundred episodes =

Hundred
- Cover art for the first Blu-ray volume, featuring Emilia Hermit.
- Native name
- Kanji: ハンドレッド
- Revised Hepburn: Handoreddo
- No. of episodes: 12

Release
- Original network: TV Tokyo, AT-X, BS Japan
- Original release: April 6 – June 20, 2016

Hundred is based on the light novel series of the same name written by Jun Misaki and illustrated by Nekosuke Ōkuma. The series adaptation was announced in the ninth volume's cover. It was produced by Production IMS and directed by Tomoki Kobayashi. It aired from April 5 to June 20, 2016. The opening theme is "Bloodred" by D-Selections, and the first ending theme is "Eyes On Me" by Rumi Ōkubo and Mayu Yoshioka. The second ending theme is "Tabooless" by M.A.O, Rika Kinugawa, and Yui Makino. The third ending theme is "Hardy Buddy" by Yuka Ōtsubo and Wataru Hatano. The fourth ending theme is "Jewels of Love" by Mayu Yoshioka and Kaya Okuno. Funimation has licensed the series in North America.

== Episode list ==
No.	Title	Original release date
1	"Little Garden"; Transliteration: "Ritoru Gāden" (Japanese: リトルガーデン)	April 5, 2016
Hayato Kisaragi is a student going to the Little Garden to go to school, where he is training to become a Slayer, a human being who can defeat monsters known as Savages, which are endangering the lives of other fellow human beings. As he exits from the plane, two girls from the school rush to meet him but he hides from them out of embarrassment. However, he later attracts attention at the school campus due to his high scores. There, he meets fellow first-year students Fritz Granz, Latia Saint-Emilion, and Emile Crossfode. As Hayato begins to feel welcomed at the school, the two girls become late to the entrance ceremony as they were looking for him, and they are expelled then and thereby the Student Council President and the Captain of the Little Garden, Claire Harvey. At this, Emile speaks up and rebuffs Claire, much to the anger of the Student Council Vice-Presidents Liddy Steinberg and Erica Candle. However, Claire turns to Hayato instead, who musters his courage and says that he feels that the students should not be expelled. Claire then challenges him to a one-on-one duel to determine the students' fates. After the entrance ceremony, Emile takes Hayato to see her friend, the technician of the Little Garden, Charlotte Dimandias. At her lab, she reveals herself to also be the Chief Researcher on Hundreds, special gems that can grant powers to humans, turning them into Slayers. She gives Hayato his Hundred, which reacts to him almost immediately. Seeing this, Emile takes Hayato to the training grounds to train him for the upcoming duel. Later, he goes to put his luggage in his dormitory and accidentally spots Emile wearing nothing but a towel. He is then knocked out by him. He then learns that he and Emile are roommates.
2	"The Invincible Queen"; Transliteration: "Zettai Muteki no Pāfekuto Kuīn" (Japanese: 絶対無敵の女王(パーフェクトクイーン))	April 12, 2016
The duel begins early next morning, and all of the students have gathered at the auditorium to watch. There, Liddy explains the rules. The duel will last 15 minutes and will end once one of them is knocked out, when one of their energy is used up or when one of them is disarmed. However, as the duel begins, Hayato accidentally falls over her and grabs Claire's breasts, angering her and firing shots at him. Hayato puts up an energy barrier on Emile's command and deals a heavy shot at Claire. However, this does not affect her as she puts up her shield with her numerous cannons, and deals the final blow. This causes Hayato to lose a lot of his energy and as he slowly rises, Claire prepares to use a Buster Cannon against him, shocking everyone and even the Student Council Vice-Presidents. As she shoots, Hayato feels that his body has turned hot, and manages to deflect Claire's blow, pushing her back with different movements, and ends up using a full-body armament, the full release of his Hundred powers. In the end, he is still defeated by Claire using her full-body armament even though she said she would not at the start of the match, as he is unable to control his powers and collapses. The match is thus declared a tie as, Claire won officially, but lost to herself. Claire then cancels the expulsion of the girls. After Hayato recovers, Emile takes him to Central, the business district of the Little Garden, where Karen, Hayato's sister, comes to meet them to check on Hayato after the duel. She begins to suspect that Emile is a girl but leaves it at that, giving him a warning. They then have lunch but are interrupted by Claire, Liddy, Erica, and Chris Steinbelt, Claire's assistant. Claire then recruits Hayato into The Selections, the special unit under the student council, much to Emile's objection. Emile then wishes to join Hayato, and transforms then and there, willing to prove himself. The duel between him and Liddy ends abruptly due to a Savage alert on Zwei Islands.
3	"Variant Awakening"; Transliteration: "Varianto Kakusei" (Japanese: ヴァリアント覚醒)	April 19, 2016
Claire, Liddy, and Erica then take Hayato and Emile to a special private room, where dozens of other people are working. The current situation shows that they are presently tracking three Savages on Zwei Islands. At first, Claire was contemplating deploying Emile and Hayato, but after receiving the shocking reports on just merely one of the Savages, she refuses as they have no experience just yet even though they have Charlotte's recommendation. However, Charlotte says that LIZA, the main machine and power source of the Little Garden agrees that Hayato and Emile should join them. At this, Claire reconsiders and finally gives her approval. They then prepare to deal with the Savages. Claire, Liddy, and Erica finish off the first Savage first. Hayato and Emile then take on the next one and manage to defeat it by working together. However, the third Savage, the Trenton-class one and also the strongest one, proves to be more of a challenge, injuring Liddy and Erica badly. Hayato and Emile want to help, but Claire goes alone to beat it. She fires a strong blow at it, but it counters with its own. Claire prepares for another, but a beep from her wristband warns her that she does not have enough energy. As the Savage fires another deadly attack, she is saved by Hayato and managed to deflect the third blow with his help. Emile then lunges in to break its core, but her clothes are ripped by its heavy claw, revealing a thin scar and large breasts. The sight of the scar then triggers a distant memory in Hayato, and he remembers a girl with long white hair like Emile's, wearing a dress and bleeding profusely from a wound in her chest, a wound that was leaking with yellowish-green poison, the poison of a Savage. And then there was him, crying, and trying to suck out the poison. With a start, he then realizes that Emile wasn't a boy, or called Emile for that matter. With a cry, he rushes in to save his childhood friend, Emilia Hermit. Hayato releases his Variant powers in the process, and defeats the Savage, and collapses but is lifted by Emilia. She is then confronted by Claire, who is shocked at finding out that Emilia was originally just posing as a boy but was a girl. In the end, she reluctantly agrees to keep Emilia's true identity a secret but requests that Hayato and Emilia change rooms. However, her warning falls on deaf ears as she stumbles into the room to find her and Hayato kissing. As Hayato gets up with a start, he trips over Emilia's foot and stumbles towards Claire, kissing her in the process. This angers Emilia and a kissing match begins.
4	"Bodyguard"; Transliteration: "Bodīgādo" (Japanese: ボディーガード)	April 26, 2016
The popular singer Sakura Kirishima is looking for a bodyguard and Claire recommends Hayato. As there are more Savages still lurking on Zwei Islands, where Sakura is having her numerous concerts, Hayato has to go to her concert to take care of her. Liddy then brings him to the airport to meet her. Before that, Karen has requested that he bring her Sakura's autograph, and Hayato is determined not to let her down. Sakura proves to be different from what he expected as she falls in love with him and starts chattering about a wedding with all the details planned. Awkward as usual, poor Hayato can do nothing but listen. Later, when Sakura goes to the bath and then requests Hayato bring in her PDA to record a good tune, he is reminded strongly of Karen, how she used to sing in the bath and how she left her clothes all over the place. After the bath, Sakura handles all her autograph signings, her fan meetings, and numerous other events, impressing Hayato. Later on, she also shows him her Hundred, in which she takes the form of something like a fairy. After a long day, Hayato receives a phone call from Claire, telling him to come to her summer house tomorrow morning. He then later go to the public baths to bathe, where he invites Emilia out for a trip to Zwei Islands, however, accidentally gropes her and she leaves angrily. Meanwhile, three people with glowing yellow eyes are seen to be hanging around the Zwei Islands, planning something after Sakura's concert.
5	"Imitation Girl"; Transliteration: "Imitēshon Gāru" (Japanese: イミテーション・ガール)	May 3, 2016
At her messy hotel room, Sakura thinks about her past with her mother and her words of wisdom: Music has the power to make people feel happy. Meanwhile, Hayato goes to Claire's summer house as requested, where he spots Claire, Liddy, and Erica all wearing swimsuits, causing him to blush furiously. When Claire stands up, Erica had taken off her bra to help her apply sunscreen lotion, causing a wildly embarrassing scene. Liddy, defensive as always, leaps from the pool towards Hayato, but slips and falls on him instead. This squabble all ends when Chris comes to bring Claire a cool drink and is appalled by the scene. After all the commotion, Claire finally gets to the matter at hand and explains to Hayato that a variable stone that Sakura was going to use in her concert was stolen amid the chaos that erupted when the three Savages appeared on Zwei Islands, telling him to be even more cautious in guarding Sakura. She also proposes a swimming contest, but Hayato denies it. After Claire's meeting, he goes to Central to meet Emilia for her date, but it is interrupted by a phone call from Claire, telling him that Sakura has disappeared from her hotel room. However, when Emilia went to buy drinks, he stumbles upon Sakura, who takes him to a 'special place'. Forced to do work, Hayato texts, Emilia, about the situation. It turns out Sakura brought him to the Grand Canyon, a special place in her heart that Hayato protected, and she wanted to thank him. Later, she finds out that when she lost her mother and begin singing, the sibling pair she met and praised her singing was Karen and Hayato, changing her life. Moved to tears, she repeatedly thanks Hayato and explains her past to him. She came down with a mysterious illness and was sold by her father to the Warslarn Research Facility, where Vitaly Tynyanov injected the children there, including Sakura, with a vaccine made from Savage fluids. It cured Sakura alright, but they continued doing it, no matter the side effects. There, Sakura sang to calm the children down. One by one, all of them died, leaving Sakura, who was rescued by Souffle and Charlotte. However, even though she has a Hundred, Sakura is unable to fight Savages. As evening approaches, Sakura and Hayato get on a bus to go back to Central. On the way, the bus is struck down by a Trenton-class Savage. As it raises its deadly claw, Sakura and Hayato are right in the way.
6	"The Diva's Love Song"; Transliteration: "Utahime no Rabu Songu" (Japanese: 歌姫のラブソング)	May 10, 2016
Hayato transforms and fights the Savage. Meanwhile, Claire, Liddy, and Erica have pinpointed Hayato's location and deduce that he has to hold it off until reinforcements arrive. Sakura helps Hayato by defending and tells him to attack while she cannot. This is a big help to Hayato and he defeats the Savage easily. However, a second Trenton-class Savage appears, and as Sakura tries to shield herself and Hayato from the Savage's deadly blast, gets knocked out momentarily. Thankfully, Fritz, Latia, and Emilia arrive and just as they are about to defeat the Savage, it regenerates its pincer. They work together once more to bring it down with Hayato's help, but suddenly, a young boy appears in front of him and deals a severe blow to Hayato, knocking him out. Another two girls appear, and one duplicates Hayato's weapon and they easily defeat the Savage. One of the girls manages to hack into the Savages' head and takes out two Savage cores. The trio then mentions bringing back the cores to Vitaly. Back at school, Charlotte explains that Savage cores are almost like variable stones, as they both make Hundreds. That night is Sakura's concert, and everyone goes to watch her sing. As she leaves, she kindly gives Karen her autograph and kisses Hayato, shocking everyone while promising to see him soon. Afterward, she indeed comes to see Hayato that morning when he wakes up. Claire barges in to find Sakura there and so does Emilia. There, a fighting match begins and all of them refuse to leave.
7	"The Captured Sleeping Beauty"; Transliteration: "Toraware no Ibarahime" (Japanese: 囚われの荊姫)	May 17, 2016
Hayato and his friends enjoy the beach when Claire's brother named Judal Harvey arrived via helicopter to pick up his sister. Later, Claire announces to Hayato, Emilia, Latia, and Fritz about a Savage cleanup operation to be conducted by them along with the United Nations peacekeeping force at the Empire of Qin. She later drafts the latter two to become official members of The Selections. Afterward, Judal invites Hayato to accompany him as they visit LIZA, which turned out to be his and Claire's younger sister named Liza Harvey in hibernation. Claire arrives with a gun and threatens her brother for revealing the secret but Judal reveals Hayato has divine blood that could help Liza gain consciousness. Judal asks Hayato to try to awaken their sister but to no avail. After the confrontation, Hayato promises Claire he will keep their younger sister's status a secret. Hayato and his friends then arrive at Tian Quan City, where he met a girl named Claudia Lowetti excitingly meeting Emilia. He then learns about the latter's status as the third princess of the Gudenburg Empire named Emilia Gudenburg. Claudia persuades her to return to the empire but Emilia declines because she wants to be with Hayato, causing a jealous Claudia to challenge him in a duel at a dojo. After he won the match against Claudia, Hayato accompanies Emilia as they visit a shopping district when the Hunters in hooded outfits passed by them.
8	"Night at the Lake"; Transliteration: "Kohan no Yoru" (Japanese: 湖畔の夜)	May 24, 2016
Claudia joins Hayato, Emilia, Claire, and Erica in their clearing of the mountain area from Savages. By the night falls, Hayato, Claire, and Claudia are tasked next to do night patrol after Emilia and Erica's turn. Claudia tricks Hayato and Claire to go on a date near a lake to make Emilia jealous but the latter is not convinced by the former's deception. After they spotted and defeated a Savage, Hayato and Claire arrive at a lake where she took a bath and revealed to him how her mother named Linis Harvey modified Liza's birth by injecting a Savage fluid to make her into a Variant. He then receives a distress call from a squad about the Hunters attacking them. Fritz manages to send a flare to request a reinforcement as his fellow squad members get knocked down and their Hundreds are taken by the Hunters who were present at Grand Canyon. Claire arrives in time to save Fritz's squad.
9	"Dragon Type"; Transliteration: "Shinshu" (Japanese: 新種)	May 31, 2016
One of the Hunters named Krovanh manages to defeat Claire as the rain starts to pour down, which rendered her Hundred useless. Hayato, Emilia, Erica, and Claudia arrive in time before Krovanh kills Claire. Emilia manages to knock down the other Hunters named Nakri and Nesat as Hayato fights Krovanh. During their battle, Hayato witness painful memories from Krovanh when they were in a child labor camp until their escape and eventual rescue by Vitaly. Their confrontation is interrupted by the sudden emergence of the dragon-type Savage from the lake. Krovanh offers a ceasefire in exchange for him to defeat the Savage and retrieve its core but he struggles to penetrate its shield until he gets knocked down. Claire pleads one of the Hunters to disable their jamming device for her to communicate with other squads as she proposes to use long-range Hundreds to be fired by the Slayers from different squads at the same time to penetrate the Savage's shield. Charlotte contacts Claire and suggests getting injected with a Savage virus from Hayato through kissing to enhance her attack. Claire follows her suggestion and orders the Slayers to redo their long-range attacks, destroying the shield in the process. Hayato delivers the finishing blow to defeat the Savage. Emilia then rescues him after he got plunged into the lake. As the rest of the Slayers return to Little Garden, Claire and Erica contemplate Judal's order to bring the three Hunters with them. Hayato regains consciousness in the ship's facility as Emilia, Karen, and Sakura visit him. Meanwhile, Vitaly is aloof for the three Hunters who failed to return as she sets her plan in motion.
10	"School Festa"; Transliteration: "Gakuen Fesuta" (Japanese: 学園祭(フェスタ))	June 6, 2016
Vitaly tests her coreless Savages against Slayers named Aly Harlech and Wendy Velvet, leading to their defeat. Back in Little Garden, Claire prepares for the upcoming second Garden Festa to celebrate the launch of the academy ship such as ordering automated cleaning robots while also giving Hayato an update about the three Hunters being taken care of. Sakura reveals she will perform on the day of the festival. Hayato, Emilia, Latia, and Fritz welcome visitors arriving from transport planes such as Claudia and Wendy. Hayato then visits Karen, only to find her preparing for the concert along with Sakura and receiving a Hundred from Charlotte. On the festival's opening day presented by Claire with her welcome message to visitors, Mei Mei prepares food for the Hunters while Hayato and Emilia visit a maid cafe hosted by Latia and Erica. The latter manages to make Emilia wear the same outfit and teases Hayato to touch her breast. Afterward, Hayato visits Karen before her performance when Judal came by to wish his sister and Sakura luck at their concert. He then watches Sakura's performance along with Emilia. Vitaly suddenly arrives and manages to infiltrate the venue with the help of a mind-controlled Wendy. Back at the concert, Hayato and Emilia witness Karen's debut of her Hundred called "Divine Card" and watch her singing. Vitaly listens to Karen's song somewhere and drops her cigarette before disappearing. An automated cleaning robot picks it up and flashes a red warning.
11	"Gardens Crisis"; Transliteration: "Gādenzu Kuraishisu" (Japanese: ガーデンズ・クライシス)	June 13, 2016
During the performance of Karen and Sakura, Claire is informed about the unconscious Wendy with no memories yet muttering about coreless Savages. On the other hand, Latia and Erica find a bee-type mecha but it blows up when they tried to restrain it. Erica then reports multiple explosions caused by those mechas that transformed from automated cleaning robots. Claire orders the postponement of the festival and an evacuation among visitors. Meanwhile, a bee-type mecha manages to sabotage the ship's air defense network for three transport planes to crash land on the deck. Claudia and her team confront coreless Savages, dubbed as Replicants, from the wreckage. Another plane descends from above to destroy the ship's barrier. Hayato and Emilia arrive at the headquarters and are informed of the situation then he offers to deal with Replicants trying to penetrate the shield. Erica and Latia continue to destroy bee-type mechas while Liddy and Fritz assist Claudia and her team in defeating Replicants on the deck. Vitaly visits the three Hunters and offers them their Hundreds but Krovanh rejects her plan because it involves hurting people, forcing her to brainwash them instead. Mei Mei arrives late and fights Vitaly but she gets shot as she witnesses the Hunters leaving her with their master.
12	"Friends"; Transliteration: "Nakama" (Japanese: 仲間)	June 20, 2016
Judal calls Claires and informs her that he would handle Vitaly as the latter begins to approach the sector where Liza was confined. Meanwhile, Mei Mei catches up with Vitaly and manages to destroy the device that controlled the Hunters, freeing them from her control. Vitaly leaves them and finally arrives at Liza's location where she got confronted by Judal. She reveals her plan to take revenge on him for making her fall in love with him and deceiving her by killing Liza and sinking Little Garden. Meanwhile, Replicants produce sound waves that immobilized Slayers. Vitaly starts to shoot Liza but it fails because she gets awaken from Sakura's song earlier and deflects the bullets. Judal then kills her. Liza appears in front of Sakura and Karen to tell the former about her song that could help Slayers and heal the latter. Sakura and Karen begin to sing to help Slayers regain their movement. Hayato destroys the remaining Replicant but it is still alive. The Hunters arrive to defeat it but Krovanh struggles to destroy it and gets injured, causing Nesat to use her tracing ability to replicate the Replicant. Her power starts to become unstable, which could result in a huge explosion. Meanwhile, Liza appears in front of Hayato and lends her power for him to save Little Garden. He then requests Claire to give him time to save Nesat before she begins to destroy her. After their fierce battle, Hayato manages to save Nesat. Claire is then thanked by Liza for saving Little Garden before she gets a chance to see her. Later night, Hayato and Emilia share a passionate kiss when their friends showed up at the scene. Claudia becomes enraged and accidentally blows Emilia's cover by calling her princess in front of others. Emilia then decides to reveal her secret as a girl and a princess. Her friends finally understand her identity and her relationship with Hayato, while also getting shocked by her royal status. Claire becomes jealous of the two and fires her Hundred's weapon on them. Both Hayato and a protea Emilia are sent flying.

== Home Media release ==
=== Japanese ===
Avex Pictures (Region 2 — Japan)
Volume	Episodes	Release date	Ref.
1	1–2	June 24, 2016	
2	3–4	July 29, 2016	
3	5–6	August 26, 2016	
4	7–8	September 30, 2016	
5	9–10	October 28, 2016	
6	11–12	November 25, 2016	

=== English ===
Funimation (Region 1/A — North America)
Volume	Episodes	Release date	Ref.
1	1–2	June 24, 2016	
