= Yuya Hozumi =

Japanese voice actor and singer

- 保住 有哉
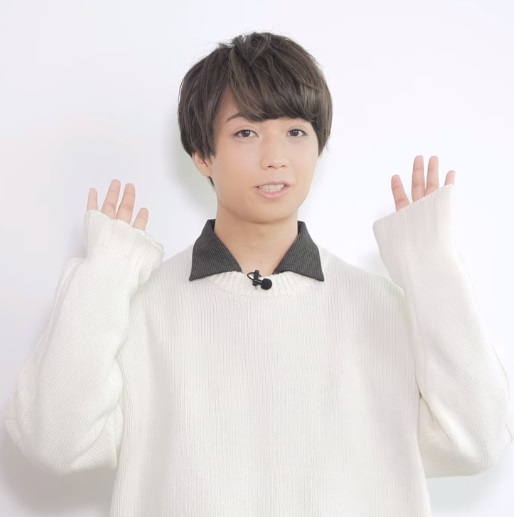
- Hozumi in 2019
- Born: 14 December 1993 (age 32)
- Occupation: Voice actor
- Years active: 2015–present
- Notable work: Actors: Songs Connection as Uta Outa; Redo of Healer as Keyarga; Seven Knights as Gildan
- Website: https://highpine.co.jp/talent/hozumi-yuya.html

Yuya Hozumi (Japanese: 保住 有哉, Hepburn: Hozumi Yūya; born 14 December 1993) is a Japanese voice actor and singer from Fukushima Prefecture, affiliated with High Pine. He is known for portraying Uta Outa in Actors: Songs Connection, Keyarga in Redo of Healer, and Gildan in Seven Knights. In addition to voice acting, he is also a member of the musical group SparQlew.

== Biography ==
Yuya Hozumi, a native of Fukushima Prefecture, was born on 14 December 1993. Inspired by the tokusatsu series Kamen Rider Kuuga and its star Joe Odagiri to seek an entertainment career, he chose a voice acting career after learning about voice acting in one of Kuuga's successor series, Kamen Rider Den-O. He was educated at the Tokyo Announce Gakuin Broadcasting and Voice Acting Department and at School Duo.

In March 2019, Hozumi was cast as Uta Outa in Actors: Songs Connection. In June 2020, he was cast as Keyarga in Redo of Healer. In February 2021, he was cast as Gildan in Seven Knights. In April 2022, he was cast as Kazuki Yamaguchi in Shoot! Goal to the Future. In January 2024, he was cast as Kaito Takagi in A Nobody's Way Up to an Exploration Hero.

On 19 November 2017, Hozumi joined the Lantis sub-label Kiramune as a member of the musical group SparQlew. His Actors: Songs Connection single, Character Song Vol. 6: Uta Outa, was released on 20 November 2019.

Hozumi attended Sentai Filmworks' Sentai at Home 2021 event in August 2021 alongside other Redo of Healer cast and crew members.

== Filmography ==
=== Animated television ===
Year	Series	Role	Ref.
2017	A Centaur's Life	deputy director	
2017	Dream Festival!	Nanao Hidaka	
2017	My Girlfriend Is Shobitch	Seishirō Kurono	
2017	Vatican Miracle Examiner	young John	
2018	Inazuma Eleven: Ares	Nao Oma, Kakeru Shimomachi	
2018	Legend of the Galactic Heroes: Die Neue These – Encounter	upperclassman	
2018	Zombie Land Saga	photo shoot guest C	
2019	Actors: Songs Connection	Uta Outa	
2019	Ensemble Stars!	male student	
2019	Pop Team Epic TV Special	guardian deity	
2020	Case File nº221: Kabukicho	young Sasuke	
2021	I'm Standing on a Million Lives	friend	
2021	Redo of Healer	Keyarga	
2021	Restaurant to Another World	Jonathan	
2021	Sakugan	staff	
2021	Seven Knights	Gildan	
2021	The World's Finest Assassin Gets Reincarnated in Another World as an Aristocrat	Beluid	
2022	Eternal Boys	friend, idol, young Nikolai Asakura, delinquent	
2022	Shoot! Goal to the Future	Kazuki Yamaguchi	
2023	Ayaka: A Story of Bonds and Wounds	male student C, Shizumaru Onda	
2023	Rokudo's Bad Girls	Yamada	
2024	A Nobody's Way Up to an Exploration Hero	Kaito Takagi	

=== Animated film ===
Year	Series	Role	Ref.
2015	Attack on Titan – Part 2: Wings of Freedom	training sergeant	
2015	Go! Princess Pretty Cure the Movie: Go! Go!! Gorgeous Triple Feature!!!	fairy, residents	
2015	Haikyu!!		
2016	Pretty Cure All Stars: Singing with Everyone♪ Miraculous Magic!		
2019	My Hero Academia: Heroes Rising		
2023	Hero of Robots: Brave Legacy	Lijia'erte	

=== Video games ===
Year	Series	Role	Ref.
2016	DCD Dorifesu!	Nanao Hidaka	
2018	Attack on Titan 2	soldiers, citizens, etc.	
2018	Demimen	Floris	
2018	Kyoutou Kotodaman	Onion, Mehistopheles, Hyacinth, etc.	
2019	SD Gundam G Generation Cross Rays	child soldier A	
2020	Final Fantasy VII Remake		
2020	GalaxyZ	Yuruka	
2020	Sanctus Senki: GYEE	Billy, Heart	
2021	Dragon Quest: The Adventure of Dai: Tamashii no Kizuna	player voice	
2024	Tokyo Debunker	Kurosagi Leo	
