= A Nobody's Way Up to an Exploration Hero =

Japanese light novel series and its adaptations

- First light novel volume cover

モブから始まる探索英雄譚 (Mob kara Hajimaru Tansaku Eiyūtan)
- Genre: Romantic comedy Fantasy
- Novel series
- Written by: Kaitō
- Published by: Shōsetsuka ni Narō
- Original run: April 9, 2019 – present
- Light novel
- Written by: Kaitō
- Illustrated by: Almic
- Published by: Hobby Japan
- Imprint: HJ Bunko
- Original run: July 1, 2021 – present
- Volumes: 13
- Manga
- Written by: Kaitō
- Illustrated by: Terio Teri
- Published by: Akita Shoten
- Imprint: Young Champion Comics
- Magazine: Dokodemo Young Champion
- Original run: August 24, 2021 – present
- Volumes: 6
- Anime television series
- Directed by: Tomoki Kobayashi
- Written by: Kazuyuki Fudeyasu
- Music by: Keiji Inai
- Studio: Gekkou
- Licensed by: Crunchyroll (streaming); SEA: Muse Communication
- Original network: Tokyo MX, KTN, BS NTV, AT-X
- Original run: July 6, 2024 – September 21, 2024
- Episodes: 12
- icon

A Nobody's Way Up to an Exploration Hero (モブから始まる探索英雄譚, Mob kara Hajimaru Tansaku Eiyūtan; "The Story of an Exploration Hero Who Has Worked His Way Up from Common People") is a Japanese light novel series written by Kaitō and illustrated by Almic. It began serialization online in April 2019 on the user-generated novel publishing website Shōsetsuka ni Narō. It was later acquired by Hobby Japan, who have published thirteen volumes since July 2021 under their HJ Bunko imprint. A manga adaptation with art by Terio Teri has been serialized in Akita Shoten's seinen manga web magazine Dokodemo Young Champion since August 2021 and has been collected in six tankōbon volumes. An anime television series adaptation produced by Gekkou aired from July to September 2024.

== Premise ==
In an alternate version of the modern world featuring fantasy dungeons and other role-playing video game mechanics, Kaito Takagi is a high school student who hunts weak slime monsters on the first floor of a dungeon as a part-time job. One day, he defeats a golden slime that drops an extremely rare Servant Card, allowing him to summon Sylphy, a Valkyrie with powerful magic.

== Characters ==
Kaito Takagi (高木 海斗, Takagi Kaito)
Voiced by: Yuya Hozumi
Main protagonist of the story and a low level adventurer who remains on the first floor after hearing his two male friends from school explain how they quit after running into a goblin on the second floor. He remains happy on the first floor, killing slimes and makes it up to 999 slimes. His 1,000th slime is a golden slime that drops a summoning card for a Valkyrie. He later finds and defeats a silver slime that rewards him with a Demon.
Sylphy (シルフィー, Shirufī)
Voiced by: Kana Hanazawa
A Valkyrie who is rewarded to Kaito after killing his 1,000th slime and earning him the title Slime Slayer. She is a short statured young woman who resembles an older child. She wears silver armor and she has blue hair with blue eyes. Her main skills are offensive lightning and a defensive barrier that she can create. She often shows jealousy toward Luceria and is very sensitive and encouraging to Kaito. Kaito eventually gives her the nickname Syl.
Haruka Katsuragi (葛城 春香, Katsuragi Haruka)
Voiced by: Azumi Waki
A childhood friend and neighbor to Kaito. She often discourages Kaito from going to the local dungeon. Her father helped to inspire Kaito to go down to the dungeon and become an explorer.
Luceria (ルシェリア, Rusheria)
Voiced by: Mayu Sagara
A demon summon rewarded to Kaito after killing a silver slime. Unlike the more reserved and nurturing Syl, Luceria is blunt and at first bemoans being the summon of Kaito. Like other summons, she requires the crystals dropped by monsters, but she has a habit of always asking for more crystals despite her workload. She has dark hair and resembles an older child. Kaito eventually gives her the nickname Luce. Her skills involve strong fire magic and disintegrating ability.
Airi Jingūji (神宮寺 愛理, Jingūji Airi)
Voiced by: Yoshino Aoyama
A female adventurer who Kaito meets in the dungeon along with her two female party members. She uses a naginata and has trained in her family dojo to use it as she dreams of becoming a hero. This dream is one she shares with Kaito. Eventually Kaito joins her party so they can clear more levels in the dungeon. She is a first year in college and attends the college that is the first choice for Katsuragi. She becomes infatuated with Kaito the more time she spends with him.
Miku Moriyama (森山 ミク, Moriyama Miku)
Voiced by: Saika Kitamori
Hikari Tanabe (田辺 光梨, Tanabe Hikari)
Voiced by: Azusa Tsugimori

== Media ==
=== Light novel ===
Written by Kaitō, A Nobody's Way Up to an Exploration Hero began serialization on the user-generated novel publishing website Shōsetsuka ni Narō on April 9, 2019. It was later acquired by Hobby Japan which began releasing it in July 2021 under its HJ Bunko imprint with illustrations by Almic. Fourteen volumes have been released as of September 1, 2026.

No.	Release date	ISBN
1	July 1, 2021	978-4-79-862436-5
2	September 1, 2021	978-4-79-862580-5
3	December 1, 2021	978-4-79-862679-6
4	April 1, 2022	978-4-79-862801-1
5	September 30, 2022	978-4-79-862921-6
6	April 1, 2023	978-4-79-863149-3
7	September 29, 2023	978-4-79-863313-8
8	February 1, 2024	978-4-79-863405-0
9	July 1, 2024	978-4-7986-3584-2
10	November 1, 2024	978-4-7986-3670-2
11	March 1, 2025	978-4-7986-3781-5
12	September 1, 2025	978-4-7986-3924-6
13	January 30, 2026	978-4-7986-4062-4
14	September 1, 2026	978-4-7986-4218-5

=== Manga ===
A manga adaptation illustrated by Terio Teri began serialization in Akita Shoten's seinen manga web magazine Dokodemo Young Champion on August 24, 2021. Its chapters have been collected into six tankōbon volumes as of March 2026.

No.	Release date	ISBN
1	February 18, 2022	978-4-253-30681-2
2	May 18, 2023	978-4-253-30682-9
3	December 27, 2023	978-4-253-30683-6
4	July 25, 2024	978-4-253-30684-3
5	March 27, 2025	978-4-253-30685-0
6	March 26, 2026	978-4-253-01047-4

=== Anime ===
An anime television series adaptation was announced in December 2023. It is produced by Gekkou and directed by Tomoki Kobayashi, with Kazuyuki Fudeyasu handling series composition, Shoko Yasuda designing the characters, and Keiji Inai composing the music. The series aired from July 6 to September 21, 2024, on Tokyo MX and other networks. The opening theme song is "Up Start" performed by Amatsuki, while the ending theme song is "Strobe Fantasy" (ストロボ・ファンタジー) performed by May'n. Crunchyroll streamed the series. Muse Communication licensed the series in Southeast Asia.

==== Episodes ====
No.	Title	Directed by (Note: Production staff information is taken from the ending credits of each episode.)	Written by	Storyboarded by	Original release date
1	"This Nobody Will Become a Hero"; Transliteration: "Sono Mobu wa Eiyū o Mezasu" (Japanese: そのモブは英雄を目指す)	Kentarō Iino	Kazuyuki Fudeyasu	Tomoki Kobayashi	July 6, 2024
Kaito is a frail boy who hunts slime on the 1st level of the city's dungeon. One day he finds and defeats a golden slime which leaves behind a special summoning card which changes Kaito's life forever.
2	"The Second Servant Card"; Transliteration: "Ni-mai Me no Sābanto Kādo" (Japanese: 2枚目のサーバントカード)	Kentaro Iino	Kazuyuki Fudeyasu	Shin'ichi Watanabe	July 13, 2024 (Note: From Episode 2 onwards, episodes are released on select platforms (such as ABEMA, Crunchyroll and simulcast platforms by Muse Communication) one week before their televised airings.)
3	"The Viscount-Class Demon and Sylphy's Worries"; Transliteration: "Shishaku-kyū Akuma to Shirufī no Nayami" (Japanese: 子爵級悪魔とシルフィーの悩み)	Tomonori Mine	Masanao Akahoshi	Tomonori Mine	July 20, 2024
4	"Hidden Dungeon"; Transliteration: "Kakushi Danjon" (Japanese: 隠しダンジョン)	Subaru San	Michiru Tenma	Tomoki Kobayashi	July 27, 2024
5	"Attempting the 7th Floor! And a Date!?"; Transliteration: "Chōsen, Nana-Kaisō! Soshite Dēto!?" (Japanese: 挑戦、7階層！そしてデート！？)	Sumito Sasaki	Kazuyuki Fudeyasu, Yōhei Kashii	Tadayoshi Sasaki	August 3, 2024
6	"The Doubly Dangerous 8th Floor"; Transliteration: "Kiki Mata Kiki no Hachi-Kaisō" (Japanese: 危機また危機の8階層)	Kentarō Iino	Masanao Akahoshi	Kenya Ueno	August 10, 2024
7	"Open Campus of Adolescence"; Transliteration: "Seishun no Ōpun Kyanpasu" (Japanese: 青春のオープンキャンパス)	Hiroto Miyagi	Kazuyoki Fudeyasu	Tadayoshi Sasaki	August 17, 2024
8	"Bellia the Knight-Class Devil"; Transliteration: "Shishaku-kyū Akuma Beruria" (Japanese: 士爵級悪魔ベルリア)	San Subaru	Michiru Tenma	koto	August 24, 2024
9	"Joyful Days"; Transliteration: "Shiawasena Hibi" (Japanese: 幸せな日々)	Kenya Ueno	Michiru Tenma	San Subaru	August 31, 2024
10	"What I Can Do Now"; Transliteration: "Ima Jibun ni Dekiru Koto" (Japanese: いま自分にできること)	Kentarō Iino	Masanao Akahoshi	Tadayoshi Sasaki	September 7, 2024
11	"In Search of the Elixir"; Transliteration: "Erikusā o Sagashi te" (Japanese: エリクサーを探して)	Masamune Hirata	Kazuyuki Fudeyasu	Shin'ichi Watanabe	September 14, 2024
12	"And Their Heroic Tale Begins"; Transliteration: "Soshite, Eiyūtan ga Hajimaru" (Japanese: そして、英雄譚が始まる)	Tomonori Mine, Sumito Sasaki, Tomoki Kobayashi	Kazuyuki Fudeyasu	Tomoki Kobayashi, Shin'ichi Watanabe	September 21, 2024

== See also ==
- Love Is Indivisible by Twins, another light novel series with the same illustrator
