= Shoot! (manga) =

Japanese manga series

- First tankōbon volume cover, featuring Toshihiko Tanaka (right)

シュート! (Shūto)
- Genre: Sports
- Manga
- Written by: Tsukasa Ōshima
- Published by: Kodansha
- Magazine: Weekly Shōnen Magazine
- Original run: 1990 – 2003
- Volumes: 66
- Series titles
- 1. Shoot! (1990–1996, 33 volumes); 2. Shoot! Aoki Meguri Ai (1996–1997, 5 volumes); 3. Shoot! Atsuki Chōsen (1997–2000, 12 volumes); 4. Shoot! Arata Naru Densetsu (2000–2003, 16 volumes)
- Anime television series

Aoki Densetsu Shoot!
- Directed by: Daisuke Nishio
- Produced by: Shinji Shimizu; Yoshio Takami
- Written by: Junki Takegami
- Music by: Yusuke Honma
- Studio: Toei Animation
- Original network: FNS (Fuji TV)
- Original run: November 7, 1993 – December 25, 1994
- Episodes: 58
- Anime film
- Directed by: Daisuke Nishio
- Produced by: Shinji Shimizu; Yoshio Takami
- Written by: Junki Takegami
- Music by: Yusuke Honma
- Studio: Toei Animation
- Released: December 4, 1994
- Runtime: 25 minutes
- Anime television series

Shoot! Goal to the Future
- Directed by: Noriyuki Nakamura
- Written by: Mitsutaka Hirota
- Studio: EMT Squared; Magic Bus
- Licensed by: Crunchyroll
- Original network: AT-X, Tokyo MX, TV Shizuoka, ytv, BS NTV, BS Fuji
- Original run: July 2, 2022 – September 24. 2022
- Episodes: 13

Shoot! (Japanese: シュート!, Hepburn: Shūto) is a Japanese manga series written and illustrated by Tsukasa Ōshima. It was published in Kodansha's Weekly Shōnen Magazine between 1990 and 2003. The story revolves around a boy named Toshihiko Tanaka, who had just started at Kakegawa High School in order to play association football with his idol, Yoshiharu Kubo. Toshi's friends were not interested in playing football again until he convinces them to join the team and soon the team would enter the All-Japan High School Championship.

A 58-episode anime television series adaptation titled Aoki Densetsu Shoot! (蒼き伝説 シュート!, Aoki Densetsu Shūto!; lit. 'Blue Legend – Shoot!') was produced by Toei Animation and broadcast between November 7, 1993, and December 25, 1994, on Fuji Television. A brand-new original anime television series by EMT Squared and Magic Bus titled Shoot! Goal to the Future (シュート！Goal to the Future) aired from July 2 to September 24, 2022, on AT-X, Tokyo MX, TV Shizuoka, ytv, BS NTV, and BS Fuji. Noriyuki Nakamura directed the series alongside Junichi Kitamura serving as assistant director, Mitsutaka Hirota writing the scripts, and Yukiko Akiyama designing the characters. Crunchyroll streamed the series.

A side story volume centered around Yoshiharu Kubo was released in 1994.

Shoot! won the 1994 Kodansha Manga Award for the shōnen category.

== Story ==
Toshihiko "Toshi" Tanaka joined the same soccer club that his idol, Yoshiharu Kubo, plays for at Kakegawa High School. When Toshi played in junior high with two of his friends Kenji Shiraishi and Kazuhiro Hiramatsu, they were known as the Kakenishi golden trio. However, in high school, his friends do not want or cannot play soccer anymore. Hiramatsu is forced to study by his father so that he would become a respectable adult. However, Hiramatsu loves soccer and wants to play so he confronts his father and says that he wants to play soccer with his friends and that he would never understand his love for soccer. As it turns out, his father played soccer during his youth and, remembering how much he loved it, decides to let Hiramatsu play soccer but under the condition that he will keep his grades up as well. Shiraishi on the other hand quit soccer because he lost his temper and got into a fight that ended up disqualifying their team. He eventually joins the Kakegawa High School soccer club because he loves soccer and playing in the golden trio.

Tragedy struck Kake-High soccer club when they lost their captain and ace striker Yoshiharu Kubo. During the semifinal match against Kakekita, they were down 1–2 with less than ten minutes left. Kubo was on defense helping Kenji defend the goal against Hirose's Knuckle Shoot, when he decided to make an effort to tie the game. Kubo took the ball from his own side of the pitch, passed every Kakekita player, and scored the tying goal. Kubo collapsed and died after the game. Toshi scored the last and winning goal for Kake-High with the result 2–3.

The team could not get over Kubo's death and lost to Fujita East before they got to the Nationals. Soon after, Mahori, a Brazilian-Japanese student appears. He decides to join their team after making a bit of mayhem. The whole team decides to follow Kubo's example and play fun soccer, vowing to get to the Nationals in his name.

== Characters ==
=== Aoki Densetsu Shoot! ===
Toshihiko Tanaka (田仲俊彦, Tanaka Toshihiko)
Voiced by: Hikaru Midorikawa
The main character of Aoki Densetsu Shoot!. He is a freshman on the soccer team. When he joined the soccer club of Kakegawa High, he's only assigned to do the laundry by Co-Captain Kamiya. Later on during middle-school, the team recognized his ability and let him join the training.
At first, Toshi was not balanced in stepping. After examining his legs, Yoshiharu Kubo found out that Toshi's true strength lied in his left leg, not his right. This caused Kubo to put him in separated training apart from their teammates. Even though Toshihiko protested about this change, rigorous shooting training with his left leg made him discover that it had immense power, something that he had not felt before with his right. He has a crush on Kazumi, but they always end up arguing, and he can't seem to bring himself to tell her so directly.
Kazuhiro Hiramatsu (平松和広, Hiramatsu Kazuhiro)
Voiced by: Masami Kikuchi
One of Toshi's best friends since a young age. He stopped playing soccer to study more because of his father's will. But after a chat with Toshihiro, he gets talked into playing soccer again. Kazuhiro convinces his father, who also played soccer at a young age, to let him play soccer again. He was remarked as the genius player through the anime. He has a signature move: his "Heel Shoot" which causes confusion in his opponents by making it look like the ball disappears. Kazuhiro also has a crush on Kazumi, and is a love-rival of Toshi's.
Kenji Shiraishi (白石健二, Shiraishi Kenji)
Voiced by: Nobutoshi Canna
Kenji had also stopped playing soccer. Before the series, he had gotten his team disqualified from a tournament for starting a gang-fight. Much like Kazuhiro, he gets convinced to pick up soccer again and join the school team. His skills as a goalkeeper are praised throughout the series, primarily his great capability of sensing accurately the direction to where the ball is going. He is hot-tempered and picks fights easily. Kenji's signature move is his "Moon Salto Save." He found this move later in the series. With this move he defended the goal from Willy Reinhart's Wolf Shoot, making Kakegawa impenetrable.
Kazumi Endo (遠藤一美, Endō Kazumi)
Voiced by: Noriko Hidaka
The Manager of the soccer club. She's always there to cheer them up and stop the fan girls getting near 'her' team. She has always liked Toshi more than just as a childhood friend, but he "appears" to have no interest in her. Later on, she quits being soccer manager to start a career in the idol show business because she wants "to shine as bright as Toshi does".
Atsushi Kamiya (神谷篤司, Kamiya Atsushi)
Voiced by: Toshiyuki Morikawa
The Vice-Captain of the soccer team. He's always a bit rude, but he is still a kind-hearted person. He used to play selfishly back in middle school and his team didn't accept him, but as Kubo joined them, they became a strong formation together. After Kubo died, he became Captain and assigned Toshi the No. 10 uniform. It was also Kubo's will that Toshi succeeded him. Kamiya seems conceited sometimes, but he is nothing like this.
As captain he has the air of a leader. He thinks fast, creating strategies which can help the team and he is the one to motivate and help his teammates. He cares deeply for the team and has a great sense of responsibility. When Mahori appeared, the club separated into two factions: those who agreed with Mahori that the team had to change its style, like Kazuhiro, Nitta and Akahori, and those who insisted on following Kubo's play, like Tanaka, Kenji, Yuutaka and Shigeki (who was the leader of this team).
Kamiya arranged a practice match between the two teams with him as a referee. Through this match the second team found their past motive and way of playing. They tied the match in the last minute making an all-out attack; even Kenji let the post in order to score. After that everyone understood their mistake and decided to fight together till the end. Kamiya himself entered the match, seeing his teammates playing with their old style, unable to resist, taking everyone by surprise. Kamiya proved that he was thinking one step ahead of his teammates, especially after he took the place of the captain.
Kamiya makes an excellent playmaker. With his sharp pass, he can easily confuse the opponent. As his skills were improving, he became one of the best play makers of the nation. Moreover, later his abilities were recognized, and he was considered as good as Kubo, especially in the leading of his team.
Yoshiharu Kubo (久保嘉晴, Kubo Yoshiharu)
Voiced by: Toshio Furukawa
Genius Kubo was an extremely skillful and talented soccer player. His opponent saw him as the biggest rival and threat; his teammates followed the light and hope shone from his football. He lived in Germany for years before going back to Japan. Although he was invited by a lot of big football school, he chose to build his own team and went to Kakegawa. Kubo's talent was extraordinary that led the newly formed team to the quarterfinal in the national tournament. Also, Kubo did the coaching job of the team too, he made the tactic and worked on the training of the team. The player had affected many people with his talent. Facing Kakekita in the province semifinal, Kubo wrote a legend by getting through all 11 opponents and put the ball in the net. Yet he used too much energy and died due to leukemia. He died in episode 19. The members of the team carry on his will of "fun-soccer" during the rest of the series. Kubo had superior skills than other players, and he alone can execute one special shoot that later is done by combining Toshi and Kazuhiro together.
Keigo Mahori (馬堀圭吾, Mahori Keigo)
Voiced by: Tomokazu Seki
Keigo appeared for the first time on episode 21. He lived in Brazil for six years, and he got back to Japan just after Kubo died. Learning his skill from Brazil, the Samba technique excites the audience. He fills in Kubo's spot splendidly using his polished skills. Originally annoyed by his teammates because of his attitudes, it was him who pointed out that Kakegawas had to free themselves from Kubo's shadow.
Yutaka Sasaki (佐々木豊, Sasaki Yutaka)
Voiced by: Isshin Chiba
Sasaki wasn't considered a very good player. Sasaki his self entered the team to be with his best friend Nitta, as he was more into music and indeed a member of a band. However, through the anime Sasaki shows very good skills, he was chosen for the main squad from the beginning while Nitta entered a lot later. But knowing the secret practices Nitta has after school, he is willing to accompany his friends instead of guitar practice. His stamina and Speed, which are fast as Kazuhiro's are remarkable and he seemed to get too close with the team later. When Kubo died in a conversation, he mentioned that Kubo was the one who made him take the decision to enter too.
Shinichi Nitta (新田伸一, Nitta Shinichi)
Voiced by: Yūsuke Numata
He's a close friend of Sasaki. His role in story is minor. But surprisingly, he's often the savior in the heat of the game. His ability is creating offside-trap that often helped the team in dire situations when dangerous opponent strikers are attacking. His innocent face combined with great offside timing proves true alongside Kakegawa team. Although he's good at defending, he sometimes made mistakes by soloing the dribble pushing the opponents alone. This causes more advanced opponents to easily retake the ball from him and counterattack Kakegawa.
Shigeki Otsuka (大塚繁樹, Ōtsuka Shigeki)
Voiced by: Hisao Egawa
Otsuka is a big and strong player. His tackle and shooting are all about power. And he plays a very important role to the team. He is a good friend with Akahori and they went to the same junior high. He is a very impetuous and impulsive person. When the team was recruiting, he didn't want to join because he disliked the way Kamiya played. Kamiya then apologized and both Otsuka and Akahori joined the team at the end.
Tsuyoshi Akahori (赤堀強, Akahori Tsuyoshi)
Voiced by: Shinichiro Ohta
Akahori is very tall, standing 1.92 m. He is very tough in the defensive end. He took over the whole defensive responsibility on his own shoulders before Kenji came over as the goalie. Now, he is still the strongest and smartest defender in the team. Off the field, he is very kind and easy going. He can also play basketball well. In junior high, he used to play goalkeeper.

=== Shoot! Goal to the Future ===
Hideto Tsuji (辻秀人, Tsuji Hideto)
Voiced by: Chiaki Kobayashi (Japanese); Mike Haimoto (English)
Subaru Kurokawa (黒川昴流, Kurokawa Subaru)
Voiced by: Shun'ichi Toki (Japanese); Kevin D. Thelwell (English)
Jō Kazama (風馬成, Kazama Jō)
Voiced by: Yūki Ono (Japanese); Nazeeh Tarsha (English)
Kōhei Kokubo (小久保公平, Kokubo Kōhei)
Voiced by: Shimba Tsuchiya (Japanese); Ry McKeand (English)
Atsushi Kamiya (神谷篤司, Kamiya Atsushi)
Voiced by: Yūichirō Umehara (Japanese); Matthew David Rudd (English)
Yoshiharu Kubo (久保嘉晴, Kubo Yoshiharu)
Voiced by: Kohsuke Toriumi (Japanese); Ricco Fajardo (English)
Ryū Sahara (佐原龍, Sahara Ryū)
Voiced by: Tomoaki Maeno (Japanese); Cory Phillips (English)
Takumi Sonoda (園田拓海, Sonoda Takumi)
Voiced by: Junichi Saitō (Japanese); Mark Allen Jr. (English)
Tsubasa Namioka (並岡翼, Namioka Tsubasa)
Voiced by: Kentarō Mashiro (Japanese); Emi Lo (English)
Ryūji Amagai (雨谷隆二, Amagai Ryūji)
Voiced by: Ryōta Suzuki
Sōma Hayashi (林蒼真, Hayashi Sōma)
Voiced by: Ryūnosuke Matsumura
Hinata Tatsunami (立浪陽向, Tatsunami Hinata)
Voiced by: Daisuke Hirose
Kei Matsuhashi (松橋圭, Matsuhashi Kei)
Voiced by: Yugo Sato
Kazuki Yamaguchi (山口一希, Yamaguchi Kazuki)
Voiced by: Yuya Hozumi
Tōya Nakano (仲野桐也, Nakano Tōya)
Voiced by: Yūya Hirose

== Music ==
=== Aoki Densetsu Shoot! ===
Opening theme
"Keep Going until Reaching your Dream"～ (Yell ~Anata no Yume ga Kanau Made~)" by WENDY
Ending themes

1. "Sunao de Itai" by WENDY (1–46, 58)
2. "Watashi Datte" by Noriko Hidaka (47–57)

=== Shoot! Goal to the Future ===
Opening theme
"Aoreido" by Airi Miyakawa

Ending theme
"Rivals" by All at Once

== Video game ==
Two video games, both titled Aoki Densetsu Shoot!, were made for the Super Famicom and the Game Boy. The Super Famicom game was developed by Affect, published by KSS, and released on December 16, 1994, while the Game Boy game was published by Banpresto and released on April 7, 1995. Both games have exhibition modes, story modes, and a variety of options. Famicom Tsūshin scored the Game Boy game an 18 out of 40.
