= Rui Tsukiyo =

Japanese light novelist

- 月夜涙
- Born: Gunma Prefecture, Japan
- Writing career
- Period: 2014—
- Genre: Light novel
- Notable works: Redo of Healer; The World's Finest Assassin Gets Reincarnated in Another World as an Aristocrat
- Notable awards: Monster Bunko Awards, Grand Award (Elf Tensei kara no Cheat Kenkokuki) (2015)

Rui Tsukiyo (月夜涙, Tsukiyo Rui) is a Japanese novelist from Gunma Prefecture.

== Career ==
In 2014, Tsukiyo began releasing his first series Elf Tensei kara no Cheat Kenkokuki (エルフ転生からのチート建国記) to the web fiction site Shōsetsuka ni Narō. It would win the Monster Bunko Awards Grand Award in 2015 and later began publishing in July the same year under Futabasha's Monster Bunko label.

Redo of Healer also begun as a web novel in 2016 before officially releasing in 2017 under Kadokawa Shoten's Kadokawa Sneaker Bunko label. It was later adapted to a manga and then an anime.

The World's Finest Assassin Gets Reincarnated in Another World as an Aristocrat began as a web serial in 2018 and saw an official release in 2019. It too got adapted to a manga and an anime. Both the light novel and manga were acquired for English publication in 2020 under Yen Press.

== Writing style ==
His work is known for being dark and violent, containing themes such as rape, murder, and revenge. Tsukiyo states such stories emphasize the protagonist's actions and that he prefer protagonists who "don't hesitate."

In talking about Redo of Healer in particular, Tsukiyo says that it was influenced by revenge stories popular on Shōsetsuka ni Narō at the time and that the series was "born out of the desire to make an extended revenge story." He also says the series was a gamble, hoping the controversy generated would make it sell.

== Works ==
=== Novels ===
- Elf Tensei kara no Cheat Kenkokuki (エルフ転生からのチート建国記) (Illustrated by GUNP, published by Futabasha, 5 volumes, 2015–2016)
- Cheat Majutsu de Unmei wo Nejifuseru (チート魔術で運命をねじ伏せる) (Illustrated by Mitsuki Yono, published by Futabasha, 7 volumes, 2015–2018)
- Okashi Shokunin no Nariagari: Tensai Patissier no Ryōchi Keiei (お菓子職人の成り上がり〜天才パティシエの領地経営〜) (Illustrated by Kazutomo Miya, published by Futabasha, 5 volumes, 2016–2018)
- Maousama no Machizukuri: Saikyō no Dungeon wa Kindaitoshi (魔王様の街づくり!〜最強のダンジョンは近代都市〜) (Illustrated by Takahiro Tsurusaki (Vol. 1–3) Fūmi (Vol. 4 onward), published by SB Creative, 8 volumes, 2016—)
- Slime Tensei: Taikensha ga Yōjo Elf ni Dakishimeraretemasu (スライム転生。大賢者が養女エルフに抱きしめられてます) (Illustrated by Ichiri, published by Overlap, 3 volumes, 2017—)
- Redo of Healer (回復術士のやり直し 〜即死魔法とスキルコピーの超越ヒール〜, Kaifuku Jutsushi no Yarinaoshi: Sokushi Mahō to Sukiru Kopī no Chōetsu Hīru) (Illustrated by Shiokonbu, published by Kadokawa Shoten, 9 volumes, 2017—)
- Ore no Heyagoto Isekai he! Net to Amozon no Chikara de Musōsuru (俺の部屋ごと異世界へ! ネットとAmozonの力で無双する) (Illustrated by Minori Fuyuzora, published by Futabasha, 2 volumes, 2017—)
- Sono Ossan, Isekai de Nishūme Play wo Mankitsuchū (そのおっさん、異世界で二周目プレイを満喫中) (Illustrated by Tetsubuta, published by Futabasha, 6 volumes, 2018–2020)
- The World's Finest Assassin Gets Reincarnated in Another World as an Aristocrat (世界最高の暗殺者、異世界貴族に転生する, Sekai Saikō no Ansatsusha, Isekai Kizoku ni Tensei suru) (Illustrated by Reia, published by Kadokawa Shoten, 8 volumes, 2019—)
- Ijyōsaikyō Orc-san no Tanoshii Tanetsuke Haremzukuri (史上最強オークさんの楽しい種付けハーレムづくり) (Illustrated by Sakura Miwabe, published by Shogakukan, 4 volumes, 2019—)
- Tensei Ōji wa Renkinjutsushi tonari Kōkokusuru (転生王子は錬金術師となり興国する) (Illustrated by Arata Shindō, published by SB Creative, 2 volumes, 2019—)
- Isekai Yōgashiten Fox's Tail Lavender Kaoru, Amasa wo Wasuretagai Yuiitsu no Patisserie (異世界洋菓子店フォックステイル ラベンダー香る、甘さを忘れた街唯一のパティスリー) (Illustrated by Kippu, published by LINE, 1 volume, 2019—)
- Isekai Saikyō no Daimaō, Tenseishi Bōkensha ni Naru (異世界最強の大魔王、転生し冒険者になる) (Illustrated by Mitsumoto, published by Kadokawa Shoten, 2 volumes, 2020—)
- Eiyū Kyōshitsu no Chōetsu Majutsushi: Gendai Majutsu wo Kimeshisha, Tenseishi Tenshi wo Shitagaeru (英雄教室の超越魔術士 〜現代魔術を極めし者、転生し天使を従える〜) (Illustrated by Sayu Ayuma, published by Kadokawa Shoten, 2 volumes, 2020—)

=== Original manga ===
- Kujō Gakuen Seitokai wa Majiwaru (九条学園生徒会は交わる) (Illustrated by Yukiji, published by Shogakukan, 2 volumes, 2020—)
