= Actors: Songs Connection =

Japanese multimedia franchise

- Created by: Exit Tunes
- Anime television series
- Directed by: Osamu Yamasaki
- Written by: Osamu Yamasaki
- Music by: Hideakira Kimura; Tomotaka Ōsumi; Hiroaki Tsutsumi
- Studio: Drive
- Licensed by: Crunchyroll
- Original network: Tokyo MX, BS NTV, AT-X
- Original run: October 6, 2019 – December 22, 2019
- Episodes: 12

Actors: Songs Connection, stylized as ACTORS: Songs Connection, is a Japanese multimedia franchise created by Exit Tunes. It began as a series of drama CDs released in 2014, before having an anime television series for the franchise announced. The television series ran for twelve episodes from October to December 2019.

== Characters ==
Saku Otonomiya (音之宮 朔, Otonomiya Saku)
Voiced by: Gakuto Kajiwara (Japanese); Brandon McInnis (English)
Uta Outa (往田 詩, Outa Uta)
Voiced by: Yuya Hozumi (Japanese); Howard Wang (English)
Sōsuke Kagura (神樂蒼介, Kagura Sōsuke)
Voiced by: Wataru Urata (Japanese); Aaron Campbell (English)
Mike Enjōji (円城寺 三毛, Enjōji Mike)
Voiced by: Yūki Ono (Japanese); Daman Mills (English)
Mitsuki Akika (鑑香 水月, Akiha Mitsuki)
Voiced by: Kenji Nojima (Japanese); Reagan Murdock (English)
Satsuma Kadonoōji (葛野大路 颯馬, Kadonoōji Satsuma)
Voiced by: Ryōtarō Okiayu (Japanese); Josh Bangle (English)
Ryō Saotome (五月女 燎, Saotome Ryō)
Voiced by: Tomohiro Tsuboi (Japanese); Steven Kelly (English)
Keishi Harumoto (東本 桂士, Harumoto Keishi)
Voiced by: Noriaki Sugiyama (Japanese); Ricco Fajardo (English)
Kai Akizuki (秋月 甲斐, Akizuki Kai)
Voiced by: Takuya Eguchi (Japanese); Kyle Igneczi (English)
Chiguma Marume (丸目 千熊, Marume Chiguma)
Voiced by: Subaru Kimura (Japanese); Blake Jackson (English)
Kagetora Nagano (長野 影虎, Nagano Kagetora)
Voiced by: Ryō Horikawa (Japanese); Christopher Wehkamp (English)
Tsukasa Odawara (小田原 牧, Odawara Tsukasa)
Voiced by: Show Hayami (Japanese); J. Michael Tatum (English)
Washiho Usuki (臼杵 鷲帆, Usuki Washiho)
Voiced by: Ryōta Takeuchi (Japanese); David Wald (English)

== Production and release ==
The series began as a series of drama CDs released by Exit Tunes in March 2014. In November 2018, an anime television series adaptation was announced. The series was produced by Drive, with direction and script writing by Osamu Yamasaki, character designs by Asako Nishida, and music composed by Hideakira Kimura, Tomotaka Ōsumi, and Hiroaki Tsutsumi. While the first episode had an advanced screening at Anime Expo on July 7, 2019, the series officially aired on Tokyo MX and other channels from October 6 to December 22, 2019. The series ran for twelve episodes. The series' opening theme is "Titania", while its ending theme is "Inazuma Shock"; both were performed by the series' Japanese and English cast members.

The series is licensed outside of Asia by Funimation. An English dub, produced by Sound Cadence Studios, was released on Funimation's streaming service on November 24, 2019.

=== Episode list ===
No.	Title	Original release date
1	"Adagio"	October 6, 2019 (Note: This episode had an advanced screening on July 7, 2019.)
2	"con brio"	October 13, 2019
3	"dolente"	October 20, 2019
4	"abandone"	October 27, 2019
5	"traumend"	November 3, 2019
6	"appassionato"	November 10, 2019
7	"stravagante"	November 17, 2019
8	"concerto"	November 24, 2019
9	"agitato"	December 1, 2019
10	"piu mosso"	December 8, 2019
11	"decisivo"	December 15, 2019
12	"piacere"	December 22, 2019

== Reception ==
Rebecca Silverman, Theron Martin, and Nick Creamer from Anime News Network praised the character designs and music, while criticizing the story as basic and the characters as unemotional. Vrai Kaiser from Anime Feminist praised the music and animation, while also criticizing the characters as bland and unoriginal.
