= Tomoki Kobayashi =

Japanese anime director (born 1969)

Tomoki Kobayashi (小林 智樹, Kobayashi Tomoki; born December 26, 1969) is a Japanese anime director.

== Anime involved with ==
- A Nobody's Way Up to an Exploration Hero: Director
- Akame ga Kill!: Director, Storyboard (eps 1, 24), Episode Director (eps 1, 24)
- Amagami SS+ plus: Director, Storyboard (ep 3)
- Blade & Bastard: Director
- Futakoi Alternative: Episode Director (ep 4)
- Galaxy Angel A: Unit Director
  - Galaxy Angel Z: Storyboard, Unit Director
- Hundred: Director
- Infinite Dendrogram: Director
- Pretear: Storyboard (ep 11)
- Remake Our Life!: Director
- Rozen Maiden: Director (ep 5)
- Seiren: Director
- Sola: Director
- Seven of Seven: Episode Director, Dramatization
- Steins;Gate: Episode Director (9,15)
  - Steins;Gate: Egoistic Poriomania" Director
- Strawberry 100% (OVA): Director
- Summer Pockets: Director
- Takunomi: Director
- Tears to Tiara: Director
- The Daichis - Earth Defence Family: Episode Director (ep 5)
- Utawarerumono: Director, Storyboard (ep 1,15,18)
