= The World's Finest Assassin Gets Reincarnated in Another World as an Aristocrat =

Japanese light novel series and its adaptations

- First light novel volume cover, featuring (from left to right) Lugh Tuatha Dé, Dia Viekone, and Tarte

世界最高の暗殺者、異世界貴族に転生する (Sekai Saikō no Ansatsusha, Isekai Kizoku ni Tensei suru)
- Genre: Isekai
- Novel series
- Written by: Rui Tsukiyo
- Published by: Shōsetsuka ni Narō
- Original run: July 2018 – November 2018
- Light novel
- Written by: Rui Tsukiyo
- Illustrated by: Reia
- Published by: Kadokawa Shoten
- English publisher: NA: Yen Press
- Imprint: Kadokawa Sneaker Bunko
- Original run: February 1, 2019 – present
- Volumes: 8
- Manga
- Written by: Rui Tsukiyo
- Illustrated by: Hamao Sumeragi
- Published by: Kadokawa Shoten
- English publisher: NA: Yen Press
- Magazine: Young Ace Up
- Original run: October 4, 2019 – present
- Volumes: 9
- Anime television series
- Directed by: Masafumi Tamura
- Produced by: List: Yutaka Kashiwagi; Seiichi Kawashima; Nobuhiko Kurosu; Natsuki Miyagawa; Satoshi Motonaga; Akiko Ookubo; Youichi Sekine; Akihiro Sotokawa; Masakatsu Umeda
- Written by: Katsuhiko Takayama
- Music by: Kenichi Kuroda
- Studio: Silver Link (Note: Silver Link handled episodes 1, 3, 5, 7, 9, and 11, whereas Studio Palette handled episodes 2, 4, 6, 8, 10, 12, and both the opening and ending animations.); Studio Palette (S1)
- Licensed by: Crunchyroll (streaming); SA/SEA: Muse Communication
- Original network: AT-X, Tokyo MX, KBS, SUN, TVA, BS NTV
- English network: SEA: Animax Asia
- Original run: October 6, 2021 – present
- Episodes: 12
- icon

The World's Finest Assassin Gets Reincarnated in Another World as an Aristocrat (Note: Japanese: 世界最高の暗殺者、異世界貴族に転生する, Hepburn: Sekai Saikō no Ansatsusha, Isekai Kizoku ni Tensei suru), also known as The world's best assassin, To reincarnate in a different world aristocrat, (Note: This title is seen on the cover of the Japanese version of the light novel.) is a Japanese light novel series written by Rui Tsukiyo and illustrated by Reia. It was serialized online from July 2018 to October 2021 on the user-generated novel publishing website Shōsetsuka ni Narō. It was later acquired by Kadokawa Shoten, who have published the series since February 2019 under their Kadokawa Sneaker Bunko imprint.

A manga adaptation with art by Hamao Sumeragi has been serialized online via Kadokawa Shoten's Young Ace Up website since January 2019. Both the light novel and manga have been licensed in North America by Yen Press. An anime television series adaptation produced by Silver Link and Studio Palette aired from October to December 2021. A second season produced solely by Silver Link is set to premiere in January 2027.

== Premise ==
The protagonist is an old man who had lived his life as the world's greatest assassin. Due to his advanced age, it was finally decided that he would be able to retire. However, the plane he was on was sabotaged and even his skills as the greatest assassin could not save him. When he died, he was awakened by a goddess who wanted to reincarnate him in a world of swords and magic because she needs his skill set to prevent the destruction of that world at the hands of the Hero. Accepting this request, the protagonist awakens as Lugh Tuatha Dé and swears to finally live his life to its fullest using his skill to save the world.

== Characters ==
The cast of The World's Finest Assassin Gets Reincarnated in Another World as an Aristocrat (from left to right): Tarte, Lugh, Dia, and Maha.

Assassin (暗殺者, Ansatsusha)
Voiced by: Junpei Morita (Japanese); Mick Lauer (English)
The legendary assassin who was killed by his own organization and reincarnated as Lugh Tuatha Dé by the Goddess to fulfill a mission. Before his death, he was given the alias of "Allen Smith".
He plans to live his life as Lugh by his terms, and nobody else's.
Lugh Tuatha Dé (ルーグ・トウアハーデ, Rūgu Tōahāde)
Voiced by: Kenji Akabane, Makoto Koichi (young) (Japanese); Christian Banas (English)
The second child and son of Cian and Esri, who is actually the Assassin reincarnated by the Goddess. Lugh is the designated heir of the House of Tuatha Dé, taught in both the arts of medicine and assassination by his father. His older sibling is deceased. He is tasked by the Goddess with the job of killing the Hero after he defeats the Demon Lord as a prophecy revealed that the Hero, drunk on power, would destroy the world himself after defeating the Demon Lord.
Later in the story, Lugh ended up with three fiancées; Dia, Tarte, Maha.
Dia Viekone (ディア・ヴィコーネ, Dia Vikōne)
Voiced by: Reina Ueda (Japanese); Caitlin Glass (English)
Lugh's childhood friend, relative, as well as his lover. Dia first met Lugh as his teacher in the ability to use magic. She is one of the most powerful mages in her kingdom (Swoigel) and becomes even more powerful with the help of Lugh and his all-around knowledge of the modern world. When the Viekone region is affected by a civil war, Dia's father asks Lugh to safely take Dia into the Tuatha Dé region, where is adopted under the guise of being Lugh's younger sister.
Tarte (タルト, Taruto)
Voiced by: Yūki Takada (Japanese); Courtney Lin (English)
Lugh's assistant, who is trained as an assassin. Tarte is a mage saved by Lugh after she was abandoned by her poor family and almost killed by wolves, who wholeheartedly entrusts herself to her savior. On the surface, she appears as Lugh's beautiful attendant. She is highly skilled with the use of the spear. She also participates in the interrogation of prisoners. Although she is aware that Lugh only saved her life because of her high magical talent, Tarte decides to dedicate her entire life into being his most dedicated tool, to the point where she even develops feelings for him.
Maha (マーハ, Māha)
Voiced by: Shino Shimoji (Japanese); Hayden Bishop (English)
Lugh's adopted sister, who is also trained as an assassin. Maha is yet another mage saved from human trafficking by the machinations of Lugh, although at that time, he was known by his alias, Illig Balor. She serves as the CEO of Lugh's cosmetics brand while Lugh is absent. Her role on Lugh's assassination team is information gathering, logistical support, and interrogation of prisoners. Much like Tarte, she figures out that Lugh only saved her life because she was useful in his mission, but even so, she develops feelings for him.
Epona Rhiannon
Voiced by: Sumire Uesaka
Lugh's classmate and supposedly target, Epona is the hero who will destroy the world in the future according to the Goddess. She is considered a man in the family register, but genetically, she is really a woman. She was raised by a poor peasant family with high inferiority complex. Despite being chosen as the hero to defeat the Demon King, she is a pacifist at heart and does not like violence. She warms up to Lugh and his fellow assassination team. Ever since their first battle, Epona has developed feelings for Lugh.
Neusche Gephis (ノイシェ・ゲフィス, Noishe Gefisu)
Voiced by: Yūsuke Tonozaki
Lugh's best friend and classmate, Neusche entered the school as the top student in the S class. He is the eldest son of the fourth-generation ducal family, the Gefis family. He is quite ambitious and is trying to change the Kingdom of Alvan. He speaks highly of Lugh's abilities. He has also had a crush on Nevan Romarung since childhood, but he has never mentioned it to anyone.
Cian Tuatha Dé (キアン・トウアハーデ, Kian Tōahāde)
Voiced by: Toshiyuki Morikawa (Japanese); Kyle Hebert (English)
Lugh's father, as a Baron he is the current head of House Tuatha Dé. A loving father, he is proud of the fact that his son has absorbed so many of his teachings, especially on the occasion where his son broke his family creed to help his loved one, similar to how Cian himself had done the same to help his own significant other. Though he is unaware Lugh is only a "prodigy" assassin due to his past life.
Esri Tuatha Dé (エスリ・トウアハーデ, Esuri Tōahāde)
Voiced by: Chiaki Takahashi
Lugh's mother, a noblewoman of House Viekone, thus the reason for Lugh's silver hair, too. She was initially against raising Lugh as an assassin of House Tuatha Dé, but was convinced by her husband, who promised that he would protect Lugh with all of his power. Esri loves to tease her son and often gets into cooking contests with him after teaching him and eventually discovering he was especially skilled in the culinary arts. The anime shows her to put Lugh in dresses; which may be her way of expressing grief at the loss of her baby daughter.
Goddess (女神, Megami)
Voiced by: Yukari Tamura (Japanese); Veronica Taylor (English)
An entity from the afterlife who offers the Assassin the chance to be reborn in another world with his memories intact, but with the condition of killing that world's greatest hero when he reaches the age of 18. She is later revealed to answer to an entity more powerful than her and under that entity's orders, she was instructed to find a suitable teacher for the world's legendary hero, and when the time came, she would find someone to kill that hero.
When questioned by Lugh if killing the Hero was necessary, Goddess only stated that so long as Epona doesn't go rampaging, she isn't picky.
Ronah
A knight from a branch family. He at first did not like the idea of Lugh being the next head of House Tuatha Dé, but after Lugh defeats him, he comes to respect him.
Noine
A girl who came from the same prostitution ring as Maha. She scarred her own face with a sickle to try to stop being abused. After being rescued by Lugh, her scar is revealed to have been completely healed. She now works for Lugh's family.
Count Azba Venkaur
A corrupt aristocrat who sells military secrets in exchange for a harmful drug called vizein. He is killed by Lugh.
Setanta MacNess
A powerful warrior who was thought to be the hero. During his attack on Dia, he is slain by Lugh.

== Media ==
=== Light novels ===
The series released volumes on the Shōsetsuka ni Narō website from July 2018 to October 2021. Since February 2019, Kadokawa Shoten started releasing the series in print and has published eight volumes under their Kadokawa Sneaker Bunko imprint. In July 2020, Yen Press announced they licensed the series.

==== Volumes ====
No.	Original release date	Original ISBN	English release date	English ISBN
1	February 1, 2019	978-4-04-107941-6	December 29, 2020	978-1-9753-1241-1
2	July 1, 2019	978-4-04-107874-7	April 27, 2021	978-1-9753-1243-5
3	November 1, 2019	978-4-04-107877-8	October 12, 2021	978-1-9753-3335-5
4	April 1, 2020	978-4-04-108971-2	February 22, 2022	978-1-9753-3457-4
5	September 1, 2020	978-4-04-108972-9	June 21, 2022	978-1-9753-3465-9
6	February 27, 2021	978-4-04-108973-6	November 22, 2022	978-1-9753-4332-3
7	July 29, 2022	978-4-04-111501-5	July 18, 2023	978-1-9753-6722-0
8	August 1, 2024	978-4-04-111502-2	February 10, 2026	979-8-8554-1770-8

=== Manga ===
In January 2019, a manga adaptation by Hamao Sumeragi started serializing in Kadokawa Shoten's Young Ace Up manga website and has been collected in nine tankōbon volumes. Yen Press also licensed the manga for an English release.

==== Volumes ====
No.	Original release date	Original ISBN	English release date	English ISBN
1	October 4, 2019	978-4-04-108699-5	February 9, 2021	978-1-9753-1661-7
2	July 3, 2020	978-4-04-109105-0	March 22, 2022	978-1-9753-3510-6
3	April 9, 2021	978-4-04-111203-8	July 12, 2022	978-1-9753-3512-0
4	November 9, 2021	978-4-04-111808-5	February 21, 2023	978-1-9753-5077-2
5	September 9, 2022	978-4-04-112553-3	May 23, 2023	978-1-9753-6927-9
6	July 10, 2023	978-4-04-113419-1	August 20, 2024	978-1-9753-9882-8
7	March 8, 2024	978-4-04-114443-5	February 18, 2025	979-8-8554-1092-1
8	January 10, 2025	978-4-04-115356-7	February 24, 2026	979-8-8554-1244-4
9	February 10, 2026	978-4-04-116615-4	—	—
10	January 8, 2027	978-4-04-118051-8	—	—

=== Anime ===
An anime television series adaptation by Silver Link and Studio Palette was announced on February 15, 2021. Masafumi Tamura directed the series, with Katsuhiko Takayama writing and overseeing the scripts, Eri Nagata designing the characters, and Kenichi Kuroda composing the music. The series was originally scheduled to premiere in July 2021, but was delayed to October 2021 due to "various circumstances". It aired from October 6 to December 22, 2021, on AT-X and other channels. The opening theme is "Dark Seeks Light" performed by Yui Ninomiya, while the ending theme is "A Promise" performed by Aira Yūki. Crunchyroll streamed the series worldwide outside of Asia. On October 28, 2021, Crunchyroll announced the series would receive an English dub, which premiered on November 24, 2021. Muse Communication licensed the series in South and Southeast Asia.

A second season was announced during Kadokawa's "Sneaker Bunko 35th Anniversary Festa!" livestream on September 24, 2023. The cast and staff from the first season are reprising their roles, with Silver Link solely producing. It is set to premiere in January 2027.

==== Episodes ====
No.	Title (Note: All English titles are taken from Crunchyroll.)	Directed by	Written by	Storyboarded by	Original release date	Ref.
1	"Quantum of Trust"; Transliteration: "Shin'yō no Hōshū" (Japanese: 信用の報酬)	Masafumi Tamura	Katsuhiko Takayama	Gōichi Iwahata; Masafumi Tamura	October 6, 2021	
Lugh and his female companions accept a contract to assassinate the corrupt nobles assisting a slave auction, with two of the girls disguised as a slave and a maid. During this time, a flashback of his previous life shows he was training a rookie while simultaneously taking out members of a crime syndicate. As they tried to escape, the Assassin and the rookie were intercepted by a drone, which forced them to improvise in order to avoid it. As day broke, the Assassin contacted the organization where he announced his intent to retire and become a mentor to future assassins in Japan. Using fake passports, the Assassin and the rookie reached a nearby airport and took a flight to Japan. Unfortunately, their plane was attacked by a fighter jet deployed by the organization and the Assassin realized that he had been set up. Once the Assassin died, he encountered a Goddess who gave him a choice: be reborn as a completely different person or accept her request and be reborn with his memories intact. The Goddess wanted the Assassin to take the second choice because she needed him to kill the Hero of another world.
2	"Deal of Reincarnation"; Transliteration: "Tensei no Torihiki" (Japanese: 転生の取引)	Masafumi Tamura; Yoshifumi Sueda	Katsuhiko Takayama	Masafumi Tamura; Yoshifumi Sueda	October 13, 2021	
The Assassin agreed to kill the Hero simply because he wanted to experience the happiness he could not have in his previous life due to him suppressing his emotions. The Goddess allowed him to choose special powers and abilities, but warned him that he only had eighteen years after his birth to kill the Hero before the Hero brought chaos into the new world. She also told him that there was a slim possibility he could save the world without actually having to kill the Hero. He is then reborn as a child of the Tuatha Dé family, a noble house of assassins. As Lugh begins his new life, he becomes an expert hunter and cook and his physical growth is examined by his father, who concludes that Lugh is ready for a special surgery that will give him the ability to perceive magic in a person or an environment. Lugh successfully obtains the mystical eyes passed down the Tuatha Dé family and his father promises to teach Lugh how to perform the surgery when the time comes. He also finds a magic teacher for Lugh named Dia Viekone.
3	"Magic of Bonds"; Transliteration: "Kizuna no Mahō" (Japanese: 絆の魔法)	Yūsuke Sekine	Katsuhiko Takayama	Masafumi Tamura	October 20, 2021	
In attempt to measure Lugh's magical potential, Dia gives him a Fahr stone, a special gemstone that can measure a person's magic capacity. Lugh's power is so vast, however, that the Fahr stone ends up exploding. This gives Lugh the idea of using Fahr stones as makeshift grenades. Over the following weeks, Dia and Lugh become emotionally attached to each other. Lugh proves to be an exceptionally fast learner, not only learning how to synthesize metals, but also how to create weapons. He and Dia even learn how to create new spells together, and on their last night together, he gives her a titanium knife as thanks for being his teacher, while she gives him her personal Fahr stone. As Dia departs, Lugh's father decides that it is time for Lugh to assassinate someone for the first time while explaining the methods of the House of Tuatha Dé. His victim is a woman guilty of multiple crimes, who tries to plead innocence, but Lugh, knowing that the woman is lying, kills her painlessly.
4	"Plan of Goddess"; Transliteration: "Megami no Keikaku" (Japanese: 女神の計画)	Studio Palette; Motomasa Maeda	Katsuhiko Takayama	Studio Palette; Motomasa Maeda	October 27, 2021	
Using his mana vision, Lugh attempts to find someone who can be both his personal servant and his assistant during assassinations. Sure enough, Lugh finds such a person in the form of Tarte, a girl from a poor background, who had made her way to the Tuatha Dé region in hopes for a better life after being abandoned by her family. After rescuing her from a pack of wolves, Lugh brings Tarte to his home and gets permission from his father to train her as an assassin. When he reaches the age of 12, Lugh finds that Tarte has become skilled in spear fighting, but has trouble using smaller weapons like knives. To solve this problem, Lugh creates a special, retractable spear that Tarte can hide beneath her clothes. With a good weapon at her disposal, Lugh believes Tarte has become a valuable asset in his mission to kill the Hero.
5	"Qualifications of Assassins"; Transliteration: "Ansatsusha no Shikaku" (Japanese: 暗殺者の資格)	Masahiro Hosoda	Katsuhiko Takayama	Masahiro Hosoda	November 3, 2021	
Lugh has produced a large collection of Fahr stones thanks to the spells Dia taught him and reports to his father, revealing that all this time, he has been observing Tarte and can say with full confidence that she is not a spy from a rival region. Lugh's father tells him that it is time for Lugh to face him in combat in order to prove he is ready to perform assassinations. Despite Lugh's youth and experience from his previous life, Cian proves to be a formidable opponent. Afterwards, Lugh joins Cian in performing assassinations and Cian tells him that in order to facilitate his work, Lugh will have to assume a fake identity as a member of the Balor trading family. Cian holds a party to celebrate Lugh's ascension as heir to the House of Tuatha Dé. Ronah, a member from a branch family, disagrees with the decision and challenges Lugh to a duel, but he is easily defeated. Even so, Lugh gifts him with a special sword so that Ronah can continue his training as a knight. The next morning, Lugh and Tarte depart and begin their journey to the Balor region.
6	"Residence of Girls"; Transliteration: "Shōjo no Yakata" (Japanese: 少女の館)	Masafumi Tamura	Katsuhiko Takayama	Masafumi Tamura	November 10, 2021	
As Lugh and Tarte begin their lives in the Balor region, Maha and her friends work hard to make a living in the merchant town Milteu. Unfortunately, they are captured by a group of bandits and taken to an orphanage, which turns out to be a front for a prostitution ring. There, all the girls, except Maha, are forced into prostitution under the heel of the local noble, which deeply traumatizes them and even causes one of them, Noine, to scar her own face with a sickle if it means not having to work as a prostitute. Two years pass, and Maha, upon knowing that she is next in line and was about to do the same thing as Noine, is eventually found by Lugh, under the alias of Illig Balor. However, before Lugh can buy her, the director of the orphanage tells him he must wait three days, but Lugh suspects that he might double-cross him. Fortunately, Lugh saves Maha and with Tarte's help, he is able to expose the noble's crimes and get him arrested. As the prostitution ring is shut down, Noine finds that her scars have been healed and Maha finds a new home with Lugh.
7	"Life of Falsehoods"; Transliteration: "Itsuwari no Seikatsu" (Japanese: 偽りの生活)	Mamoru Enomoto	Katsuhiko Takayama	Masayoshi Nishida; Masafumi Tamura	November 17, 2021	
As Lugh continues his life as Illig Balor, he comes up with the idea of opening a cosmetics shop in Milteu in order to both increase profits for the Balor family and fund his assassination duties. He also introduces lotions, moisturizers and sweets to the new world, giving his shop, Orna, a massive boost in sales and a huge advantage in the market in only six months after its opening. However, spies hired by rival businesses attempt to infiltrate Lugh's home to discover the secrets of his success. With the help of Tarte and Maha, Lugh captures at least one spy, but is unable to gain any useful information from him, even when subjecting him to torture. As his business grows, Lugh temporarily leaves Milteu and visits Dia in order to increase his magical knowledge. To his own surprise, he discovers he ejaculated while Maha and Tarte slept alongside him, implying that Lugh is starting to see his partners as more than just pawns.
8	"Rites of Choice"; Transliteration: "Sentaku no Gishiki" (Japanese: 選択の儀式)	Yoshifumi Sueda	Katsuhiko Takayama	Yoshifumi Sueda	November 24, 2021	
Having established a prosperous business in Milteu, Lugh decides to return home and continue his training as an assassin. He leaves Maha in charge of Orna, knowing that she plans to expand the business into other regions, and promises he will come to visit. On their way home, Lugh and Tarte are attacked by a pack of wolves, but Tarte easily kills them and Lugh observes that monster attacks on human settlements have become more frequent, suspecting that the Hero will show up soon. Upon his return, Lugh is summoned to his father's study, where Cian gives him the choice to give up on the life of an assassin and instead live peacefully as a merchant. Cian has become too old to do something else with his life, but Lugh is still free to choose his own path; however, Lugh chooses to remain in his current lifestyle, admitting that he has fallen in love with Dia and he will not be able to marry her if he does not possess the privileges of the Alvan Kingdom's aristocracy. Accepting his son's choice, Cian gives Lugh his first target as a fully trained assassin.
9	"Compensation of Assassination"; Transliteration: "Ansatsu no Daishō" (Japanese: 暗殺の代償)	Yūsuke Sekine	Katsuhiko Takayama	Gōichi Iwahata; Masafumi Tamura	December 1, 2021	
Lugh's first target as a fully trained assassin is Count Azba Venkaur, an aristocrat who has been selling military secrets to neighboring kingdoms in exchange for vizein, a drug that he distributes throughout the kingdom. Using Maha's information network, Lugh decides to investigate the count by himself and determine whether or not the target truly deserves assassination. Lugh and Tarte visit Pisear, the second-largest merchant town in the kingdom, and take down a criminal group selling vizein, but not before seeing the effects of the drug on a poor girl's mother. Sometime later, Lugh and Maha travel to the count's mansion under the pretense of selling Orna's products, which proves to be a success for Orna. As night falls, Lugh silenty assassinates Count Venkaur with his newest weapon, a sniper rifle, but takes the time to watch the grieving wife's reaction. While Lugh does not regret taking the count's life, he promises never to forget this particular mission, as it was the first assassination he performed as a free man rather than as an unfeeling tool.
10	"First of Dates"; Transliteration: "Hajimete no Dēto" (Japanese: 初めてのデート)	Motomasa Maeda; Masafumi Tamura	Katsuhiko Takayama	Motomasa Maeda	December 8, 2021	
Lugh and Tarte spend a full month on a deserted island as part of their assassin training and upon returning to the mainland, Maha gives them information about a divine treasure, a tool of immeasurable power, that Lugh has been trying to purchase for some time. This divine treasure, a magical spear called Gae Bolg, is in possession of Setanta MacNess, a renowned warrior suspected to become the legendary Hero. Lugh also discovers that the Viekone region is involved in a war and rushes to Dia's house, offering her a way to escape should the war reach her doorstep. Dia refuses to abandon her home, stating her obligations to her family and her people. Even so, Lugh and Dia decide to enjoy themselves on a date. As Lugh returns home, he still thinks he can help Dia escape from the war; but Dia has already taken steps to defend herself by fortifying her hometown. Sometime later, a wounded soldier asks the Tuatha Dé family to assassinate Dia.
11	"Choice of Betrayal"; Transliteration: "Uragiri no Ketsui" (Japanese: 裏切りの決意)	Masahiro Hosoda	Katsuhiko Takayama	Gōichi Iwahata; Masafumi Tamura	December 15, 2021	
Cian explains that it was Dia's father who ordered the assassination on his own daughter as an attempt to stop the civil war currently afflicting the Viekone region. Since the Tuatha Dé family has always had the option to reject missions depending on their interests, Lugh realizes that Dia's death will ultimately fail to stop the war and deduces he can use this mission to save Dia. Tarte, acknowledging Lugh's feelings for Dia, helps him reach the Viekone region in a way that helps him conserve his magical energy and Lugh finds that the Viekone mansion is under siege, but is able to make his way to Dia while keeping casualties to a minimum. Meanwhile, Maha's information network has gathered information on the divine treasure Lugh has been looking for and Maha decides to relay her findings to Lugh immediately.
12	"Battle of Assassin"; Transliteration: "Ansatsusha no Tatakai" (Japanese: 暗殺者の戦い)	Yoshifumi Sueda; Masafumi Tamura	Katsuhiko Takayama	Yoshifumi Sueda; Masafumi Tamura	December 22, 2021	
Lugh and Dia's father come up with a plan to fake Dia's death and safely sneak her to the Tuatha Dé region. Unfortunately, the arrival of Setanta MacNess thwarts the plan before they can enact it. As Setanta is the wielder of Gae Bolg, Lugh knows that he will not survive a direct confrontation with him, so he fires a magnetically propelled tungsten projectile into the atmosphere and stalls Setanta long enough for it to obliterate him. Afterwards, the Tuatha Dé family adopts Dia under the guise of being Lugh's younger sister, even though she is technically older than Lugh, completing the mission. Sometime later, Lugh receives word that the Hero, Lord Epona Rhiannon, has arrived in the Alvan Kingdom.
