= Housing in Hong Kong =

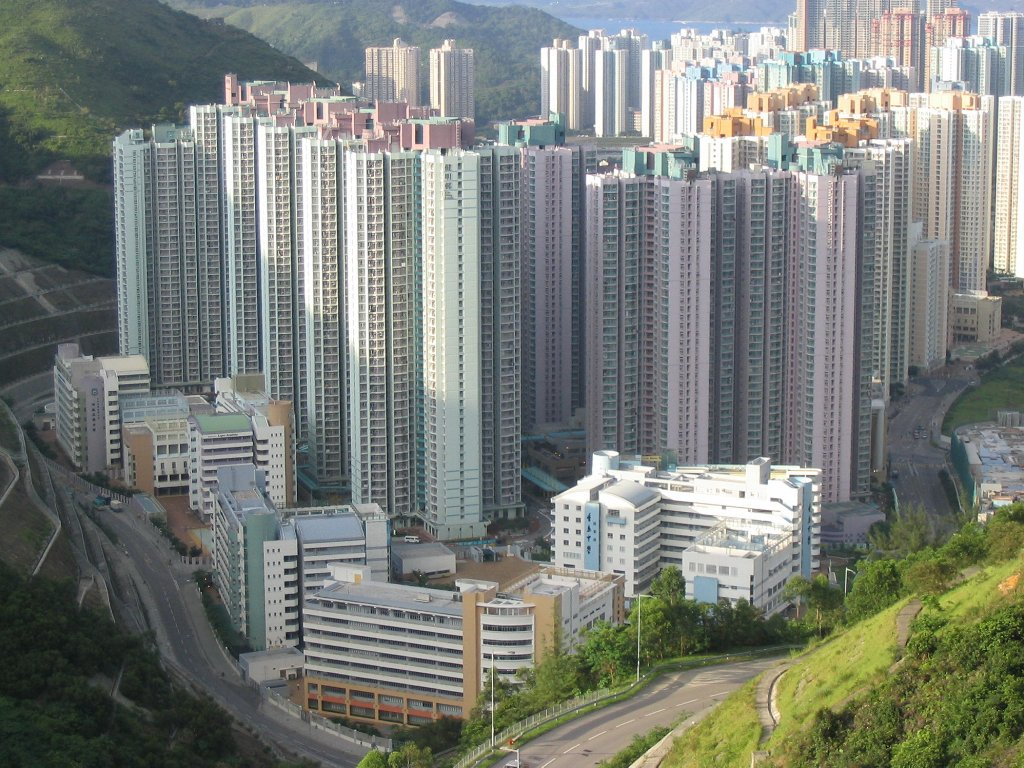
29.1% of the Hong Kong population lives in public rental housing estates. Kin Ming Estate, completed in 2003, is a public housing estate located in Tseung Kwan O. It consists of 10 housing blocks and houses a total of about 22,000 people.

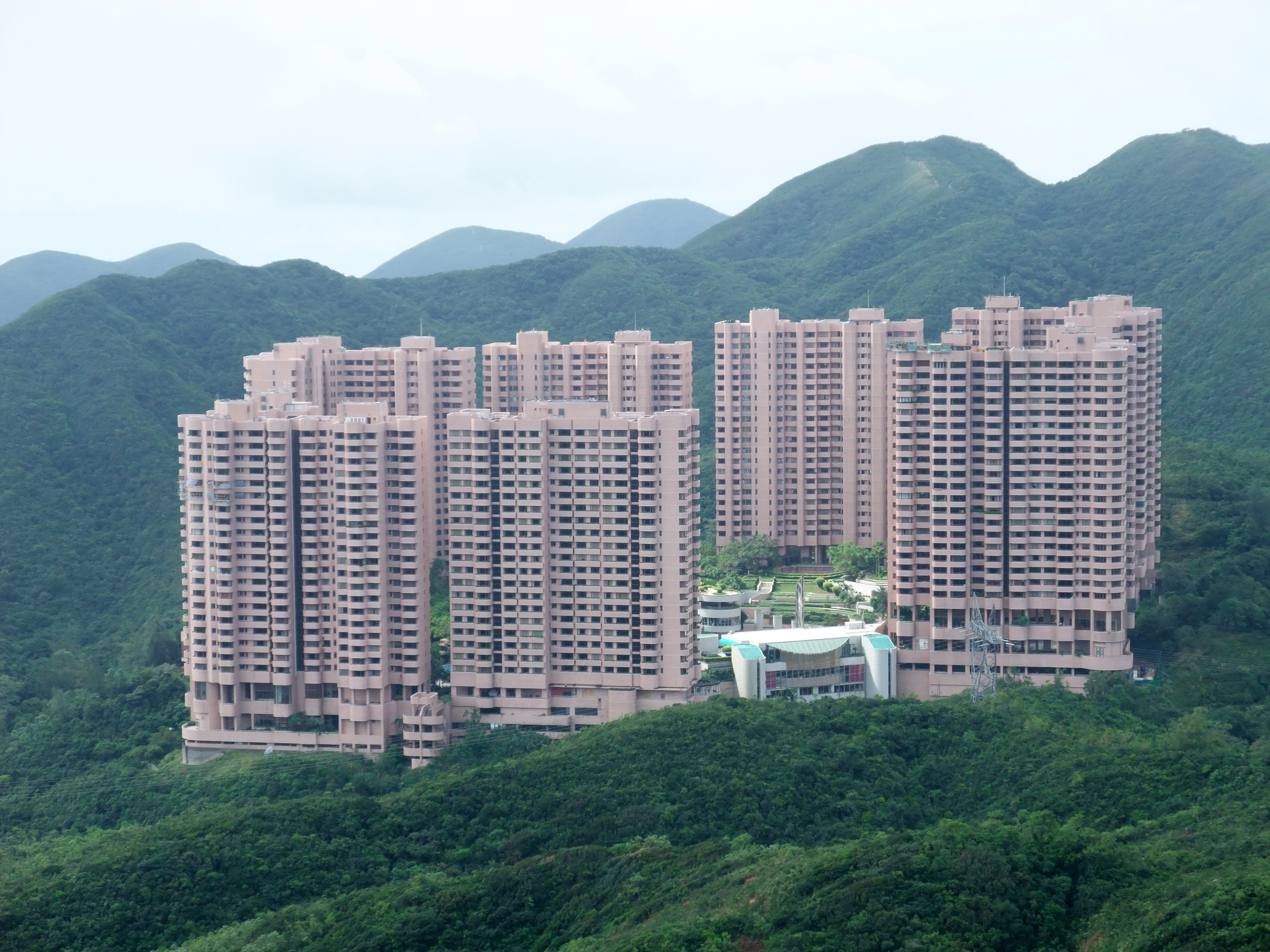
Private housing estates are a common form of private permanent housing. Hong Kong Parkview, located at Wong Nai Chung Gap is among the ones at the top of the market.

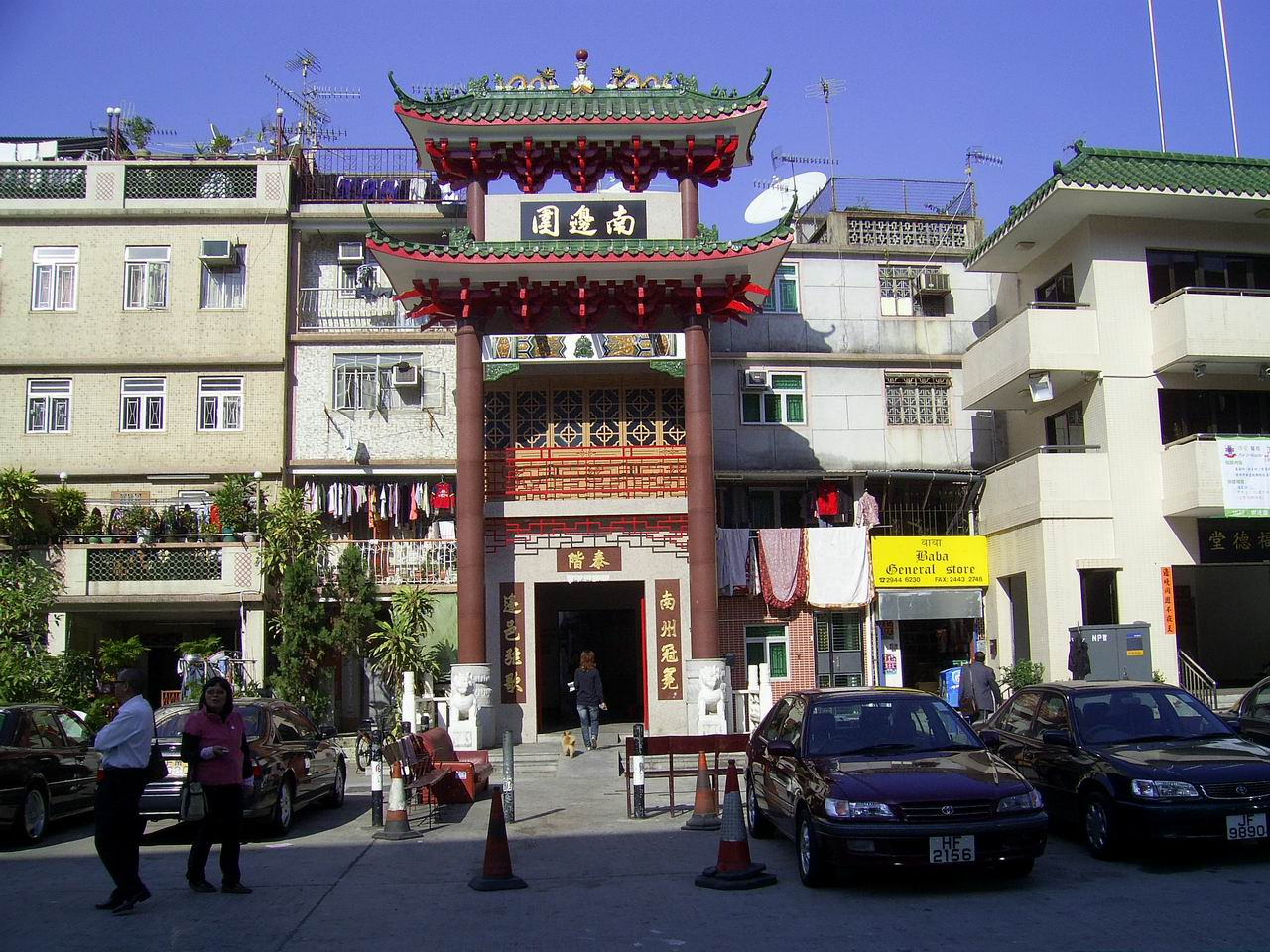
Traditional housing can be found in the New Territories. Some villages have been occupied for over 200 years. Here, the entrance gate of Nam Pin Wai, a walled village in Yuen Long Kau Hui.

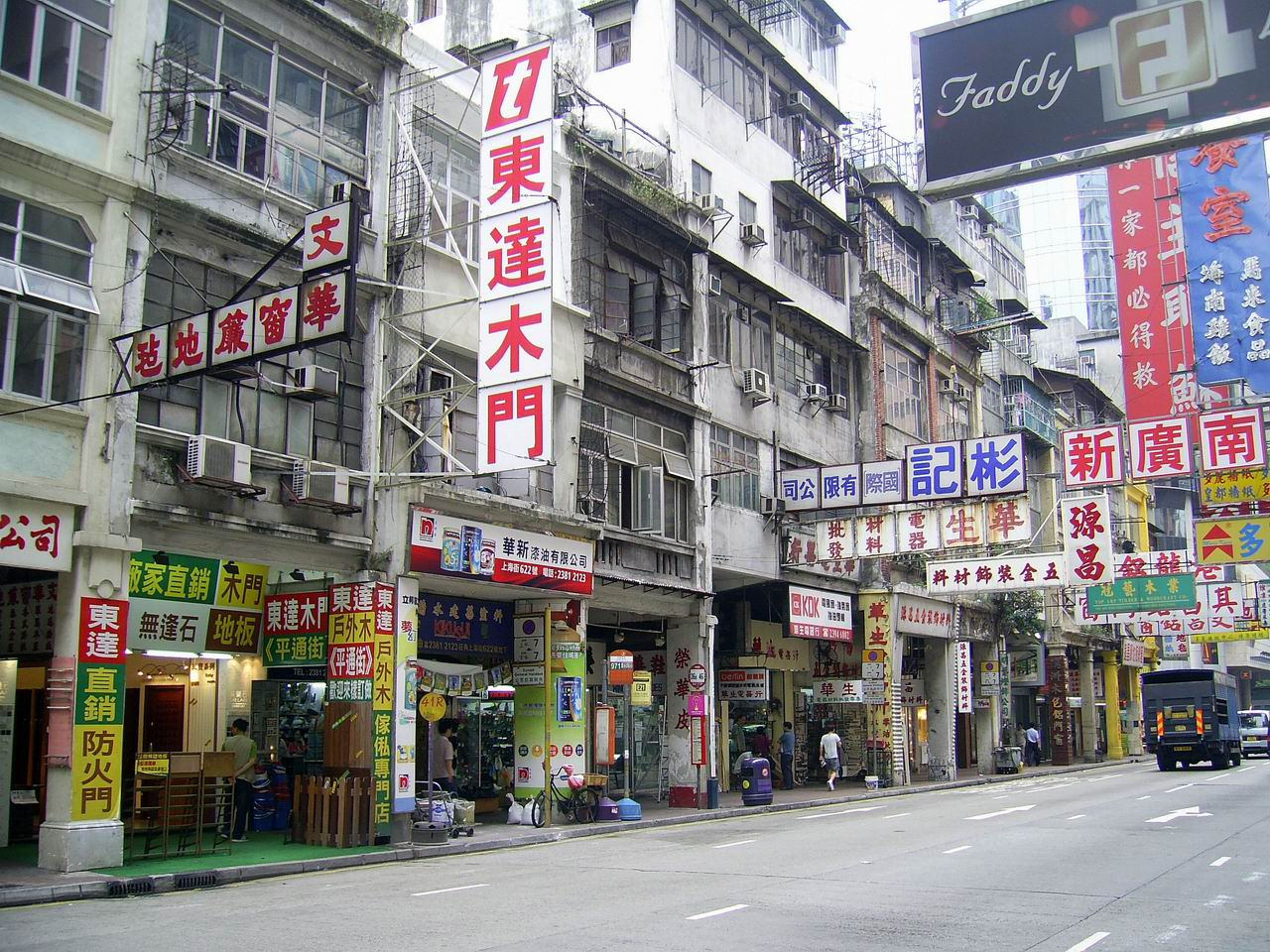
Urban settlements on Hong Kong Island, Kowloon and some former market towns in the New Territories were mostly developed during the 19th and 20th centuries. Tong-laus, the local form of shophouses, built mostly in the first half of the 20th century, are witnesses of this development.

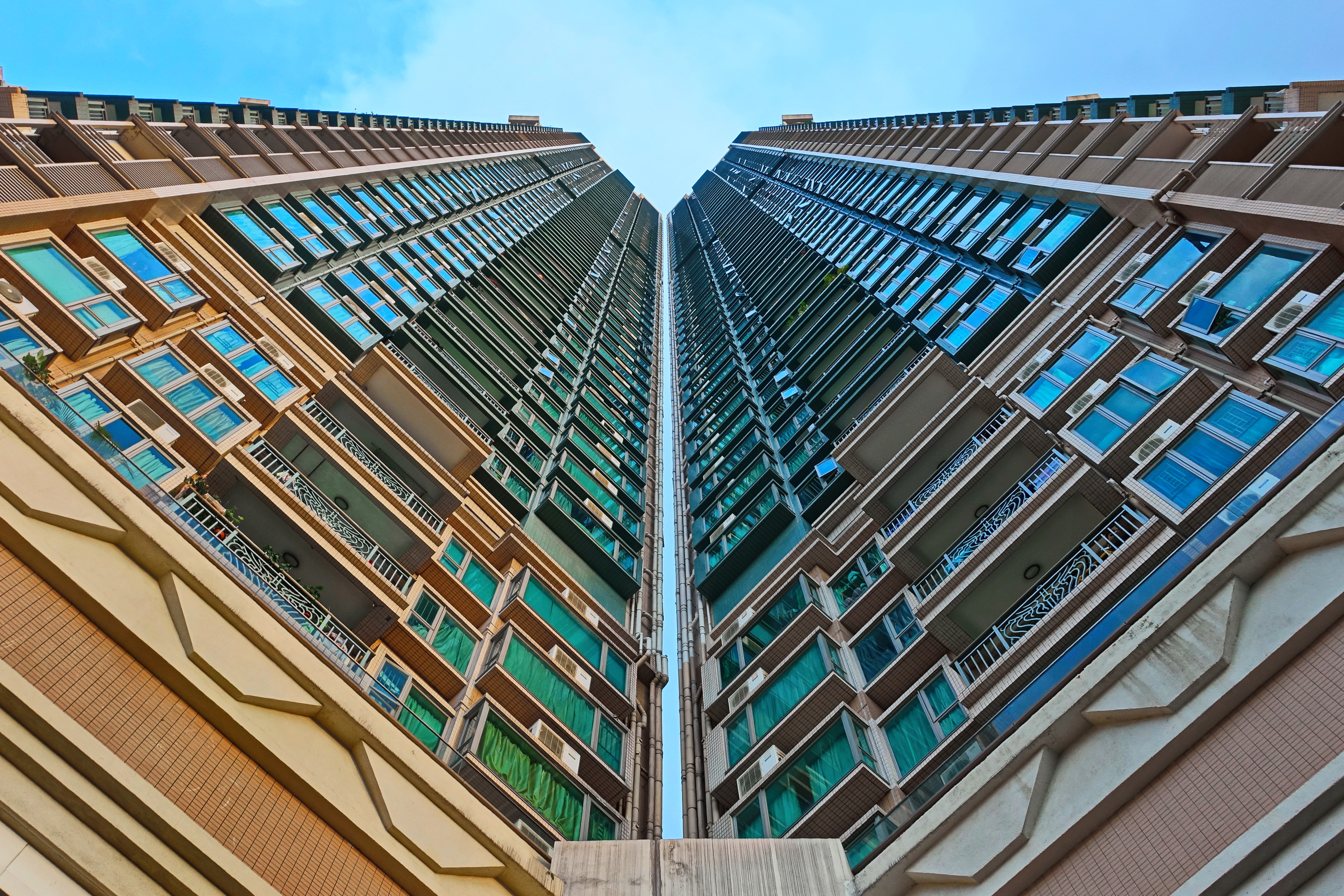
Caribbean Coast, a 56-story residential skyscraper, in Tung Chung New Town.

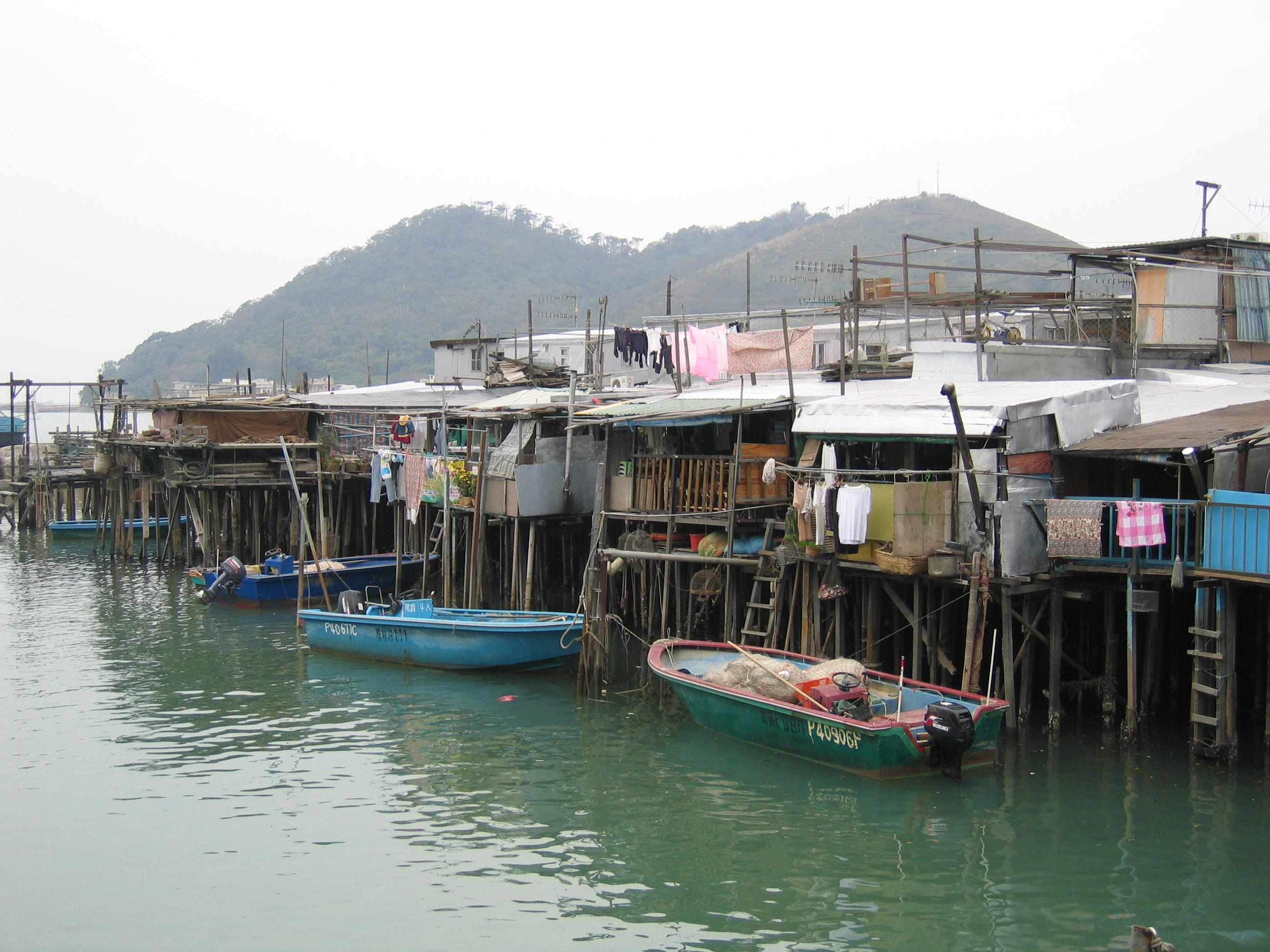
Pang uk are stilt houses found in Tai O.

Housing in Hong Kong varies by location and income. More than 7 million people live on about 1,108 km^{2} (427 mi^{2}) of land in the region, making it one of the densest places in the world.

== Housing by types ==
In 2016 the total Hong Kong population was 7.3 million. According to the 2016 by-census, the population breakdown by type of housing was as follows:

Breakdown of housing by population percentage, 2016
Type	Category	Includes	%
Permanent	Public Rental Housing	Public Rental Housing units (Hong Kong Housing Authority and Hong Kong Housing Society units), Interim Housing units	29.1%
Permanent	Subsidized Home Ownership Housing	Tenants Purchase Scheme units with alienation restrictions, Home Ownership Scheme and other subsidised units with alienation restrictions (Housing Authority or Housing Society units)	15.8%
Permanent	Private Permanent Housing	Private residential flats: Former subsidised sale flats, Ordinary private residential flats, Other quarters in private permanent housing: Villas, bungalows and modern village houses, Simple stone houses/Traditional village houses, Staff quarters	53.2%
Permanent	Non-domestic Housing	Quarters in non-residential buildings, Collective living quarters	1.2%
Temporary	Temporary Housing	Temporary quarters	0.7%

=== Segmentation ===
In the high-end market, the Peak is ranked the 3rd most expensive city in the world in 2007 with a square foot per unit pricing of US $2,008 behind London and Monaco.

=== Types ===
==== Housing estates ====
- Public housing estate
- Private housing estate

==== Traditional and historical housing ====
- Tong Lau
- Pang uk
- Walled villages of Hong Kong
- Kowloon Walled City

==== Sub-standard housing ====
- Subdivided flat
- Cage home

== Policies ==
=== Land use ===
According to the government's 2020 survey, of the 1,114 km^{2} (111,400 hectares) of land in Hong Kong, a total of 79 km^{2} (7,900 hectares) is allocated for residential purposes. Of that 79 km^{2}, the breakdown is as follows:

Private residential (excludes village housing): 27 km^{2} (2,700 hectares), 34.2%
Public residential (includes subsidized housing and temporary housing area): 17 km^{2} (1,700 hectares), 21.5%
Village housing: 35 km^{2} (3,500 hectares), 44.3%

Though village housing occupies 44.3% of all residential land, only 7% of the population lives in it, with the other 93% of the population living in the other 55.7% of residential land. This means that non-village housing has, on average, about 10.6 times the population than village housing, for the same amount of land area.

==== Lease modification ====
Land owners in Hong Kong who wish to change the use of land they held, must pay a land premium charge to the government for changing the use of the land they leased from the government. The premium needed to be paid is supposed to represent the higher value in the land's new usage.

=== Public housing ===
Public housing is a major component of the housing in Hong Kong. About half of Hong Kong residents now live in public housing estates (Chinese: 公共屋邨) and other tower blocks with some form of subsidy. The history of public housing in Hong Kong can be traced back to the 1950s, where masses of people surged into Hong Kong due to political turmoil on the mainland. This led to a drastic increase in the number of squatters. Fires were common in these unhygienic and cramped makeshift homes. In 1953, a fire in Shek Kip Mei destroyed the shanty homes of approximately 53,000 people. In response the Hong Kong Government commenced a programme of mass public housing, providing affordable homes for low income citizens.

Several subsidized home ownership programs have been implemented, including: Home Ownership Scheme, Flat-for-Sale Scheme, Tenants Purchase Scheme, Sandwich Class Housing Scheme and Private Sector Participation Scheme.

=== Supply target ===
The government sets a Long Term Housing Strategy every year, which plans housing units for the next 10 years. In 2014, the government's target for public and subsidized flats vs private housing units was set at 60% and 40%. In 2018, the target was changed to 70% public and 30% private. Under that ratio, the government projected 450,000 total flats to be developed in the 10 years after 2018, with 315,000 to be public, and 135,000 to be private.

SCMP noted that these were only targets, and that "Since 2014, the government has never hit its target of building enough public flats. The public housing units provided in the past four years only accounted for 47 per cent of the actual number of homes built, falling short of the 60 per cent target." Additionally, a member of the Democratic Party stated that without increasing land supply, the government would continue to fall short of its target.

In December 2020, Secretary for Transport and Housing Frank Chan announced that the next target would be 430,000 total units over the next 10 years, down from the 450,000 target specified in 2018. This means an annual target of 43,000 total units, with the same 70% public (30,100) and 30% private (12,900) target ratio. In December 2021, the target set in December 2020 was reconfirmed for the next 10 years.

In July 2021, Adam Kwok Kai-fai, an executive of Sun Hung Kai Properties, suggested that the 10 year targets did not have accountability, and that officials should set up a committee to oversee progress towards meeting the 10 year targets, with a government official held accountable if the targets were not met.

==== Expected shortage ====
The Hong Kong government in 2016 estimated that over the next 30 years, Hong Kong will face a shortage of approximately 1,200 hectares for housing.

In 2021, the shortage was revised upwards to 3,000 hectares over the next 30 years.

== Affordability ==
Hong Kong's home prices top the list of least affordable markets among major world cities according to American research institution Demographia's latest report in January 2015. The Demographia International Housing Affordability Survey 2015 includes 378 property markets around the globe, generating Median Multiples according to the proportion of average property price to median household income. Results are categorized into 4 levels: Affordable (Below 3 times), Moderately Unaffordable (3.1 to 4 times), Seriously Unaffordable (4.1 to 5 times) and Severely Unaffordable (5.1 times and over). Hong Kong falls into the grading of 'Severely Unaffordable', with the highest recorded index of 17.0 since the report commenced 11 years ago. Second on the list was Vancouver with an index of 10.6, still significantly lower than HK.

A CBRE report from 2019 lists Hong Kong as having the highest average property price in the world. As of June 2021, an average 500 sqft apartment cost HK$9.44 million in Hong Kong Island, HK$8.32 million in Kowloon, and HK$7 million in New Territories; an average family would have to save for about 20.7 years to pay for such a unit.

According to the 2014/2015 Household Expenditure Survey, housing accounted for an average of 36% of average monthly household expenditure, with utilities accounting for an additional 3%.

The home ownership rate peaked at 54.3% in 2004. The median floor area of households as of 2016 is 430 sqft, while the floor area per capita is 160 sqft.

A local think tank, New Youth Forum, said in October 2023 that buying power for youth had been halved over the past 20 years, due to increases in housing prices. The think tank also opposed recent calls to eliminate anti-speculation taxes.

Monetary Authority chief executive Joseph Yam Chi-kwong warned that the city's policy on land and high property values would prevent economic growth.

== Proposed causes of high housing cost ==
There are many contributing factors to Hong Kong's extremely high cost of housing. Though Hong Kong's economy is historically based on positive non-interventionism, the government intervenes heavily in housing, disrupting free-market economics. The high costs of housing have caused some to live in very small subdivided flats, sometimes referred to as "coffin homes", with an estimated 110,000 subdivided units in Hong Kong, housing 220,000 people. Those living in poor conditions (subdivided flats, rooftop huts, industrial or commercial buildings, cubicles, and bed spaces) are estimated to house 127,000 households over the next 10 years.

Several reasons for the high costs and lack of free-market economics of the housing market have been outlined by the media, and are explained below:

=== Opaque pricing ===
When new units are sold by tender, the current highest bid is not revealed to the buyers, a method which has been criticized as being unfair to buyers and also tends to increase prices.

A reader's letter to SCMP also stated that prices are also not clear, as developers offer a commission to property agents on sales, a portion of which is passed back to the buyer in the form of a rebate, which may artificially inflate prices as well.

=== Supply constraint ===
==== Small House Policy ====
The Small House Policy, introduced in 1972, guarantees every male indigenous villager a grant to build his own house. It has been described as an unsustainable policy due to shortage of land; as noted by a professor at Chinese University, "The problem that has to be faced is that of sustainability. Sooner or later, there will not be enough land to satisfy a potentially endless pool of claimants." In addition, the former Secretary for Housing, Planning and Lands, Michael Suen Ming-yeung, has also said that the policy is unsustainable, and that "They will keep producing new generations; the policy cannot be allowed to continue. People have to agree on a date that the small house right should end, in ten or 20 years - to allow enough time for preparation so that the benefits of current right holders are not hurt." Though Carrie Lam has called for an end to the policy, the Heung Yee Kuk, which represents villagers, has spent resources to challenge changes to the policy. According to a SCMP report, 5,000 hectares, representing about 20% of all urban space in Hong Kong, is locked up for these low-rise developments, rather than being used for high-rise developments which would increase the supply of housing.

Also, according to the Heung Yee Kuk, there are approximately 2,400 hectares of tso/tong land, land which is held in the name of villager clans and families, many of which are underutilized. In May 2021, SCMP noted how difficult it is for tso/tong land to be sold by villagers and bought by developers, as it requires unanimous consent of a villager clan/family, rather than a majority. In Carrie Lam's 2021 Policy Address, the government pledged to set up a working group to address the difficulties of getting unanimous consent for the land, as well as vacancies of managers for the land.

In May 2021, Liber Research Community released another report titled Research Report on Development Potential of Vacant Small House Land, which determined that of a total of 3,380 hectares of village-type land, 1,548.8 hectares were idle and privately owned, with a separate 932.9 hectares of idle land belonging to the government, totaling 2,481.7 hectares. Additionally, it found potential collusion between developers and villagers on 149.1 hectares of idle privately owned villager land.

Liber Research Community also found approximately 10,500 village houses built illegally, via a method known as tou ding.

In February 2024, an opinion article from SCMP said that villagers had built illegal gardens, charged others money for parking cars on government land, and built numerous other illegal structures.

==== Chinese military land usage ====
The Hong Kong Garrison of the People's Liberation Army, the military force of China, occupies 2,750 hectares of land across Hong Kong, land that has been reported to be underutilized and could be used for housing instead. In particular, the Castle Peak / Tsing Shan firing range occupies 2,263 hectares, or around 80% of all PLA land area.

==== Brownfield sites ====
Predominantly in the New Territories, the Legislative Council found that active brownfield sites occupy 1,414 hectares of land, with inactive brownfield sites occupying an additional 165 hectares. A government-appointed task force surveyed the public and found that developing brownfield sites was one of the most favored options for developing new housing. The Liber Research Community estimated that almost 90% of businesses that use brownfield sites could be easily relocated to multi-story buildings, freeing up land for housing.

In June 2021, Liber Research Community and Greenpeace East Asia collaborated and found a new total of 1,950 hectares of brownfield sites, 379 more hectares than the government was previously able to locate. In September 2021, Greenpeace East Asia found several brownfield sites that illegally stored hazardous materials.

In October 2022, the government said it had identified 1,600 hectares of brownfield sites, still lower than the 1,950 found earlier.

In July 2024, Liber Research Community found that some people had applied to use brownfield sites for animal shelters, but had used concrete over the land to form other industrial sites instead.

==== Rural Land Hoarding ====
Large developers own large amounts of rural land in Hong Kong, land which could be used for housing. Developers have been estimated to hold at least 1,000 hectares of agricultural land just in the New Territories, equivalent to at least 107 million square feet. In 2019, the government announced that it would seize a total of 7.3 million square feet of land (67.8 hectares), including 1 million square feet (9.3 hectares) of underutilized land from Henderson Land Development. SCMP found that large developers hold vast amounts of rural land in their land banks, with Henderson owning 44.9 million square feet (417 hectares) of rural land at the end of 2019.

In July 2021, Liber Research Community found that developers had begun to hoard land alongside the proposed Northern Link metro line, buying at least 80 hectares of land near the line.

==== Private Recreational Leases ====
Land is also used by private sports clubs, organizations which only pay a minimal amount of money for the government-subsidized land they occupy under "private recreational leases." 27 private recreational leases are used by 24 private sports clubs occupying a total of 828 acres (335 hectares). This includes the Hong Kong Golf Club in Fanling, occupying a 170-hectare (420-acre) site which the Planning Department estimated could be developed into 13,200 homes, enough to house 37,000 people. The Hong Kong Golf Club paid a total HK$2,500,000 in 2017 for rent to the government, only 3% of actual market value, meaning the other 97% is subsidized by the government. The Golf Club charges individuals a full membership fee HK$17,000,000 which means a single person's full membership fee covers almost 7 years of rent for the entire club. In August 2022, a government official, Regina Ip, said that the golf course should not be used for housing. In another example, the Hong Kong Gun Club pays a total HK$1,000 a year to the government despite operating on a 6.5-hectare (16-acre) site and charging individuals a lifetime membership fee of HK$300,000.

In addition to the 27 private sports club sites that occupy 335 hectares, an additional 39 sites used by "community organizations" (such as the Hong Kong Jockey Club) occupy another 67 hectares, giving Private Recreational Leases a total usage of around 400 hectares.

In August 2024, news reported that the Hong Kong Jockey Club would convert some land it leased cheaply from the government (HK$84,600 per year) to build and sell private residences with high potential profit, with one researcher saying that such a plan was unfair and that "The government has leased the land to them at a very favourable price. It is not reasonable for them to profit fully from it."

==== Lease extensions ====
In 2024, the government announced that instead of recovering expiring land leases for redevelopment, it would automatically extend the leases of 300,000 plots of commercial, residential, and industrial land that were originally scheduled to expire by 30 June 2047, by adding another 50 years to their expiration. Of the 300,000 plots of land, around 2,400 were set to expire between June 2025 and 29 June 2047. The remainder and of the 300,000 plots of land were set to expire on 30 June 2047, with the majority of them being in the New Territories. Most leases in New Territories are under this lease, and were already given a 50 year extension from 1997 to 2047.

=== Demand unmatched ===
==== Immigration from mainland China ====
The One-way Permit allows up to 150 mainlanders a day to permanently move to Hong Kong, a policy that increases demand and pricing for housing. In a 2019 research study named "A Tale of Two Cities: The Impact of Cross-Border Migration on Hong Kong's Housing Market," the empirical research determined that 3.67% of all purchases were made by those from mainland China. The study notes that "We provide additional evidence that mainland Chinese buyers create an upward price momentum in Hong Kong's housing market. Although their percentage is only 3.7% of the entire buyer population, the momentum they create can be quite influential and drive up the market."

Additionally, approximately 20% out of all family applicants of Public Rental Housing were found to be those who came on One-way permits.

In 2011, mainland Chinese accounted for 11% of all home sales, and 30.2% of new home sales. In 2019, 8.4% of all home sales were by mainland Chinese.

==== Money laundering ====
As mainland China has strict control on flow of capital, it has become difficult for wealthy people in mainland China to move their assets overseas. However, the underground money transfer market has made it easy for these people to avoid relevant restrictions and transfer millions or billions of dollars into Hong Kong. Under the arrangement of one country, two systems, Hong Kong has become a convenient spot for wealthy people in mainland China to transfer money out of mainland China government's capital control. Much of the money has gone into the housing market of Hong Kong in the process, resulting in a spike in property prices.

=== Desire to keep housing price high ===
==== Hong Kong government ====
The government collects a significant portion of its revenue from housing, specifically from stamp duty collection and land premium. As stamp duty is based on transaction price, higher transaction prices generate more income for the government, giving the government a conflict of interest when seeking to reduce the price of housing. CNBC has reported on the conflict of interest, saying "If property values drop, the government can't generate as much revenue, meaning there's little incentive to seriously curb Hong Kong's cost of housing." As noted in the Routledge Handbook of Contemporary Hong Kong, "The enormous land sales income is made possible because of the existence of a highly lucrative property market, which is itself the result of the government's 'high premiums, low rents' policy."

According to the Legislative Council, in recent years, housing-related revenue has accounted for anywhere between 27.4% - 42.0% of total government revenue.

Government revenue by item (HK$ billion)
	2015-2016	2016-2017	2017-2018	2018-2019
Stamp duties	62.7 (13.9%)	61.9 (10.8%)	95.2 (15.4%)	100.0 (16.5%)
Land premium	60.9 (13.5%)	128.0 (22.3%)	164.8 (26.6%)	121.0 (20.0%)
Total	123.6 (27.4%)	189.9 (33.1%)	260.0 (42.0%)	221.0 (36.5%)

All revenue collected through land premium is used for the Capital Works Reserve Fund (CWRF), which by law, can only be spent on infrastructure and land production, rather than going to social services, unless specifically requested by the government. According to Liber Research Community, this system is an "infrastructure-land capital revolving door", where high land premiums pay for new land production, which is then sold at high premiums to continue the cycle.

According to a former deputy director of lands, lease modifications, where premium is required to be paid in order to change lease terms (such as converting an industrial plot to residential) is fundamentally flawed.

When a plot of land is put up for auction by the government, "The government will not sell a site if no bid reaches the reserve price as assessed by the government's professional valuers," restricting the amount of land available for usage and setting a minimum floor on land prices. The reserve price is also kept secret. One professor has said "The government has refused to tell the reserve price, and I hope it can reveal the figures. It can increase transparency and facilitate developers in setting their bids." Since 2019, at least 8 plots of land have been withdrawn from public sale. In February 2023, a plot of land in Oyster Bay was withdrawn by the MTR Corporation after it received 3 bids.

In March 2023, Financial Secretary Paul Chan said that "We can say that the government does not have a high land price policy, which had drawn criticism in the past. But we won't sell land at dirt cheap prices either."

As of September 2023, out of 18 pieces of land put to auction in the financial year, 17 were withdrawn from sale. An SCMP editorial noted that the government should release more land, and that the government "cannot sit on its land reserves until the market picks up again, as a prolonged suspension of land supply will cut housing output in the long run."

In January 2024, the government announced that it would suspend the sale of residential and commercial land, citing previous land sale auctions that did not meet the government's minimum reserve. The halt was the first in 13 years, and was planned to last 3 months.

In July 2024, the government said it would only offer one plot of land for auction in the entire second quarter of the financial year, and said only one plot had been sold in the financial year so far. For the April - June quarter, the single plot of land sold could support approximately only 280 residential flats. After the government rejected a bid on a separate land sale, it said that "The government will not sell a site if no bid reaches the reserve price as assessed by the government's professional valuers. This is in the interest of protecting public revenue." In the final financial quarter of 2024, the government offered only a single plot of land, enough for around 745 units.

In October 2024, Chief Executive John Lee announced two measures designed to inflate property prices: changing the maximum loan-to-value of properties from 60% to 70%, allowing for buyers to borrow more money, and allowing property purchases to partially count as investments under the New Capital Investment Entrant Scheme visa.

In October 2024, former Chief Executive CY Leung cautioned that "For now, there is a shortage of land and housing supply in Hong Kong, but in the future, more supply is not always better."

==== Chinese Communist Party officials ====
Around the time of handover of Hong Kong in 1997, relatives of Chinese Communist Party officials have started to invest money into Hong Kong en masse. Investigations by The New York Times have found at least three of the top four leadership of the Chinese Communist Party buying properties worth over US$51 million in Hong Kong. For example, Li Zhanshu, the third-highest-ranked member of the Chinese Communist Party, had his daughter purchase a beachside townhouse worth over US$15 million. Such sort of investments have been seen as incentive for party officials to keep the property price in Hong Kong high, with for example Li Zhanshu leading the passage of the Hong Kong National Security Law which suppressed opposition whose activities might affect the value of housing in Hong Kong. Other top-ranked communist party officials like Xi Jinping and Wang Yang have also been discovered to have relatives making similar investments into Hong Kong. Those relatives of Chinese Communist Party officials, also known as Princelings, have formed connections with elites in Hong Kong.

==== Property owners ====
After the Asian financial crisis in the late 1990s, Hong Kong's housing prices dropped almost half from the peak. It has caused the net worth of many citizens to drop significantly, and resulted in many cases of negative equity due to mortgage loan among citizens who have purchased residential units during the previous bubble era, resulting in social problems. At the time, the Hong Kong government have enacted policies accordingly to prevent the property price from further dropping by tightening supply and stimulating demand, in order to change the direction of housing price trend in Hong Kong. Many of those policies have since been cancelled, but their effect, as well as the cause behind these policies, are still affecting the city's housing market till modern time.

In 2023, property owners in Kai Tak opposed a plan by the government to build temporary, "light public housing" in the neighborhood, which SCMP writer Alice Wu said was a case of "not in my backyard," or NIMBYism. Lawmaker Kitson Yang represented the residents and cast the only abstained vote on the plan to build it.

==== Developers and real estate agencies ====
In October 2022, Stewart Leung, executive committee chairman of the Real Estate Developers Association (REDA), which represents the city's biggest developers, argued that prices should not drop, saying "Even if home prices do not rise, do not let them fall."

In January 2023, Leung from REDA said that developers would "make a lot of noise" if the government decided to repurpose a community isolation facility into public housing in Kai Tak, and said "Repurposing that facility will ruin the entire Kai Tak area."

In September 2023, Stephen Ng, chairman of The Wharf Group, said that the government should remove cooling measures and stop the drop in housing prices. Adrian Cheng, head of New World, also joined in and said cooling measures should be dropped. According to property agents, developers may also delay launching new projects until the government announces cooling measures.

In October 2023, both Emperor International and Habitat Property said that the government should remove cooling measures. Midland Realty, a large broker, further repeated the calls. Additionally, Leung from REDA said that stamp duties on property should be fully eliminated at once, rather than gradually, to stop the reduction in housing prices. JLL Hong Kong also said that the measures should be removed and were "completely inapplicable in today's market," and Colliers Hong Kong said that removing the special stamp duty would benefit property prices the most. The chairman of Centaline said "If the government wants to achieve a desirable result, it needs to remove all the punitive stamp duties."

In response to calls to remove anti-speculation methods, Liber Research Community said that "The suggestion to relax cooling measures can exacerbate the unaffordability of housing which the government has claimed to tackle. It is inappropriate for the government to let property developers take a 'free ride' at the expense of citizens' well-being."

In November 2023, the government began legal proceedings against real estate agencies Midland Holdings and Centaline, accusing them of collaborating with each other and setting a minimum net commission rate of 2%, the rate that real estate agencies receive from developers, after deducting expenses. Subsidiaries of the two companies, including Midland Realty, Hong Kong Property, and Ricacorp were also involved.

In February 2024, the chairman of Midland Realty said that "Now is the time to remove all kinds of property cooling measures to revitalise the market."

==== Political organizations and lawmakers ====
In August 2023, the Heung Yee Kuk's chairman, Kenneth Lau, said that the government should get rid of measures used to reduce speculation, such as extra stamp duties, and said now was the "best time" to do so. In February 2024, during a fortune telling event, Lau repeated his opinion and said removal of stamp duties would also boost the stock market.

In September 2023, Democratic Alliance for the Betterment and Progress (DAB) lawmaker Holden Chow suggested cutting stamp duties when buyers purchase a second home from 15% to 6%, a stamp duty meant to reduce speculation and increases in home prices. In February 2024, the DAB listed the "complete scrapping of spicy measures" as a top priority for the government's budget plan.

In October 2023, lawmakers Jimmy Ng Wing-ka and Tony Tse Wai-chuen also called on the government to lift anti-speculation property curbs. In January 2024, lawmaker Doreen Kong joined in, and said "In fact, we want property speculation [to enliven the market]."

The Business and Professionals Alliance for Hong Kong (BPA) party has also advocated for removing all stamp duties.

In January 2024, Regina Ip, convenor of the Executive Council said that the new residential stamp duty and double stamp duty for non-permanent residents should be eliminated.

In February 2024, the DAB and BPA were joined by the New People's Party and Liberal Party, saying that all cooling measures should be eliminated.

== Effects of high housing cost ==
Due to the high costs of housing, some people in Hong Kong have found both legal and illegal means to minimize costs or increase the size of their property.

=== Small unit size ===
In January 2021, Liber Research Community found that 13% of all newly constructed units in 2019 were "nano flats" and smaller than 260 square feet (24 m^{2}). The government can therefore claim that more units are being constructed on an annual basis, without disclosing what percentage of the units are nano flats, and without disclosing total floor area being created. One estimate projected that 20% of 18,000 new private flats created in the next 5 years would be smaller than 215 square feet.

=== Evasion of Stamp Duty ===
Newman Investment, a subsidiary of the Liaison Office, has been purchasing property without paying stamp duty, even though Newman is a registered private company. It has been found to have been exempted from several hundred million HKD in stamp duty in the past few years, meaning the government has subsidized purchases for Newman, and that even Beijing's Liaison Office does not want to pay the normal costs of stamp duty.

Stamp duty can be evaded or minimized in other ways, including methods used by Secretary of Justice Teresa Cheng and her husband, Otto Poon Lok-to. Even though Cheng already owned other properties, one of her later purchases was entitled to the "first-time buyer" stamp duty as her earlier purchases were registered to companies she owns and not her directly, saving her HK $6.7 million in stamp duty. Her husband, Otto Poon Lok-to, used another method to escape HK $10 million in stamp duty by purchasing a company that owned a flat at 1 Robinson Road, giving him ownership of the flat (via ownership of the company) without paying any stamp duty. A report by Liber Research Community found that between 2010 and 2018, a total of HK $9.4 billion of stamp duty was evaded by using company share transfers.

=== Illegal structures and unauthorized developments ===
Approximately 25% of all residential property in Hong Kong has been illegally modified to add extra space or other features. In December 2024, SCMP reported that 50% of village houses that were inspected had illegal structures. Even several high-profile government officials have been caught with illegal structures in their properties, including Secretary of Justice Teresa Cheng, former Chief Secretary Henry Tang Ying-yen, and former Chief Executives Donald Tsang and CY Leung.

In August 2022, news reported that Secretary for Housing Winnie Ho had an illegal structure for 14 years after the government had asked her to take it down.

In February 2023, the Ombudsman said that in village houses, 1/3rd of all government orders to remove unauthorized structures were ignored; there were 5,384 removal orders among the village houses by the end of 2021.

In August 2023, the Ombudsman said that the government receives about 1,500 complaints about unauthorized developments per year. In September 2023, the government said that it prosecutes about 3,000 cases per year.

In September 2023, heavy rains caused landslides which revealed several houses at Redhill Peninsula to have illegal structures, with Chief Executive John Lee saying "Those who need to be prosecuted will be prosecuted, and structures that have to be demolished will be demolished." A report by Liber Research Community found more than 173 luxury houses which were suspected to have illegal structures extending onto government land. Later, Lee said that he was "serious" about fixing the issue of unauthorized developments. The government announced in January 2024 that 70 out of 85 inspected houses at Redhill Peninsula had either illegal structures, encroached on government land, or both. In addition, the government said that 14 out of 28 seafront-facing houses at Beaulieu Peninsula in Tuen Mun used government land without permission.

Currently, owners of village houses can declare their unauthorized structures to the government that do not pose immediate safety risks, allowing them to escape any penalties from having unauthorized structures. Under the program, owners who reported their illegal structures would not need to immediately remove them.

In February 2024, a land surveyor said that the government should enact a law to require that professionals check for unauthorized structures before any sale of a property can be completed. An opinion writer on SCMP had similar sentiment and said that occupancy permits for buyers of property should not be issued until there is certification that the unit is in full compliance, and said Chief Executive John Lee must act immediately.

In August 2024, the High Court dismissed a bid by 876 homeowners, who unsuccessfully tried to appeal government orders to remove their unauthorized structures.

In June 2025, two property owners were fined a total of around HK$110,000 for carrying out unauthorized development work at their luxury homes, with a lawmaker saying the penalty was too light and that "This is not a good message sent to the public regarding the government's crackdown on illegal structures. It shows that no matter how severe the maximum penalty can be, in the end the sentence will be light."

=== Social instability ===
Media like New York Times and BBC have linked the housing situation in Hong Kong to the series of protests in the territory in 2010s.

Such explanations have been used by Beijing-owned news agencies and newspapers in September 2019 to describe the housing situation as the root cause of the 2019–20 Hong Kong protests to dismiss other discussed causes of the protests which includes striving against increased control from China and for democracy. Those media criticized property developers in Hong Kong as being responsible for housing shortage and high housing price that resulted in social instability and protests, after one of the property developers, Li Ka-shing, issued a statement about the protest against the party line. These mainland China Government controlled media have also criticized developers for hoarding land, and not developing sites to meet the housing shortage, as part of their attempt to attribute the blame.

=== Public housing ===
==== Deception ====
Public housing requires income and assets to be below a certain threshold; some people in public housing have been caught lying about their income and assets above those thresholds, defrauding citizens who are on the waiting list for public housing.

Approximately 1.6% of owners have been found to buy and resell their Home Ownership Scheme flats within 3–5 years after purchasing them at a subsidized rate, profiting on average by 102%.

In 2021, approximately 1,300 public housing units were taken back by the government from public housing residents due to tenancy abuse and tenancy agreement violations, including subletting to other people, non-domestic usage, or declaring their assets lower than their true value.

In November 2022, the government said that 26 households from public housing were found making false declarations about their income and other assets.

In February 2023, SCMP reported that Kwong Kau, the ex father-in-law of Abby Choi, bought a subsidized Home Ownership Scheme apartment, despite being the owner of a separate HK$73 million apartment. The Permanent Secretary for Housing, Agnes Wong, confirmed that the government does not verify the assets of Green Form Subsidised Home Ownership Scheme applicants. Wong also said both income and assets of Green Form applicants have not been verified since the Scheme was started in the 1970s.

In March 2023, Winnie Ho said that about 690 households per year are found to exceed the maximum allowed income or assets for the subsidized housing. For the 2022-2023 year, the government reclaimed more than 2,200 public housing units from tenants who abused public housing resources or broke terms of their lease. Some violations included leaving the unit vacant for long periods of time, not paying the subsidized rent, subletting or renting out the unit on Airbnb, or using it for non-housing purposes.

In June 2023, the Housing Department set up an agreement with the Land Registry to check if public housing tenants owned any property.

Those in public housing over the age of 60 do not have to declare their income or assets, as well as those receiving Comprehensive Social Security Assistance, and those eligible for Disability Allowance. In August 2023, the chairman of the Housing Authority suggested raising the limit to 65, to filter out wealthy tenants.

In August 2023, the Legislative Council published a report, suggesting that those who rely on government welfare, such as public housing, may seek government benefits rather than higher wages.

In October 2023, the government began to ask tenants of public housing (except those exempted above) to declare their assets every 2 years.

In November 2023, the Housing Authority found more than 50 households living in public housing who also owned other apartments in Hong Kong, against public housing rules. The 50+ households were found by checking 25,000 declaration forms, with a total of 719,000 checks to be performed by the end of 2025. The Housing Authority also said that it had reports of public housing residents who owned property across the border in mainland China, and confirmed one report in October 2023.

As of August 2024, 5,000 public units had been recovered by the government in the past 2 years due to finding rich tenants. Tenants who exceed 5 times the income limit or 100 times the net wealth limit are required to move out of government housing. In addition, tenants who own private property in Hong Kong, Macau, or mainland China are also required to move out of government housing.

In August 2024, a couple nicknamed "Mr and Mrs Ho" were in local media as the wife lived in a public housing unit, with the husband not added to the household registry in an attempt to hide his assets from the government.

In October 2024, the government said it would look into cases where some elderly tenants primarily lived in mainland China but continued to hold onto their public housing units in Hong Kong.

In October 2024, the government announced that it would offer a HK$3000 reward to people who provide sufficient information to catch people in public housing who are abusing the system.

==== Misallocation ====
In May 2024, an opinion article written by an HKU professor and student concluded that public housing had income limits which were too high, leading to well-off applicants being granted public housing. In addition, the report found that even those with high income in public housing would still be paying minimal rent for public housing, relative to their income.

Public housing tenants who exceed the income limit by 5x or whose net assets exceed the limit by 100x are required to move out of public housing.

==== Purposely lowering income ====
In July 2024, Chief Executive John Lee warned that people should not deliberately lower their income below the public housing limits, in an attempt to remain eligible for public housing. According to the government, income limits for public housing were HK$12,940 per month for single applicants, or HK$19,730 for two-person families. The government released data showing that 52% of public housing applicants in 2022 had graduated from university or post-graduate studies.

In October 2024, a survey showed that around 30% of Hongkongers would purposely decline pay raises and "lie flat" to lower their income and maintain eligibility for public housing.

In March 2025, a lawmaker said that even those who make minimum wage may quit their jobs to stay below the maximum income level allowed for public housing.

==== Commercial usage ====
In January 2025, a government official stated that some public housing units had been converted and used for commercial purposes, including tutoring centers, gyms, storage areas, and short term rentals. Hong Kong's ombudsman found that in 2024, 12,407 cases of public housing misuse were reported, but the government only prosecuted around 4% of the cases, with the ombudsman saying "Some abuse cases are found with enough evidence, yet the prosecution period has already passed."

== Proposals to address high housing cost ==
Due to recurring issues with housing unaffordability, the government commissioned the Task Force on Land Supply in 2017, which in 2019, presented a report to the Legislative Council with suggestions on increasing the supply of housing. The government's response was that Chief Executive ordered that all recommendations by the Task Force be accepted.

=== Vacancy tax ===
Carrie Lam proposed a vacancy tax in June 2018 for new units which were still unsold 12 months after being issued an occupation permit, a tax which would punish developers who leave new units unsold for a long time. The bill was later shelved; in response, a member of the Liber Research Community said that the government had sacrificed citizens and protected developers by shelving the bill. According to the Legislative Council, unsold units amounted to 12,300 total units at the end of 2020. By September 2024, the number of unsold units rose to 19,000.

The general vacancy rate, including both old and new units, but excluding village housing, has been at around 4% of all units over the past decade. In 2020, the general vacancy rate was 4.3%, meaning 52,366 units were empty.

In January 2023, Paul Chan said that the government had decided against implementing a vacancy tax.

=== Mainland China government ===
In July 2021, Xia Baolong, director of China's Hong Kong and Macau Affairs Office at the time, stated that before 2049, "We expect Hong Kong society to be more harmonious and peaceful, and the housing problems that we are all concerned about will have been greatly improved. We will bid farewell to subdivided flats and ‘cage homes'".

In July 2022, General Secretary of the Chinese Communist Party Xi Jinping said that "Currently, the biggest aspiration of Hong Kong people is to lead a better life, in which they will have more decent housing." Xi also said that the government should "break the barriers of vested interests."

In March 2023, Wang Huning told Hong Kong delegates to the NPC that they should tackle housing issues as a priority.

== Old buildings ==
2023, Hong Kong

Old buildings have had incidents where concrete has fallen from height and injured people; at least 24 incidents happened in July-August 2023. Mandatory inspection orders were created by the government starting in 2012, with the intent of inspecting buildings over 3 stories and 30 years old, and having them repaired if necessary. Some buildings are classified as "three-nil buildings" - buildings which do not have a property maintenance company, owners' corporation, or residents' association, leaving no organization to follow the mandatory inspection orders. Some such buildings are largely owned by development companies, with the intent to raze and redevelop the site. The Consumer Council has proposed relaxing rules so that instead of 100% consent for approval to change the deed of mutual covenant (DMC), only 75% approval would be needed, giving old buildings a higher chance of updating rules regarding maintenance.

As of May 2023, almost 2,700 buildings have failed to complete their mandatory inspections within their 1 year deadlines. These buildings have been described as "ticking time bombs."

Under the Urban Renewal Authority (URA), old apartments can be redeveloped by giving existing owner-occupiers money to buy a comparable 7-year old flat, which experts have criticized as being too much and part of a "double subsidy," as the URA must pay money for buying old buildings as well as to homeowners on new housing prices.

In March 2025, the government began to trial a program that would give "three-nil buildings" an affordable property management service at select locations.

=== Fire safety ===
In April 2024, after a fire killed 5 people in a building, it was revealed that the building had ignored government orders to enhance fire safety. Official data also showed that other buildings with similar issues ignored government orders to enhance fire safety more than 60% of the time. More than 9,500 buildings had failed to obey government orders as of April 2024.

An opinion article in SCMP noted that the government may be unable to fully recuperate costs for performing fire safety work if building owners continue ignoring government orders. The article also noted that it was possible that the government may have granted guest house licenses in New Lucky House, despite the building not being up to fire safety code.

In August 2025, after a fire killed a resident of a building, news reported that the owners of the building had ignored mandatory government inspections for 7 years.

On 26 November 2025, after more than 100 people were killed at the Wang Fuk Court fire, it was revealed that the government had previously issued warnings over fire safety at the site, including one on 20 November 2025.

=== Redevelopment ===
Under previous rules, for buildings 50 years or older, at least 80% of owners must consent in order for the land to be redeveloped. For those buildings less than 50 years old, the threshold is 90%. In July 2024, the government announced reduced thresholds for redeveloping old buildings, lowering the threshold to as low as 65% in some cases.

=== Corruption and bid-rigging ===
In December 2025, Bernadette Linn Hon-ho, Secretary for Development, said that some property owners had infiltrated owners' corporations and participated in illegal activities when planning for building maintenance.

In January 2026, the government arrested a contractor for bribing project consultants and an incorporated owners' group to secure a renovation contract. Several organizations said that the government should make bid-rigging illegal. Bid-ridding has been described as a way for consultants to offer unusually-low prices for their services, in exchange for hiring a partner contractor.

In March 2026, an official from the Competition Commission said that "The commission has observed persistent, systemic, and widespread anti-competitive behaviours" in Hong Kong.

In April 2026, a clerk testified that when she tried to verify some proxy votes from homeowners, she found out that sometimes the votes were not authentic. The government had previously warned, in January 2026, that homeowners should not hand over their votes to strangers who claim they are from certain organizations, saying that doing so could allow people to hijack votes.

In June 2026, a government official who oversees the Operations Review Committee said that "... I can say that the building maintenance sector has always been a problematic industry, one that the ICAC has consistently focused on."

== See also ==
- List of most expensive houses in Hong Kong
- List of tallest buildings in Hong Kong
- Architecture of Hong Kong
- Bedspace apartment
- Subdivided flat
- Demographics of Hong Kong
- Economy of Hong Kong
- Asian property market
- Land and the Ruling Class in Hong Kong, a book related to the housing of the city
