= Subdivided flat =

Type of flat

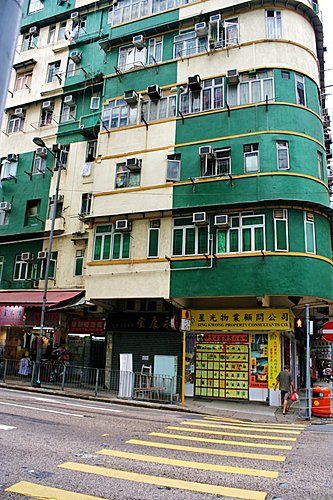
The exterior appearance of subdivided flats

Subdivided flats (also called subdivided units) are flats divided into two or more separate units to house more people. The flats' original partition walls are usually removed, and new ones are erected. New toilets and kitchens are installed, and internal drains are added or altered. These updates can compromise the building's safety and hygiene.

== Hong Kong ==
It is estimated that 280,000 people live in subdivided flats or other similarly undesirable conditions, mostly located in old residential buildings. According to a study by the Society for Community Organization, people living in subdivided flats are mainly unemployed citizens, low-income families and new immigrants. The median living area per person of a subdivided flat was found to be 40 square feet for small suite and 30 square feet (2.8 sqm) for cubicle in 2009.

=== Causes ===
==== Housing shortage ====
The insufficient supply of housing in Hong Kong is one of the important forces leading to subdivided units. According to the Grassroots Housing Rental Price Research Report 2011, released by the Society for Communication Organisation, the Hong Kong government's failure to accurately forecast future housing demand is the leading cause of the shortage. After the government reduced the building of public housing from three million units to half a million units per year in 2006, the demand for public housing increased sharply. The waiting list for public housing increased from 129,000 to 152,000 in 2010 (a 17.8% rise within one year). As a result of the long wait, many people turned to subdivided flats, where the rentals are much cheaper than private housing.

==== Wealth disparity ====
The second factor leading to the increased practice of subdividing flats is the widening wealth gap. Hong Kong's Gini Coefficient, (measure of income inequality), increased to 0.539. In the Subdivided Units Study Report 2009 produced by the Society of Communication Organisation, the median monthly income of residents living in subdivided units was $3200 HKD, below the city's median monthly income population.

Soaring rental prices compound the problem. The data in the "Private Domestic - Average Rents by Class" report provided by the Rating and Valuation Department found that from 2008 to 2011, rents increased by 15.1%, making it challenging for lower-income residents to afford.

=== Socioeconomic problems ===
==== Physical health ====
Subdivided flats were described as being "human-flesh steamers". The temperature inside is far hotter than it is outdoors, because of poor ventilation. Data from Society for Community Organisation found that the temperature in one flat in Sham Shui Po had reached 38.5 degrees Celsius, six degrees above the roadside figure. Residents are often unable to afford the electricity to air condition, they struggle to survive in unventilated and windowless rooms. Improperly installed plumbing can lead to water seepage and unhygienic conditions.

==== Social relationships ====
Residents in subdivided flats tend to have smaller social circles. Living in such poor conditions may lower their self-esteem. Residents tend to become less sociable and introverted. The overcrowded living environment leads family members to compete for space and is more likely to experience family conflicts.

==== Safety ====
The process of adding non-structural partitions and openings in structural walls can adversely affect their structure, increasing the risk of collapse. Buildings with subdivided flats are densely populated and feature narrow corridors, complicating escape from fire and other dangers.

==== Case study ====
A three-alarm fire occurred in a tenement in June 2011 at 111 Ma Tau Wai Road, killing four people and an unborn child and injuring 19. Some tenants could not find a way out and survivors complained of locked emergency exits. A fire burned Fa Yuen Street in December 2011. Both tragedies revealed the lack of safety of such living arrangements.

=== Solutions ===
The Hong Kong government launched an investigation in April 2011. The Buildings Department made a large scale operation to inspect 150 target buildings every year for rectifying buildings with sub-divided flats. The Buildings Department deployed over 480 professionals and staff to investigate the sub-divided flats. The report showed the success of the investigations. 170 removal orders were issued in January 2012.

Under the Community Care Fund Relocation Allowance, the government launched an assistance programme for occupants to move out of partitioned flats in industrial buildings. Individual tenants can get a $2,100 allowance; 4 tenants or more can receive a $6,100 allowance.

Apart from launching the investigations and providing relocation allowances, the government allows both owners and tenants to consult building professionals to rectify irregularities and report situations to the Buildings Department.

In July 2021, the government announced a bill that would put rent-control limits on certain subdivided flats, the bill was passed on 20 October 2021 and has been incorporated as Part IVA of the Landlord and Tenant (Consolidation) Ordinance (Cap. 7), which took effect on 22 January 2022.

The Rating and Valuation Department is responsible for the implementation of the Ordinance, which include promoting public awareness of the regulatory regime; handling enquiries; providing free advisory and mediatory services to tenants and landlords on tenancy matters; and taking enforcement action as appropriate. The Government has engaged non-governmental organisations to set up six district Service Teams, assisting Rating and Valuation Department to promote the new legislation to implement the tenancy control on subdivided flats at district level; raising public awareness of the new regulatory regime under the new legislation; and handling general enquiries, etc. The Government has also engaged a non-governmental organisation to establish and manage a Tenancy Control of Subdivided Units Information Portal (website: www.sdu-info.org.hk) for sharing of information relevant to tenancy control on subdivided flats for publicity and education purpose.

A new law imposing registration and minimum living standards on subdivided flats was passed in September 2025, with implementation beginning in March 2026. This new law is Hong Kong’s first comprehensive regulatory regime governing the letting of subdivided flats, i.e. the Basic Housing Units Ordinance (Cap.658) (BHUO). According to the new regime, the minimum standards include a toilet and at least 86 square feet of space for each unit.

== United Kingdom ==
Town and Country Planning Act 1990 defines:

(a)the use as two or more separate dwellinghouses of any building previously used as a single dwellinghouse involves a material change in the use of the building and of each part of it which is so used;

—

Residential conversion requires permission.

In the early 1990s nearly third of London housing capacity was attributed to conversion of houses to smaller flats.

== See also ==
- Caged home
- Housing in Hong Kong
- House in multiple occupation
- Secondary Suite
- Gosiwon in South Korea
