= Hong Kong Property Services (Agency) =

Hong Kong Property Services (Agency) Limited 香港置業(地產代理)有限公司
- Company type: Privately owned company
- Industry: Real estate agent
- Founded: 1986
- Headquarters: Hong Kong, People's Republic of China
- Area served: Mainland China, Hong Kong
- Key people: Chairman: Mr. Freddie Wong Kin Yip
- Parent: Midland Holdings
- Website: Hong Kong Property Services (Agency) Limited

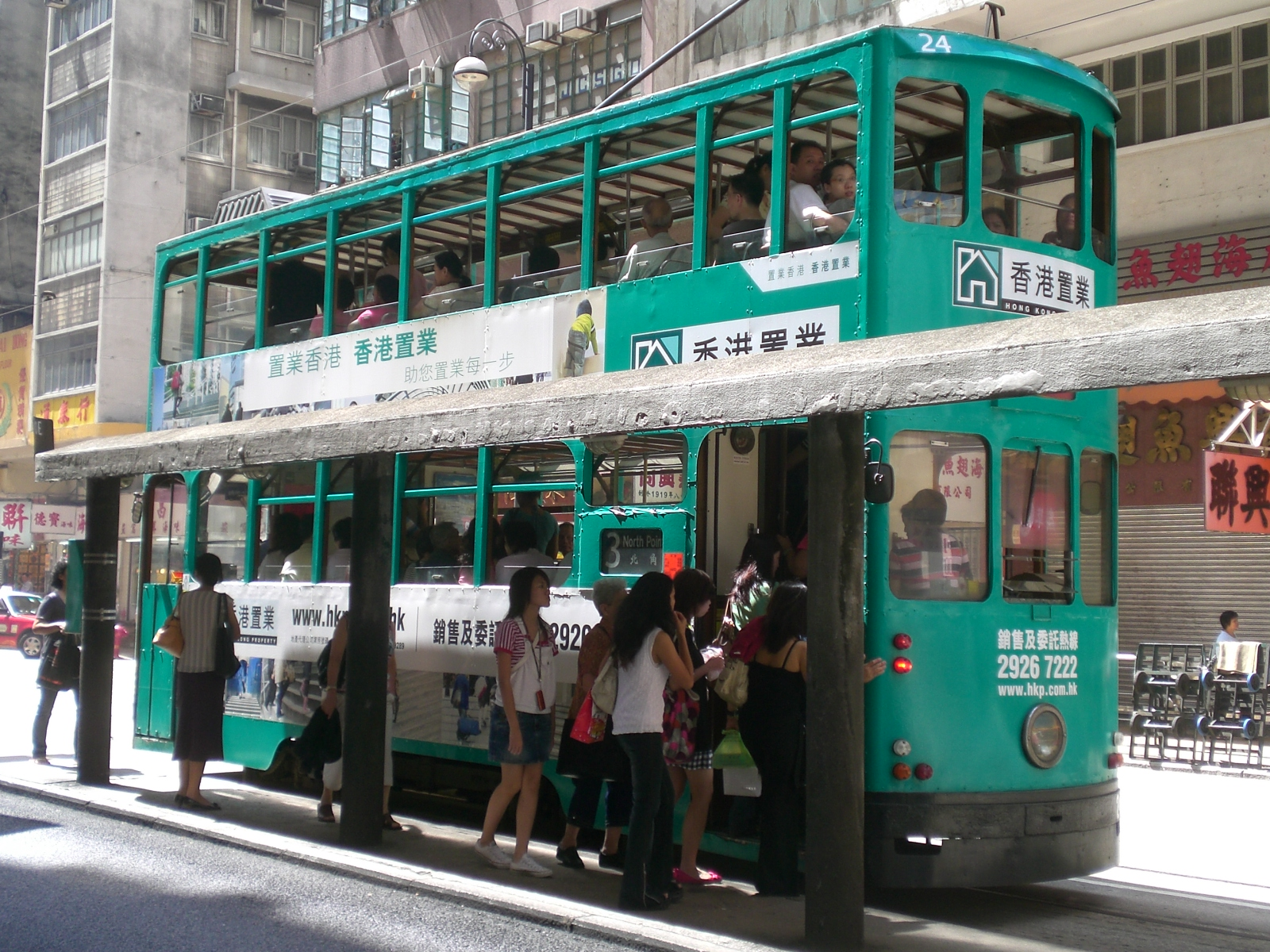
An advertisement of Hong Kong Property Services (Agency) in a tram

Hong Kong Property Services (Agency) Limited (HKPS) is one of the largest real estate brokerage companies in Hong Kong. It was established in 1986. It was acquired by Cheung Kong Holdings in 1996, but sold to Midland Holdings in 2000. It also establishes a subsidiary in Shenzhen to operate its real estate property agent business in Mainland China.
