= Bedspace apartment =

Type of residence

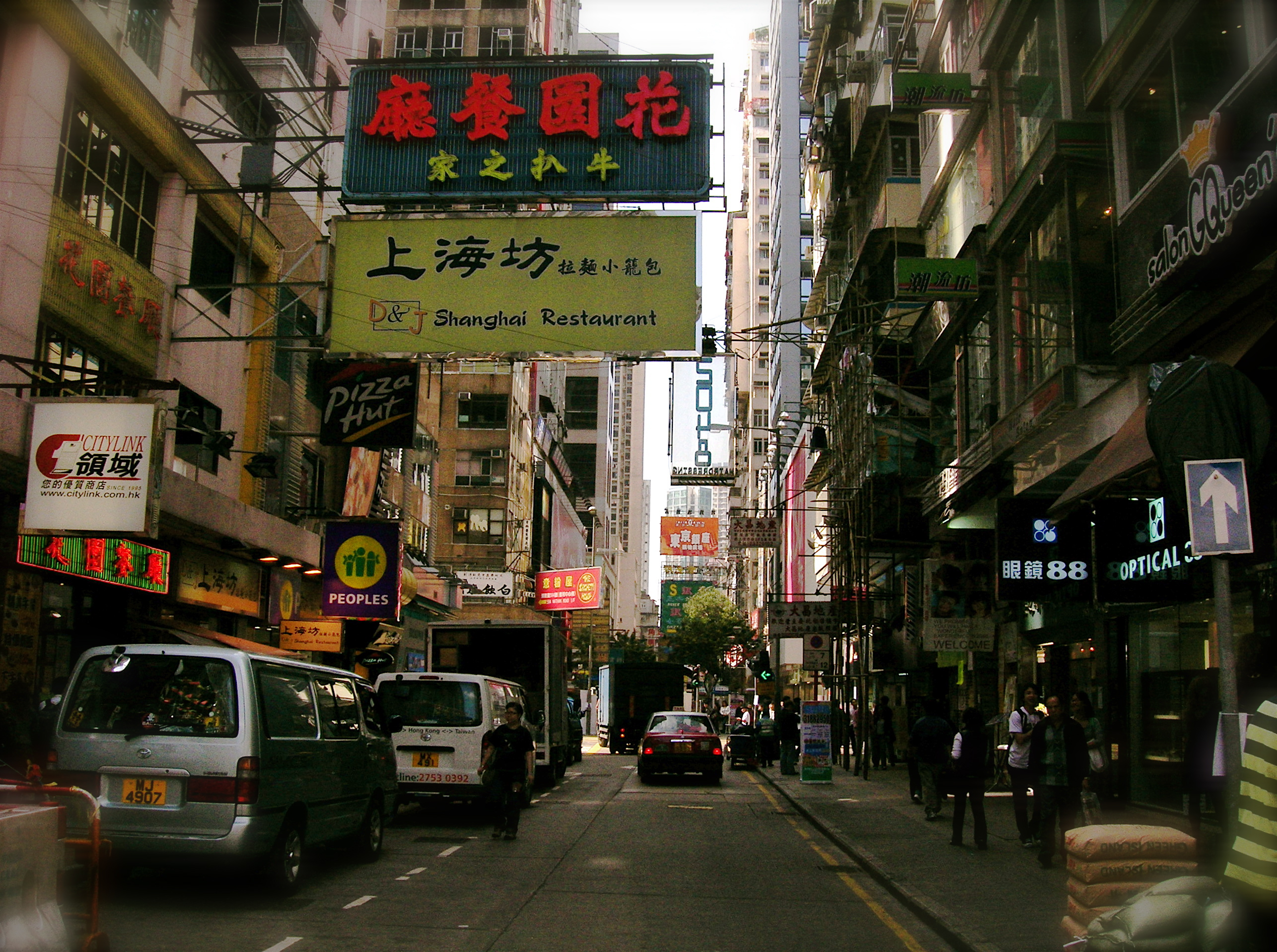
A market street in Mong Kok, a residential district in Hong Kong

A bedspace apartment (Chinese: 牀位寓所; pinyin: chuáng wèi yùsuǒ; Jyutping: cong4 wai2 jyu6so2), also called cage home (籠屋; lóngwū; lung4uk1), coffin cubicle, or coffin home (棺材房; guāncai fáng; gun1coi4 fong2), is a type of residence that is only large enough for one loft bed surrounded by a metal cage. This type of residence originated in Hong Kong, and primarily exists in older urban districts such as Sham Shui Po, Mong Kok, To Kwa Wan, and Tai Kok Tsui. In 2007, there were approximately 53,200 people living in cage homes in Hong Kong.

Generally, the residents are low-income people, including the elderly, drug users, and some low-skilled or unskilled labourers, and people who are physically or mentally ill. Reports from the Legislative Council of Hong Kong found that the people who lived in cage homes were those who did not qualify for social welfare, or subsidised rent or electricity. Most of the residents are male. Safety and other living conditions in bedspace apartments homes are often poor.

While often called cage homes, they are categorised as "bedspace apartments" by the Hong Kong Government. According to the Bedspace Apartment Ordinance, the term "bedspace apartment" refers to a house that contains 12 or more people who rent bedspaces individually. It is legal to run these bedspace apartments, but landlords must first apply for a special license. In July 2021, Xia Baolong, director of China's Hong Kong and Macau Affairs Office at the time, stated that by around 2049, Hong Kong should bid farewell to cage homes.

== History ==
Bedspace apartments started to appear more commonly during the 1950s and 1960s. During the Chinese Civil War, a large number of Chinese mainlanders migrated to Hong Kong, and this, along with a surge in birth rates due to the prospering economy, caused the population to dramatically increase from 2,015,300 in 1951 to 3,129,648 in 1961. In an attempt to cope with the housing demand, the Hong Kong Government started to build several public housing estates. However, the government could not handle the extra burden brought by the Chinese migrant workers, and there were no housing or labour protection policies in place at that time. Cage homes thus became popular among migrant workers, as the rental fee was low.

Today, people still live in cage homes because the Hong Kong government has instituted a single-person scoring system for public housing applications and lowered public housing quotas. In addition, according to a rule already in force before the handover and then transcribed into the Hong Kong Basic Law, new immigrants must wait seven years to become Hong Kong permanent residents. As such, poor immigrants are often forced to live in bedspace apartments until they receive a Hong Kong ID card.

== Environment ==
Bedspace apartments are usually located inside old buildings in urban areas. In the apartment flats, the whole living space is divided into multiple sections. Each section has two to three layers of beds, which are subdivided with metal cages. With no doors, residents have to keep all of their personal belongings inside the confined space. Each bedspace is very narrow, so an adult can barely lie down, stand, or sit straight. Since residents do not have room for any extra personal belongings inside the cage home, such a bedspace is deemed to be a place for sleeping only. Cage homes are dim, cramped, and hot. The temperature can reach 34 °C (93 °F). Residents share the toilets and kitchen, which are notoriously smelly, dirty, and very simple. Often there is no kitchen, just hotplates.

Cage homes also lack privacy because the cages are so close to each other. Even though some modern cage homes have partitions to separate different sections, these typically consist of only a thin piece of wood or paper board.

=== Safety ===
Cage homes generally have poor safety levels, due to their location within old buildings and inadequate fire protection. In 1998, the government set up the Bedspace Apartment Ordinance (Section 18: Precautions for Safety and Sanitation) to regulate fire safety standards and requirements. Nevertheless, licensed cage homes are still located in worn-out buildings which lack smoke detectors, automatic sprinkler systems and fire alarm systems. Worse still, many residents share only one electrical outlet. Electric shocks and leakage frequently occur since the government does not conduct regular inspections to ensure that the various safety measures are up to standard. The Bedspace Apartment Ordinance does not regulate unlicensed cage home apartments or other similar residences that do not fulfill the requirements of being a "bedspace apartment." Thus, these unlicensed cage home apartments do not have sufficient safety equipment.

=== Hygiene ===
Because residents rarely clean the open areas, cage homes are often found to have flies, mosquitoes, mice, and cockroaches. As such, the environment becomes a breeding ground for bacteria, viruses, and diseases. Metal cages are typically made of iron, which rusts easily in the damp climate.

Bedbugs are also a problem.

=== Limited space ===
Since cage homes are often located within older urban districts, they are usually extremely small, the same size as a parking space in the U.S. Such space is only suitable for people to take a rest, thus preventing any additional recreational activities. It is observed that an average of 6 to 12 people typically share a cage home apartment. Under the confined and crowded space, cage homes often have poor ventilation systems. Residents are highly susceptible to respiratory illness. In addition, residents (especially the elderly and disabled) find it difficult to evacuate the building in an emergency.

Residents often try to minimize the time they spend at home.

=== Psychological well-being ===
People who live in cage homes are often victims of destitution. The effect of living in such dilapidated, isolated, and cramped quarters can lead to a higher incidence of mental illness. Some elderly people have described their lives in cage homes as "waiting for death."

=== Licensing ===
As of 2024, current laws require landlords to get a license if there are 12 or more beds inside the apartment. Some landlords put 11 beds inside to avoid having to be licensed.

== Social response ==
According to the Universal Declaration of Human Rights and the International Covenant on Economic, Social and Cultural Rights proposed by the United Nations, cage homes violate the right to housing. Many of Hong Kong's citizens and social organisations have urged the government to construct more public housing estates to replace cage homes for low-income people. The government insists that cage homes should not be eradicated, as there is such a large demand for small apartments in the community. The 1992 film Cageman, directed by Jacob Cheung, demonstrates the harsh living conditions in cage homes and sheds light on the difficulties faced by residents.

=== News response ===
CNN has reported on the living environment of cage homes. It described cage homes as the "size of a shoe box," stating that it was difficult for the rest of the world to believe that such a large number of people are living in such poor accommodations in a so-called wealthy city. The Hong Kong Legislative Council published a report about the problem of cage homes in 2008. The report offered some solutions to the problems of cage homes.

== See also ==
- Flophouse
- Capsule hotel
- Housing in Hong Kong
- Single-room occupancy (SRO)
- Subdivided flat
