= Causes of the 2019–2020 Hong Kong protests =

Historiography of the factors that caused the start of the 2019 protests

The founding cause of the 2019–2020 Hong Kong protests was the proposed legislation of the 2019 Hong Kong extradition bill. However, other causes have been pointed out, such as demands for democratic reform, the Causeway Bay Books disappearances, or a general fear of losing a "high degree of autonomy". The Hong Kong protests are unique in this respect from democracy protests in general, which are often provoked by economic grievances. Subsequent actions by the police, such as mass arrests and police violence, as well as what was perceived to be an illegitimate legislative process of the bill, sparked additional protests throughout the city.

== Causes ==
=== Democratic reform ===
One underlying cause of the protests could be what people consider to be slow pace of democratic reforms.

At the time of the protests, half of the lawmakers of the Legislative Council (LegCo) were directly elected as geographical constituencies, while the rest were returned by functional constituencies, where only selected parts of the electorate had a vote. This ran counter to a section of the Hong Kong population's ongoing demand for universal suffrage since the handover of Hong Kong to China in 1997. Indeed, the ultimate aim of achieving universal suffrage is stated in the Article 45 of the Basic Law, Hong Kong's de facto constitution:

…The method for selecting the Chief Executive shall be specified in the light of the actual situation in the Hong Kong Special Administrative Region and in accordance with the principle of gradual and orderly progress. The ultimate aim is the selection of the Chief Executive by universal suffrage upon nomination by a broadly representative nominating committee in accordance with democratic procedures.

That said, the 2014–2015 Hong Kong electoral reform was voted down. That froze the number of members of the Election Committee, the organ that selects the Chief Executive, or the leader of the city, to 1,200, out of a population of over 7.5 million. Nevertheless the proposed reform only turned the aforementioned Election Committee to a nominating committee for the "universal suffrage" election of the Chief Executive.

In the 6th Legislative Council, a few opposition lawmakers were disqualified after they were elected, namely Yau Wai-ching, Sixtus Leung, Lau Siu-lai, Yiu Chung-yim, Nathan Law and Leung Kwok-hung. These figures did not include people who were disqualified to be a candidate, such as Agnes Chow and Ventus Lau. The court later overturned the disqualification of Agnes Chow and Ventus Lau, years after the by-elections.

The Economist stated Hong Kong people are disillusioned with the promise that "the [Chinese Communist Party] eventually fulfil [sic] its pledge to give them more democracy", as after the 2014 Umbrella Movement and the 2014–2015 electoral reform, "[the] promise would only mean only the chance to vote for someone the party considered royal". While the Financial Times, on 12 June 2019 (date of an anti-bill protest), stated, "Most people in Hong Kong, however, find it hard to believe that Ms. Lam brought this crisis [editor note: extradition bill] upon herself with no help whatsoever from Beijing".

==== Economic factors ====
Economic factors were also an underlying cause of anger among Hongkongers. With powerful business cartels colluding with the government, Hong Kong suffers from income disparity and high housing prices. Youth, who were pre-eminent in the protests, were frustrated by low social mobility and the lack of job opportunities. Many protesters in Hong Kong were under the age of 30, and had received tertiary education. State media in mainland China tend to focus on this reason as the main cause of the protests.

=== Fear of losing rights and freedoms ===
An example of Hong Kong losing its freedoms is its steady fall on the Democracy Index. Despite universal suffrage being part of Hong Kong's basic law in the 2019 report Hong Kong scored 6.02/10 classing it as a flawed democracy, being only 0.02 points of a hybrid regime. Hong Kong also only scored 3.59/10 for Electoral process and pluralism, this was the lowest score in the category for a flawed democracy and scoring lower than some authoritarian countries. Hong Kong came 75 out of 167 and China 153 out of 167.

With the approach of 2047, when the Basic Law is set to expire, along with the constitutional guarantees enshrined within it, sentiments of an uncertain future drove youth to join the protests against the extradition bill.

==== Causeway Bay Books and Xiao Jianhua disappearances ====
Even before the proposed 2019 Hong Kong extradition bill, Hong Kong citizens suspected that mainland Chinese personnel engaged in extra-judicial renditions in the Special Administrative Region (SAR), despite such actions being a breach of Basic Law.

In late 2015, Chinese government agents kidnapped the owner and several staff members of Hong Kong-based Causeway Bay Books, a bookstore that sold politically sensitive publications, to the Mainland as suspects in breaking Mainland law. Lam Wing-kee, who was held in solitary confinement for five months and unable to make any phone calls, claims that he had no choice but to co-operate in reading a scripted forced confession of guilt. He was denied legal representation, forced to implicate others in bookselling crimes, and requested to turn over information about anonymous authors and customers. "They wanted to lock you up until you go mad," he said. Upon his release to Hong Kong he went public with the media to tell his story. Because he had no family in mainland China who could be punished, Lam said that it was easier for him to come forward. He said that he had to be courageous: "I thought about it for two nights before I decided [to] tell you all what happened, as originally and completely as I could ... I also want to tell the whole world. This isn't about me, this isn't about a bookstore, this is about everyone."

In 2017, Xiao Jianhua, a billionaire from Mainland China who had resided in Hong Kong, had also been abducted and disappeared.

These incidents are considered as one of the contributing causes of the protests. Critics have stated that the Central Government is "chipping away the independence of [Hong Kong]'s courts and news media." There is also fear that "the authorities will use [the bill] to send dissidents, activists and others in Hong Kong, including foreign visitors, to face trial in mainland courts, which are controlled by the party."

=== Legislative process of 2019 Hong Kong extradition bill ===
The government's attitude on legislating the Hong Kong extradition bill was seen as sparking the protests. The government was viewed as unwilling to budge, despite opposition from various sectors of the community.

For instance, businessmen usually in support of the government opposed the bill. One example was Michael Tien, a legislative councillor. He openly urged Chief Executive Carrie Lam to withdraw the bill in May 2019. He also proposed an alternative route to handle the murder case of Poon Hiu-wing,. (Note: The murder in Taiwan was the government's stated reason to revise the existing extradition bill to extradite the suspect from Hong Kong to Taiwan.) He claimed that his proposal received support from the business sector. However, the government proceeded to move the bill forward.

Other sectors also reacted. A record-breaking number of lawyers participated in a silent march against the bill on 6 June.

On 9 June, reportedly over a million citizens demonstrated when the Legislative Council was about to resume the process of the second reading. The demonstration took place since pro-government (and pro-Beijing) lawmakers held a majority in the Legislative Council and would mean the ultimate passage of the bill. (Note: Despite the pro-government has a majority, it was after the disqualifications of lawmakers and re-election of some of the seats. Moreover, they has a majority in functional constituencies, but almost the same number of seats from geographical constituencies. 5 out of 6 disqualified lawmakers (see above section) were from geographical constituencies. Lastly, Michael Tien was a rogue member of the pro-government camp in the legislation of the extradition bill.) The proposed resumption of the second reading sparked the 12 June protest that became a civil conflict. On 15 June, Carrie Lam declared the indefinite suspension of the legislative process. However, from 15 June until 4 September, Lam refused to withdraw the bill. Her reluctance stood against the protesters' demands.

On 23 October the bill was withdrawn but the protests have widened for universal suffrage for Legislative Council and Chief Executive election and the resignation of Carrie Lam.

=== Accusation of police violence on 12 June protest and subsequent events that related to the police ===
A range of sectors find the police response to protests to have sustained the movements. These include participants of subsequent protests (those after 9 June), as well as many pan-democrats lawmakers, academicians and critics, although they differ in attributing the size of the responsibility to the force.

Moreover, even Pierre Chan, a legislator that declared his neutrality between the police and protesters in July, participated in an assembly of physicians and nurses that condemned excessive use of police force in August 2019.

Protesters and others highlighted instances where the use of police force was considered excessive.

For example, on 12 June, even though protesters gathered around CITIC Tower, an area where protests were theoretically legal with the issuance from the police of a permit that known officially as the Letter of No Objection, the police still used tear gas pellets. Councillors of the Independent Police Complaints Council later stated that if the use of tear gas was indeed proved, it was unsatisfactory (Chinese: 不理想). The actions of the police, at least in part, contributed to the large turnout of the subsequent protest. The organiser claimed that 2 million citizens participated in the march on 16 June, although other sources estimated smaller turnouts. Nevertheless, most sources concluded that it was an all-time high record.

Meanwhile, the negligence of the police and the accused collusion with the criminals during Yuen Long attack on 21 July, had spread the protest into Yuen Long, a satellite town in the New Territories. Under Public Order Ordinance, protests are required to obtain the Letter of No Objection to stage a rally or protest. However, the police instead issued a Letter of Objection days before, declaring any such protests illegal . Nevertheless, many citizens still gathered there. They expressed their criticisms of the police by visiting Yuen Long with excuses such as shopping. Some of the protesters engaged in violent actions during 27 July protest. However, when the protesters were leaving and retreating upon police request, the police also used force to try to arrest protesters. Once again, pan-democrats lawmakers had signed a petition to condemn the violence of the police and accuse the force used by the police during the clearance of the location of nearly engaging in a revenge (Chinese: 近乎報復). They also stated that issuing Letters of Objection would create a vicious circle that only would instigate more citizens to protest.

Indeed, protests did not cease. More and more tear gas were used by the police, as well as the use of bean bag rounds and Rubber bullets. Not only on the Hong Kong Island, the use of force by the police had spread along with the protests, which police had used tear gas in most of the satellite towns of the city. On 5 August protest along, the police had used around 800 rounds of tear gas. Many organisations have criticised the actions of the police from that single day.

The Hong Kong branch of Amnesty International condemned the police behaviour during the events. For example, on 12 August, after more than 2 months of protests (since 9 June, or more than 2 months if counting April protests) and right after the 11 August protests, the branch had declared "Hong Kong police have once again used tear gas and rubber bullets in a way that have fallen [sic] short of international standards. Firing at retreating protesters in confined areas where they had little time to leave goes against the purported objective of dispersing a crowd".

Arrested protesters have alleged sexual violence by police officers. Some assembly of the protests were dedicated to the theme of protesting police sexual violence.

All international counsellor of the Independent Police Complaints Council had been withdrew from the commission in protest against the collaboration of IPCC and the police force. One former member, Clifford Stott, published his own version of report, blaming the police had a play in the escalation of violence.

== Allegations of foreign influence ==
The Chinese Central Government accused the protests of being affected by foreign influence. Ip Kwok-him, a former pro-establishment lawmaker of the LegCo and a standing Executive Council member, also made a similar accusation. A senior officer from the HKPF told CNN that "they have seen no evidence that foreign governments financed or inspired the protest movement." in August, during a background briefing to a group of journalists.

== Impact ==
After the June demonstrations, protesters had stated their 5 key demands. One version contained "Implementation of genuine universal suffrage", despite some reported version in June, substituted "universal suffrage" to "Carrie Lam resign" or the reported version just had 4 key demands.

The other 4 key demands were "withdraw the extradition bill"; "officially retract characterisation of the protests as a riot"; "drop charges against protesters"; as well as "launch an independent commission of inquiry into matters relating to the anti-extradition bill protests".
