= Ricacorp Properties =

Hong Kong real estate company

Ricacorp Properties Limited 利嘉閣地產代理有限公司
- Company type: privately owned company
- Industry: Real estate agent
- Founded: 1981
- Headquarters: Hong Kong, People's Republic of China
- Area served: Mainland China, Hong Kong, Macau
- Key people: Chairman: Ms. Janet Shih; CEO:Mr. Willy Liu
- Parent: Centaline Holdings
- Divisions: Ricacorp (C.I.R) Properties; Ricacorp (Macau) Properties limited Ricacorp Mortgage Agency; Ricacorp (Zhuhai) Properties limited Ricacorp Overseas Property & Immigration Consultant Limited
- Website: Ricacorp Properties Limited

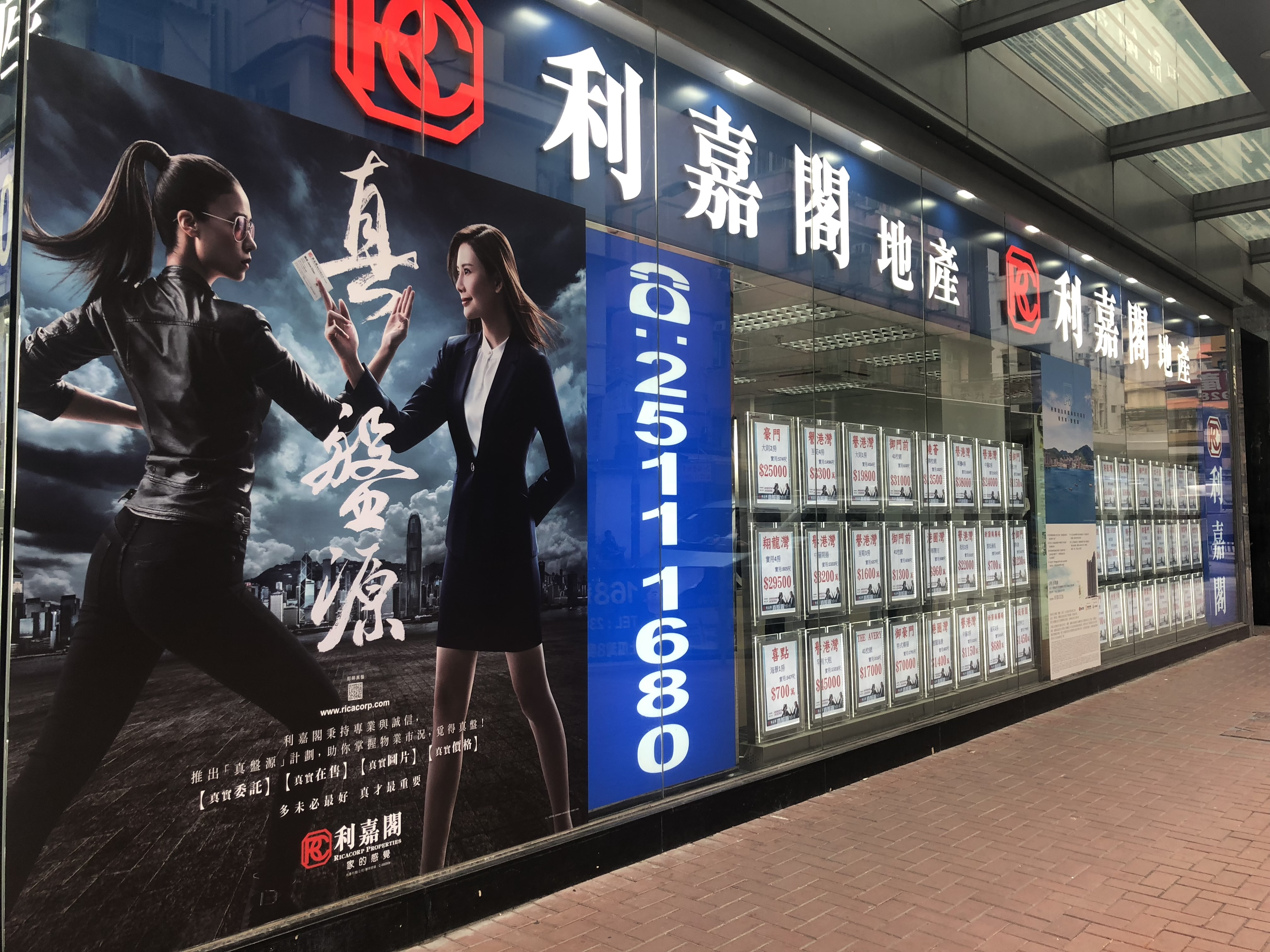
A Ricacorp branch

Ricacorp Properties Limited is one of the largest real estate agency companies in Hong Kong, providing residential, industrial, commercial, retail and car-parking spaces property agency services. Meanwhile, it also offers immigration consultation, surveying, auction and mortgage referral services for all types of properties. As of the end of 2018, the company has more than 220 branches and around 3,000 staff in Hong Kong.

The company initially focused on the residential sector in Hong Kong. To catch up with the rapid development in the property market, Ricacorp branched out to various sectors including commercial, industrial, retail, and overseas market in recent years. In 2005, the company set up Ricacorp (C.I.R) Properties and Ricacorp (Macau) Properties limited. Till 2018, it established Ricacorp (Zhuhai) Properties limited to enter the Greater Bay area market. The Surveyors Department and Ricacorp Overseas Property & Immigration Consultant Limited were also set up to enhance related services in the same year.

Ricacorp was one of the first real estate agencies in Hong Kong to focus on removing fake real estate listings from their sites, which they credited with an increase in market share by 2021. The Competition Commission claimed that Ricacorp was one of three firms who colluded to maintain above-market commission rates, according to 2023 legal filings by the Commission against another of these firms, Midland Holdings.
