= Liber Research Community =

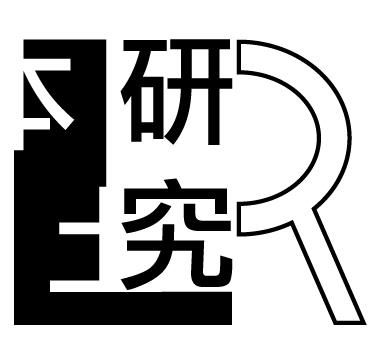
- Formation: 2009
- Type: Non-governmental organization
- Purpose: Land Research
- Location: Hong Kong
- Methods: research, consultancy
- Website: https://www.liber-research.com/

Liber Research Community
- Traditional Chinese: 本土研究社
Transcriptions
Yue: Cantonese
- Yale Romanization: Bún tóu yìhn gau séh
- Jyutping: Bun2 tou2 jin4 gau3 se5

Liber Research Community is a non-governmental organization in Hong Kong that focuses on researching land and development policies.

== History ==
The group was created in 2009 by postgraduates, including Chan Kim-ching, who studied geography and planning.

In 2017, it released a report of about 9,800 houses in the New Territories that were suspected to be involved in the illegal trading of ding rights. In 2020, it found 800 more village houses that were suspected to be illegally traded within the past 2 years.

In 2018, it published a research report stating that the government had underestimated the amount of brownfield sites in the New Territories, with the government estimating 1,300 hectares, and Liber Research Community finding 1,521 hectares. Additionally in 2018, it found that around 300 hectares of government land was underutilized.

In 2019, it released research where HK $9.4 billion of stamp duty was exempted in the past 10 years, when property buyers used companies to buy and sell properties via shares transfers.

In 2021, it determined that nano flats, defined as units below 260 square feet, accounted for 13% of all new units in 2019, and were the result of government policies, including the reduction the amount of windows required in an apartment. SCMP later released an opinion piece based on the research, stating that construction of nano flats should be curbed.

In May 2021, it released a report titled Research Report on Development Potential of Vacant Small House Land, which determined that of a total of 3,380 hectares of village-type land, 1,548.8 hectares were idle and privately owned, with a separate 932.9 hectares of idle land belonging to the government. It determined that of the 1,548.8 hectares of privately owned idle land, 149.1 hectares appeared to be scheduled for illegal development of small houses, where collusion between developers and villagers was likely.

In June 2021, it released Missing Brownfields- Hong Kong Brownfields Report 2021, a collaborative report with Greenpeace East Asia where together, they found a total of 1,950 hectares of brownfield sites, 379 more hectares than the government was previously able to locate.

== Research topics ==
According to its website, it lists 5 primary research areas:

1. Hong Kong Land Research
2. Housing Policy Research
3. Open Government Research
4. Food Safety Research
5. Hong Kong-China Relation Research

== Publications ==
Research Reports
#	Year	Name
1	2013	Myth and Reality: Land Problem in Hong Kong
2	2014	Tyranny of the land leasing: Case Study on the Short-Term Lease Arrangement in Mashipo, Hong Kong
3	2015	No Place for Home: New Perspectives For The Long Term Housing Strategy in Hong Kong
4	2015	Hydroponics in Focus: A Study on Hong Kong’s Emerging Hydroponics Industry
5	2016	Brownfield Sites in Hong Kong 2015: tracing causes, distributions and possible policy framework
6	2017	Leasing for the Few: Exploring Short Term Tenancy Sites by Tycoons in Hong Kong
7	2018	Research report on abuse of small house policy by selling Ding Rights
8	2018	A Study on the Development Potential of Brownfield in the New Territories
9	2018	Your Real Choice: Honest Consultation on Land Supply
10	2018	Tracking the tax dodgers: a study on avoidance of residential property tax by share transfer in Hong Kong
11	2018	Missing Option: Research on Temporary Use and Vacant Government Land in Hong Kong
12	2018	Study on the Ownership of Fish Ponds in North West New Territories
13	2018	Brownfields in Time: Tracing the course of Brownfields expansion in the New Territories
14	2020	Abuse of the Small House Policy: Revisited 2020
15	2021	A decade of compression- Hong Kong nano-flat study 2010-2019
16	2021	Research Report on Development Potential of Vacant Small House Land
17	2021	Missing Brownfields- Hong Kong Brownfields Report 2021

Books
#	Year	Name	ISBN
1	2013	不是土地供應 - 香港土地問題的迷思與真象	978-988-12005-0-1
2	2016	棕跡	978-988-14095-2-2

== See also ==
- Housing in Hong Kong
- Small House Policy
