= Small House Policy =

Housing entitlement programme in Hong Kong

- Traditional Chinese: 小型屋宇政策
Transcriptions
Yue: Cantonese
- Yale Romanization: Síu yìhng ūk yúh jing chaak
- Jyutping: Siu2 jing4 uk1 jyu5 zing3 caak3

The Small House Policy (SHP, Chinese: 小型屋宇政策) was introduced in 1972 in Hong Kong. The objective was to improve the then prevailing low standard of housing in the rural areas of the New Territories. The policy allows an indigenous male villager who is 18 years old, and who is descended through the male line from a resident in 1898 of a recognized village in the New Territories, an entitlement to one concessionary grant during his lifetime to build one house.

The policy has generated debates and calls for amendments to be made.

== History ==
The Small House Policy has been in effect ever since 1972 to provide a once-in-a-lifetime small house grant for an indigenous villager who is "a male person at least 18 years old and is descended through the male line from a resident of 1898 of a recognized village (Ding, 丁) which is approved by the Director of Lands". An indigenous villager therefore enjoys small house concessionary rights (ding rights, 丁權) in building a house of not more than three storeys nor more than 700 square feet per floor (therefore a maximum of 195 square meters, or 2,100 square feet), through a Private Treaty Grant, a Building Licence or an Exchange issued under this policy. These rights were further incorporated into the constitutional framework. It was stipulated in Article 40 of the Basic Law – "The lawful traditional rights and interests of the indigenous inhabitants of the 'New Territories' shall be protected by the Hong Kong Special Administrative Region", making significant amendments to this policy difficult. By 2016, there were approximately 240,000 small house concessionary rights holders in Hong Kong.

The Small House Policy is a legacy of the British colonial government. In order to cater for the needs of an increasing demand for housing and to prevent recurrence of anything similar to the 1967 Hong Kong riots, the outbreak of which was partly due to people's discontent towards the indifferent attitude of the colonial government toward public welfare, threatening the colonial rule, the colonial government was keen on improving the living conditions of Hong Kong dwellers in the 1970s. One of their plans was to develop new towns (新市鎮) in the New Territories, which were later known as Tsuen Wan New Town, Sha Tin New Town, Tuen Mun New Town and so on. As this would require a large-scale confiscation of land and demolition of housing, David Akers-Jones, the then Secretary for the New Territories, implemented the Small House Policy in exchange for the New Territories indigenous groups' support for the new town development. Meanwhile, the government also added some constraints in this policy by including a Restriction on Alienation which required indigenous villagers to pay a premium if they wish to transfer their rights of ownership to non-indigenous villagers within a five-year period.

In 2012, Carrie Lam called for an end to the Small House Policy. In 2015, a developer and 11 villagers in Sha Tin were sentenced to jail for up to three years over the illegal sale of their small houses. The developer secretly made an agreement with the 11 villagers to buy their ding rights; in 2025, the court ruled that the villagers' lawyers were incompetent and overruled the original sentence.

In December 2018, Martin Lee represented Kwok Cheuk-kin and Hendrick Lui Chi-hang in an attempt to repeal the policy. Lee argued that the policy discriminates based on gender and descent, and that the policy was implemented by the British in 1972, and could not have been part of "indigenous" rights that villagers claim to have had in 1898.

In April 2019, the Court of First Instance ruled that two of the three methods for obtaining a small house grant (private treaty grants and exchanges) would become banned. The third method, the free building license, would continue to be legal. The Heung Yee Kuk organization supported the existing Small House Policy, and threatened to ask Beijing for help if an appeal to the April 2019 ruling was not granted. It spent HKD $30M on the first round of judicial review.

As of October 2020, approximately 43,000 small houses had been built in Hong Kong under the policy.

In January 2021, the Court of Appeal ruled against the April 2019 ruling, and said that all three methods for obtaining a small house grant were legal, making private treaty grants and exchanges legal once again. The plaintiffs, Hendrick Lui Chi-hang and Kwok Cheuk-kin, said that they would take the case to the Court of Final Appeal. Justice Jeremy Poon also claimed that Hendrick Lui Chi-hang and Kwok Cheuk-kin did not have sufficient standing to bring up the case because they do not own land rights in the New Territories. In response, a member of the Liber Research Community said that "The ding right affects every Hong Kong citizen as it competes with other land uses for land resources. The government has had to reserve lots of space in new towns for villagers to build their homes, while the land could have been better used for higher-density developments. How can the court say we have no stake in the issue?" Additionally, the Liber Research Community said that due to the reversal of the April 2019 decision, 900 hectares of government land that could have been used for high rise developments would again be re-allocated to villagers and small houses.

Following the decision by the Court of Appeal, the SCMP Editorial Board wrote that the Small House Policy is an unsustainable burden and also unfair and discriminatory. Other SCMP opinion writers, such as Cliff Buddle and Mike Rowse, also criticized the Small House Policy, stating that "The scheme is open to abuse with many recipients no longer living in their New Territories village" and that "Everyone in the administration has known for decades that the policy is impractical and unprincipled."

In March 2021, Apple Daily reported that Woo Kwok-hing's sister, Woo Chiu Ha, was suspected of building illegal structures measuring 2500 square feet at her village house, built with government subsidies under the small house policy.

Also in March 2021, ICAC announced an investigation named "Silver Grass," where 24 people were arrested for the fraudulent selling of ding rights in order to develop and sell property at a profit in Yuen Long. Those who were arrested included Yuen Long district councillor Ching Chan Ming, as well as lawyer Edward Kwong-wing Wong (nicknamed the "Small House King") of the firm Wong and Poon Solicitors, and Edward Wong's second son, Nelson Wai-shun Wong. In March 2022, ICAC charged Edward Wong for defrauding the government over 14 years for the sale of 115 small houses, and Ching for illegally purchasing "ding rights".

In April 2021, an opinion piece on Apple Daily said that after the NPCSC had ensured only "patriots" serve in the government and eliminated opposition, Carrie Lam would be "simply incompetent" if she did not try to end the policy again, as she called for in 2012. Separately in April 2021, three judges in the Court of Appeal endorsed and agreed that the issue should be moved to the Court of Final Appeal, stating that the debate on the policy "is plainly of great general or public importance which ought to be submitted to the Court of Final Appeal."

In June 2021, the Ombudsman, Winnie Chiu, said that unauthorised building works (UBWs) in New Territories Exempted Houses (NTEHs), which includes small houses, were supposed to begin eradication starting in 2012. However, after 9 years, "UBWs in NTEHs remain pervasive, including new works, in-progress ones, and blatant existing unauthorised structures already identified by the Building Department for priority enforcement. As such, I have decided to initiate a direct investigation to examine the enforcement measures undertaken by the BD and the Lands Department and their effectiveness in combating UBWs in NTEHs, and will make recommendations for improvement where necessary."

In October 2021, David Pannick, who was hired by the kuk to defend the policy, said in court that the plaintiff, Kwok Cheuk-kin, was simply a "busybody."

In December 2021, a reporter was attacked in Sheung Sze Wan Village while investigating a house built under the policy.

In August 2024, a 29-year-old villager filed a lawsuit against the government's plans to reclaim some villager land for the Northern Metropolis.

== Assenting views ==
As a local policy formulated against the specific historical context of Hong Kong, the Small House Policy has brought some positive effects on both Hong Kong society and the British Colonial Government (and Chinese Central Government after the transfer of sovereignty over Hong Kong). The impact could be divided into three categories.

For the colonial government, the Small House Policy helped to ease tension between the government and indigenous inhabitants, and facilitated the development of New Territories land. Before the engagement of the colonial government, the indigenous inhabitants held the right to private ownership of the land in the New Territories, with the permanent land contracted conferred by Qing (清朝) and Ming (明朝) government. Through the exchange of "Ding" for ownership, the colonial government lowered the law-enforcement cost in the process of land ownership transformation, and provided opportunities for the current economic development of the New territories. After handover, according to Article 40 of the Basic Law, "the lawful traditional rights and interests of the indigenous inhabitants of the 'New Territories' shall be protected by the Hong Kong Special Administrative Region".

For the indigenous inhabitants of the New Territories, their benefits are substantial. Firstly, the inhabitants enjoy a hereditary privilege of land usage and housing grant, which is a great advantage regarding Hong Kong's population density and land shortages. Secondly, according to Lands Department of Hong Kong, after a five-year period, the villager can freely sell his property in the market without any restriction. After the grant of ownership transfer, the Small House Policy created huge and direct economic interest for the indigenous inhabitants. These benefits help to create a sense of pride and belonging to the indigenous villages which are useful in forging a bond among the indigenous villagers and to preserve their tradition.

Proponents suggest that, for Hong Kong society as a whole, the Small House Policy also brings some benefits. The policy, to a certain extent, guaranteed a sense of land security against environment pollution and over-exploration, and protected the original natural environment of New Territory during the urbanization and industrialization of Hong Kong. Under the Small House Policy and "Village Type Development" project, the villages in New Territories could keep their traditional lifestyle and features until now.

== Opposing views ==
Despite the benefits mentioned here above, the small house policy does create a lot of controversies, which can also be divided into three categories.

First of all, the Small House Policy is fundamentally unsustainable. There was already over 14157 outstanding small house grant applications received until 2002, yet the number of potential applicants, who are eligible indigenous male villagers at least 18, is still increasing. It was estimated that the number of indigenous villagers with entitlements was going to reach 240000. In other words, if all of these 240000 entitled villagers were going to apply for small houses, there would be a significant uptake of over 2,200 hectares of Hong Kong’s valuable land resources. However, there is a dwindling supply of land in village areas to develop small houses. The imbalance of supply of land and demand for small houses will remain a major problem of the Small House Policy.

Secondly, the speculative development develops within the Small House Policy framework is found to have gotten more serious. The Audit Commission in 1987 realized the phenomenon that the indigenous villagers kept selling their small houses to the outsiders. The situation has even been more frequent since 2002. On top of the abusive use of this policy, there are some indigenous villagers who are intentionally recruited by private landowners to sell their rights of ownership. According to Lands Department of Hong Kong, indigenous villagers need to sign up a security document, which is to prevent them from taking full advantages of their title to the lot. Yet, there are a significant number of people make declarations, which are in fact misrepresenting their true intentions. They apply for the removal of restriction on alienation while assigning the small houses to the developers so that they can gain benefits from selling their rights. There is also another form of abuse. Although villagers living overseas are not allowed to apply for a small house, it is in fact difficult to determine if the application was made with a local address. An SCMP author noted that small houses are for villagers' "own occupation," yet some owners live overseas. Additionally, Kenneth Lau said that overseas male descendants of indigenous villagers should have housing privileges even if they are not Hong Kong residents, claiming that "Despite them being overseas, we should not strip them of their rights."

Apart from those controversies regarding the actual exercise of the policy, the nature of the policy is also greatly disputed. The Small House Policy is discriminatory against two groups of people. First of all, the policy was designed to offer male indigenous villagers exclusively a right to apply for small houses. This totally discriminates against the female indigenous villagers, as they are not allowed to apply for a small house grant. Indeed, the nature of The Small House Policy has been criticized since 1995. The United Nations Committee on Economic, Social and Cultural Rights had released a report, mentioning that they were having great concerns about the sexual discrimination that the Small House Policy may potentially involve. The Equal Opportunities Commission had also noticed the case, describing that the policy was actually violating the human right ordinances applied in Hong Kong, i.e. the Hong Kong Bill of Rights Ordinance. More importantly, the policy is not only violating the rights of women but also the non-indigenous Hong Kong residents. It is argued that the principle of equal rights should be or can be applied in Hong Kong; it should protect all the citizens of Hong Kong. Therefore, it is unfair that indigenous villagers enjoy an exclusive right to build houses, especially when Hong Kong is having serious land scarcity.

Not to count that Hong Kong has one of the highest population density, such a policy is unsustainable for a small territory of 1104 sq.km. The policy is seriously against the principle of social equality, for Hong Kong does not have a distinguishable boundary between the urban and rural. Both the indigenous and the non-indigenous people have been enjoying equal rights and sharing same facilities. When the middle classes have been contributing a huge percentage of the government revenue but a big portion of it goes to housing subsidy, which the middle classes are not qualified for, growing discontent from the middle classes is inevitable.

== Land supply problem and suggestion ==
According to Hong Kong Population Projections for 2015 to 2064, the current average annual growth rate of population is 0.8% and Hong Kong population will climb to 7.76 million in mid-2024. Planning Department also pointed out that the population of the Hong Kong Island and Kowloon in 2024 will reach 1.19 million and 2.33 million respectively while the population of the New Territories will increase by 456 600 between 2014 and 2024 and will reach 4.24 million respectively by 2024. This implies that the New Territories, containing the majority of the Hong Kong population, will experience a greater magnitude of population growth.. The significant population growth will lead to a pressing need for housing. Although the total area of Hong Kong is 1105.7 square kilometres, the land planned for residential use in 2015 is only about 77 square kilometres, accounting for 7.0% of the total area. In the face of population pressure, Hong Kong Government has to increase the land supply in order to deal with the rising housing demand in the future.

In a bid to meet the housing needs of Hong Kong citizens, Hong Kong Government has announced the new Long Term Housing Strategy in 2014. For the overall strategy, the government adopts the short, medium and long term measures to increase land supply. With respect to medium and long term measures, they focus on "review and rationalisation of brownfield sites and deserted agricultural land in the New Territories as well as mapping out further development strategy for Lantau and the New Territories North". Nonetheless, a portion of land is zoned "Village Type Development" and the land within this zone is mainly for the development of small houses by indigenous villagers. Nowadays, about 3366 hectares of land in Hong Kong are zoned "Village Type Development" on statutory plans. In 2015-16, about 26 ha of land were newly zoned "Village Type Development". In 2015, 120 cases were approved, amounting to a total area of about 2.53 ha within the 303 pending applications for New Territories Exempted Houses and Small Houses. It is the government policy that the land within "Village Type Development" will not be rezoned for large-scale development such as residential or recreational uses because of their scattered locations and infrastructural restrictions. Aside from that, Hong Kong Government also intends to concentrate village type development within this zone for the sake of "a more orderly development pattern, efficient use of land and provision of infrastructures and services".

In 2006, the former Secretary for Housing, Planning and Lands, Michael Suen Ming-yeung had tried to enlarge the magnitude of development in certain village areas by proposing the multi-storey small house developments so as to provide more residential flats given the limited supply of land for small house development. Nevertheless, the government in 2012 stated that multi-storey developments would create planning and building-control difficulties. Hence, this approach is not an ideal solution to deal with the small house development.

In this day and age, there are rising concerns about land and housing supply in Hong Kong. Most of the urban residents in Hong Kong are dissatisfied with the Small House Policy and there is a call for abolishing this anachronistic and unfair policy in Hong Kong. According to a study conducted by Civic Exchange, more than 60 percent of the respondents supported the proposition that the policy should be changed. On the other hand, the respondents tend to reform the Small House Policy to restrict small house transactions by imposing a permanent moratorium on the resale of small houses to "outsiders", i.e. non-indigenous people or allocating public housing towards villagers as a replacement for small houses or shutting down applications, but to compensate eligible villagers by other alternatives.

=== Tso/tong land ===
According to the Heung Yee Kuk, there are approximately 2,400 hectares of tso/tong land, land which is held in the name of villager clans and families, many of which are underutilized. In May 2021, SCMP noted how difficult it is for tso/tong land to be sold by villagers and bought by developers, as it requires unanimous consent of a villager clan/family, rather than a majority.

== Liber Research Community reports ==
In October 2020, SCMP reported on research done by the Liber Research Community, an NGO. According to a member of Liber, the villagers' development rights and buildings were secretly sold by villagers to developers for profit, illegal under current laws. Some transactions were done using secret contracts and offshore accounts in the British Virgin Islands, making tracing of the deals and information on their developers more difficult to obtain. According to Liber, villagers secretly agree to transfer the house to the developer once construction of the house is complete. In 2017, it released a database of more than 9,800 small houses that it believed were involved in such illegal trading. While updating the database in 2020, it found that 804 more small houses also believed to be involved in illegal trades, bringing the total to 10,581 small houses, representing 25% of all small houses in Hong Kong. The Lands Department in the past 3 years had only referred 183 cases to law enforcement for investigation, representing less than 2% of all suspected illegal trades.

As part of their research, Liber was able to find suspicious houses that were built in groups of at least three, with similar alignment and architecture. These houses appeared more like private estates rather than village houses, and most are enclosed within walls and security guards, implying that the houses were planned together rather than by individual villagers. Additionally, some lots of land were found to have been sold by villagers to companies.

In May 2021, Liber released another report titled Research Report on Development Potential of Vacant Small House Land, which determined that of a total of 3,380 hectares of village-type land, 1,548.8 hectares were idle and privately owned, with a separate 932.9 hectares of idle land belonging to the government. It determined that of the 1,548.8 hectares of privately owned idle land, 149.1 hectares appeared to be scheduled for illegal development of small houses, where collusion between developers and villagers was likely.

== See also ==
- Overheard 3, a film based on abolishing the Small House Policy.
- Housing in Hong Kong
