= List of most expensive houses in Hong Kong =

== By transaction amount ==
Below lists some of the most expensive houses in Hong Kong which have been sold. Houses which have high listing prices but have not yet been sold are not included. Additionally, houses which were bundled together and sold in one transaction are also not included. Selling price is at the time of transaction, and is not adjusted for inflation.

Most expensive houses in Hong Kong
| Rank | Address | Sale Year | Selling Price (HKD) | Square Feet (Saleable) | Square Feet (Gross) | HKD per Square Foot (Gross) | Notes | References |
|---|---|---|---|---|---|---|---|---|
| 1 | 75 Deep Water Bay Road | 2017 | $2,500,000,000 | 13,854 | | $156,000 | Bought by Pan Sutong | |
| 2 | 15 Gough Hill Road | 2016 | $2,100,000,000 | 18.000 | saleable | Bought by Cheng Hongtian This price is not strictly a reference because payment of transaction involved a mainland property, i.e. not ‘all-cash’ Seized by creditors in 2023 | Resold in 2024 for HK$790m or 43,000 / sq. ft. | |
| 3 | 22 Barker Road | 2015 | $1,500,000,000 | | 9,890? | | Price per sq.ft. cannot be confirmed because true saleabale area not known. | |
| 4 | House 3 8 Mount Nicholson Road | 2017 | $1,164,000,000 | | 9,178? | $126,813 | Moun Nicholson is not on the Peak but Mid-levels East, between Jardine's Lookout and Wong Nai Chung Gap. | |
| 5 | 1 Gough Hill Road | 2025 | $1,088,000,000 | 11,451 | | $95,018 | Unknown buyer | |
| 6 | House 1 8 Mount Nicholson Road | 2016 | $1,080,000,000 | | 9,950 | $108,543 | Mount Nicholson is not on the Peak, but Mid-levels East. | |
| 7 | 28 Peak Road | 2024 | $1,050,000,000 | | | | Sold by the family of Ho Shung-pun to Zhansheng Network Technology | |
| 8 | 2 Headland Road | 2016 | $1,020,000,000 | 11,937 | | | Bought by Nicholas Chu. HK$85,448 per saleable square foot | |
| 9 | House 15 8 Mount Nicholson Road | 2019 | $916,000,000 | 5,778 | | | Mount Nicholson is not the Peak but between Jardine's Lookout and Wong Nai Chung Gap. | |
| 10 | House 3 28 Gough Hill Road | 2018 | $900,000,000 | | 5,579 | $161,319 | Bought by Pansy Ho | |
| 11 | | 2023 | $900,000,000 | 7,111 | | | | |
| 12 | House 7 15 Shouson Road | 2022 | $870,000,000 | 8,032 | | $108,347 | | |
| 13 | | 2023 | $860,000,000 | 4,470 | | | | |
| 14 | 20 Perkins Road, Jardine's Lookout | 2020 | $850,000,000 | 5,353 | | $ 160,000 | | |
| 15 | 25-26 A&B Lugard Road | 2024 | $838,000,000 | | | $71,703 | | |
| 16 | House 6 8 Mount Nicholson Road | 2016 | $830,000,000 | | 9,455 | $87,784 | Mount Nicholson is not on the Peak. | |
| 17 | 6 Henderson Road, Jardine's Lookout | 2020 | $830,000,000 | 7,993 | | $110,000 | | |
| 18 | 35 South Bay Road | 2014 | $808,000,000 | | | | 7,294 sqft on 18,800 sqft plot. Bought by Salata Jean Eric | |
| 19 | Skyhigh House A 10 Pollock's Path | 2011 | $800,000,000 | 5,876 | 8,302 | $96,362 | Built by Ryoden Development and Stephen Chow | |
| 20 | 81 Perkins Road, Jardine's Lookout | 2019 | $800,000,000 | 5,540 | | $150,000 | Bought by Hopson Dev's chairman | |
| 21 | | 2018 | $780,000,000 | | 7,984 | | | |
| 22 | | | | | | | | |
| 23 | | 2018 | | | | | | Centadata |
| 24 | House 16 8 Mount Nicholson Road | 2018 | $721,880,000 | 5,019 | 7,987 | $90,484 | Mount Nicholson is in Mid-levels East | |
| 25 | House 6 28 Barker Road | 2015 | $698,000,000 | 5,286 | | | | Centadata |
| 26 | House 7 28 Barker Road | 2014 | $690,000,000 | 5,273 | 6,847 | | Bought by Qian Fenglei | |
| 27 | House 1 11 Plantation Road | 2018 | $690,000,000 | 8,609 | | | | |
| 28 | House 1 Twelve Peaks 12 Mount Kellett Road | 2018 | $666,520,000 | 4,858 | | $137,201 | | |
| 29 | House 6 23-39 Blue Pool Road | 2020 | $660,000,000 | 4,581 | | | | |
| 30 | 3 Gough Hill Road | 2013 | $650,000,000 | | 5,145 | $126,336 | Sold by Peter Law Kin Sang | |
| 31 | House 16D 8 Mount Nicholson Road | 2021 | $639,796,000 | 4,544 | | | Included 3 parking spots. $140,800 per net sq ft | |
| 32 | | 2018 | $620,500,000 | | 4,784 | | | |
| 33 | House 19 8 Mount Nicholson Road | 2017 | $620,000,000 | | 7,981 | $77,685 | | |
| 34 | House 2 11 Plantation Road | 2018 | $620,000,000 | 7,941 | | | | |
| 35 | Tower 1, Flat 1B 8 Deep Water Bay Drive | 2019 | $605,440,000 | 7,568 | | $80,000 | | |
| 36 | 77B 77-79 Peak Road | 2021 | $600,880,000 | 5,149 | | | | |
| 37 | | 2017 | | | 4,579? | | | |
| 38 | 77A 77-79 Peak Road | 2021 | $598,000,000 | 5,926 | | | | |
| 39 | House 11D 8 Mount Nicholson Road | 2018 | $590,190,000 | | 4,596 | $128,414 | | |
| 40 | House 15C 8 Mount Nicholson Road | 2022 | $583,200,000 | 4,230 | | | | |
| 41 | | 2019 | $580,890,000 | 4,678 | | | | |
| 42 | 8 Pollock's Path | 2011 | $580,000,000 | | 11,222 | $51,684 | | |
| 43 | | 2021 | $560,920,000 | 4,186 | | | | |
| 44 | | 2017 | $560,000,000 | | 4,242? | | | |
| 45 | 77F 77-79 Peak Road | 2021 | | 4,621 | | | | |
| 46 | | 2021 | | 5,208 | | | | |
| 47 | House 5 11 Plantation Road | 2018 | $550,000,000 | 6,815 | | | | |
| 48 | | 2018 | | | 4,266 | | | |
| 49 | House 5 28 Barker Road | 2015 | $542,000,000 | 4,270 | | | | Centadata |
| 50 | | 2019 | $538,900,000 | 4,061 | | | | |
| 51 | House 3 28 Barker Road | 2013 | $538,000,000 | 4,274 | 5,706 | | Owned by Vivien Chan | |
| 52 | Tower D, 10/F 8 Mount Nicholson Road | 2020 | $533,140,000 | 4,517 | | | | |
| 53 | House 2 28 Barker Road | 2014 | $530,000,000 | 4,226 | | | | Centadata |
| 54 | House 3 11 Plantation Road | 2018 | $530,000,000 | 6,600 | | | | |
| 55 | House 5 28 Barker Road | 2020 | $530,000,000 | 4,270 | | | | |
| 56 | Tower D, 9/F 8 Mount Nicholson Road | 2020 | $528,540,000 | 4,517 | | | Mount Nicholson is near Jardine's Lookout | |
| 57 | TBD Unit 39 Conduit Road | 2017 | $522,000,000 | | | $105,000 | TBD Unit | |
| 58 | No. 12 90 Repulse Bay Road | 2019 | $520,000,000 | 6,068 | | | | |
| 59 | Tower D, 8/F 8 Mount Nicholson Road | 2018 | $519,990,000 | 4,517 | | | | |
| 60 | House 6 11 Plantation Road | 2018 | $510,000,000 | 6,372 | | | | |
| 61 | House 6 11 Plantation Road | 2018 | $510,000,000 | 6,372 | | | | |
| 62 | No. 3 90 Repulse Bay Road | 2019 | $503,880,000 | 5,851 | | | | |
| 63 | House 1 28 Barker Road | 2015 | $500,000,000 | 3,990 | | | | Centadata |

== By valuation ==
Below are the top 10 most expensive houses in Hong Kong. Prices (valuation) are based on best estimates in 2023. Factors determining prices include location, view, built quality, past transactions, media reports and annual figures published by Rating and Valuation Department of the Government. Rankings are based on per square foot. Note other houses under the table with values close to ones within the top 10 list.

| Rank | Address | Price/valuation | Square Feet (approx. saleable) | HKD per Square Foot | Notes | References |
|---|---|---|---|---|---|---|
| 1 | 2 Goldsmith Road, Jardine's Lookout 渣甸山高士美道 | HK$2.5b | 10,000 | 250,000 | Joseph Lau Luen-hung's residence 270-degree harbour view | |
| 2 | 75 Deep Water Bay Road 深水灣道 | HK$3.3b | 13,800 | 240,000 | Sold by Pu Sutong in 2021 for HK$3.3b Ocean, golf course view | |
| 3 | 1 Peak Road 山頂道 | HK$2.1b | 9,000 | 230,000 | Sold by Jin Yong in 1996 for HK$1.96m who bought in 1985 for HK$ 12.5m Above Wan Chai Gap | |
| 4 | 25 Cooper Road, Jardine's Lookout 渣甸山谷柏道 | HK$2.2b | 10,000 | 220,000 | Bought by Stanley Ho in 1972 for HK$1.75m Designed by architect Joseph Fung Harbour view/over HK Stadium | |
| 5 | 79 Deep Water Bay Road 深水灣道 | HK$ 2b | 9,000 | 220,000 | Li Ka-shing's residence Ocean, golf course view | |
| 6 | 37 Deep Water Bay Road 深水灣道 | HK$1.76b | 8,000 | 220,000 | Bought by Cannong Fok in 2007 for HK$ 350m Developed by National Properties Designed by architect Joseph Fung | |
| 7 | | | | | | |
| 8 | 1 Repulse Bay Road 淺水灣道 | HK$2.3b | 11,000 | 210,000 | Bought by Stanley Ho in 1966 for HK$700,000 Near Deep Water Bay/Wan Chai Gap | |
| 9 | 89 Repulse Bay Road 淺水灣道 | HK$3.6b | 18,000 | 200,000 | Residence of C-Bons' founder Ranked no.1 by Ratings Dept. in 2018 | |
| 10 | 13 Big Wave Road Shek O* 大浪灣道 | HK$3.6b | 20,000 | 180,000 | Pony Ma's residence | |
| N/A | 35 Barker Road 山頂白加道 | | | | This has 3 separate houses and cannot be classified as one house. | |
| N/A | 12 Repulse Bay Road 淺水灣道 | over HK$ 5b | 25,000 | 200,000 | Owned by New World's Cheng family (To be re-developed) | |
