= South East Asian and Hong Kong property markets =

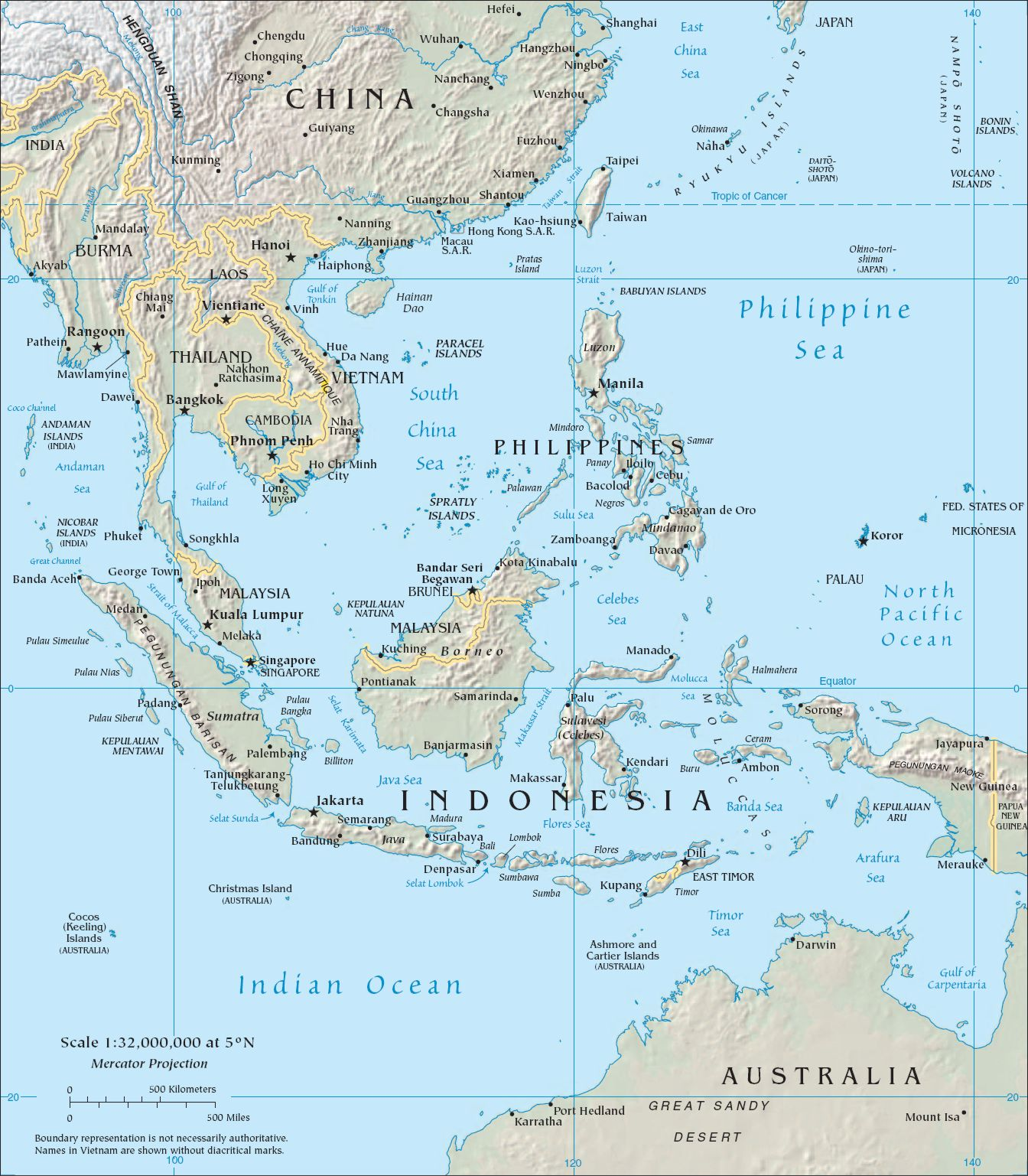
Map of Southeast Asia

Ever since the 1997 Asian financial crisis, property markets have greatly developed through the years. Asian governments have improved the financial stance associated with the structure of housing finance, allowing more access to a diverse range of mortgages products.

Housing in Asia has an important role in economic growth. In the early 1990s large urbanization in Hong Kong, Singapore, Thailand, Philippines and other Southeast Asia countries brought about a large housing price appreciation. Asia attracted global economic interest up until the economic crash of 1997. A decade later, the Asian economy has been stabilized, and has allowed the property market to advance. As a result, foreign investment is continuing to grow. The market is currently experiencing a 50% increase in the amount being invested into Asian countries globally. Although some countries in Asia may not be suitable for international investment, due to government manipulated GDP figures and overvalued realestate fueled by unsustainably high debt to income ratios.

== Hong Kong ==
Hong Kong has one of the most developed mortgage market in Asia. Mortgage loans account for 25-30% of bank loans in Hong Kong. Land ownership and land restrictions by the government risk inefficiencies with housing supply and demand. In 1998 there was a property price collapse; from 1997 to 2003 Hong Kong residential property prices fell by 61% following the Asian economic crisis. Investigations show that there is a distinct correlation between lending and property prices and that the influence is thought to have come from the property prices to the bank credit rather than the other direction. Hong Kong is known for having one of the most expensive real estate sector in the world, in both commercial and residential space. As property value increase, the tendency with Hong Kong property owners is to leave property vacant whilst waiting for a better time to sell it on. This subsequently raises the vacancy rate. (For example, in 2007, the vacancy rate for residential properties in Hong Kong was close to 2.5% with an 11% increase in the value of residential properties).

== Singapore ==
Due to the nature of the country, the majority of property is in the public sector accounting for 85% of the total households. In the 1990s, the government had schemes to encourages development of private housing, which was successful as private housing share increased rapidly. In 2007, Singapore’s residential property market boomed due to strong economic growth and an influx of professional migrants to Singapore, which particularly boosted the financial service industry. The demand for Singapore office space is driven by the tight supply issue in the Singapore property market and the expanding financial facilities available to service private wealth in Asia. (For example, in 2008, according to the Singapore Land Authority the availability of Singapore residential property was tight with only 4,457 new units are under construction or planned for 2008 to 2013).

== Indonesia ==
Property development news has been mainly focused in Jakarta, the nation’s capital. In the 1970s, Jakarta's governor Lieutenant General Ali Sadikin focused on rehabilitating public services and re-housing. The government were able to provide low cost housing for residents in the low income bracket as well as providing subsidised loans for low cost housing through state owned mortgage banks. Jakarta became the focus of a real estate boom in the late 1980s, however suffered during the Asian financial crisis, to which the city majorly suffered from. However, the market has slowly rejuvenated. Within the residential sector, there is an ever increasing trend of investment into new builds. Many of the ongoing projects are middle-lower and middle-upper class (dominating the market at 73% in 2008). New builds are located in the north of the city. The demand has been increasing as worsening traffic into Jakarta has influenced commuters decisions to move closer to the workplace, many of the new apartment towers are located adjacent to business centers.

== Thailand ==
The property market in Thailand, first boomed in the 1980s, this was thanks to a well performing economy, that attracted many people into property investment. A few years later the government encouraged commercial banks to sell their mortgage services and products. Thailand suffered great economic losses during the Asian economic crisis and the market did not regain again until 2000, were the property market saw US$2 billion being invested into Thai property. Property investment prices in Thailand are considerably low compared to other southeast Asian locations, attracting foreign investors, many of which for tourism. For the nationals of Thailand, there are currently commercial banks and government housing banks are dominant in the mortgage lending services with a commercial share of 80-90%. The surge has been observed and analyst believe that Thailand's property market may well be in its infancy. However, in recent years and throughout 2010 there was speculation centered on a potential Thailand condo bubble. Yet Thai authorities claim there is still no sufficient evidence of a property bubble forming in Thailand. Since the Condominium Act of 1979 revised in 2008, it is possible for foreign investors to own a property in a condominium. It greatly boosted foreign investment and stimulated Thailand's real estate market. Recent data shows strong market affinity from Chinese buyers, especially in Chiang Mai, Bangkok and Phuket with China-based property portal Juwai.com estimating a 10% growth in Thailand real estate enquiries for 2019, while good exchange rates plus an upwardly-trending influx of Russian tourists has experts cautioning property developers not to overlook the Russian market.

== Philippines ==
The Philippines was arguably the worst affected by the 1997 Asian financial crisis, with the biggest drop in property market, and has not yet managed to recover fully to this day. Despite this, with a predicted GPD growth of 7.4% in 2007, the Philippines' economy is strongly growing in both Manila and Cebu City. A growing trend in the economy in 2004 resulted in a small property boom, where all office space, luxury residential and retail markets are still on the rise. This is surprising as Philippines is still perceived as an un-desirable place to do business in Asia although there are plenty of professionals coming into the country and joining the expatriate community. Economic growth is heavily reliant on private consumption and investment. There are 8 million overseas nationals who continue to invest into property in the Philippines, but growth may be vulnerable due to the recent 10% depreciation of the US dollar against the Peso. Manila's CBD (Central Business District), Makati, is the most expensive district in the city for office space. On the contrary, Manila still remains to be one of the cheapest places in Asia to buy luxury residential property. A recent surge in supply for this will trouble the market and previous investors within the next few years.
