= Greenpeace East Asia =

Non-governmental organization

- Founded: 1997, Hong Kong
- Type: Non-governmental organization
- Purpose: Environmentalism, peace
- Location: Beijing, Hong Kong, Taipei, Seoul, Tokyo
- Region served: People's Republic of China, Hong Kong, Taiwan, South Korea, Japan
- Method: campaigning, lobbying, research, consultancy
- Key people: Pang Cheung Sze (Executive Director)
- Website: www.greenpeace.org/eastasia/

Greenpeace East Asia is an office serving the East Asia region of the global environmental organization Greenpeace.

== History ==
Greenpeace East Asia's first China office was opened in Hong Kong in 1997. Early actions included a blockade of a shipment of electronic waste from Australia and a campaign highlighting the dangers of PVC in children's toys.

Before offices were formally opened in Guangzhou and Beijing in 2002, activists from the Hong Kong office ran several campaigns in mainland China. These included investigations into electronic waste dumping in Guangdong province and a campaign to stop US-headquartered biotechnology firm Monsanto Company from patenting a Chinese indigenous soy bean variety.

Early mainland-based campaigns focused on food and agriculture and electronic waste. Since then Greenpeace East Asia has broadened its mandate into efforts to urge China's wood products industry to import environmentally sound timber, clean up its polluted rivers and lakes, and highlight the urgency of stopping climate change.

== Campaigns ==
Greenpeace East Asia runs five main campaigns: climate and energy, food and agriculture, toxics (water pollution), forests and a campaign on air pollution. The organisation uses non-violent direct action to draw attention to what it considers significant threats to the environment and also lobbies for solutions. It emphasizes that while "surging economic development in East Asia has brought widespread prosperity, [it] has also taken a severe environmental toll, both regionally and worldwide."

The website also lists several achievements including:

- In 1998, following a Greenpeace campaign, Hong Kong banned the import and re-export of hazardous waste.
- In 2006, Greenpeace East Asia was the only NGO to be consulted on an early draft of a renewable energy law by China's National People's Congress.
- Two Greenpeace expeditions to China's Himalayan region in 2006 and 2007 produced evidence of dramatic glacial retreat.
- On July 6, 2010 Greenpeace China took action against Asia Pulp & Paper and French supermarket chain Auchan, which carries APP paper products such as Breeze (清风 Qingfeng) tissue paper. Activists, dressed as the Sumatran tiger buried themselves under packages of Breeze toilet paper rolls while forest campaigner Ma Lichao spoke to the media about the issues. Although critical of its forestry practices in the past, Greenpeace is now working with APP to monitor its sustainability strategy including the implementation of its Forest Conservation Policy.

Currently one of Greenpeace East Asia's key campaigns is to encourage China to reduce its reliance on coal as a power source and to speed up the development of the renewable energy sector instead.

Apart from specific campaigns, they also work with local organisations from time to time for general advocacy, including with the Geography Society of PLK Vicwood KT Chong Sixth Form College between 2008 and 2009.

== Research reports ==
In June 2021, it released Missing Brownfields- Hong Kong Brownfields Report 2021, a collaborative report with Liber Research Community where together, they found a total of 1,950 hectares of brownfield sites, 379 more hectares than the government was previously able to locate.

== See also ==
- Greenpeace
- Environmental issues in China
- Agriculture in China
- Geography of China
- Energy in China
- Renewable energy in China
- Coal power in China
