= Costliest cities in the world =

Cities with the highest cost of living

According to the Worldwide Cost of Living 2020 report issued by the Economist Intelligence Unit (EIU), Singapore, Hong Kong, and Osaka share the title of costliest city in the world. The list was prepared based on their Worldwide Cost of Living (WCOL) Index scores. The Worldwide Cost of Living survey was done in order to compare the cost of living indices in cities all over the world.

== Methodology ==
The list has been created based on the Worldwide Cost of Living data set. The data set comprises 400 individual prices of 160 products and services across 130 cities in 90 countries. Data set was created covering a wide range of products including food and beverage to household supplies, personal care items to clothing. Services includes home rents to transport, utility bills and private schools to domestic help. The prices of commodities are gathered from three types of stores: supermarket, medium-priced retailers and more expensive specialty shops. Only those outlets were considered where the quality of the products are comparable to international standards. The prices of the services like house rents, transportation charges depends on several factors such as personal preferences and variety of choices. Therefore, the prices of these services are based on actual prices noted by the researchers. The prices were compared considering the New York as base city and all the prices were US dollars with the appropriate exchange rates at the time of survey

== The top 10 costliest cities in September 2021 ==
City	Country/Region	WCOL index (New York=100)	Rank
Tel Aviv	Israel	106	1
Paris	France	104	2
Singapore	Singapore	104	3
Zürich	Switzerland	103	4
Hong Kong	Hong Kong	101	5
New York	US	100	5
Geneva	Switzerland	99	7
Copenhagen	Denmark	97	9
Los Angeles	US	96	10
Osaka	Japan	96	11

== Price comparison for 10 years until 2020 ==
The price of 1kg loaf of bread [All prices are in USD]

City	Singapore	Hong Kong	Osaka	New York	Paris	Zürich	Tel Aviv	Los Angeles	Tokyo	Geneva
Current	$3.35	$3.60	$5.63	$8.62	$5.20	$4.69	$4.70	$6.82	$7.41	$5.62
Last year	$3.40	$3.91	$5.20	$8.33	$5.66	$4.78	$5.09	$6.26	$7.12	$6.06
5 years	$3.54	$4.31	$5.77	$8.62	$5.66	$5.96	$4.94	$6.02	$6.88	$7.48
10 years	$2.88	$4.48	$6.78	$6.85	$9.23	$5.48	$3.49	$5.57	$8.75	$5.22
