= Midland Holdings =

Midland Holdings Limited 美聯集團有限公司
- Company type: listed company
- Industry: Real estate agent
- Founded: 1973
- Founder: Mr. Freddie Wong Kin Yip
- Headquarters: Hong Kong
- Area served: Mainland China, Hong Kong, Macau
- Key people: Chairman: Mr. Freddie Wong Kin Yip
- Website: Midland Holdings Limited

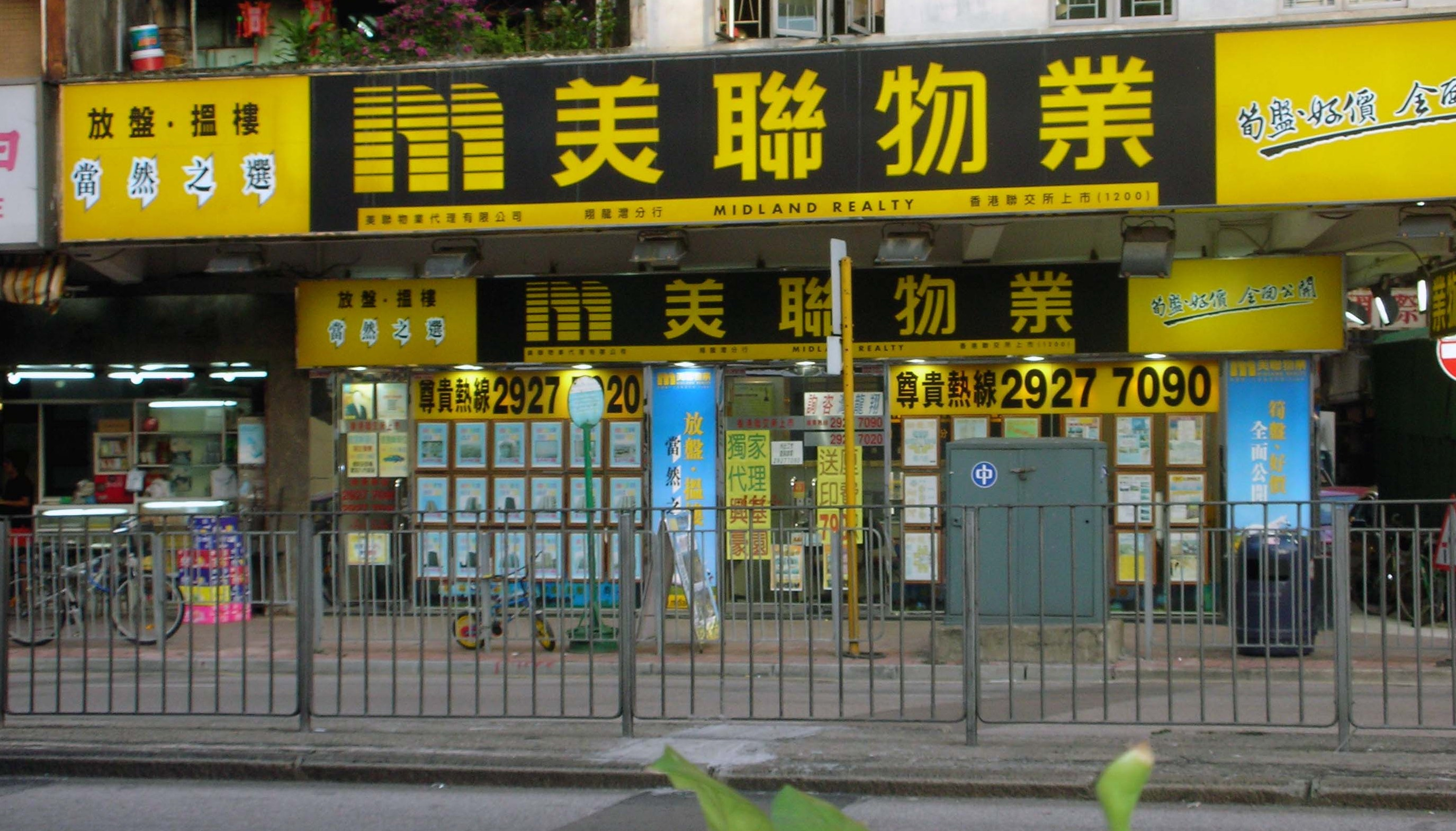
A Midland branch in To Kwa Wan, Kowloon, Hong Kong

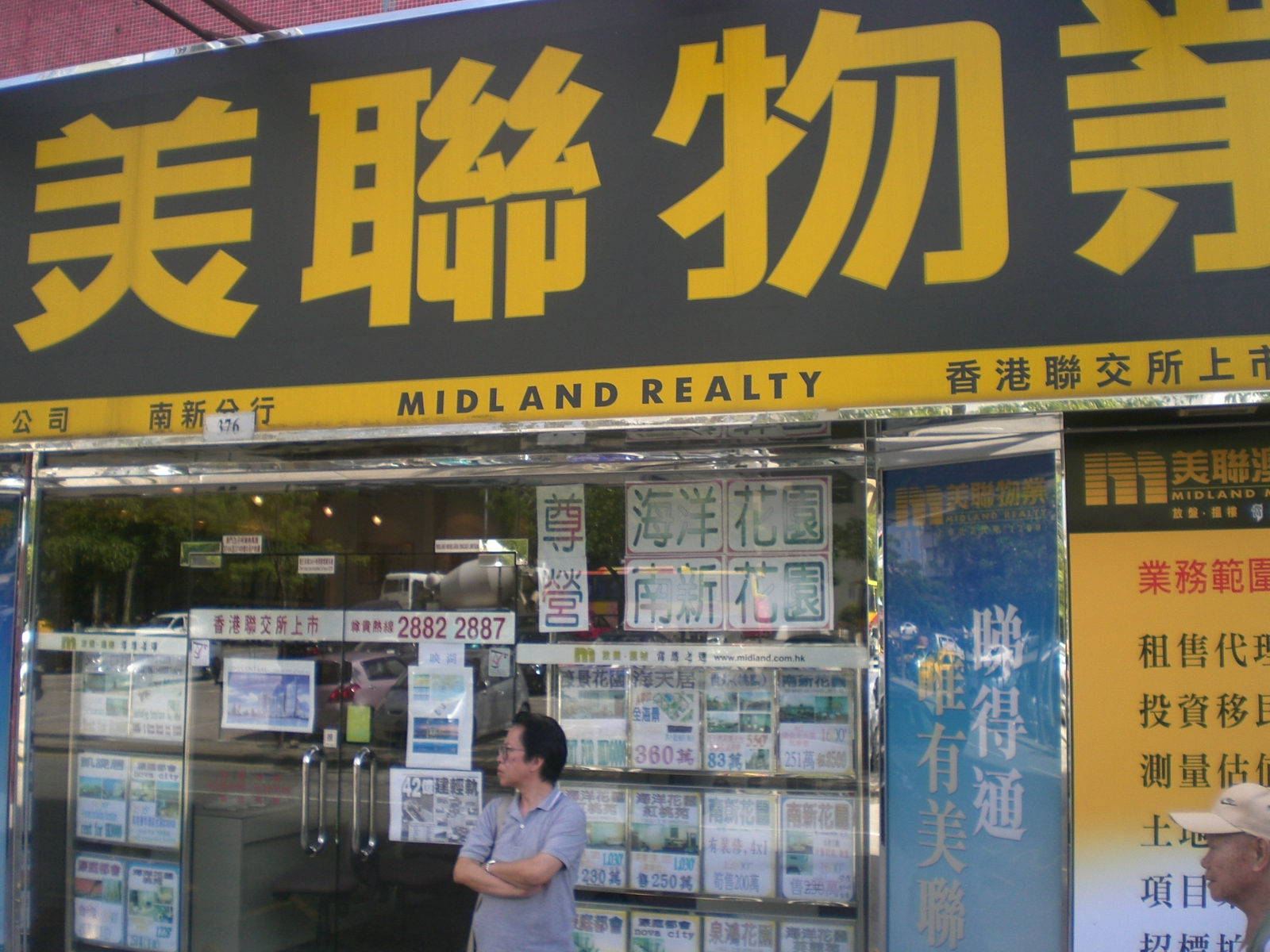
A Midland branch in Taipa, Macau

Midland Holdings Limited (SEHK: 1200) is one of the largest real estate brokerage companies in Hong Kong. It provides residential, industrial and commercial property brokerage services in Hong Kong, Macau and the People's Republic of China.

The company was established in 1973 by Mr. Freddie Wong Kin Yip and started as a small real estate agency in Mei Foo Sun Chuen, Kowloon. It was listed on Hong Kong Stock Exchange in 1995.

Its main competitor in Hong Kong and Macau is Centaline Holdings.

== Corporate Development ==
In December 2018, it was reported that Freddie Wong had offered to buy 57.44 million shares of Midland Holdings from qualified shareholders at a market premium of 28% over recent closing price, making the effective offer price at HKD 2.00 per share. This could increase his and his connected parties' shareholding of the company from 27% to 35%.

== Disputes ==
In the 2014 June annual general meeting of the company, the management team was questioned by the company's second largest shareholder, Apex Benchmark on over payment of remuneration to directors of the company. Apex Benchmark held 10.54% of company shares while Freddie Wong and family held 27.89%. Thereafter, Midland Holdings had requested law enforcement agency to investigate into Apex Benchmark about its bad mouthing the company.

In August 2014, the deputy chairman of Midland Holdings, Angela Wong had said that the company would sue its shareholder Apex Benchmark for damaging the company's reputation.
