= Single-room occupancy =

Type of low-cost housing

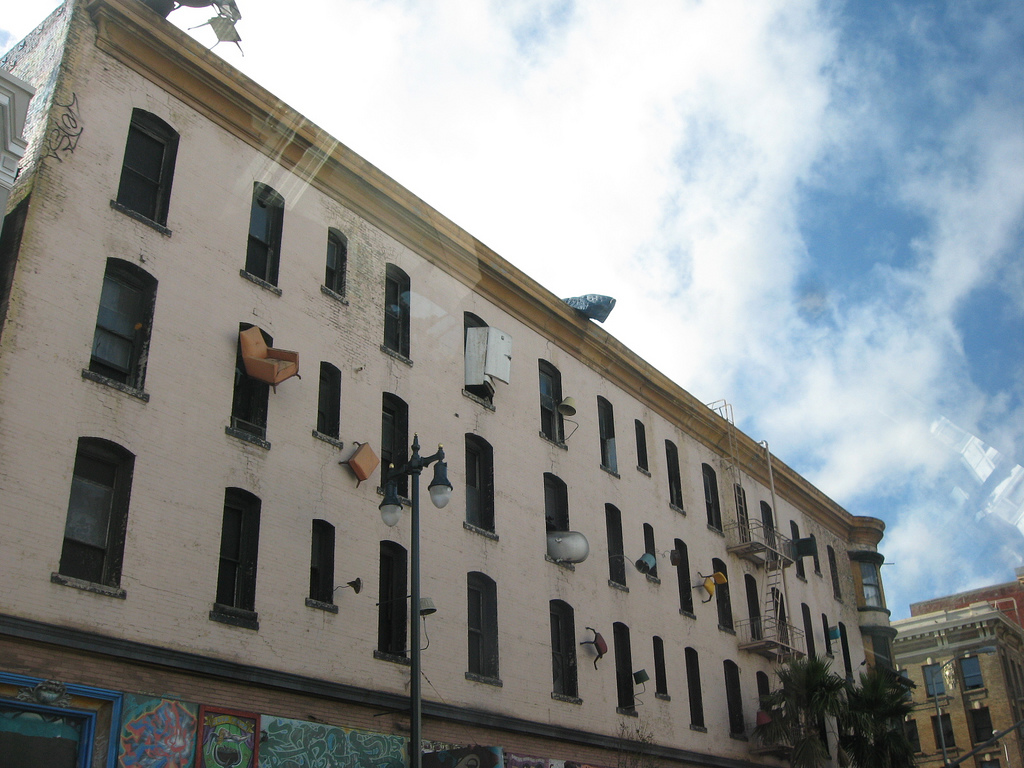
An abandoned single-room hotel (Hugo Hotel) at 6th and Howard in San Francisco, California

Single-room occupancy (SRO) is a type of low-cost housing typically aimed at residents with low or minimal incomes, or single adults who like a minimalist lifestyle, who rent small, furnished single rooms with a bed, chair, and sometimes a small desk. SRO units are rented out as permanent or primary residence to individual occupants within a multi-tenant building in which tenants typically share a kitchen, and may share toilets or bathrooms. SRO units range from 7 to 13 square metres (80 to 140 ft^{2}). In some instances, contemporary units may have a small refrigerator, microwave, or sink.

SROs are a form of affordable housing, in some cases for formerly or otherwise homeless individuals. SRO units are the least expensive form of non-subsidized rental housing, with median rents even in New York City ranging from $450 to $705 per month in 2013. The term is primarily used in Canada and US. Since the 1970s and 1980s, there has been an increasing displacement of SRO units aimed at low-income earners in a process of gentrification, with SRO facilities being sold and turned into condominiums. Between 1955 and 2013, almost one million SRO units were eliminated in the US by regulation, conversion or demolition.

The term SRO refers to the fact that the tenant rents a single room, as opposed to a full flat (apartment). While roommates informally sharing an apartment may also have a bedroom and share a bathroom and kitchen, an SRO tenant leases the SRO unit individually. SRO units may be provided in a rooming house, apartment building, or in illegal conversions of private homes into many small SRO rooms. There is a variety of levels of quality, ranging from a "cubicle with a wire mesh ceiling", at the lowest end, to small hotel rooms or small studio apartments without bathrooms, at the higher end. They may also be referred to as "SRO hotels", which acknowledges that many of the buildings are old hotels that are in a poor state of repair and maintenance. The initialism SRO has also been stated to mean "single resident only". The terms "residential hotel" or "efficiency unit" are also used to refer to some SROs.

== History ==
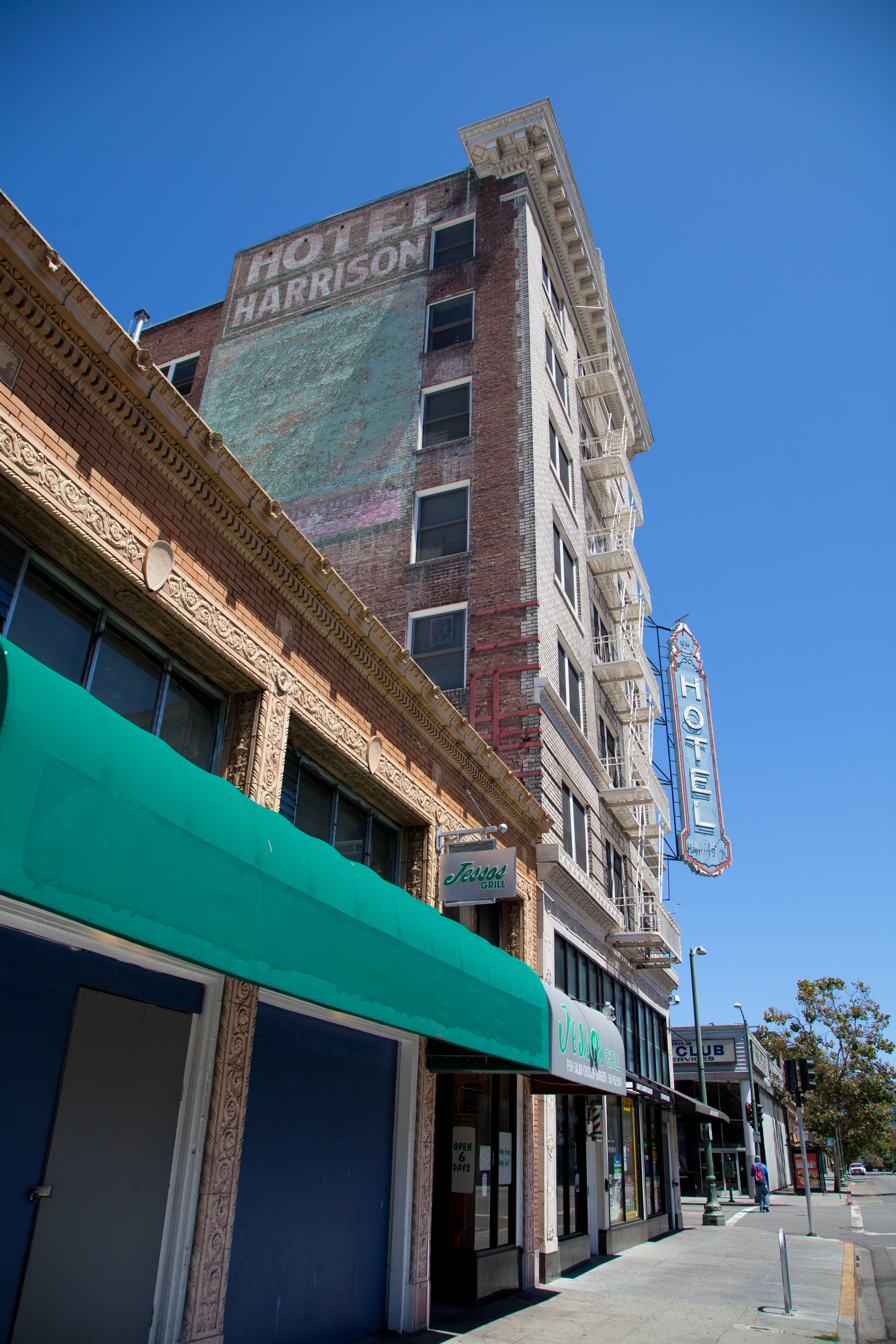
The Harrison Hotel, an SRO hotel in Oakland, California

The term originated in New York City, probably in the 1930s (the Oxford English Dictionary provides an earliest citation of 1941), but such accommodations predate the nickname by at least fifty years. SROs exist in many American cities, and are most common in larger cities. In many cases, the buildings themselves were formerly hotels in or near a city's central business district, typically built in the late 19th and early 20th centuries. Theodore Dreiser described early SRO hotels in his 1900 "naturist novel of urban life" Sister Carrie.

By the 1880s, urban reformers began working on modernizing cities; their efforts to create "uniformity within areas, less mixture of social classes, maximum privacy for each family, much lower density for many activities, buildings set back from the street, and a permanently built order" all meant that SRO hotels had to be cut back. By the 1890s, SRO hotels became "forbidden housing; their residents, forbidden citizens." New York City police inspector Thomas Byrnes stated that rather than give SRO hotels "palliative" care, they should be dealt with using a "knife, the blister, the amputating instruments."

Reformers used moral codes, building codes, fire codes, zoning, planning committees and inspections to limit or remove SRO hotels. An example of moral critiques is Simon Lubin's claims that "unregulated hotels" were "spreading venereal diseases among the soldiers". Other reformers tried to ban men and boys from rooming in the same hotels, due to concerns about homosexuality. The building and safety codes criticized SRO hotel problems such as "firetraps, dark rooms, inadequate plumbing, an insufficient ventilation." In San Francisco, building code inspections and restrictions were often used to racially harass Chinese laborers and the places they lived.

In 1917, California passed a new hotel act that prevented the building of new hotels with small cubicle rooms. In addition to banning or restricting SRO hotels, land use reformers also passed zoning rules that indirectly reduced SROs: banning mixed residential and commercial use in neighbourhoods, an approach which meant that any remaining SRO hotel's residents would find it hard to eat at a local cafe or walk to a nearby corner grocery to buy food. Non-residential uses such as religious institutions (churches) and professional offices (doctors, lawyers) were still permitted under these new zoning rules, but working-class people (plumbers, mechanics) were not allowed to operate businesses such as garages or plumbing businesses.

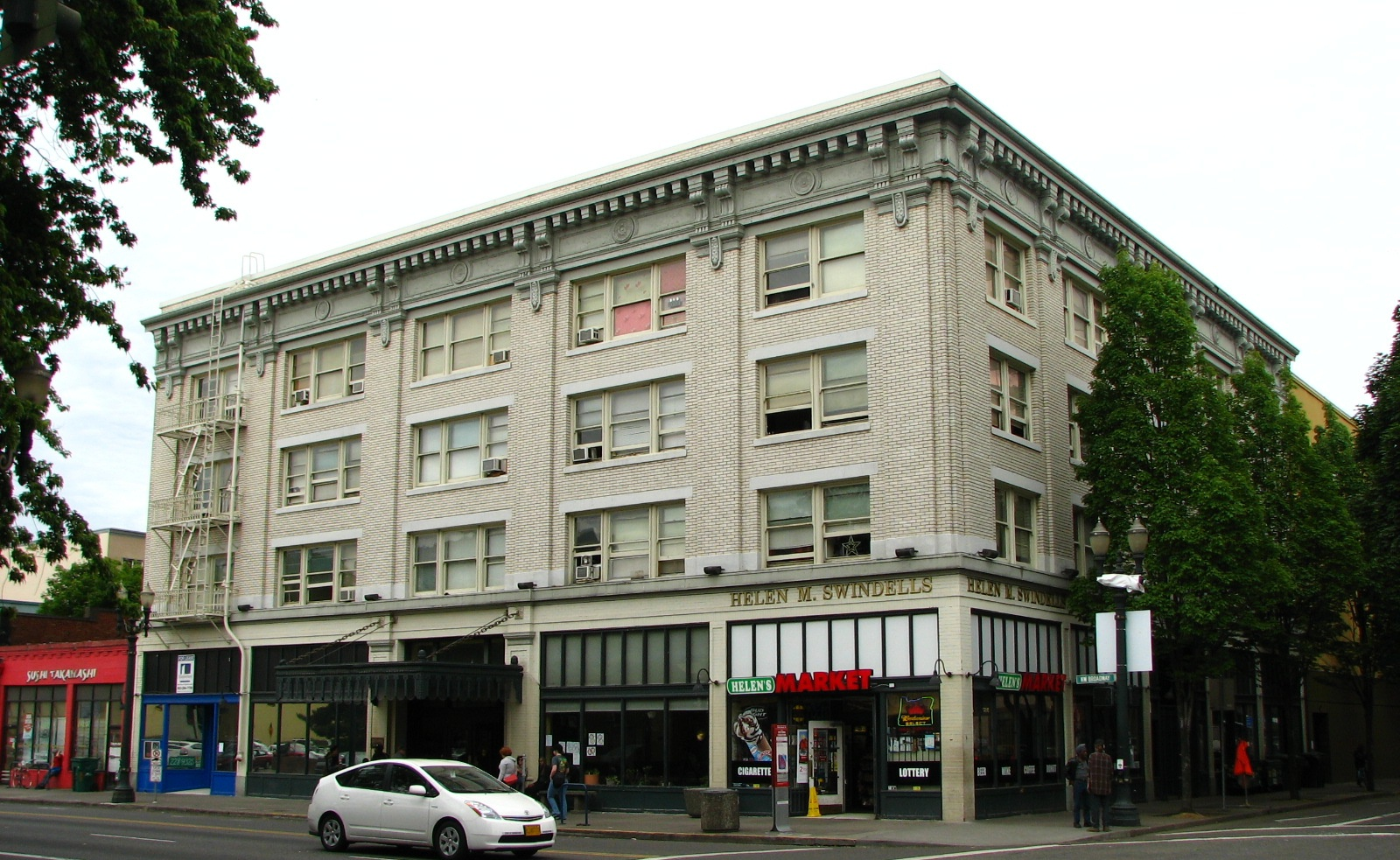
The Broadway Hotel, in Portland, Oregon, was built in 1913. It was turned into an SRO hotel.

The United States saw a decrease in single-room occupancy housing during the period of 1960s and 1970s urban decay. For example, in Chicago 81% of the SRO housing stock disappeared between 1960 and 1980. Since the early 1970s, the supply of SRO spaces did not meet the demand in US cities. In 1970, newspapers in the US wrote about an "SRO [supply] crisis". Downtown SRO hotels offer few and possibly no rooms to rent to tourists. Indeed, since the end of WWII, the inexpensive hotels that became SROs were lost and not replaced, with the losses coming from conversion to office space, demolition, or upgrading to tourist rental. For example, in San Francisco from 1975 and 1980, 6,085 SRO rooms were lost; in Chicago, from 1973 and 1984, more than 23,000 SRO units were lost. Some viewed the removal of SRO hotels as a good thing, as it meant the "removal of substandard housing and unwanted neighbors" and their "public nuisance"; on the other hand, it was also viewed as causing more homelessness.

Paul Groth states that some downtown "residents literally cannot exist without them [SROs]" as they have "[f]ew, if any, housing alternatives." There are "myths about today's [SRO] hotel residents", claiming that they are all "isolated, needy, and disabled; all elderly; all on welfare; all elderly men; or all welfare mothers with three young children...[,] socially marginal, all mildly psychotic, all alcoholics or drug addicts, all drifters and transients", with some journalists using the derogatory term "welfare hotel". A 1985 study in Chicago revealed "a large minority of impoverished workers". In New York City, about one third of SRO dwellers are black and one quarter are Hispanic. Most SRO residents do not move more often than apartment renters, contrary to media references to "transients".

In the mid-1990s, many "city health officials, architects, city planners, and politicians still argue that no one should live in [SRO] hotels", which are viewed as leading to "severe social and physical maladjustment" and "public nuisance". Apart from media criticism, SRO residents are typically "unseen" and "invisible" in housing reform policies and reforms. SRO residents are typically not referred to explicitly in legislation, considered by city housing communities and urban development efforts, which means that SRO residents often have to move from district to district according to changes in real estate planning. San Francisco architect John Liu called SRO hotels the "most controversial, the most neglected, and the least understood of all housing types." The invisibility of SRO residents is caused by a lack of interest in the lives of the poor and in their lack of a "political constituency", as most housing policy focuses on the family. With the huge reductions in the number of SRO rooms available to the lowest-income populations in the US, the role of SROs is being taken over by homeless shelters; however, many homeless people avoid staying at shelters because they find them to be "dangerous and unappealing" or because they do not meet entry requirements (due to being intoxicated), leading to more people sleeping on the streets.

SRO hotels may be invisible to higher-income passers-by when they are discreetly located on the upper floors of a restaurant or retail store. There is a debate as to whether SRO hotel residents are "homeless". Paul Groth states that SRO residents are "not homeless. They are living in admittedly minimal and unusual dwelling units, often in hideous repair and under woefully inadequate management but dwelling units nonetheless." SROs were considered socially acceptable even as late as the late 1950s: the Alfred Hitchcock movie Vertigo depicted young administrative staff living in downtown SRO hotels. An equivalent term to SRO is "residential hotel".

=== YMCA ===
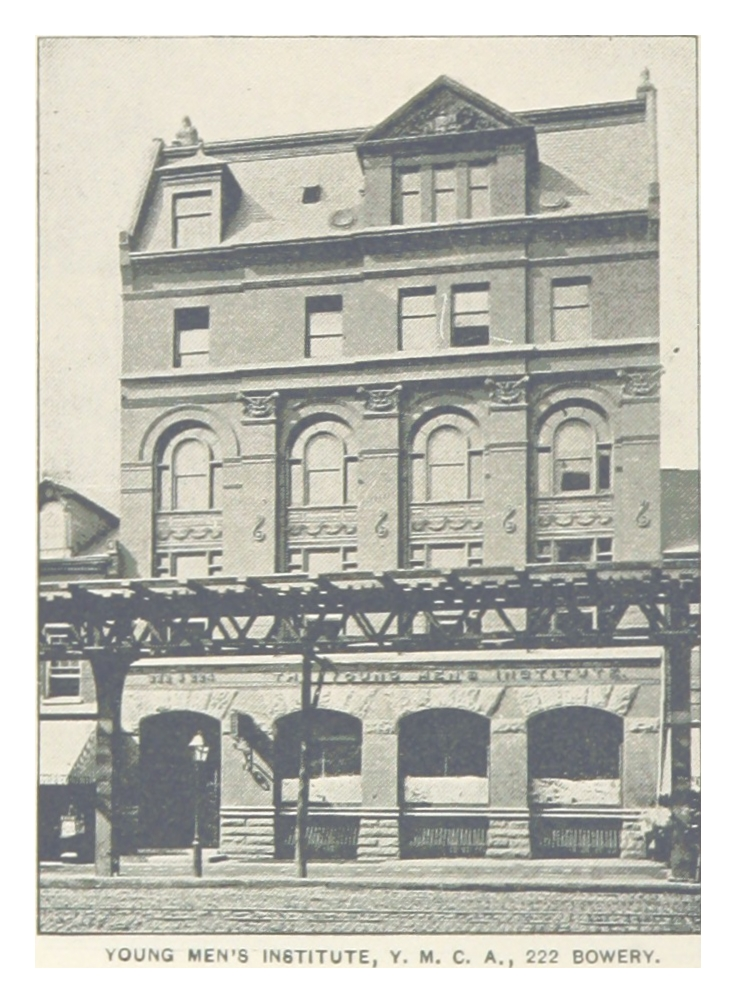
The Bowery YMCA in Manhattan in 1893

In the US, the YMCA began building SRO facilities in the 1880s to house people from rural areas who moved into cities to look for work. The typical YMCA SRO housing provides "low-income, temporary housing for a rent of $110 per week (in 2005)" for stays that are typically three to six months long. By 1950, 670 of the 1,688 YMCAs in the US provided SRO spaces, which made 66,959 beds available. By the 1970s, typical YMCA tenants were more likely to be homeless people and youths facing life issues than people migrating from rural areas.

The pop song and gay anthem "YMCA" by the Village People describes the YMCA's mix of "gay culture and working-class workouts coexisting in a single communal space", creating "a mix of white-collar and blue-collar residents, along with retired seniors and veterans", with about half of residents being gay. While the song gives the impression that YMCA SROs in the 1970s had a party atmosphere, Paul Groth states that YMCA SRO units actually had "more supervision of your social life—a kind of management as to how you behaved ... [than] in a commercial rooming house, which mostly wanted to make sure the rooms were rented", without monitoring who you brought to your room. While some YMCAs hired professionals to help homeless people and troubled youths (e.g., addictions counselors, social workers, etc.), overall, by the 2000s (decade), most YMCAs decided to move away from providing SROs. By 2004, only 81 of the 2,594 YMCAs still had SRO units.

== United States ==
=== New York City ===
For much of New York City's early history, housing was provided in shared accommodations that would probably be described as SROs today. These units provided housing for single, low-income men, and to a lesser degree, single low-income women. In New York City, the number of SRO units increased a great deal during the Great Depression, but with the deinstitutionalization of mentally ill people, SRO units became filled with tenants with mental health diagnoses, which led to bans on the building of new SRO units in the 1950s and taxation benefits for landlords to convert SROs into regular apartments.

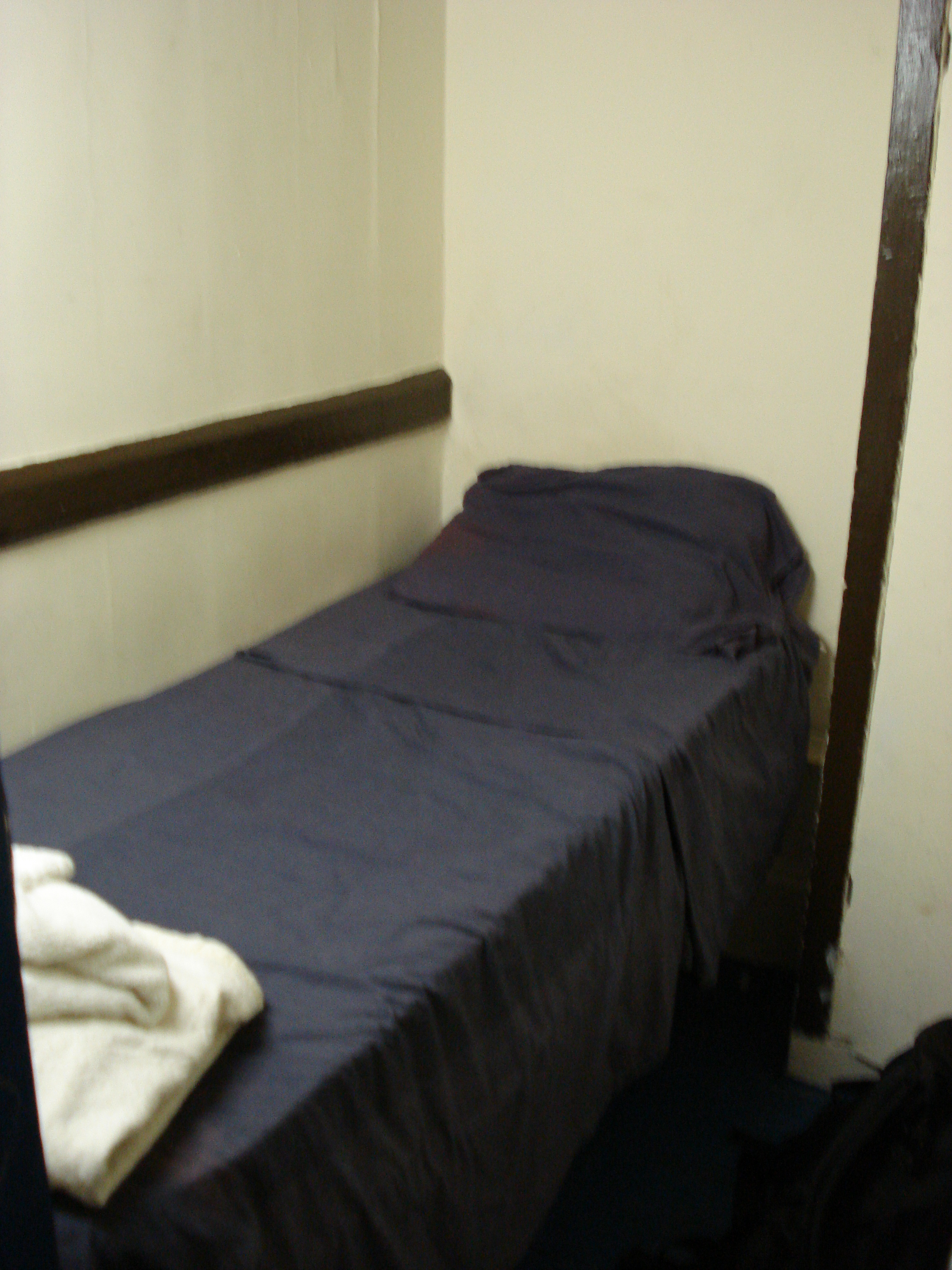
A small room at the Whitehouse Hotel in New York City

In the late 1940s, tens of thousands of Puerto Rican families moved to the Upper West Side; in response to this new demand for housing, landlords harassed tenants of rent-controlled apartments to get them to leave and turned apartments into multi-room SROs, in some cases almost tripling their rental income for the same apartment building. Housing aimed at Puerto Ricans rose in price in response to the demand, while landlords reduced their maintenance. As the numbers of Puerto Ricans increased, overcrowding developed and bodegas and Hispanic-oriented stores opened; the elderly white middle-income residents became "hysterical on the subject of crime and safety", with community meetings held to deal with the issue of "foreigners" and "low types".

The anti-SRO policies of 1955 were introduced when the demographics of SRO residents changed towards immigrant families; in an environment influenced by "varying degrees of xenophobia and racism", the city took steps to ban new SRO unit construction, prevent families from living in SROs, and change building codes and zoning to discourage SROs. In the 1970s, the city introduced tax incentives for landlords to encourage them to convert SROs into regular apartments, a program which from 1976 to 1981 eliminated two thirds of the SRO stock in the city.

While the city realized by the 1980s that SRO units needed to be preserved, due to their role in housing homeless people, and introduced policies to encourage SRO retention, the number of SRO units had fallen by one half (from its Depression-era highest number). In 1985, the city tried to stop the loss of the remaining SRO units by banning the "conversion, alteration, or demolition" of SRO buildings, but by 1989, this law was struck down by an appeals court. The huge loss of SRO units in New York City is "not the inevitable result" of "market forces"; it was caused by an interaction between city housing policies and market forces.

==== Current status ====
Paul Tyrrell states that when New York City housing prices rose in the early 2000s (decade), SRO landlords tried to remove longtime SRO tenants to free up their real estate for more lucrative uses (one of these being Airbnb-style short-term rental). The owners of the Ace Hotel, a former SRO facility, converted their building to a luxury hotel, with only a few long-term, low-income SRO tenants using their leases to stay in the hotel. There are about 100,000 illegal SRO units in New York City, many of which are "unsafe, with too many people" for the space and a lack of proper fire exits and ventilation. Some landlords who wish to convert their old SRO hotel into a luxury boutique hotel may harass the renters or bribe the low-income tenants so they will leave. New York City law requires building owners to receive a certificate of no harassment (CONH) in order to demolish or convert their building to prove they were not intentionally forcing tenants out through harassment or bribery. NYC residents of illegal SROs are reluctant to complain to housing authorities about the condition of their units or rent regulation violations, as doing so could lead to their eviction.

With the increasing popularity of Airbnb, an online room- and house-renting service, housing activists were concerned that the availability of SRO units would decrease, as landlords may find they can make more money from renting the rooms to tourists. In March 2016, affordable housing advocates in New York City were pleased when a judge ruled that an Upper West Side SRO facility (the Imperial Court Hotel) could not rent out rooms for less than 30 days, a short-term tenure that would favour tourist rentals over lower-income long-term renters.

In New York City, some public figures have been recommending that SRO's should be made available legally again, due to great increases in rental prices citywide. Rose Haggerty, an activist for affordable housing, has been seeking to develop new affordable housing, as described below:

In late 2023, Governor Kathy Hochul announced that millions would be spent on restoring SRO units for active housing. During the same period, Mayor Eric Adams announced sweeping new programs to provide affordable housing.

=== San Francisco ===
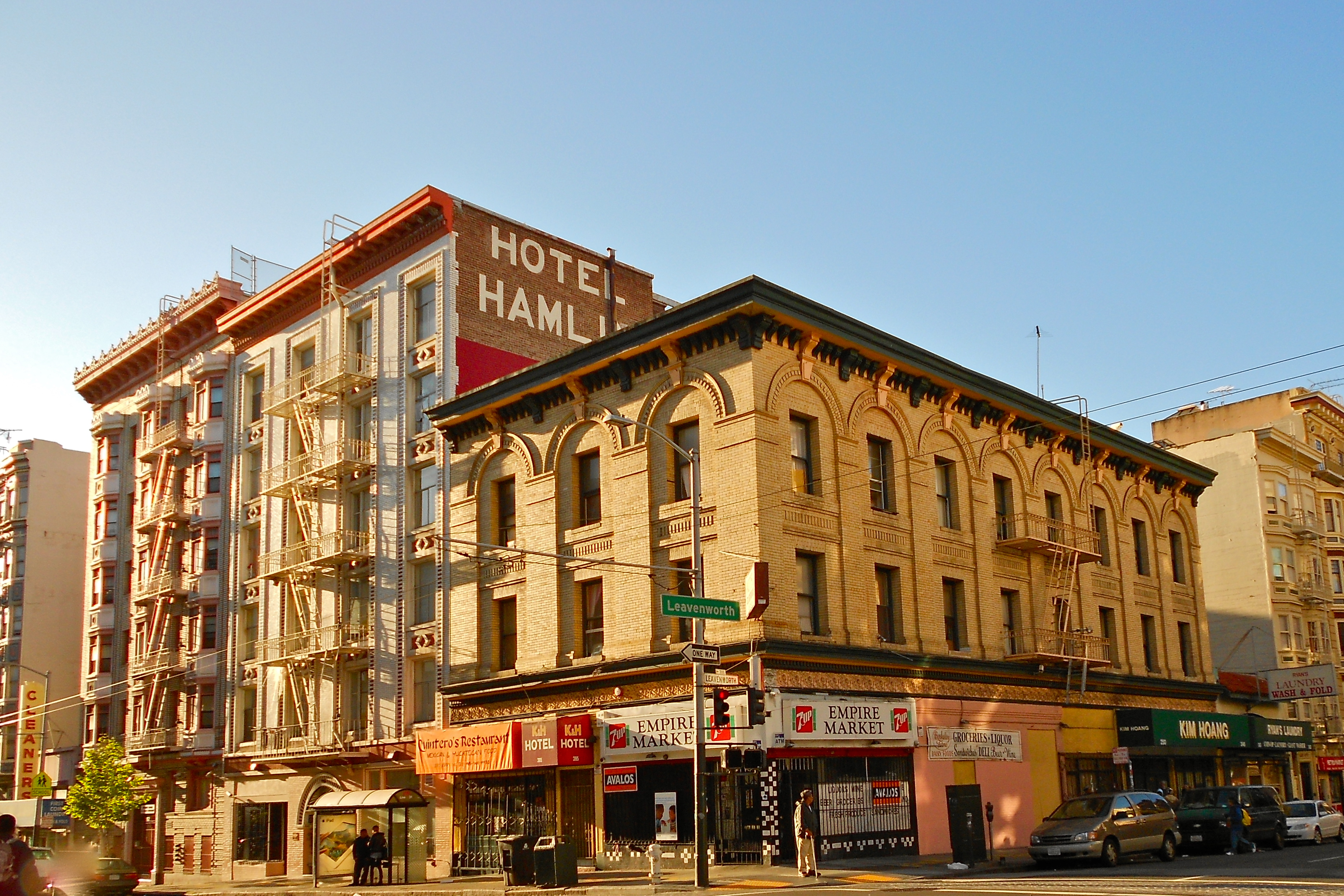
The Hamlin Hotel, an SRO hotel in San Francisco's Tenderloin district

In the middle of the 19th century, gold prospectors, sailors, and seasonal fruit and vegetable pickers lived in San Francisco's SRO hotels during the winter. SROs played a key role in providing housing for immigrant single adults and families, particularly those from China, Philippines, Japan and Latino countries; the SRO district was nicknamed "hotel city" due to the number of SRO hotels. By the late 1940s, the San Francisco Redevelopment Agency began working on "blight removal" and demolition, with thousands of SRO units destroyed to make way for redevelopment.

In 1966, pro-development members of the community formed the San Francisco Planning and Urban Renewal Association (SPUR) to lobby for the removal of poor, immigrant and minority SRO tenants: SPUR stated that "If San Francisco decides to compete effectively with other cities for new "clean" industries and new corporate power, its population will move closer to standard white Anglo-Saxon Protestant characteristics", and thus the association called for exerting "influence" over the city's population to achieve SPUR's goals of improving the "health of the city". In 1968, when a demolition permit was sought for the International Hotel, an SRO hotel inhabited by Filipino seniors, activists and protesters fought to stop it from being destroyed. Although community groups tried to stop the demolition with activism and court action, by 1977, the tenants were ordered evicted; protesters formed a human chain to stop the demolition, but police removed them and the building was razed.

During the 1970s, as San Francisco became a popular and economically successful city, job seekers came seeking homes; Justin Herman, the executive director of the San Francisco Redevelopment Agency criticized the presence of SROs, saying "This land is too valuable to permit poor people to park on it". By 1980, the hotel and convention industries were lobbying for the building of new hotels for tourists; tenant activists protested what they viewed as the "Manhattanization" of the city, including the gentrification and impacts on traffic and air cleanliness. From 1975 to 2000, landlords eliminated about 6,085 SRO units. From 1989 to 2002, more than 1,700 SRO units were destroyed by fires. Even in the 2000s, immigrants live three or four tenants per SRO room.

San Francisco is an example of a city that took over particularly squalid SROs, and renovated them for the disadvantaged. Landlords who intend to convert SROs may try to convince their tenants to sign releases, which may require relocation by the landlord and/or compensating the tenant. The United States Department of Housing and Urban Development subsidizes SRO rehabilitation to combat homelessness, under the McKinney–Vento Homeless Assistance Act of 1987. San Francisco passed an SRO Hotel Conversion Ordinance in 1980, which restricts the conversion of SRO hotels to tourist use. SROs are prominent in the Tenderloin, Mission District and Chinatown communities.

In 2001, San Francisco Supervisor Chris Daly sponsored legislation making it illegal for SRO landlords to charge "visitor fees"—a practice long run in order for hotel managers to get a "cut" on drug-dealing or prostitution activities in the building. After a rash of fires destroyed many SROs in San Francisco and left nearly one thousand tenants homeless, a new program to reduce fire risk in SRO hotels was initiated. In 2015, there were reports that San Francisco's Hotel EPIK would turn the New Pacific Hotel, a former SRO hotel, into a luxury boutique hotel. A 1980 city ordinance prohibits SRO landlords from renting SRO units to tourists for short term stays (which will result in a fine unless the landlord creates a replacement SRO unit).

Jerry Threet, San Francisco' deputy city attorney, says that SROs are "often the last barrier between SF’s poorest population and the streets". Threet says some SRO owners do the "bare minimum to maintain their buildings", leading to unsafe SRO units. In 2014, City Attorney Dennis Herrera sued the owners and managers of 15 San Francisco SROs for "pervasive violations of state and local laws intended to protect residents’ health, safety and tenancy rights". Herrera alleges that the SROs harass or otherwise push out SRO tenants before they can get 30 days tenancy, which gives them protection, an action nicknamed "musical rooms". He also alleges that the SROs either do not do repairs of their units, or do repairs without permits and without licensed, qualified contractors.

In 2016, The Guardian reported that the average SRO rents in San Francisco's Chinatown are increasing from $610 in 2013, to $970 in 2015 (the average rent for all rental housing was $3,907). The increase in SRO rents is due to the shift away from renting to Chinese immigrants towards "college graduates, single adults and white people". In 2016, about 60% of San Francisco's supportive housing tenants lived in SRO hotels. Newspaper reporters found "chronic maintenance issues, health code violations and frustrated residents" at some of these SRO hotels, typically built a century ago, including the Crosby Hotel in Tenderloin, which had "vermin infestations", no power, leaking pipes, and an elevator that was unreliable. Following numerous complaints, the owners of the Crosby Hotel spent $700,000 to repair and upgrade the building. The problems in the city's old SRO hotels are "old buildings with aging infrastructure filled with traumatized or dysfunctional people who sometimes can be destructive or neglectful through hoarding, attracting vermin or willfully damaging property". The Henry, another SRO hotel, is also being improved, with staff giving it new paint, an atrium area, WiFi and computers.

A 2018 article states that some SRO landlords in San Francisco are "holding [SRO] rooms empty, perhaps for years, driving up the value of a building" rather than rent them to low-income people; Erik Schmitt states that one in seven SRO rooms in the city are vacant, with some hotels having 100% vacancy.

=== Seattle ===
The arrival of Asian immigrants to the Seattle area in the 1880s, many living in crowded rooming houses, led to concerns from the city council, which passed a cubic air ordinance in 1886 requiring 500 cubic feet of air space per resident. By the early 1900s (decade), Asian immigrants from Japan and China who settled in Seattle were typically the men from the family, who moved to the city's Chinatown and Nihonmachi districts and lived in SROs. Chinese immigrants came to Seattle to work as miners, cooks, railway laborers and cannery workers. These SRO residents used the restaurants, bath-houses, and barbershops to meet their living needs while they worked in Seattle-area industries. Some SROs aimed at Asian residents had a bath-house in the basement to serve Japanese immigrant clients.

One SRO in Seattle's Chinatown that housed immigrant workers, the West Kong Yick hotel, was closed in the 1970s when it could not afford to comply with Seattle fire and building code updates; it was still closed in 2018. By 1980, only 77 of Seattle's original 350 residential hotels were still standing, due to demolitions. In the 1990s, several of the big SRO hotels were renovated, including the Milwaukee, the Northern Pacific, and the Eastern; however, the fire, safety, and earthquake code upgrades led to big rental increases (for example, the Publix Hotel rental went from $75 per week for a SRO in the early 2000s to $1,350 per month for a micro-studio in 2018).

From 2009 to 2014, Seattle had a big increase in the building and creation of new SRO units designed to be rented at market rates, which had an average monthly rent of $660; In 2013, for example, 1,800 SRO units and microapartment units were built. In 2018, the media depicted the increasing popularity of micro apartments as a new trend; however, an article about Seattle in Market Urbanism Report states this is a "reenactment of the way U.S. cities have long worked", as individuals seeking "solo living and centralized locations" are willing to accept smaller apartments even though the per-square-foot prices may be higher than some larger units. The report states that 2018-era micro apartments were known as SROs in the early 20th century, and they housed "rich and poor alike" (although the rich lived in live-in luxury hotels and the poor lived in "bunkhouses for day laborers"). Neighborhood groups in Seattle have criticized new micro apartment SRO units, arguing that they "harmed community character and provided ... inhumane living conditions; due to these concerns, the city passed regulations that outlawed micro apartment/SRO construction.

== Canada ==
In Canada, SRO hotels (also known as "residential hotels") are most often seen in Vancouver. (In other major cities such as Toronto, rooming houses in converted single-family dwellings are the equivalent form of affordable housing available.) SROs in Vancouver may be either privately owned and for-profit, privately owned and non-profit, or owned by government. As of 2019, there were a total of 156 SRO hotels in Vancouver. Most are occupied primarily (though not exclusively) by people struggling with mental health and/or addiction issues, and who are likelier than average to have experienced homelessness. Tenants typically have their own private rooms, but share washroom and kitchen facilities with other tenants. Rooms generally cost between $375 and $800 (CAD, c. 2015), well below the average cost of Vancouver rental housing.

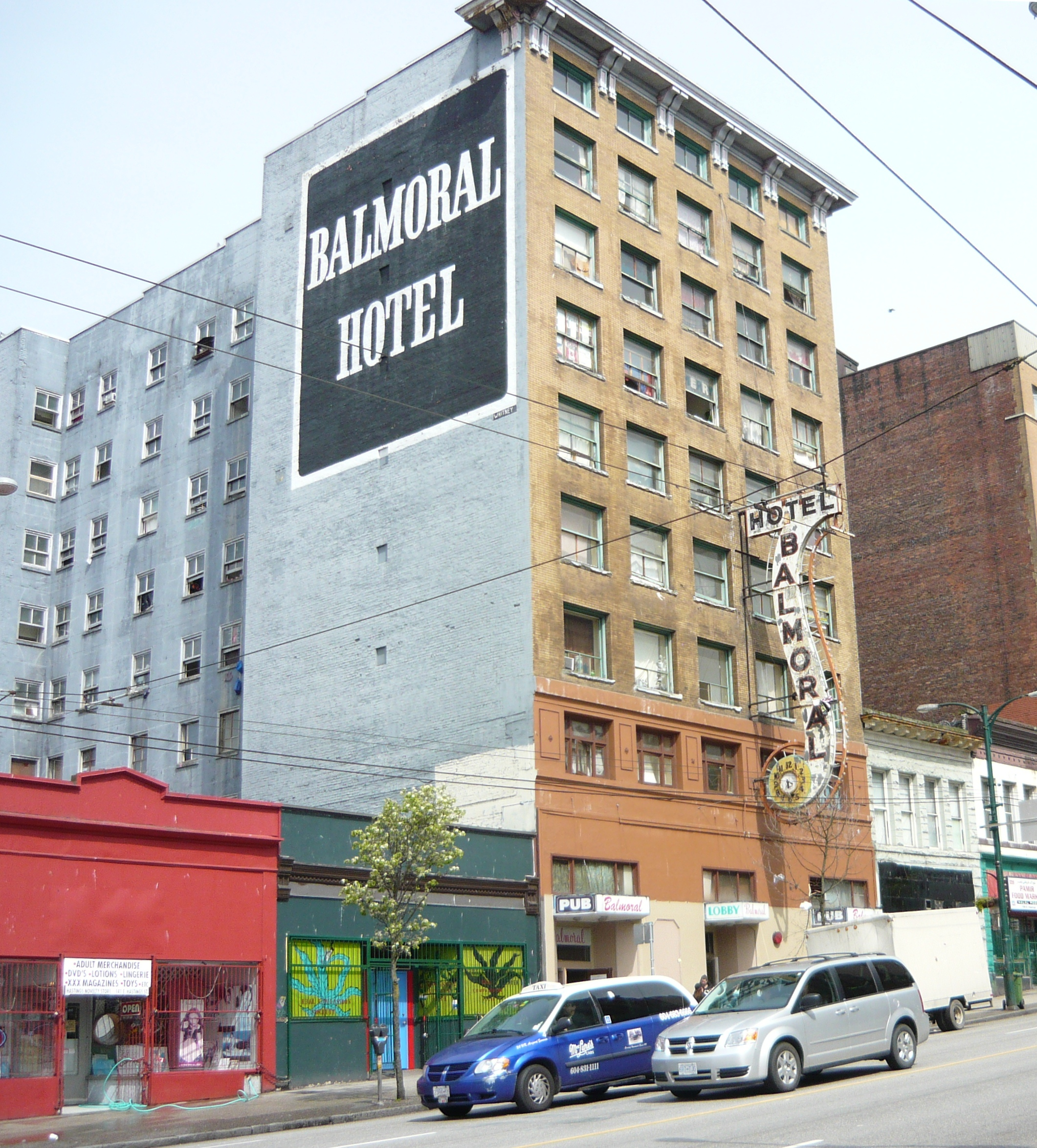
The exterior of the Balmoral Hotel in Vancouver. The iconic sign was removed in June 2022.

Most SROs were originally intended to be short-term accommodations for seasonal male workers, as well as young families, and recent immigrants, in the early 1900s. Two hotels which would later become notorious, the Balmoral and the Regent, were even considered luxury accommodations. However, first the Depression and then the 1970s closure of psychiatric hospitals (and attendant lack of regard or care of mentally ill Vancouverites), along with the flight of the wealthy and middle class to the suburbs, contributed to the decline and lack of investment in the Downtown Eastside. By the 1970s and 1980s, Vancouver SROs' reputations were poor. A 1989 University of British Columbia thesis by Mercedes Mompel Antolin asserted that only 10–20% of SROs were of good or acceptable quality at the time of writing. And even by 1989, the number of SROs was diminishing: 2,704 units were lost in the period between 1978 and 1986, largely due to the pressures of an increasingly hot real estate market.

Real estate market pressures on SRO tenants have not abated in the 30 years since that thesis was published. The market stock of SROs is decreasing both in terms of vacancy rates and in terms of affordability, and quality of life in SROs is highly variable. Certain privately owned SRO hotels in Vancouver are notorious for their poor maintenance, absentee landlords, crime, and frequency of drug overdoses; the Sahota family has been responsible for the ownership of many such SRO hotels, such as the Regent and the Balmoral, both of which were ordered to close and were expropriated by the City of Vancouver. While the loss of these residences does not constitute the loss of quality rental stock (the Balmoral and the Regent were plagued by systemic and deliberate neglect, and tenants had to be evacuated), the decline in availability of affordable housing has been exacerbated by the closure of some SRO hotels.

== Uses ==
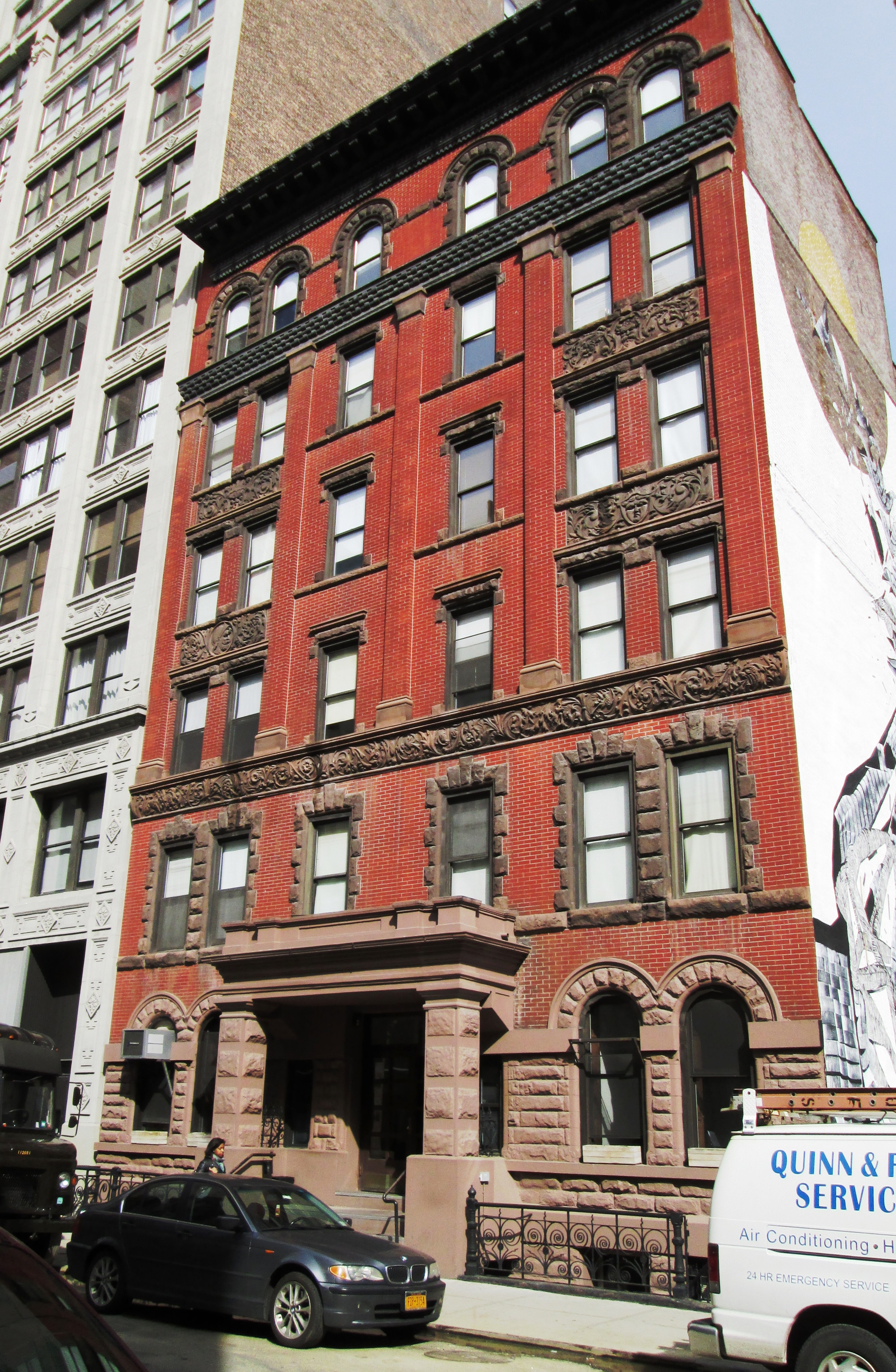
The St. Francis Residence in New York City was turned into an SRO hotel in 1951. In the 1980s, it was turned into supportive housing for low-income tenants.

SROs are a viable housing option for students, single tenants, seasonal or other traveling workers, empty nester widows/widowers, divorced men or women, low-income people, or others who do not want or need large dwellings or private domestic appliances. The smaller size and limited amenities in SROs generally make them a more affordable housing option, especially in gentrifying neighborhoods or urban areas with high land values and high rents.

The rents of many poor tenants may be paid in full or in part by charitable, state, or federal programs, giving incentive to landlords to accept such tenants. Some SRO buildings are renovated with the benefit of a tax abatement, with the condition that the rooms be rented to tenants with low incomes, and sometimes specific low-income groups, such as homeless people, people with mental illness, people with HIV/AIDS, and so on. A 1991 study stated that SROs can be successfully used to provide housing for people with chronic mental illness, as SROs give residents "personal freedom and privacy" while also giving a sense of community. Some SROs are operated or funded by charities, non-profit organizations, and/or governments as a way to provide supportive housing to "special needs populations", which include people facing drug and alcohol addiction, mental health issues, or disabilities.

=== More expensive units ===
While SRO units are mostly associated with low-income renters, in cities where dwellings are expensive and scarce, there may be "middle-class SROs", a type of microapartment aimed at middle class and professional renters. The first 2010s-era micro-unit housing building in New York City, Carmel Place, opened in 2016. It has 55 studios which go from 260 to 360 square feet. An article about "21st Century SROs" states that even though there is "still a stigma around SROs because of some of the experience of the last century", there is a "growing acceptance that small spaces can be well run and safe, healthy spaces to live and can be built more cheaply.” Common's Williamsburg in Brooklyn rents single rooms where tenants share a kitchen for $2,050 per month; The Guardian states that "[s]ingle room occupancy housing is obviously not a new concept, however, the genius of late capitalism is that it has made it desirable" to high-income renters.

In 2017 in New York City, Matthew and Seth Weissman, who operate Weissman Equities, renovated a partly empty apartment building in Harlem, creating furnished SRO units with 180 to 280 square feet, which rent for $1,200 to $1,600 per month (this includes utilities and cleaning). "Luxury", "amenity-laden" SRO units are available for $2,150 from Common Baltic in Boerum Hill and for $3,050 per month from WeLive (the residential version of co-working company WeWork).

In San Francisco, Starcity is converting unused parking garages, commercial spaces and offices into single-room residential units, where tenants (tech professionals are the typical renter) get a furnished bedroom and access to wifi, janitor services and common kitchens and lounges for $1,400 to $2,400 per month, an approach that has been called "dorm living for grownups".

In Atlanta, PadSplit is a cohousing organization that converts single-family homes into single rooms that their members can occupy individually, with a shared kitchen and bathroom, along with wifi, and laundry facilities. Unlike WeLive, which is aimed at high-income professionals, PadSplit is aimed at working-class members, and it has single-room dues from $500 to $750 per month.

== Regulations and standards ==
=== Conditions ===
Depending on the landlords and the quality of the properties, SRO conditions can range from squalor to something like an extended-stay, basic hotel. Some have been designed and run in a dormitory fashion. Others have been "cage" hotels, in which a large room is split into many smaller ones with corrugated steel or sheetrock dividers or cubicles, which do not reach the height of the original ceiling. To prevent tenants from climbing over the walls into each other's spaces, the tops of the rooms are covered in chicken wire, making the rooms look something like cages. A 1991 article in Social Work calls SRO hotels the "nation's least desirable housing stock" and states that the facilities led to elderly people being "trapped in a situation that exacerbated their isolation and withdrawal from society", even though they were in "desperate need of social services". SRO buildings have been associated with fire risk; in Chicago alone, SROs with serious fires included Barton Hotel in 1955, the Royal Bench Hotel in 1981, the Paxton Hotel in 1993, and the J.R. Plaza Hotel (also called "the Zanzibar") in 1999. In the popular imagination, SRO hotels "carry the stigma of vice and drunkenness", and in fiction writing, there are novels where SROs are used to indicate skid row conditions.

While urban reformers who advocate for the removal of SROs state that "more 'dignified' forms of affordable housing" should be created in the place of SROs, Marco D'Eramo states that "SRO inhabitants have rejected this notion in... surveys, declaring themselves to be reasonably content with their lodger lifestyle." In the 1990s, SRO rooms in Chicago only cost about $60 less per month than renting a single-room apartment; however, SROs do not require a two-month deposit paid by check or credit card (thus requiring a bank account) and a guarantee of regular income (standard requirements for apartments). SRO hotels differ from government and nonprofit housing services in that whereas these facilities have requirements for "minimum age, alcoholic or drug program eligibility, religious affiliation, welfare system dependency", SRO hotels were anonymous and generally accepted anyone who could pay the monthly rent, without requiring identification and information for official databases, setting restrictions on when residents could enter or leave, or requiring exposure to religious recruitment. A study of 485 New York City SRO tenants found that elderly people wanted to stay in their SRO units, so that they could live in "centrally located neighborhoods where apartment housing was beyond their means", without sharing a room. The study concluded that for "many elderly residents, SROs meet needs not easily met by available alternatives" and recommended maintaining SROs as an option for seniors.

A 2013 study of the approximately 3,000 SRO tenants who live in Vancouver's Downtown Eastside found that two-thirds were previously homeless and had an average of three illnesses each, with 95% facing substance dependence and almost two-thirds doing injection drugs. Nearly half had psychosis or a neurological disorder and 18% were HIV-positive. About 28% of the participants were Indigenous. The death rate of the SRO tenants was five times greater than the general population. In a 2018 paper, Barbic et al. stated that young adults living in Vancouver SROs were a "vulnerable" and low-income group with "complex health and substance problems compared to their peers in the general population", typically on "median two co-occurring illnesses, including mental, neurological, and infectious diseases", and all had "lifetime alcohol and cannabis use, with pervasive use of stimulants and opioids", and they had a great deal of contact with the "health, social, and justice systems".

SRO hotels are "often viewed as unsafe by youth" in Canada who are seeking affordable housing. At a Vancouver protest calling for more affordable housing, singer and actor Dalannah Gail Bowen stated that SRO units are "'horrible' places to live" that have "squalor, like Third World countries" that "[n]o one deserves to live in". Illegal, unlicensed SRO units that are created in homes and apartment buildings may be overcrowded and lack fire exits and ventilation. In 2013, SROs were described as a "poorly regulated last resort for the most desperate populations."

=== Debate and legal issues ===
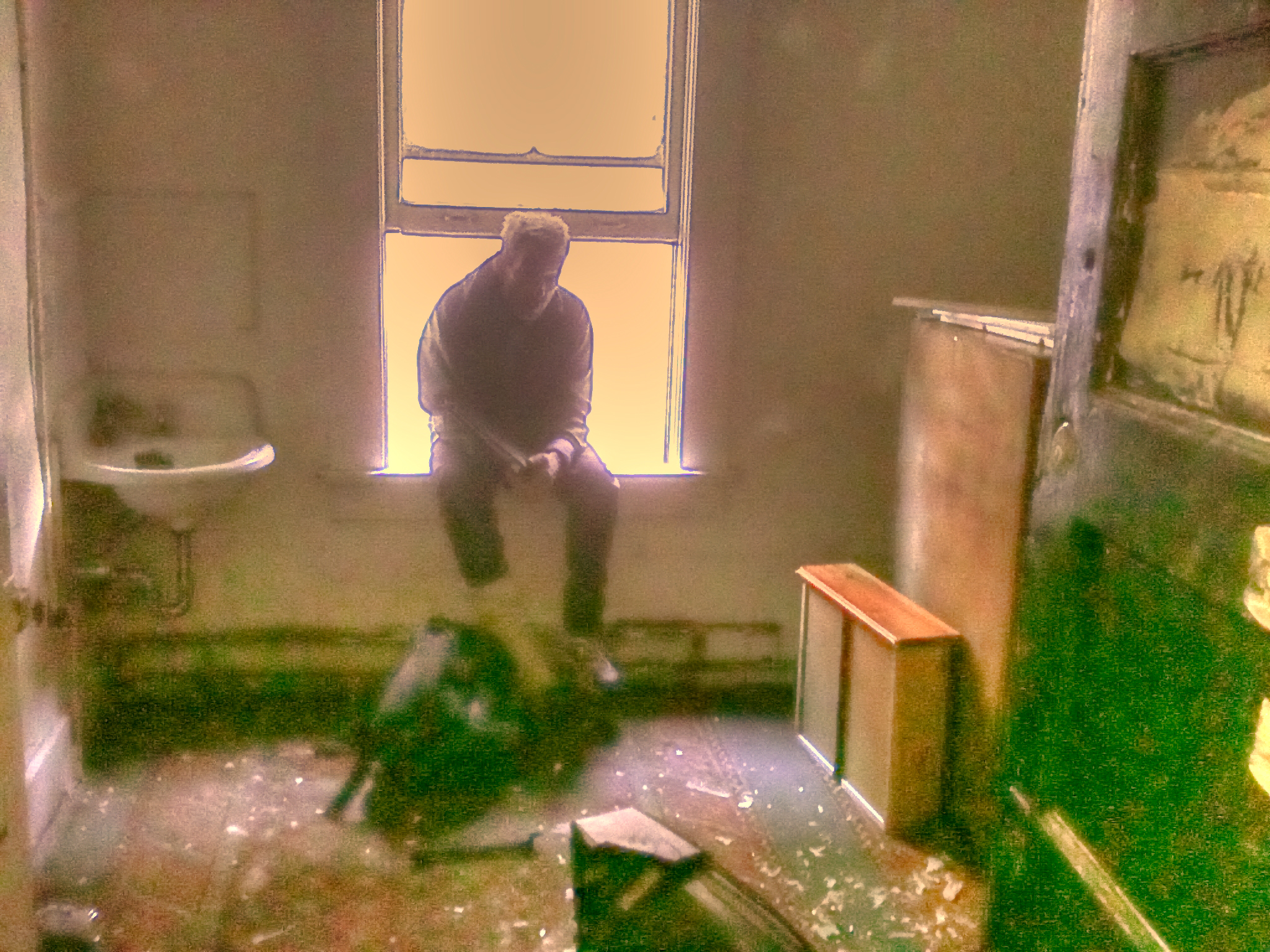
A maintenance worker at an SRO hotel pauses while renovating an old room.

In Vancouver's Downtown Eastside, an impoverished district where many SROs and homeless shelters are located, the B.C. Supreme Court ruled against an SRO hotel's requirement that visitors to the building show government-issued identification prior to entry. The hotel argued that the ID requirements were needed to provide a safe housing environment in what they called a "dangerous neighbourhood" with a "unique demographic" of individuals who are addicted to drugs and alcohol. The tenant who took the SRO to court argued that the policy was too restrictive, as many of his guests did not have ID. In the first ruling by the Residential Tenancy Branch, an arbitrator held that landlords cannot "unreasonably restrict access by guests to a rental property". The B.C. Supreme Court supported the arbitrator's decision, stating that there was no evidence that the tenant in the case had a history of issues with his behaviour on the property, and nor did his guests; the judge said that tenants and their guests should be protected against "unreasonable interference from landlords".

The construction of new SROs or conversion of existing homes to multiple SRO units was banned in New York City in 1955 due to concerns that they provided "substandard housing conditions" that were "improper and unsafe".

Renters of illegal SRO units typically live in units that do not meet health and safety standards; as well, since the units are unregulated, the renters do not have protection against eviction or rent increases. Many SRO buildings, particularly in major cities, face strong development pressure for conversion to more profitable uses as condos, luxury apartments or high-end hotels. Some cities have regulated the conversion of SROs to other uses in order to prevent landlords from forcibly evicting SRO tenants, while conversely many others limit the conversion of other uses into SROs and restrict them via zoning.

Some cities do both simultaneously, protecting existing SROs while making it virtually impossible to create new ones. A 2014 article about SRO housing in San Francisco stated that SROs have become a "key urban built environment used to house poor populations with co-occurring drug use and mental health issues"; specifically, it found that women drug users in SROs have more "post-traumatic stress disorder (PTSD), anxiety, and depression versus "stably housed women".

=== Possible development ===
In 2007, the musician Beyoncé provided $1 million towards the building of a $4 million SRO facility in Houston called Knowles-Temenos Place Apartments, which aim to provide supportive SRO housing for people trying to overcome "personal and natural disasters". The facility provides tenants with a shared business center (including computers and Internet access), with the individual rooms having a bath, mini refrigerator, mini-stove and a flat screen TV (wall-mounted), with the aesthetics and build quality similar to new apartment buildings in the downtown and midtown.

In SROs that are old, deteriorating hotels, some of the former amenities created for the hotel may have a new function for the current low-income SRO residents; for example, the lobby becomes a place for tenants to "wait for the ambulance, or to meet your addiction counselor, or to laugh and sing." In some old hotels that are now SROs, the nearby storefronts have transitioned from high-end restaurants and clothing shops (in the past) to "HIV-AIDS outreach groups, nongovernmental organizations, and social services offices". While most SROs are former residential hotels, some other building types have been repurposed into SRO usage, including mortuaries, dry cleaner facilities, nursing homes and schools.

== See also ==
- Apartment hotel
- Bedsit
- Bedspace apartment
- Boarding house
- Co-living
- Flatshare
- Hasukjib and Gosiwon, variants of SRO in South Korea
- Hostel
- House in multiple occupation
- Kot
- Lease-by-room
- List of human habitation forms
- Microapartment
- Short-term rental

== Documentaries ==
- Caged Men: Tales from Chicago's SRO Hotels (2017). Directed by Aaron Shipp.
- Single Room Occupancy. A short documentary about Harlem SROs facing gentrification.
