= Microapartment =

Type of house

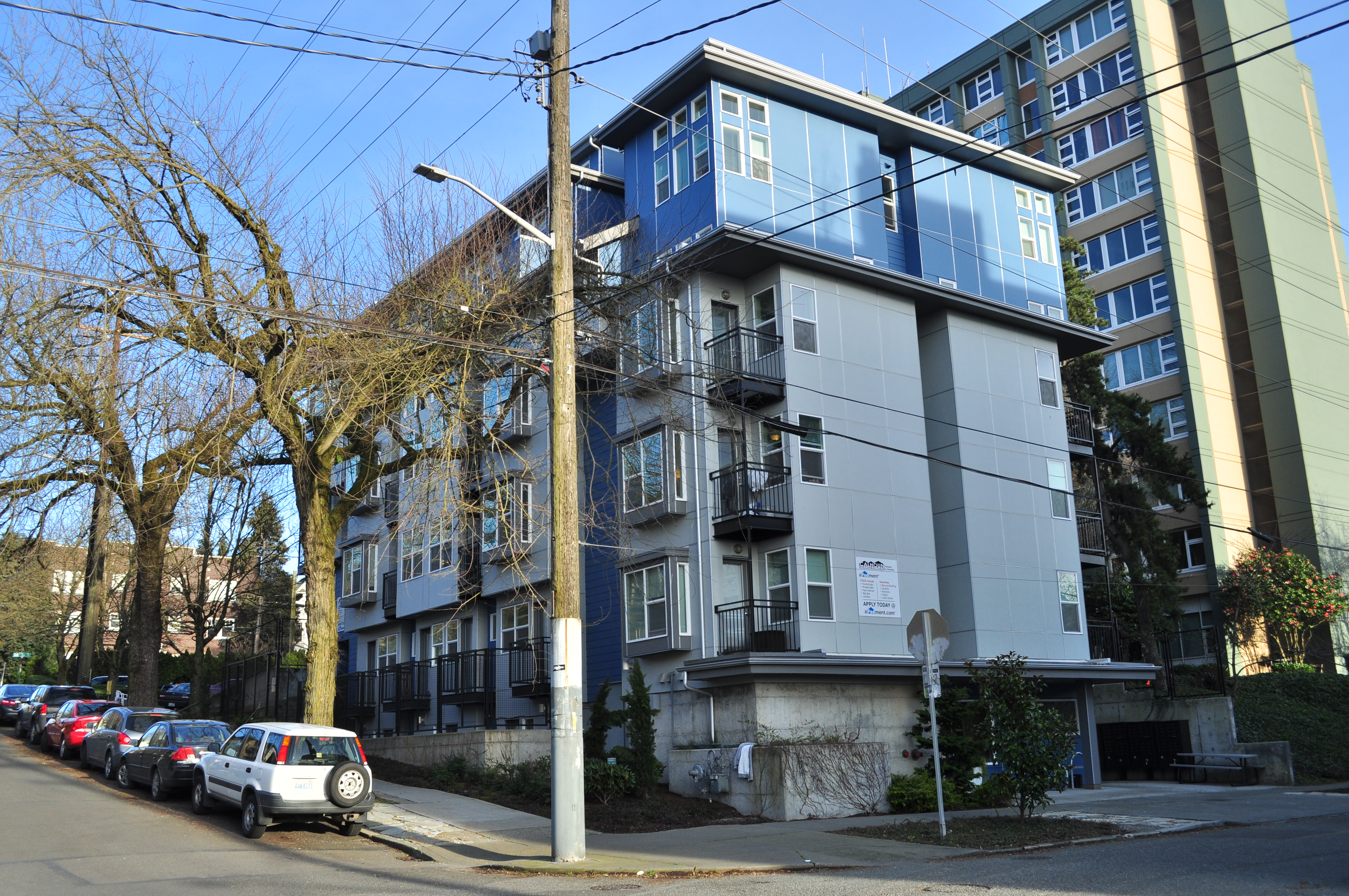
"Apodment" microapartment building, Capitol Hill, Seattle

A microapartment, also known as a microflat, micro-condo, or micro-unit is a one-room, self-contained living space, usually purpose built, designed to accommodate a sitting space, sleeping space, bathroom and kitchenette with 14–32 square metres (150–350 sq ft).

Microapartments are becoming popular in urban centres in Europe, Japan, Hong Kong, China, South Africa and North America, maximizing profits for developers and landlords and providing relatively low-priced accommodation.

Unlike a traditional studio flat, residents may also have access to a communal kitchen, communal bathroom/shower, patio and roof garden. The microapartments are often designed for futons, or with pull-down beds, folding desks and tables, and extra-small or hidden appliances. Microapartments also differ from bedsits, the traditional British bed-sitting room, in that they are self-contained, with their own bathroom, toilet, and kitchenette.

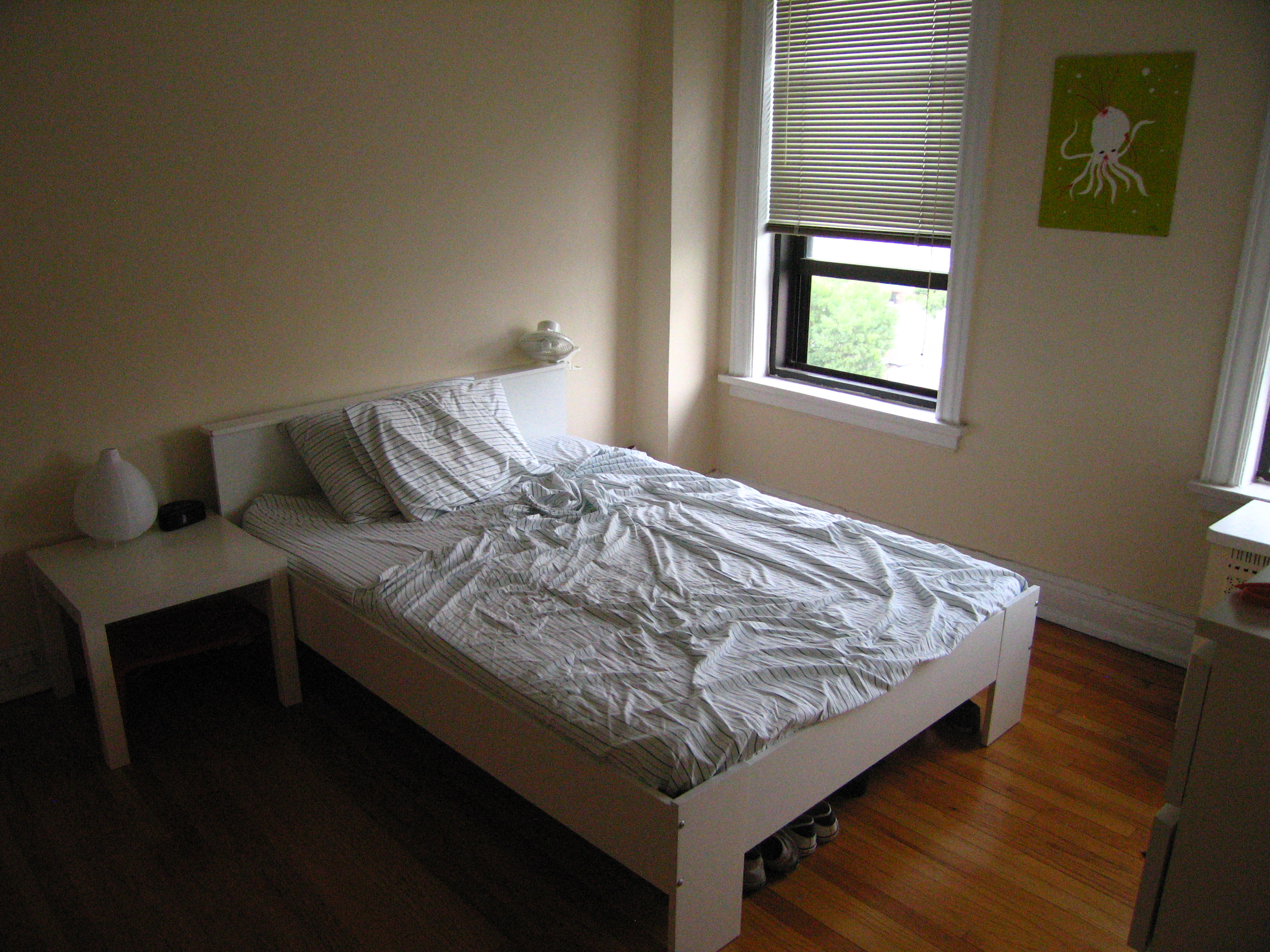
Bedrooms in microapartments need to be tiny and may also serve as a living room.

== Regions ==
=== Canada ===
Units under 500 square feet are referred to as micro-units, and units under 200 square feet are referred to as nanounits. Development for such units expanded starting around 2015 in Toronto, while Vancouver bylaws limited the minimum for condo units to 398 square feet and rental units to 320 square feet.

Micro-units are typically inhabited by investors who are small entrepreneurs who own one or multiple units in markets like Toronto. Micro-condos are marketed more towards international students, newcomers, entry-level workers, empty-nesters, and those who do not want roommates any longer. For developers it is easier to make money on micro-units with higher returns, due to more of the general public being able to afford a smaller place and give other options to buyers besides 1 or 2 bedroom units. Other reasons developers have cited to build micro-units include lack of housing affordability, increases in the price of land, and the rising cost of construction. Micro-units often command a higher rent per square foot than larger unit sizes. Instead of more mixed-housing for long term tenants, micro-condos are often justified behind the idea that the city or condo amenities offer whatever else is needed. This does not include for those who work from home, or have other lifestyle needs at home. As a result of the lack of mixed-housing and intensification, fewer families are now staying in the city. Micro-condos are more common to be unsold inventory in times of downturn in the real estate market.

In Toronto, some micro-condos do not have appliances like a standalone oven, instead relying on convection microwaves. Other modifications include stovetops with only two burners and smaller sinks. A decline in cooking with the rise of food delivery apps have partially encouraged the reason for the change of appliances to be modified or removed. Some designs to maximize space include drop down Murphy beds, stacked laundry, floating desks, slide out shelves. These designs allow the developer to save thousands of dollars in developing cost. Such units are also aimed at short term rental options such as for Airbnb users.

=== Hong Kong ===
Gary Chang, an architect in Hong Kong, has designed a large 32-square-metre (344 sq ft) microapartment with sliding walls attached to tracks on the ceiling. By moving the walls around, and using built-in folding furniture and worktops, he can convert the space into 24 different rooms, including a kitchen, library, laundry room, dining room, bar and video-game room.

In Hong Kong, developers are embracing the micro-living trend, renting microapartments at sky-high prices. The Wall Street Journal compares the 180-square-feet flat in High Place, Sai Ying Pun to the size of a U.S. parking spot (160 square feet) in a video, highlighting the soaring property prices in Hong Kong (one of the apartments in High Place was sold for more than US$500,000 in June 2015).

=== Italy ===
In Rome, where the average price of property in 2010 was $7,800 per square metre ($725 per square foot), microapartments as small as 4 square metres (45 square feet) have been advertised.

=== United States ===
In the United States, most cities have zoning codes that set the minimum size for a housing unit (often 400 square feet) as well as the number of non-related persons who can live together in one unit. Tiny apartments began as a coastal city trend but they are spreading to the Midwestern United States.

==== New York City ====
Micro apartments have been around in New York City since at least the 19th century. The average size of a New York City tenement unit back then was around 284 square feet, and four or more people would cram into that tiny space. In June 2016, New York City got its first microapartment building, Carmel Place, with 55 units that are as small as 250 square feet (23 m^{2}) and ceilings from nine to ten feet (2.7 to 3.0 m). Common's Williamsburg in Brooklyn rents single rooms where tenants share a kitchen for $2,050 per month; The Guardian states that "[s]ingle room occupancy housing is obviously not a new concept, however, the genius of late capitalism is that it has made it desirable" to high-income renters".

==== California ====
In 2017, California passed a law that encourages development of "efficiency units" of at least 150 sq ft by disallowing localities from limiting their numbers near public universities and public transportation. In San Francisco, Starcity is converting unused parking garages, commercial spaces and offices into single room residential units, where tenants (tech professionals are the typical renter) get a furnished bedroom and access to wifi, janitor services and common kitchens and lounges for $1,400 to $2,400 per month, an approach that has been called "dorm living for grown ups".

In 2018, newly built one-room rentals in San Francisco at the Starcity development, aimed at high-income tenants, were referred to as single room occupancy rooms "by another name".

==== Boston ====
Boston's first microapartment building opened in August 2016, on Commonwealth Avenue in Packard's Corner. As the largest microapartment building in the United States, the building is currently being leased by Boston University to house 341 students during the renovation of another university residence. The building contains 180 units that each contain a bathroom with stand-up shower; a kitchen with all stainless-steel appliances that include an oven, a microwave, a dishwasher, and a refrigerator. Each unit also includes a stand up washer-dryer unit. Other amenities include an optional parking garage and indoor bike room in the basement, currently unused retail space, a lounge space, a rooftop penthouse, a deck overlooking the Allston neighbors, and an entertainment room that will be converted to a fitness center at the end of the University's tenure at the property, which is anticipated to be in 2018.

==== Seattle ====
There has been a backlash in some cities against the increasing number of microapartments. In Seattle, some residents have complained that high-density microhousing changes the character of neighborhoods, suddenly increasing demand for parking spaces and other amenities. From 2009 to 2014, Seattle had a big increase in the building and creation of new single room occupancy (SRO) units designed to be rented at market rates, which had an average monthly rent of $660; In 2013, for example, 1,800 SRO units and microapartment units were built. In 2018, the media depicted the increasing popularity of micro apartments as a new trend; however, an article about Seattle in Market Urbanism Report states this is a "reenactment of the way U.S. cities have long worked", as individuals seeking "solo living and centralized locations" are willing to accept smaller apartments even though the per-square-foot prices may be higher than some larger units. The report states that 2018-era micro apartments were known as SROs in the early 20th century, and they housed "rich and poor alike" (although the rich lived in live-in luxury hotels and the poor lived in "bunkhouses for day laborers"). Neighborhood groups in Seattle have criticized new micro apartment SRO units, arguing that they "harmed community character and provided...inhumane living conditions"; the city passed regulations that outlawed micro apartment/SRO construction.

=== United Kingdom ===
In the UK, property developers are using office-to-residential permitted development rights, a policy introduced in 2013, to transform old office buildings into microapartment developments. The nationally described space standard stipulates that new homes in the UK cannot be smaller than 37sqm; however, this does not apply to conversions. London-based developer Inspired Homes has taken advantage of office-to-residential permitted development rights to deliver over 400 microapartments. A micro-property in the UK has no strict definition but typically refers to properties with a floor area below 37sqm. Which? magazine reported that almost 8,000 new micro-homes were built in 2016, the highest number on record.

As of 2017, the largest microapartment building in the world is The Collective Old Oak, which opened in London on May 1, 2016. Designed by PLP Architecture, the development has 546 rooms with most units grouped into "twodios" – two en-suite bedrooms that share a small kitchenette. There are also some private suites. The units sizes range from 9.2 square metres (99 sq ft) for an ensuite room with a 5.8 square metres (62 sq ft) shared kitchenette, to 12 square metres (130 sq ft) for a shared ensuite and 16.5 square metres (178 sq ft) shared ensuite with kitchenette. Each floor features one larger kitchen with a dining table, which is shared between 30 and 70 residents, and themed communal living spaces such as a games room, a cinema, a 'disco-launderette', a hidden garden and a spa. A restaurant, gym and co-working spaces are located in the lower floors of the building.

== Criticism ==
The quality of living in microapartments has been called into question due to a lack of space.

Susan Saegert, a professor of environmental psychology at the CUNY Graduate Center stated that "I've studied children in crowded apartments and low-income housing a lot," Saegert said, "and they can end up becoming withdrawn, and have trouble studying and concentrating." The small size of a microapartment can be an issue with some tenants, as its confined nature may permit strong odors to linger.

Samuel D. Gosling states that "an apartment has to fill other psychological needs as well, such as self-expression and relaxation, that might not be as easily met in a highly cramped space". In micro-apartments occupied by multiple people privacy can be an issue.

== See also ==
- Bedsit
- Capsule hotel
- List of house types
- Minimalist architecture and space
- One-room mansion
- Pied-à-terre
- Single room occupancy
- Studio condo or studio apartment
- Rooming house
- Western-style futons
