= The Capital Hotels & Apartments =

The Capital Hotels, Apartments, and Resorts
- Type: Private
- Industry: Hospitality
- Founded: 2008
- Founder: Marc Wachsberger
- Headquarters: Sandton, South Africa
- Number of locations: 12
- Area served: South Africa
- Key people: Marc Wachsberger (CEO)
- Products: Hotels, serviced apartments
- Website: thecapital.co.za

The Capital Hotels, Apartments, and Resorts (also known as The Capital Hotel Group) is a South African hotel chain offering serviced apartments and hotel accommodation. The company was founded in 2008 by Marc Wachsberger and is headquartered in Sandton, Johannesburg. It operates 12 properties across major South African cities including Johannesburg, Cape Town, Pretoria, Durban, and Mbombela.

== History ==
Marc Wachsberger established The Capital during the 2008 financial crisis. The group began by converting residential apartments into serviced hotel-style accommodation, aiming to reduce overheads and offer lower rates than traditional hotels.

By 2018, The Capital opened its flagship R500 million hotel, The Capital On The Park, in Sandton. During the COVID-19 pandemic, the group adapted its business model by offering long-stay apartments for isolation and remote working, and created recovery hotels for COVID-19 patients.

In 2021, the group acquired the Fairmont Zimbali Resort (later rebranded as The Capital Zimbali), and reopened Cape Town's 15 on Orange Hotel under its brand.

== Business model ==
The Capital's hotel rooms are designed to be similar to apartments to attract more long-term guests who may still not want to rent an apartment. Each property includes a mix of traditional hotel rooms and fully serviced apartments. Amenities typically include room service, housekeeping, kitchenettes, meeting spaces, gyms, and pools. This hybrid approach is designed to cater to both business and leisure travelers, particularly those on long-term stays.

== Properties ==
- Johannesburg: The Capital Empire, The Capital On The Park, The Capital Melrose, The Capital Rosebank, The SEVEN Villa Hotel and Spa
- Pretoria: The Capital Menlyn Maine, The Capital Trilogy
- Cape Town: The Capital 15 on Orange, The Capital Mirage
- Durban: The Capital Pearls (Umhlanga), The Capital Zimbali (Ballito)
- Mbombela: The Capital Mbombela
