= Studio apartment =

Type of apartment

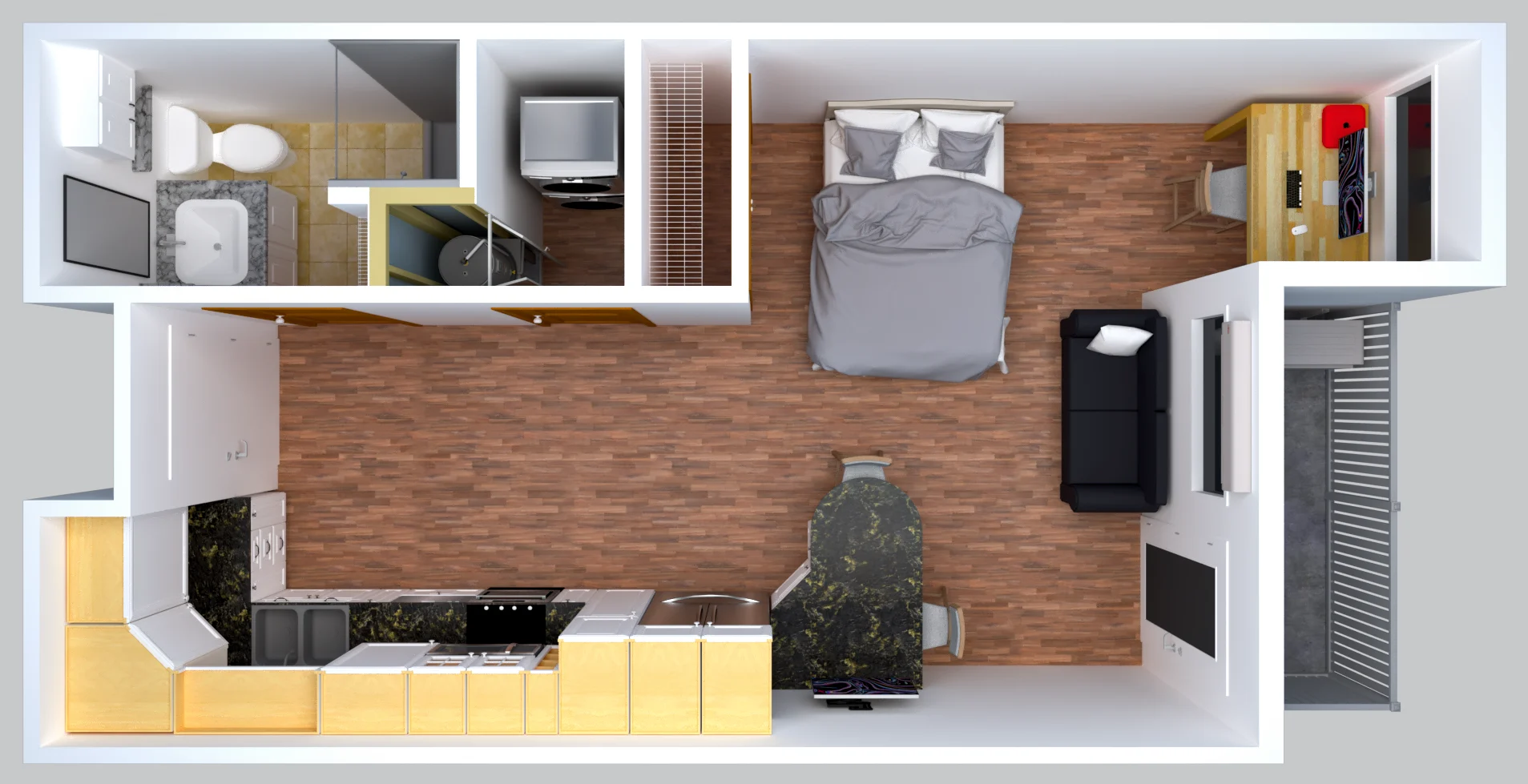
Studio condo layout with one main living area and no separate bedroom

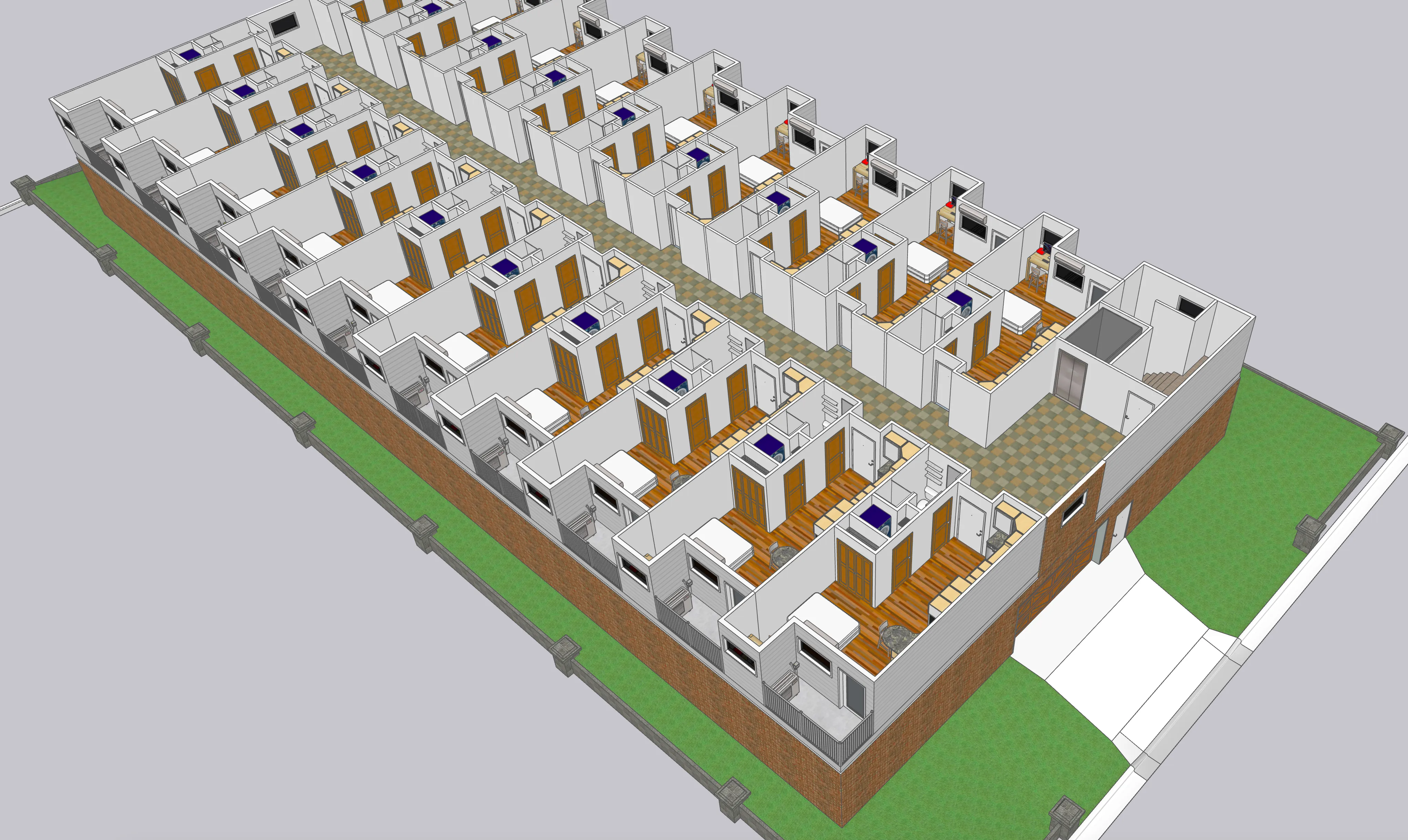
1-over-1 studio condos

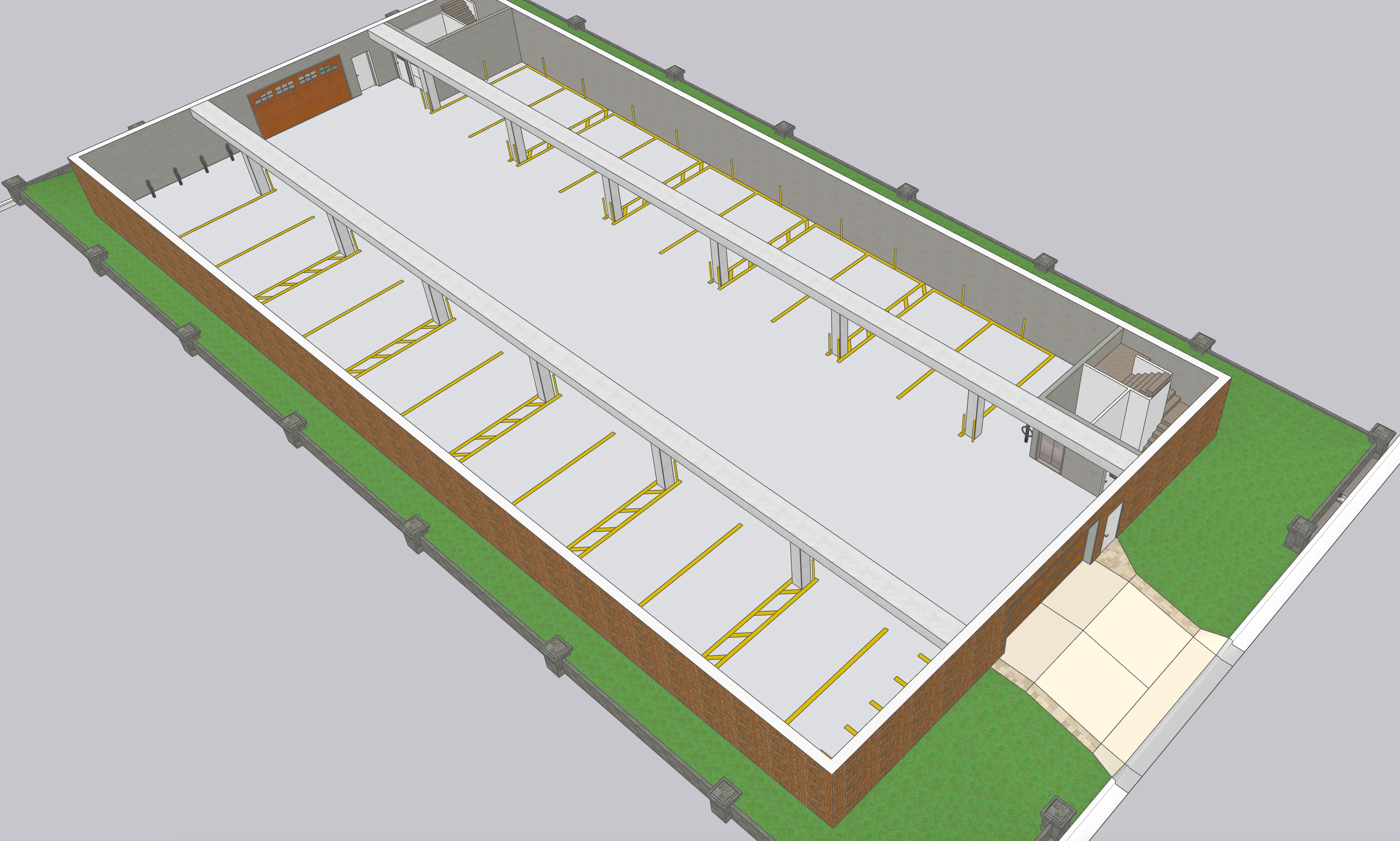
Parking down below

19 studio condos and 22 parking spaces below a heat pump on the balcony

A studio apartment or studio condo, also known as a studio flat (UK), self-contained apartment (Nigeria, Ghana), efficiency apartment, bed-sitter (Kenya), or bachelor apartment (Poland), is a small dwelling in which the normal functions of a number of rooms – often the living room, bedroom, and kitchen – are combined into a single room.

Some studio apartments include a private washroom, which may or may not include a bath or shower. Otherwise, washrooms and bathing facilities are often part of a common area accessible by the residents of multiple units, with various arrangements to ensure privacy. Some studio apartments also offer extra storage space which may or may not be attached to the main unit.

For their occupants, studio apartments offer the advantage of being considerably cheaper to rent or buy compared to multi-room dwellings, the resident only having to give up living space as opposed to the level of privacy that is the case when living as a roommate. Studio apartments have historically been offered mainly for rent; however, in recent years the units have been increasingly sold as condos in response to rising housing costs making larger dwellings unaffordable to many would-be home buyers.

== Design ==
The studio apartment is defined by the International Building Code, which has been adopted in modified form by most jurisdictions in the United States, as "a dwelling unit where all permanent provisions for living, sleeping, eating, and cooking are contained in a single room".

A variation, sometimes called an "alcove studio", may have a very small separate area; this wing or nook is off the main area, and can be used for dining or sleeping. The apartment's kitchen facilities may be located either in the central room or in a small separate area. The bathroom is usually in its own smaller room.

Studio apartment sizes vary considerably by country.

A studio apartment differs from a bedsitter in the United Kingdom or single room occupancy (SRO) unit in the United States, in that an SRO does not usually contain a kitchen or bathroom. Bathroom facilities are shared with multiple units on the hall.

== Global variations ==
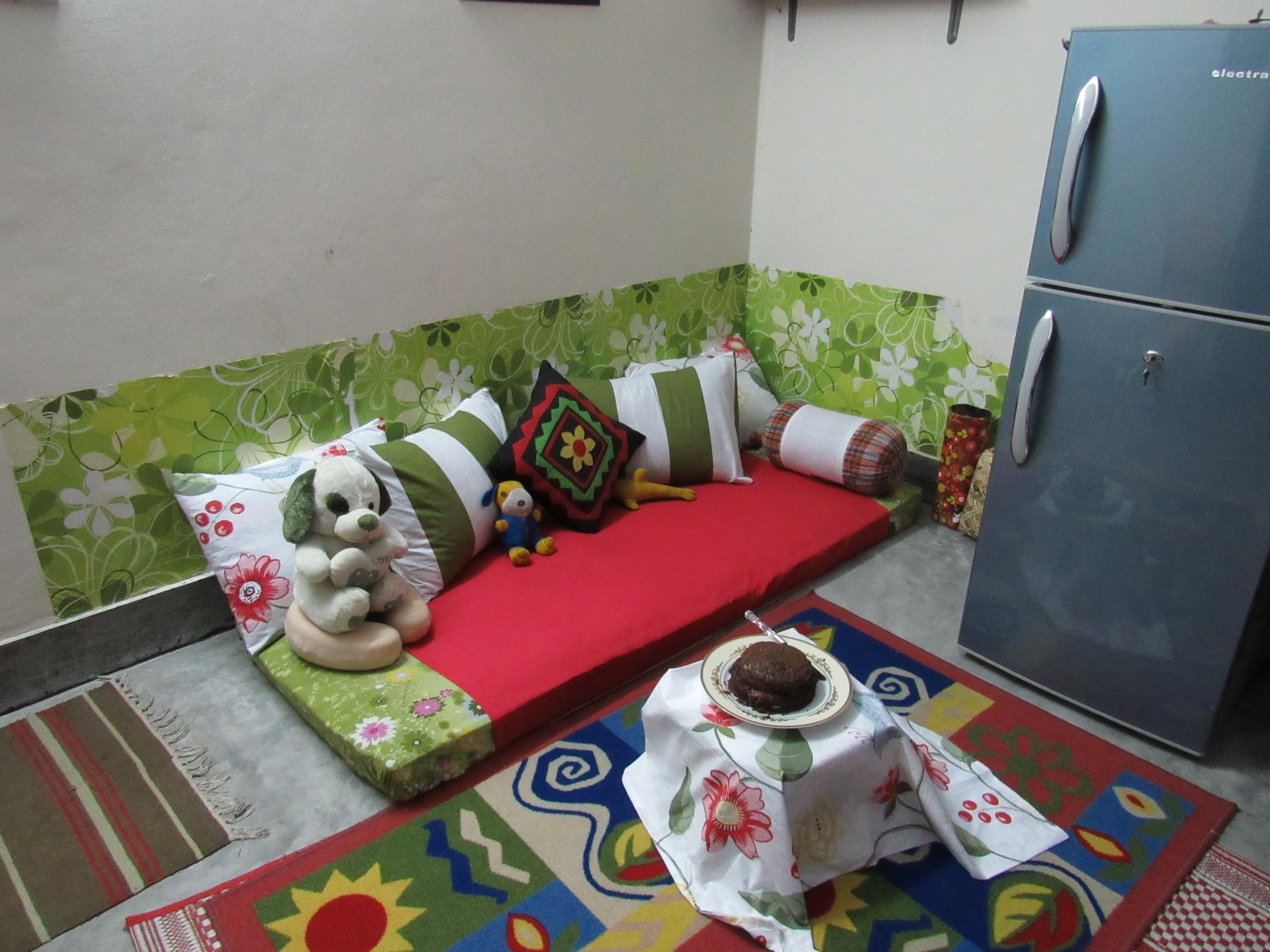
Common area of a studio in Bangladesh (2016)

Argentina
In Argentina, a studio apartment is called "monoambiente" (in Spanish, "mono-" is a prefix for one, and "ambiente" means room).
Australia
In Australia, a studio apartment is usually between 20 and 40 square meters. Features can vary. Studios will have a lounge area, and some will also have kitchenette, and a study nook. The main difference to other types of Australian apartments is, in a studio, instead of being in separate rooms, the living spaces are in the same room as the sleeping arrangements.
Austria
In Austria, a studio apartment is traditionally called Garçonnière (derived from French garçon, meaning boy, young man, or bachelor) (commonly spelled Garconniere); the term "Einzimmerwohnung" (literally one-room apartment) is also widely used. Garconnieres are usually between 20 and 40 square meters (215–430 ft^{2}), and consist of a combined bathroom and toilet, the main room with a kitchenette, and a small antechamber ("Vorzimmer") connecting the two and leading to the corridor and stairwell outside the apartment. Garconnieres in large tenements were the typical homes of workers, and often their families, during and after the "Gründerzeit" ("founders' period"), the time of industrialization in the 19th century in Austria in Germany. Many pre-WWII Garconnieres even today do not provide bathroom facilities of their own but facilities that are shared by all residents on the floor, whereas more modern Garconnieres are fully equipped.
Brazil
In Brazil, a studio apartment is called "quitinete" (from kitchenette) or "quarto-e-sala" (literally, bedroom and [living] room). It is basically composed of one room, one bathroom, and a kitchen, which is often in the same space as the room. Lately, newly built quitinetes are starting to be called "studios", for the modern appeal English as a foreign language has.
Canada

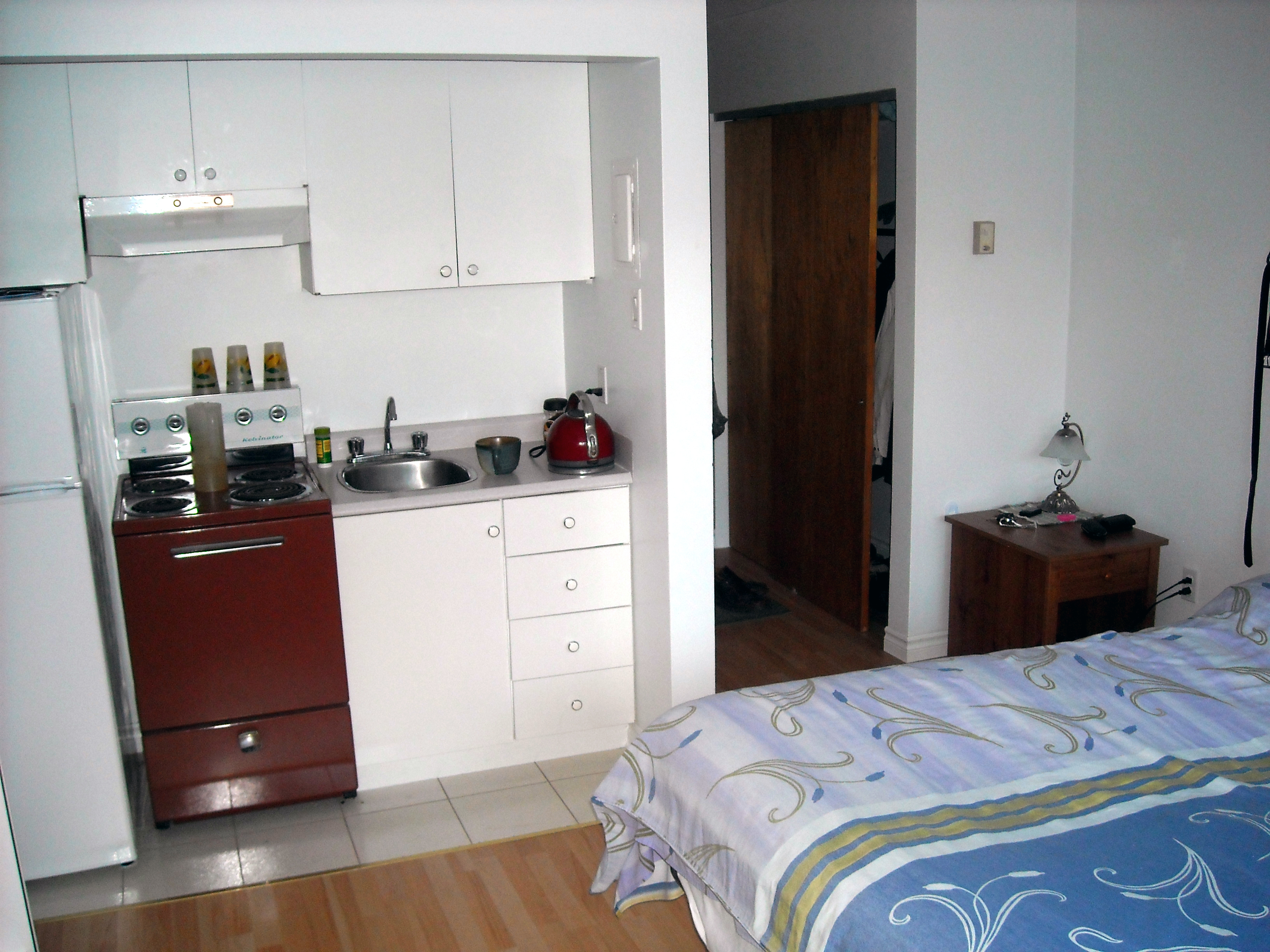
Cuisinette studio in Sherbrooke, Quebec, Canada (2010)

In Canada, a bachelor apartment, or simply "bachelor," is the common term in Canadian English for any single room dwelling unit which is not a shared accommodation. A shared room, or particularly small bachelor, is sometimes referred to as a "bachelorette." Residents of the province of Quebec (most in French) widely use the term "studio" or "one and a half".
Czech Republic
In the Czech Republic, garsoniéra, often referred to as garsonka (from French garçon, meaning boy, young man, bachelor), is a one-room apartment with separate bathroom and WC, abbreviated as 1+0, sometimes it is 1 room with separate bathroom and WC and kitchenette, abbreviated 1+KK.
Denmark
In Denmark, they refer to a studio apartment as a "one room apartment" (1 værelses lejlighed). A studio apartment is not to be confused with a study apartment in Danish, which is accommodations that you are only allowed to rent if you are a student. These are often very cheap but in a rather good condition, close to a higher education facility and very small. Rarely larger than 40 square meters.
Finland

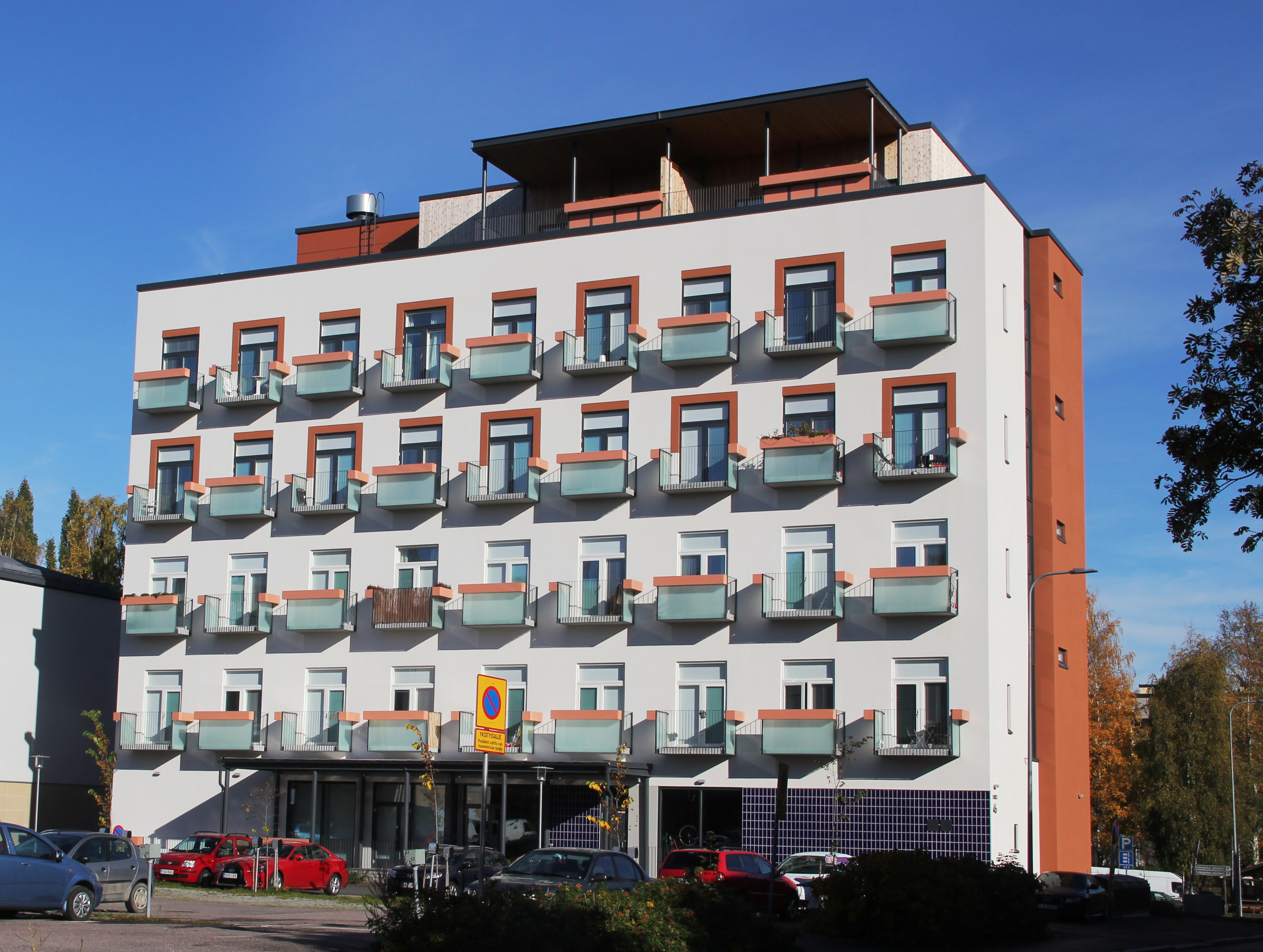
Block of studio flats in Vantaa, Finland (2018)

In Finland, a studio apartment is called yksiö (from the word yksi meaning "one"), and are advertised as one-room apartments (a one-bedroom apartment is referred to as "two rooms"). The building of such apartments is a growing trend throughout Finland; 55% of new homes in the city of Turku are studio apartments with total areas of under 37 square meters. Between 1970 and 2020, the percentage of one-person households in Finland has almost tripled, from 15.7% to 45.3%.
Germany
In Germany, studio apartments are called Einzimmerwohnungen ("Ein" means one, "Zimmer" means room, and "Wohnung" means apartment).
Greece
In Greece, studio apartments were traditionally called γκαρσονιέρα (from the French garçonnière), alternatively the usage of the loanword στούντιο (studio) can be attested as well. Whilst there's no clear difference at the etymological level (in dictionary entries) some distinguish the term γκαρσονιέρα as an apartment with a separate bedroom.
Hong Kong
In Hong Kong, a studio apartment (a mini apartment) sized around 10 square metres (110 sq ft) in addition of a bathroom and kitchen can cost up to US$20,000. The living area could be just around the size of a parking space.
India
In India, studio apartments in general are called one room kitchen (1RK) apartments, featuring a hallway with a bedroom with a bathroom and attached kitchenette to the hall, (mostly used by one or two people or a small family). The area ranges from 200 to 450 square feet (19 to 42 m^{2}).
Italy
In Italy, Italians call them "monolocale", meaning "one room". There is only one room with a kitchenette, and a separate bathroom.
Jamaica
In Jamaica, studio apartments are commonly referred to as quads, and are a common feature in Eastern Kingston. They generally consist of one main room, acting as the living room, dining room and bedroom. The kitchen exists within the same room, with partitioning wall. The bathroom is in a smaller room, by itself. These studio apartments generally come with adequate yard space and washing facilities (on the outdoors). They have a bed, a stove and a TV too.
Japan
Japan has an even smaller variation of the studio apartment known as the one room mansion.
Kenya
In Kenya, they are commonly known as a bed-sitter. Rent varies from KSh.5,000 – 10,000/=, the equivalent of US$48.61–97.22. They are common places for young people to live when they start working.
New Zealand
In New Zealand, studio apartments are known as studio rooms, and they frequently feature a bedroom with study area and an en-suite bathroom. Spaces such as kitchen, lounge and dining area are communal between other people staying in that apartment.
Nigeria
In Nigeria, Studio apartments are known as "room self-contain apartments". These apartments typically have a single room, which serves as the living room and bedroom, a kitchen, a bathroom and a toilet (which is often merged with the bathroom). This form of housing is quite different from Face to Face housing, which are normally built facing each other, and with shared toilet(s), bathroom(s) and kitchen space.
North Macedonia
In North Macedonia, garsonjera (Гарсоњера) derived from the French garçonnière. Normally a one-room plus separate bathroom, sometimes with a very small, separate kitchen.
Norway
In Norway, studio apartments are called "1-romsleilighet", "one-room-apartment" in English, because they count both the living room and the bedrooms. Hence an apartment with one bedroom is called a "two-room-apartment" (2-romsleilighet).
Portugal
In Portugal, studio apartments are designated T0 (T-Zero). This designation follows the Portuguese house classification system, where apartments are classified by their typology as Tx, with the "x" representing the number of independent bedrooms. In the case of the T0, the "0" means that the apartment has no independent bedrooms.
Poland
In Poland, studio apartments are called kawalerka ("bachelor apartment", from the word kawaler – a bachelor).
Romania
In Romania, studio apartment is known as "garsonieră", a word derived from the French garçonnière. They are usually one room plus a separate bathroom, often with a small, separate kitchen.
Russia

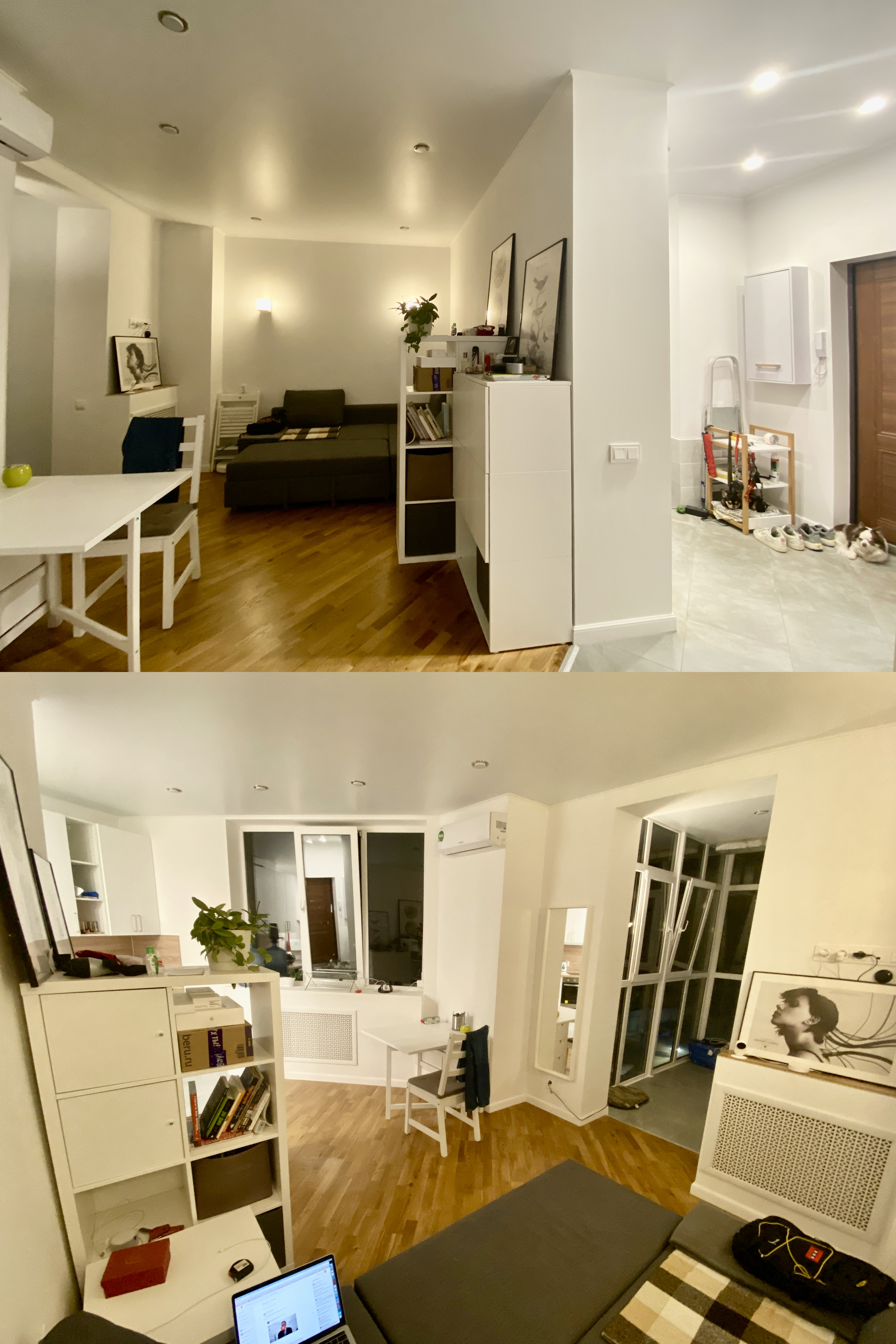
Example of a modern studio apartment in Russia

In the building codes and regulations and standards of the Russian Federation, the concept of "studio apartment" is not defined, therefore it is not possible to give an exact definition of this concept. In colloquial Russian, there is a word "studiya", which means apartments with a combined bedroom and kitchen area. Russian studio apartments are represented in different segments of real estate. In economy class, these are flats of small square footage. But studio apartments also exist on a large area, and even in elite flats. In the secondary housing market, there are studios obtained by redevelopment of apartments such as Khrushchyovka and Brezhnevkas, in which the partitions between the living room and the small kitchen and hallway are removed.
Singapore
In Singapore, studio apartments, in the context of Singapore's public housing, are flats that are specifically built by the Housing and Development Board to cater to the growing senior citizen population. One must be at least 55 years old to purchase these studio apartments. Since August 2015, the scheme was replaced by 2-room Flexi flats, which gives seniors the flexibility to select a lease period that suits them best.
Slovakia
In Slovakia, studio apartments are called garsoniéra, often referred to as garsónka or sometimes garzónka, a word from French garçon, meaning boy. This type of studio apartment is usually a one-room apartment where living room and kitchenette is combined into one room. Bathroom and toilet are usually separated. If the kitchen is separated by a wall or doors, it's called 1+1. Studio apartments in Slovakia can usually be found in Slovak housing estates (sídlisko), but they might also be in other places.
South Korea
In South Korea, studio apartments are called officetels or one rooms.
Sweden
In Sweden, the terms studio or studiolägenhet are often used in apartment advertisements to denote the lack of a separate bedroom in a small apartment with open plan design. The smaller apartments are more often called an enrummare ("a one-roomer") or an etta ("a one"), usually between 20 and 50 square meters including a toilet with shower, a kitchenette with stove and sink and sometimes a sleeping alcove. The open plan design (öppen planlösning) that combines kitchen, dining area and living room is however common also in larger apartments with one or several bedrooms (a one-bedroom apartment is referred to as a "two rooms apartment").
Taiwan
In Taiwan, studios are usually measured in ping (坪), equal to 3.3 square meters. Unlike studios in many other countries, it's less common for Taiwanese studios to contain kitchen facilities as it's normally cheaper to eat outside than to cook at home. However, most studios will have a fridge.
Turkey
In Turkey, studio apartments are called an "stüdyo daire". Usually between 30 and 50 m^{2}.
United Kingdom
In the United Kingdom, a studio flat is usually a single room with cooking facilities which has its own bathroom attached. Traditionally, if a dwelling has a shared bathroom, it is known as a bedsit. This distinction is encountered less frequently, as are bedsits themselves (especially in large cities) due to the consequences of the Housing Act 1989 discouraging landlords from offering this once widespread type of accommodation.
United States
The International Property Maintenance Code requires the main room of an efficiency unit to have clear floor area (not including the area dedicated to cooking) of at least 120 ft^{2}.

== See also ==
- Bachelor pad
- Microapartment
- Murphy bed – bed that folds out from the wall to save space
- The L-Shaped Room (novel)
- Western-style futons
