= PadSplit =

American real estate marketpalce

PadSplit is an American real estate co-living marketplace headquartered in Atlanta, Georgia.

== Overview ==
According to the New York Times, "PadSplit provides an online platform for low-income workers to find furnished rooms offered by landlords. Sometimes the landlords rent out the entire house, room by room; others rent out just a room or two. PadSplit renters have an average age of 35 and earn a median of $30,000 per year." PadSplit refers to residents as "members," and housing providers as "hosts." Rooms on the platform include utilities, Wi-Fi, and offer flexible commitment periods. Based on currently available information, the site offers rooms priced between $89/week in metro Atlanta to $494/week in metro Los Angeles

== History ==
PadSplit was founded by Atticus LeBlanc in 2017 as a result of an ideas competition, where his former company Stryant Investments, "propose[d] a project that would include a model that aims at increasing housing density and the supply of affordable housing by dividing apartments and houses into multiple units, while remaining a safe and respectable option for residents." He brought on co-founders Frank Furman, and Jon O’Bryan in Atlanta, Georgia, in 2018. In 2018, the company was selected to participate in the Atlanta Techstars program. In April 2019, PadSplit raised $4.6 million in seed funding.

In October 2019, PadSplit was selected as one of three firms to conduct a co-living pilot program administered by ShareNYC and the New York City Housing Preservation & Development.

In August 2020, PadSplit raised $10 million to expand into other cities beyond Atlanta, including Houston. At this time, PadSplit operated more than 1,000 housing units. By January 2021, PadSplit operated 1,230 units through its shared housing model, without any public subsidies. In March 2021, PadSplit opened its first co-living units in Richmond, Virginia.

In November 2021, PadSplit raised $20.5 million in a Series B round of fundraising, bringing its overall fundraising total to $34.1 million and announcing its plans to expand to Dallas, Texas, and Jacksonville, Florida. In January 2024, the company surpassed 10,000 co-living rooms and housed 23,000 people across 18 U.S. cities. By May of 2025, PadSplit surpassed 20,000 co-living units and housed 51,000 people across 27 states, without using taxpayer funding.
