= Carmel Place =

Residential building in Manhattan, New York

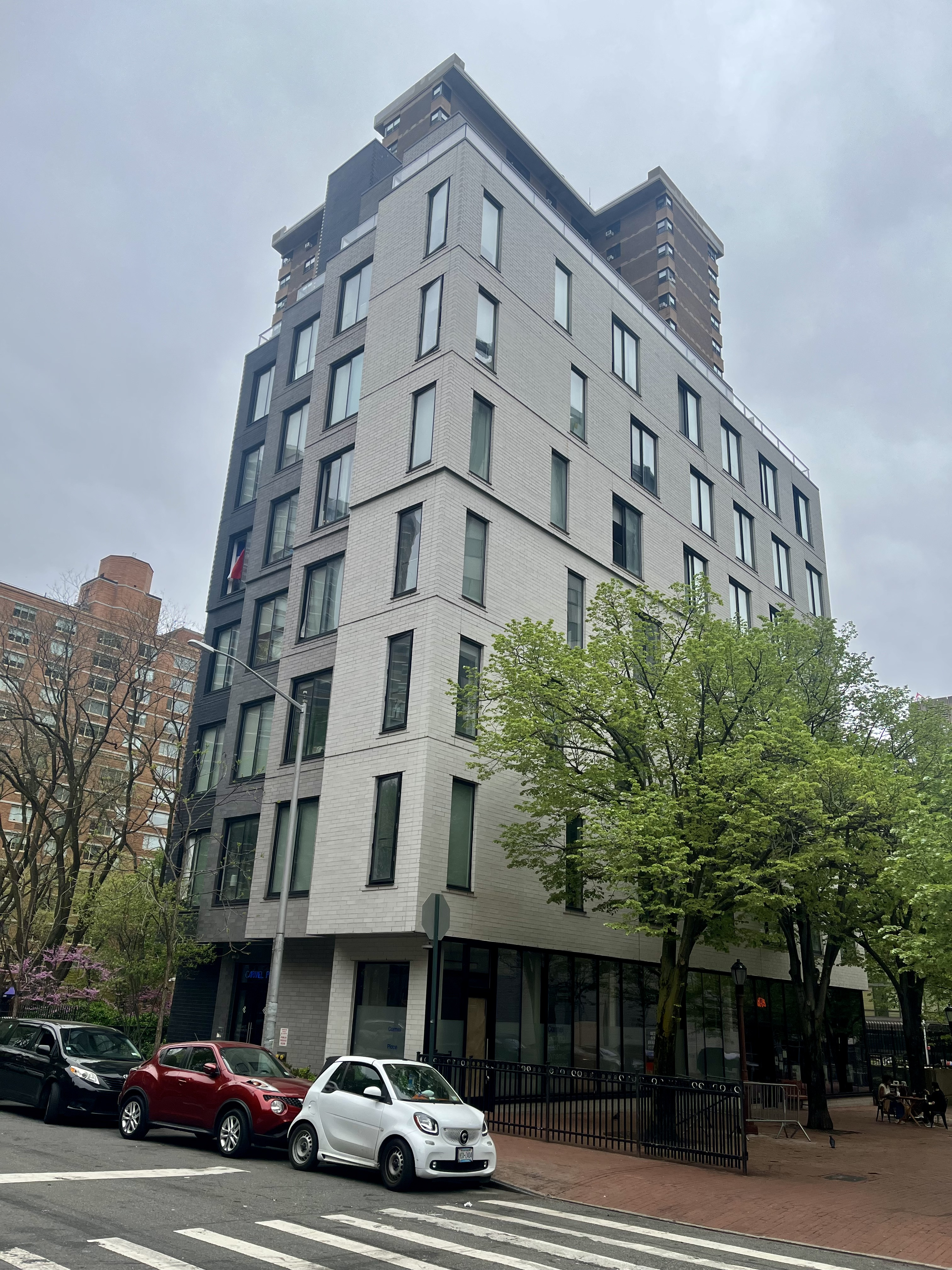
- Carmel Place in 2023
- Former names: My Micro NY

General information
- Status: Completed
- Type: Residential
- Location: 335 East 27th Street, New York City, United States
- Coordinates: 40°44′23.5″N 73°58′38.5″W
- Opened: June 1, 2016
- Operator: Common

Design and construction
- Architecture firm: nARCHITECTS
- Developer: Monadnock Development LLC
- Structural engineer: De Nardis Engineering
- Other designers: Capsys Corp. (modular fabrication)
- Main contractor: Monadnock Construction Inc.
- Awards: 2017 Honor Award (American Institute of Architects)

Other information
- Number of units: 55

Carmel Place is a nine-story apartment building at 335 East 27th Street in the Kips Bay neighborhood of Manhattan in New York City. Completed in 2016, it was New York City's first microapartment building. The project won a competition sponsored by the New York City Department of Housing Preservation and Development to design, construct and operate a "micro-unit" apartment building on a city-owned site and pilot the use of compact apartments to accommodate smaller households.

== Design competition ==
In July 2012, the New York City Department of Housing Preservation and Development (HPD) issued a Request for Proposals (RFP) named "adAPT NYC" to design, construct, and operate New York City's first "micro-unit" apartment building on a city-owned site. The objective of adAPT NYC was to pilot the use of "micro-unit" apartments (having floor areas under the minimum of 400 square feet (37 m^{2}) required by zoning) to accommodate smaller households and test the market for compact apartments. If the project was successful, the city could consider making regulatory changes to permit the construction of micro-unit apartments in other parts of the city. The adAPT NYC design competition also fulfilled a 2011 PlaNYC commitment to adapt housing models to fit the city's changing population, in which one- and two-person households were growing at a higher rate compared to those with three or more people.

The site selected for the pilot project was a 4,725-square-foot (439.0 m^{2}) city-owned lot located at the northeast corner of East 27th Street and Mount Carmel Place in the Kips Bay neighborhood of Manhattan. Previously used as a parking lot by the New York City Housing Authority (NYCHA), the site is bordered on the north and east by the NYCHA housing complex at 344 East 28th Street and is located across the street from Bellevue South Park, a 1.59-acre (0.64 ha) public park. The segment of East 27th Street between Mount Carmel Place and First Avenue on the south side of the project site is a pedestrian mall.

A total of 33 submissions were received in response to the RFP, which at the time was the most ever received by HPD for a housing project. Proposals were evaluated on criteria including design innovation, programming and affordability, financial feasibility, development experience, and the purchase price for the site. The winning proposal was submitted by a team consisting of Monadnock Development LLC, Actors Fund Housing Development Corporation, and nARCHITECTS for a nine-story development named "My Micro NY" that would have 55 micro-unit apartments, 40 percent of which would be designated as affordable housing for low- and middle-income households.

== Construction ==
Before construction could begin, the developer team and city officials needed to refine the building design, complete environmental studies, obtain public approvals (including waiving certain zoning regulations to allow for the development of the pilot project), and participate in community outreach.

Construction of the micro-unit apartments began in 2014, which were prefabricated by Capsys at the Brooklyn Navy Yard using modular units consisting of steel frames and concrete slabs; these were later transported to the project site by truck during overnight periods. On-site construction of the foundation and ground floor commenced in March 2015 and was followed by stacking of the modular units in May 2015—a process that only took three and a half weeks to complete. After the modular units were stacked and bolted together, the exterior of the building was clad with a masonry façade. At the time of completion, the building—rebranded as Carmel Place—was the tallest modular structure in Manhattan and the city's second prefabricated apartment building.

== Architecture and interior design ==
With micro-unit apartments ranging in size from 260 to 360 square feet (24 to 33 m^{2}), a key design objective for the living areas was to optimize the use of space. Some units were offered as furnished and were designed to include multifunctional furniture to transform the living space, such as a Murphy bed that pulls down over a couch and a coffee table and a desk that are both extendable into larger tables. Another design objective was to create a sense of openness so residents did not feel claustrophobic, which was accomplished through the use of 9-foot-8-inch (2.95 m) floor-to-ceiling heights and 8-foot (2.4 m) high windows with a Juliet balcony to let in light and fresh air. Storage space was also optimized through the use of a pull-out pantry in the kitchen, a pull-down closet rod near the bed (to reach clothes in higher than normal cabinets) and a storage loft above the bathroom ceiling.

Outside of the micro-unit apartments, the building contains shared common space accessible to all residents with amenities including a roof terrace with an adjoining community lounge, a fitness center, a laundry room, and a bike storage room.

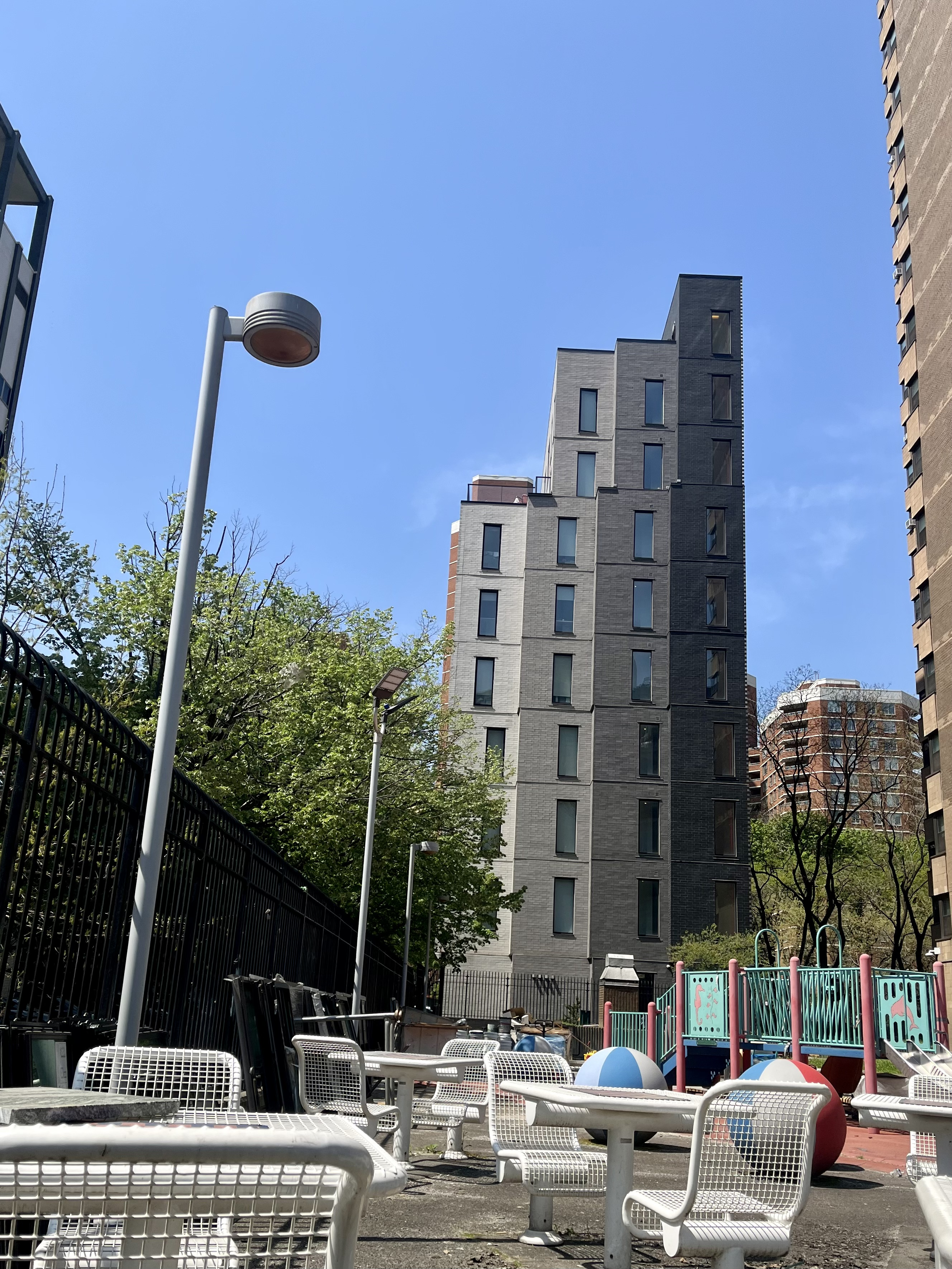
Carmel Place was designed to resemble four "mini towers"

The exterior of the building was designed to resemble four 11-foot (3.4 m) wide "mini towers" as a miniature version of the city skyline, aligning with the building's concept of micro-unit apartments. Four shades of gray bricks were used in the façade to tie in the building with the surrounding neighborhood.

== Opening and reception ==
Leasing of the apartments began in November 2015 and 90 percent of the units were rented within a span of two months; occupants for the affordable housing were selected by lottery out of a pool of 60,000 applicants. The building opened to tenants on June 1, 2016, with a total of 55 microapartments: 32 market-rate units, 14 affordable units, 8 units given to homeless veterans and 1 unit for the building's superintendent.

When Carmel Place opened, monthly rents for the market-rate micro-unit apartments were comparable to average studio apartments in Manhattan—albeit at about half the size—but the fees at Carmel Place also included additional services including Wi-Fi, cable television, weekly cleaning, and concierge services through Hello Alfred. While more expensive compared to some other housing options, the micro-unit apartments gave residents an option to live by themselves instead of needing to share an apartment with one or more roommates.

In March 2016, the New York City Council approved the Zoning for Quality and Affordability text amendment to the city's zoning resolution that allowed for micro-unit apartments to be legally constructed by reducing the minimum floor area of apartments from 400 to 300 square feet (37 to 28 m^{2}); however, there still is a limit to the density of apartments that could be constructed on a site that prevents developers from constructing a building entirely consisting of micro-unit apartments such as Carmel Place.
