= Kitchenette =

Small cooking area

A kitchenette or kitchenet is a small cooking area, which usually has a refrigerator and a microwave oven, but may have other appliances – for example a sink. They are found in studio apartments, some motel and hotel rooms, college dormitories, office buildings, furnished basements, or bedrooms in shared houses. New York City's building code defines a kitchenette as a kitchen of less than 7.4 m^{2} (80 ft^{2}) of floor space.

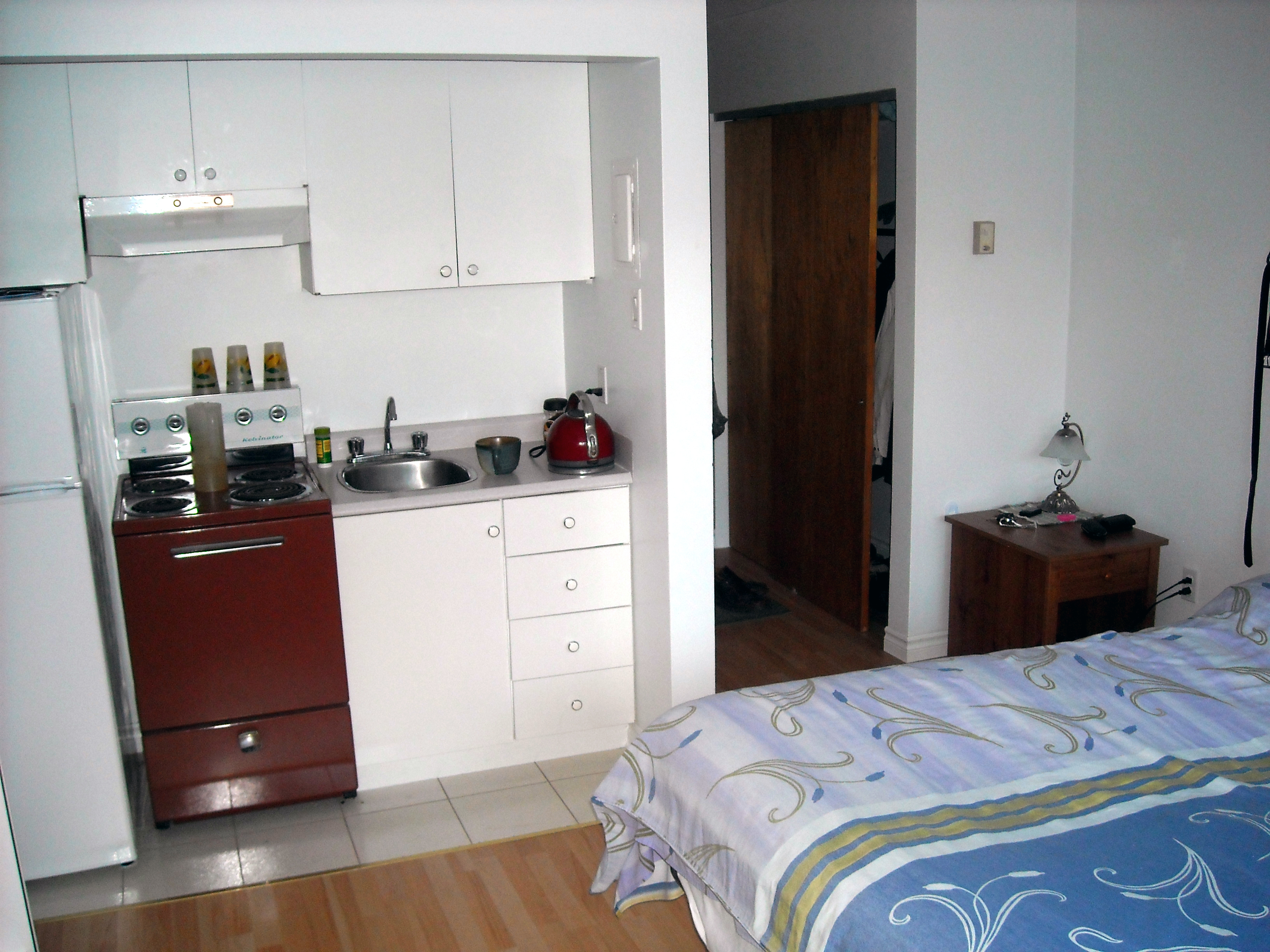
A kitchenette in a studio apartment in Sherbrooke, Quebec, Canada.

== In hotels and motels ==
Kitchenettes are a common feature in hotel and motel guest rooms and often contain a coffeemaker and a bar refrigerator, commonly called a mini-bar. Some kitchenettes have provisioned refrigerators that have an interior sensor feature used by management to monitor guest use of the refrigerator's contents and thus charge for the consumables, which typically include soda, beer, and liquor.

== In Britain ==
In British English, the term kitchenette also refers to a small secondary kitchen in a house. Often it is found on the same floor as the children's bedrooms, and used by a nanny or au pair to prepare meals for children; the same feature can be found in hotels such as some in London.

== Small apartment style ==
The word kitchenette was also used to refer to a type of small apartment prevalent in African American communities in Chicago and New York City during the mid-20th century. Landlords often divided single-family homes or large apartment units into smaller units to house more families. Living conditions in these kitchenettes were often wretched; the author Richard Wright described them as "our prison, our death sentence without a trial".

In Brazil, a kitchenette (spelled "quitinete" or "kitnet" [kitʃiˈnɛtʃi] in Brazilian Portuguese) is a small apartment with one room, one bathroom, and a kitchen which is often in the same space as the room. It corresponds to the studio apartment in American culture (or a bedsit in the UK and Ireland).
