= Bedsit =

Accommodation of a room in a shared house

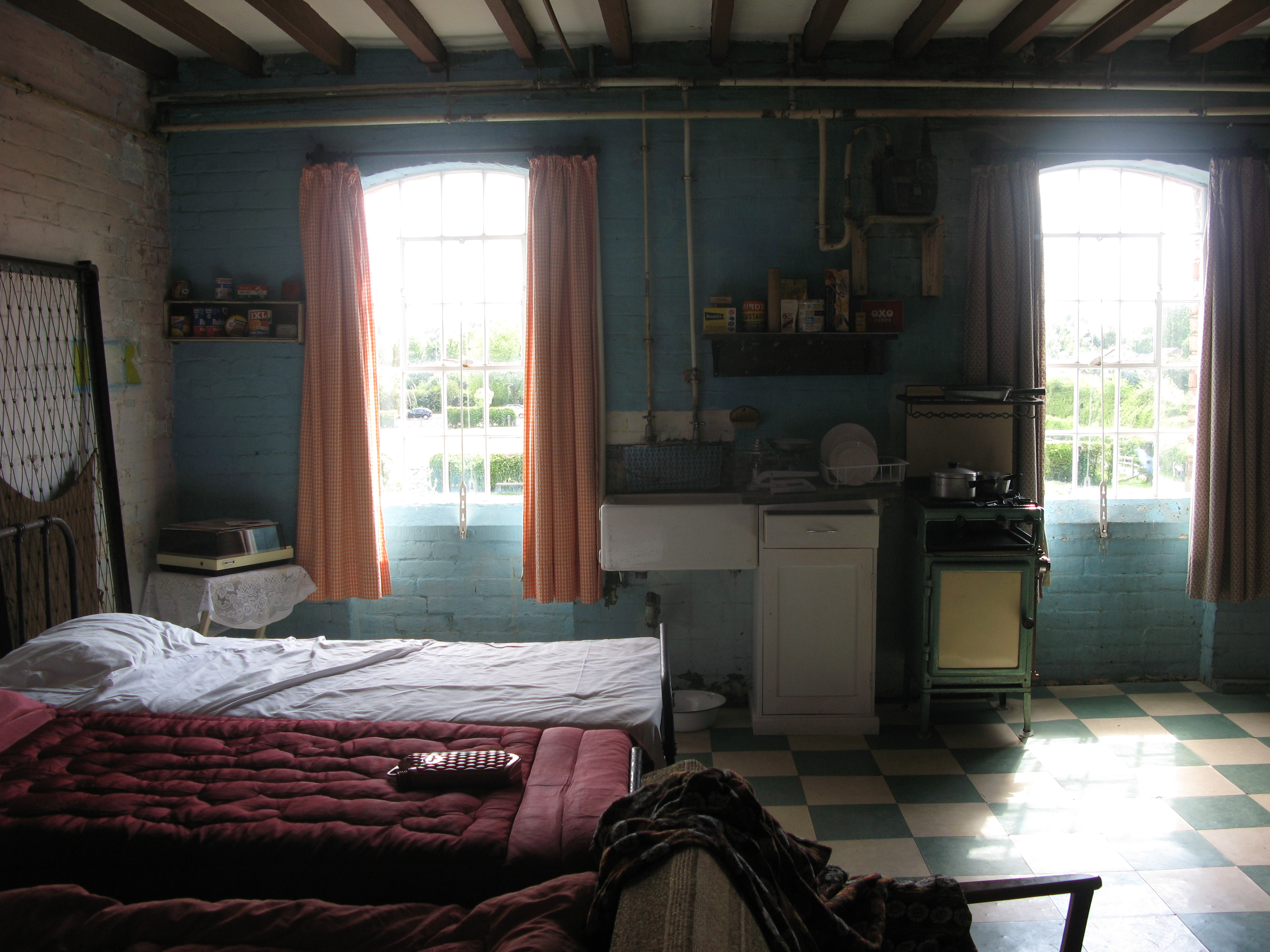
Bedsit at The Workhouse, Southwell

A bedsit, bedsitter, or bed-sitting room is a form of accommodation common in some parts of the United Kingdom which consists of a single room per occupant with all occupants typically sharing a bathroom. Bedsits are included in a legal category of dwellings referred to as houses in multiple occupation (HMO).

Bedsits arose from the subdivision of larger dwellings into low-cost accommodation at low conversion cost. In the UK, a growing desire for personal independence after World War II led to a reduced demand for traditional boarding houses with communal dining. Bedsits are often occupied by young single people, students, those unable to purchase their own properties, or those whose occupation is of a transitory nature; the cost is typically lower than for other types of property. Someone whose employment is a long distance from their home may sometimes rent a bedsit to reduce the cost and inconvenience of daily travel.

== Other countries ==
The American and Canadian equivalents to a bedsit are rooming houses and single room occupancy (SRO); however, in Canada those differ from bedsits in that rooming houses and SRO hotels generally do not provide tenants with private kitchen or bathing facilities; instead, those facilities are shared. True bedsits are rare in Canada but are found in some Atlantic regions, such as the city of St. John's.

In the United States, single room apartments are typically called a studio apartment, or when slightly smaller an efficiency apartment, also known simply as an efficiency.

The Australian equivalent to bedsit was called a flatette. Studio apartment is now the common term, with these typically including a small combined toilet and bathroom.

A bedsit can also be compared to a Soviet communal apartment, in which a common kitchen, bathroom, toilet, and telephone are shared by several families, each of which lives in a single room opening up onto a common hallway.

In Nigeria, an analogue to a bedsit is a face-to-face apartment building, where a group of one- or two-room apartments have entrances facing each other along a walkway leading to the main entrance of the building in which the apartments are located. The apartments, which often have shared bathrooms and kitchen spaces, are low-rent and are commonly used by low-income residents because of their affordability.

Bedsits were once common in Dublin and other towns in Ireland, although they had been impractical to implement after the introduction of planning permission in 1963. Bedsits were banned in 2008 by the Housing (Standards for Rented Houses) Regulations 2008, with a phase-out date of February 2013. The Health Service Executive and approved housing bodies can still offer equivalent accommodation, which is mostly used as emergency accommodation for the homeless. In 2013, regulations came into force in Ireland, under which landlords were obliged to provide each tenant with a separate bathroom, a four-ring cooker, and access to laundry facilities and other basic facilities, or risk being fined up to €5,000. Bedsits have since been outlawed in the Republic.

== References in popular culture ==
Much of the action described in Quentin Crisp's 1968 autobiography, The Naked Civil Servant, takes place in a London bedsit. Bedsit Disco Queen: How I Grew Up and Tried to Be a Pop Star was also the title of Tracy Thorn's autobiography.

=== Music ===
Bedsits are often associated with poor people, and are mentioned in this way in "Late Lament" by The Moody Blues: "Bedsitter people look back and lament/another day's useless energy spent". Justin Hayward, the song's composer and singer, wrote it in his own bed-sit at the age of 19, although the quoted line was penned by the band's drummer, Graeme Edge. The song "Solitary Confinement" from the Members album At the Chelsea Nightclub, paints a grim picture of life in a bedsit room, portraying the life of a loner who has moved to the city, and spends all their time at work or at home watching television, and "eat(s) out of tins". The song likens the protagonist's existence to that of a prisoner locked in solitary confinement. Scottish folk-rock singer Al Stewart's debut album is titled Bedsitter Images. In "I Fought in a War" by Scottish indie band Belle and Sebastian, mention is made of the "bedsit infamy of the decade gone before". The subject is also referenced for a similar purpose in "Legend in My Living Room" by Annie Lennox ["...Bright lights and trains and bedsit stains"] as well as the Soft Cell song "Bedsitter", about club life. David Bowie in "Song for Bob Dylan" from Hunky Dory (1971) sings: "You gave your heart to every bedsit room". The Clash song "Capitol Radio" remarks "phone in from your bedsit room". Nick Cave and the Bad Seeds refer to a bedsit in their 2024 song "Wild God" from the album of the same name, with the lyric: "He went searching for the girl down on Jubilee Street. But she’d died in a bedsit in 1993." Glass Animals' frontman Dave Bayley wrote "six kids stuck in a bedsit" in "The Other Side of Paradise" from How to Be a Human Being. The basketball side of the song was inspired by the documentary film Hoop Dreams.

=== Comedy and drama ===
- Harold Pinter's play The Room (1957) is a "kitchen sink" drama evoking the squalor and social depression of the bed-sitting room culture of the time.
- British comedian Tony Hancock was the performer of the sole character in "The Bedsitter" (Hancock 1961) by Ray Galton and Alan Simpson for the BBC, a depiction of the boredom of bedsit existence.
- The Bed-Sitting Room (1963) is a satirical play by Spike Milligan and John Antrobus about the aftermath of World War III, later made into a film released in 1969. In it, one of the characters, Lord Fortnum, mutates into the aforementioned humble dwelling after expressing fear of this surrealist eventuality.
- The Bed-Sit Girl is a sitcom created and written by Ronald Chesney and Ronald Wolfe as a vehicle for Sheila Hancock, who played the lead role of Sheila Ross, a typist and was about her life and relationships living in a bedsit in the mid 1960s London. Its broadcast run of twelve episodes over two series from 1964-65 are now missing and believed to be lost.
- The 1970s British sitcom Rising Damp was set in a house converted into bedsits, with the landlord Rupert Rigsby played by Leonard Rossiter.
- The British sitcom Dear John by John Sullivan had his main character, John Lacey played by Ralph Bates, lives in a bedsit after his divorce.
- In 2016 Katharine Whitehorn's book Cooking in a Bedsitter was adopted as a radio sitcom for BBC Radio 4.

== See also ==
- Apartment
- Chambre de bonne, a similar form of accommodation in France
- Communal apartment
- Garret, a low-rent attic room
- Microapartment
- Studio apartment
