= Solo living =

Domestic situation of individuals who live alone

Solo living refers to the domestic situation of individuals who live alone. This has received attention from behavioral experts and researchers, in regard to how to help address the personal needs of such individuals, and to provide them with resources which can be beneficial. Various published articles address practical advice and methods for individuals who live alone, to help them find beneficial ways for improving various parts of daily life.

== See also ==
- Ethnomethodology
- Simple living
