= Student and university culture in South Korea =

University culture in South Korea was formed in the tumultuous social milieu of nearly four decades-long autocratic rule. University students found their identity through organizing and spearheading anti-corruption and anti-dictatorship mass protests such as the 1960 April Revolution, the 1979 Bu-Ma Democratic Protests, the 1980 Gwangju Uprising, and the 1987 June Struggle. Despite government crackdown, student activities promoting free exchange of ideas and free expression continued on university campuses in the form of student clubs. Big-character posters, historically used to publicly demonstrate opposition to military dictatorship, are a lasting tradition that can be seen on university walls to this day. Such student club culture and the activities remain the linchpin of university life.

Residential life at South Korean universities can be largely categorized into university dormitories, near-campus housing, and commuting from home. University students in South Korea are not required to live in dormitories. Dormitories are rather reserved for students who do not live within commutable distances. If the number of eligible students exceeds dorm capacity, space is allocated based on academic performance. Most university dorms in South Korea are segregated by sex and subject to curfews. A significant number of students live alone in studios near university campuses, or a communal form of housing called hasukjib, which has been featured in multiple K-dramas.

Drinking has evolved to become one of the major subcultures on university campuses in South Korea. Because Korea's Youth Protection Act defines drinking age as January 1 of the year one turns 19 (not one's birthday), being able to drink is a common denominator over which first-year university students form friendships. However, excessive drinking during university events has frequently resulted in the death of one or more students. In the wake of a series of alcohol-related accidents in the early 2010s, a national assemblyman proposed a bill that would ban possession of alcohol on university campuses but it never became law after having garnered both huge support and backlash from civil society.

There is disproportionate attention to universities located within the Seoul capital area, which often becomes the focal point of criticism that it fuels elitism.

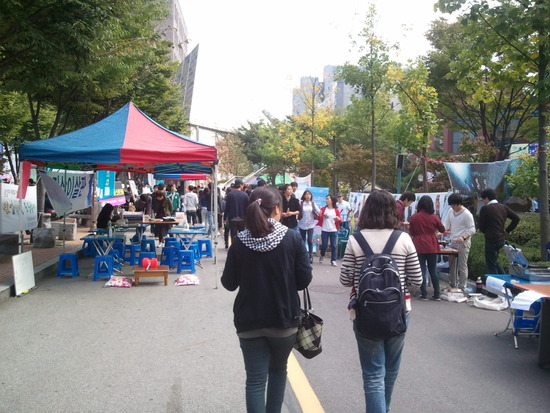
Soongsil University Festival (Daedongje) 2010-10-06 12h25m

== Historical background ==
Universities in South Korea go as far back as 1398 ACE when Sungkyunkwan was founded as the highest educational institute of the Joseon dynasty. However, Keijō Imperial University, the predecessor of Seoul National University, established in 1924 by the Japanese Empire, marks the beginning of higher education in South Korea that agrees with the modern definition of a university. The Korean people under the Japanese rule had attempted to erect universities independently but failed to obtain official status due to the Governor-General of Chōsen's refusal to issue permits. Despite the predicament, many colleges established independently of Japanese influence during the movement obtained official university status after Korea reclaimed independence in 1945.

During military dictatorship between 1960 and 1987, university students stood at the forefront of anti-dictatorship protests, oftentimes organizing mass demonstrations themselves. The April Revolution in 1960 was the first successful student-led democratization movement in South Korea that ousted President Syngman Rhee, which catapulted university students to the drivers of social change. However, Park Chunghee rose to power through a military coup in the following year, declaring a new constitution and establishing the Second Republic. Park's declaration of martial law and pushing through a constitutional amendment in 1972, which granted the president sweeping executive and legislative powers, sparked swift backlash within the student civil society. Although Park had been successful in suppressing mass demonstrations organized by university students, buoyed by the popularity in his early years, demonstrations against Park's regime eventually began to erupt nationwide as Park's popularity started to dwindle. While it was not the student-led mass protests that brought about the fall of President Park, it is generally believed that the student society across universities fostered an environment in which Park's authoritarian reign could not last.

After Park's assassination in 1979, Chun Doo-hwan, the then-army general, orchestrated yet another military coup, usurping power and quashing hopes of democratization. Chun's coup spurred civil unrest throughout the country, leading up to the anti-martial law demonstration in May 1980, coordinated by 35 universities in Seoul and an additional 24 universities outside Seoul where between 70,000 and 100,000 university students took to the open square of Seoul Station. After a series of failed protests led by university student union, the June Democratic Uprising, prompted by the death of Bak Jong-cheol, the then-president of Seoul National University's student council and a prodemocracy activist, forced Chun to step down and compelled party leaders, both ruling and opposition, to hold a referendum on a constitutional amendment, which vastly reduced presidential powers, codified direct presidential elections, and strengthened civil rights.

=== Big-character posters ===
Big-character posters are an important form of expressing opinions in public areas, usually on university campuses. They mostly come in A0, the biggest of the international A series papers, called jeonji (Korean: 전지) in Korean.

Big-character posters have been heavily deployed by university students throughout the modern history of South Korea as a means of railing against dictatorship and government censorship. Authors may sign their posters to claim ownership of the expressed opinion, but signature is not required and authors may remain anonymous. It is conventional for the author to voluntarily put up the poster and to remove it by a self-assigned deadline, which is oftentimes announced in the same poster.

At times of economic and social distress, university walls near commonly used walking trails functioned as public agoras. University wall posters played a big role in the aftermath of the 2013 railroad strike in South Korea when a Korea University student wrote a satirical poster that started off by asking everyone's well-being as a rallying call, urging the public to realize how unacceptable the political state was. It was received by the student society across universities as a wake-up call, and set off a chain reaction, where more than 40 posters were subsequently put up side by side in response.

The university poster culture peaked again during President Park Geun-hye's term when Park and her administration were implicated in a string of corruption scandals, which generated public fury. In the wake of 2014 capsizing of the Sewol ferry, Park's administration attempted to silence public outcry on social media by creating a task force charged with monitoring and prosecuting online critics using Korea's defamation law. In October 2015, the Park administration announced a plan to force all middle and high schools in South Korea to use state-issued history textbook, which reminded her critics of her father Park Chung-hee's authoritarian rule. Two months later in December 2015, Park struck a deal with Japanese Prime Minister Shinzo Abe to resolve the comfort women issue "irreversibly," despite widespread public opposition in South Korea. The national furor culminated when several news media exposed Park's inappropriate relationship with her confidante, Choi Soon-sil. South Korean university students, in the midst of political turmoil, voiced concerns and channeled their anger on university walls, openly denouncing President Park and her top aide, Choi Soon-sil, while calling for Park's resignation. Ewha Womans University, where Choi's daughter, Chung Yoo-ra, attended, was accused of changing the admission rules to give Chung an unfair advantage, a favor Park returned by showering a professor at Ewha Womans University with research grant of approximately ₩5.5 billion (about $4.4 million) in total. Subsequently, Ewha Womans University saw their walls filling up with big-character posters, expressing humiliation of being affiliated with the university and criticizing the cozy relationship between the university and the Park administration.

== Student organizations ==
Arguably, the two main pillars of autonomous student organizations at any given university are the student council and student clubs. The student council represents the entire student body and engages in negotiations with university leadership. The student council has a hierarchical structure, with the general council at the top and an autonomous council within each constituent college. An event that is referred to as "student-organized" or "student-led" is by definition organized or hosted by one of these student councils, either at the university level or a college level.

Enduring oppressive rule in the 1970s and the 1980s, student councils developed tactics to circumvent government censorship and surveillance, and cultivate the next generation of prodemocracy activists. University student councils would organize seemingly nonpolitical events such as freshmen welcoming party or annual picnics, which served as an instrument with which upperclassmen informed freshmen about the cruelty of military dictatorship. University students would circulate books in student clubs that are deemed by authoritarian regimes as "propagating impure and corrupt ideologies," going beyond the proclaimed objectives at the time of formation.

Since the democratization in the late 1980s and early 1990s, the scope of club activities has pivoted from activism to a broader array of topics, including entertainment, sports, career development, religious activities, and extracurricular learning. There is a terminological distinction between entertainment-focused circles, called dong'ari (Korean: 동아리), and student clubs specifically organized to study topics that are rarely covered in regular curriculums, called hakhoe (Korean: 학회). University students in South Korea are able to meet a variety of people from different backgrounds in these extracurricular settings as club membership is not limited to a single academic department. Furthermore, registered student organizations are allocated space within university buildings to facilitate and support meeting. Club members are generally free to visit the space between classes, which often becomes the breeding ground for social relationships. Club activities have been reported to have a positive effect on university students' overall satisfaction.

In recent years, student organizations have seen a steep decline in participation rate due to cutthroat job market and high unemployment rates. South Korea has seen a fourfold increase in the number of college graduates over the past two decades as education is viewed as the ticket to higher socioeconomic status. Exacerbated by slowing economic growth and aging population, university students are increasingly shunning extracurricular activities unrelated to employment competitiveness. Some attribute the decline to growing individualism in the younger generation, culturally rejecting social mingling.

== Residential life ==
According to Statistics Korea, there were 2.54 million university students in South Korea in 2021. Approximately, 560 thousand of those were located in Seoul, roughly 22 percent of the entire student population. University residential life consists of roughly four categories: one rooms (Korean: 원룸), which are equivalent to studios, hasukjib, gosiwon, and dormitories. Universities do not report annual breakdown of housing forms among university students but Statistics Korea does report university dormitory accommodation capacity, which has steadily been in the neighborhood of 23 percent since 2019, a marginal increase from previous years. When limited to Seoul, the nation's capital, due to the scarcity of land and space, universities have dorm accommodation rate less than the national average, roughly around 15 percent.

Within the Seoul capital area, public transportation is the single most dominant mode of commute. In a 2014 poll, 82.3 percent of university students responded they commute via public transportation, including Seoul buses and the metropolitan subway system. The average commute time topped 135 minutes a day roundtrip. Those who live outside Seoul proper have been estimated to spend roughly 30 more minutes on commute every day than those who do. In extreme cases, commute time can even reach 4 hours a day. Universities generally exclude students in the capital area from dorm eligibility, and these students are forced to either find off-campus housing or endure long commutes.

Korea does not have roommate culture, where several people live together to split the rent and share public space while each occupying a room. The monthly rent for Seoul studios off campus exceeded ₩500,000 (around US$400) in March 2022 for 33 m^{2} net leasable area with a security deposit of ₩10 million (or a little over US$8,000).

== Leisure and entertainment ==
=== Orientation ===
Student orientation, often pronounced oh-tee (Korean: 오티) as a loanword and also often translated to sae-teo (Korean: 새터), marks the beginning of one's university life. Designed as a welcoming event for freshmen, student orientation serves as a place to provide information about university life and opportunity to make friends.

South Korea's academic year starts in March, but a number of university events, including the student orientation, take place in February before the spring semester officially starts. During the orientation, upperclassmen and new students introduce themselves, exchange phone numbers, and make plans to get to know each other by having lunch together between classes, drinking in groups, or both.

Orientations span two to three days. The university's student council usually rents a resort large enough to accommodate all students. The run of show may vary by university. However, it can be loosely summarized as introducing the university system and campus life, and group activities with and without alcohol, which often continue overnight.

=== Membership Training ===
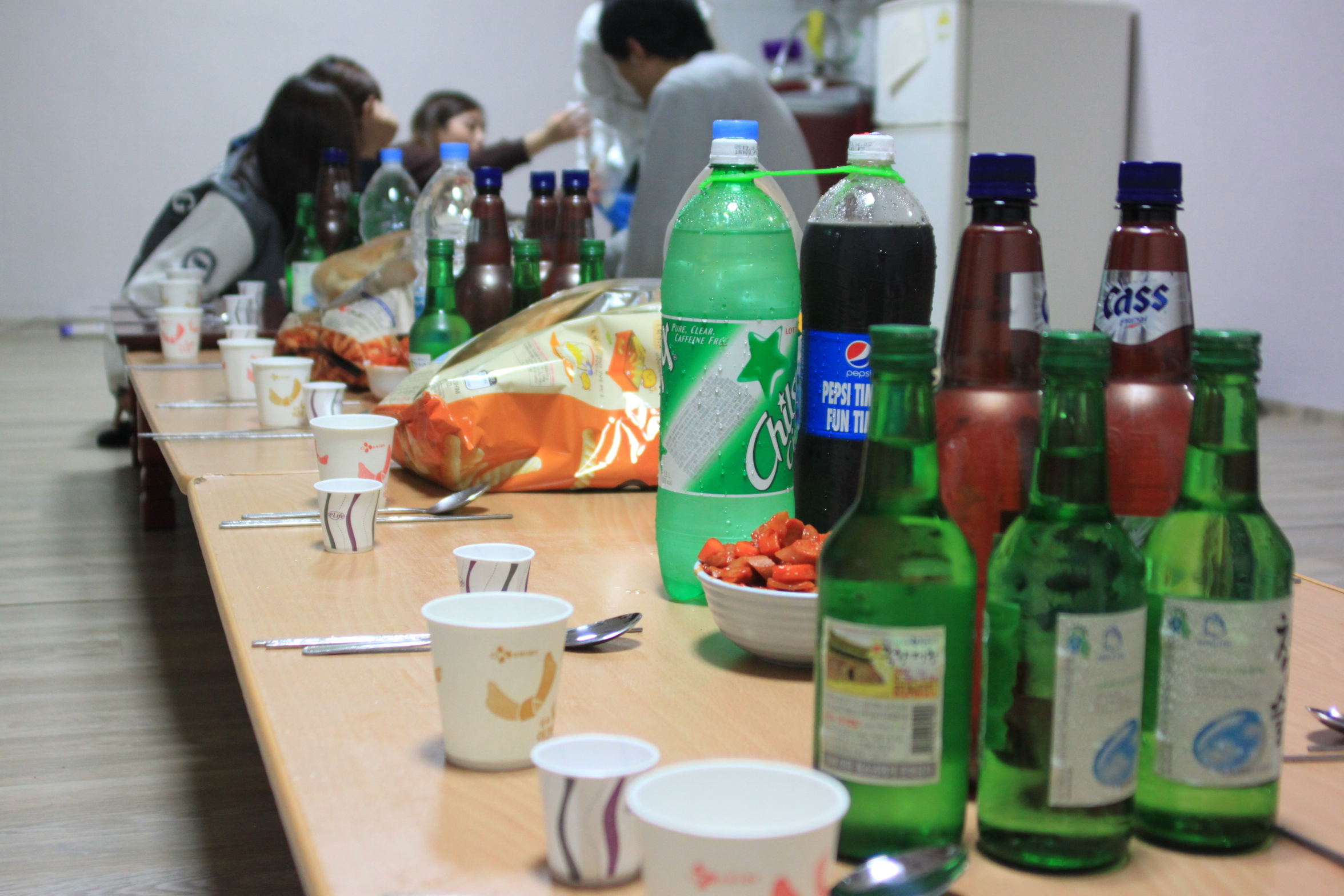
Membership training

Membership training, at Korean universities, refers to an excursion to a nearby less urbanized town for entertainment. These trips are typically organized for members within the same college or within a student club. The term, membership training, is of an unknown origin, although there is a history of companies' calling team-building workshops membership trainings, where new recruits are sent off to a remote facility to spend time together and develop a sense of membership. As membership training is not an official event and therefore does not exist on the academic calendar, there is no established time when it has to happen. However, the first flurry of student outing events happen in the spring around April, about a month after the spring semester starts. Membership trainings can last for any number of days from one to three, depending on the organizers and the occasion.

- Major locations of MT
- West of Seoul - Youngjong Island, Eulwangni Beach, Ganghwa Island
- East of Seoul - Gapyeong-gun, Gangchon station, Imjingak in Paju, Pocheon, Gwacheon Cheonggye mountain, Daeseongni station
- East of Gyeonggi province - Anmyeon Island of Chungcheong province, Daecheon, Daebu Island and Jebu Island, Yongin Gogiri valley / Everland theme park
- Gangwon province - Gangneung, Sokcho (valleys in Yanggu-gun, Inje-gun, Hongcheon-gun)
- Jeolla province (including Gwangju) - Jangsu-gun of Namwon, Gurye-gun, Damyang-gun, South coast
- Jeju Island
- Gyeongsang Province - Daegu, Pohang, Youngdeok-gun, Uljin-gun, Busan, Songjeong beach, Yangsan, Geoje Island

=== Festivals ===
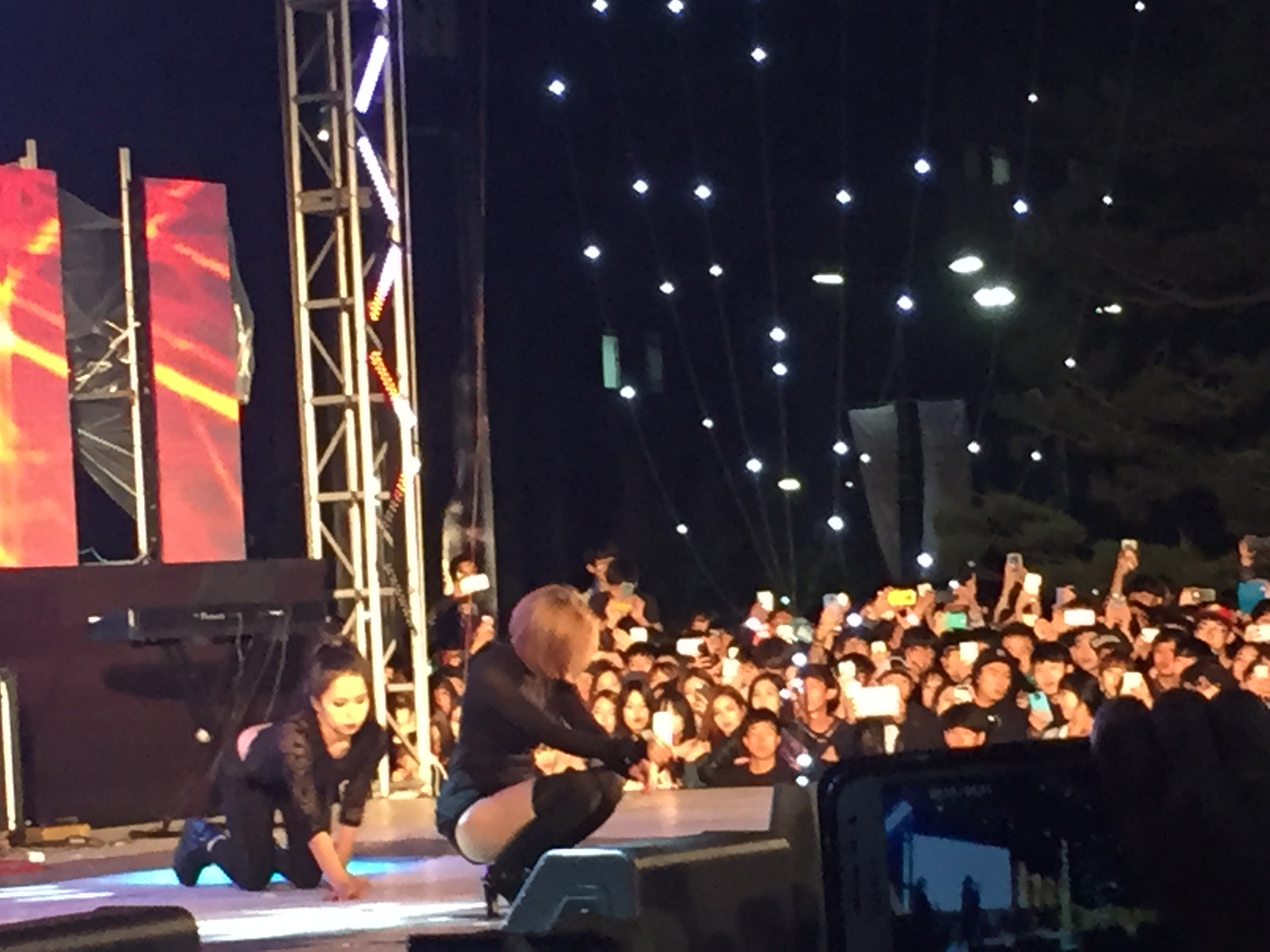
Main big festival

When it comes to 'Campus Romance', we can come up with festival. Festivals are named differently, depending on the university's character. Mostly it means all the students get together and have fun. The festival consists of many performances, exhibitions or flea markets.

The university festival's history dates back to 600 years ago. There were festivals in 'Sungkyunkwan' which was the only national university in the Joseon Dynasty period. At that time, Sungkyunkwan's dormitory was opened and they permitted outsiders to come inside. Not only the students but also their parents, friends, and even relatives could participate in the festival and enjoy the many games and events.

In the 1970s 'Mask dance', which is part of Korean traditional culture, was popular. Mask dance, Korean wrestling, and tug-of-war were the main events at university festivals. Also, traditional Korean performances or singing performances for political action had a role in the festival to criticize and satirize politics.

In the 1980s, communal and cultural events like traditional performances, mask dance and tug-of-war were held at the festival called Daedongje which means 'become all-together'. Many academic seminars, mock trials and debates were also held. However, these festivals were sometimes delayed because of frequent demonstrations.

In the 1990s, many traditional and political things had disappeared from the festival. The events at the festivals had started consisting of celebrity invitation performances, bars, flea markets and so on. The culture started putting more importance on personality and diversity than on the value of community.

In the 2000s, most university festivals consist of many celebrity performances like Psy, Dynamic Duo, and IU. There are also a lot of bars set up by the students themselves. Not only the school's students but all university students in Korea can participate in and enjoy the festival. At night, some universities invite a club DJ and hold a DJ party.

Normally, the university festivals are held in May for 3 days with many events.

There are department-level festivals organized, separately organized by the corresponding department's student council. These festivals usually take place in the spring, and include an array of events such as student-run makeshift pubs set up as booths in an open area on campus, quiz games, and photo exhibitions.

Student dormitories also host student festivals. Gwanaksa, the Seoul National University dormitory, hosts the Hanul Festival at the beginning of each fall semester.

== University Students Learning English ==
Korea and other Asian countries teach English from a young age with the exception of the English ban in 2018 for first and second graders, by the time Korean students graduate high school and are on their way to Universities, Korean students have a vocabulary of about 3,000+ words. In Korean Higher education, English is sometimes a required subject, and many schools require a level of English proficiency or high TOEFL scores for graduation. Korean students looking at the future and jobs outside of universities, proficiency in English in Korea has a high impact on employment, with two-thirds of Koreans proficient in English saying language skills opened up more employment opportunities. Although, currently, Korea is Ranked 37 out of 112 countries in English proficiency according to Education First; Data from the average TOEFL test score has dropped for Koreans, whereas it has improved in other Asian countries like Japan and China since 2013. Difficulties University students have consist of many variables; cultural differences, syntax, and pronunciation are challenging not only for students but Korean adults.

Study Abroad.

Korean students study abroad for certificates in English which could subsequently give them an advantage when applying for a job. Preparation for study abroad programs include taking TOEFL or the International English Language Testing System (IELTS) for admission, some American universities even require SAT. Korean students that have been successful with a study abroad program claimed to help students culturally and professionally; 87% of those who studied in English-speaking countries would recommend it to others for the purpose of exposure to unique cultural experiences.

Materials and Methods

The methodology consists of a majority of textbook learning with an emphasis on grammar learning and test prep, preparing for TOEFL or TOEIC English proficiency exams. Rote memorization plays a large role in language learning in Korea, but Output based skills i.e. speaking, have increased with the end goal of conversational English fluency. English is also on radio programs, educational television programs, English newspapers, and streaming sites

Materials consist of TOEFL and TOEIC proficiency exams, English grammar textbooks, and test prep books.

== Controversy ==
Many accidents occur during student orientation.

In 2014, nine people were reported dead after a collapsed roof trapped dozens of people at a South Korean university orientation. More than 70 students were injured following the roof collapse.

In 2015, a first-year female university student fell unconscious after drinking alcohol during a school-organised orientation event for newly enrolled students. She was immediately taken to a nearby hospital, but she remained unconscious.

A bus driver died and 44 students were injured following a bus collapse in 2017. The bus was heading to Wonju for a school orientation.
