= Secret (2007 film) =

2007 Taiwanese-Hong Kong film by Jay Chou

- Promotional poster for Secret
- Directed by: Jay Chou
- Written by: Jay Chou; Christine To
- Produced by: J.R. Yang; William Kong
- Starring: Jay Chou; Gwei Lun-mei; Anthony Wong
- Cinematography: Mark Lee Ping-bing
- Edited by: Cheung Ka-fai
- Music by: Jay Chou; Terdsak Janpan
- Distributed by: Sony Pictures Taiwan; Edko Film
- Release date: 27 July 2007 (Taiwan)
- Running time: 101 minutes
- Countries: Taiwan; Hong Kong
- Language: Mandarin
- Box office: US$9 million

Secret (traditional Chinese: 不能說的·秘密; simplified Chinese: 不能说的·秘密; pinyin: Bùnéng shuō de·mìmì; lit. 'The Secret That Cannot Be Told') is a 2007 musical romantic film. A Taiwanese-Hong Kong co-production, it is the directorial debut feature film of Taiwanese musician Jay Chou, who also stars as the male lead and co-wrote the film. In addition to himself, the film also stars Gwei Lun-mei and Anthony Wong. Filming was conducted at Tamkang High School, New Taipei City, Taiwan, which is also the alma mater of Jay Chou. The budget was about NT$65 million.

In 2007, it received six nominations at the 44th Golden Horse Awards and won Outstanding Taiwanese Film of the Year, Best Original Song for "Secret" ("不能說的祕密") and Best Visual Effects. It was also nominated for Best Asian Film at the 27th Hong Kong Film Awards in 2008. In 2016, an adapted brand new stage musical with same name was jointly produced by US Broadway and China Broadway.

== Plot ==
Piano prodigy Ye Xianglun (Jay Chou) lives with his father (Anthony Wong Chau-sang). In 1999, Xianglun transfers into the famous music school, Tamkang (Danjiang) Secondary School, where his father is a teacher. His classmate Qingyi (Alice Tzeng) gives him a campus tour, noting that the piano building will be torn down on graduation day. In the building, he hears a beautiful, mysterious melody ("Secret"), leading him to Lu Xiaoyu (Gwei Lun-mei), another piano student. After class, Xianglun asks Xiaoyu about the song; she tells him it is a secret that cannot be told.

Xianglun and Xiaoyu spend time together in the practice rooms or around town. They share their first kiss after he gives her a rare music score that he won for her at a school piano battle. When Xianglun tells Xiaoyu about the demolition of the piano building on graduation day, she plays him the mysterious song "Secret", telling him never to play it on the piano room's oldest piano. Xiaoyu then suddenly disappears and skips class for days. Xiaoyu also begins to develop an undercurrent of jealousy as Qingyi tries to get closer with Xianglun.

In class a few days later, Xianglun passes a note to Xiaoyu asking her to meet him at the practice rooms. However, Qingyi shows up instead, and Xianglun accidentally kisses her since his eyes are closed. He realizes his mistake when the janitor loudly says hello to Xiaoyu outside the door; Xianglun rushes out, but she is already out of sight. He goes to Xiaoyu's home to clear things up, but her mother says she is sick and had dropped out of school a long time ago. She tells Xianglun not to look for her daughter again.

Five months later, graduation day had arrived, with Xianglun set to perform on stage at the graduation ceremony. Qingyi lends him her bracelet to wish him luck. Halfway through the performance, Xianglun sees Xiaoyu by the door, and they share a smile before she quickly leaves. Xianglun abandons the performance and runs outside, chasing down Xiaoyu and embracing her, telling her to wait for him. However, before he goes back, she sees Qingyi's bracelet on his wrist.

When Xianglun goes looking for Xiaoyu after the ceremony a few minutes later, he cannot find her anywhere. Upon asking a few classmates if they had seen the girl he was always with, they are confused and reply that he was always alone. Xianglun begins to have flashbacks to all the times they hung out together, but in those memories, she is missing and he is alone. Desperate for answers, he races to Xiaoyu's house. She is missing, but Xiaoyu's mother gives him a photo of Xiaoyu with his father.

Xianglun rushes home and asks his father about her. The film cuts to a scene with Xiaoyu, in 1979 (20 years ago), speaking with Xianglun's father (her teacher at the time, at the same school). She confesses that she had found a score hidden in the oldest piano on campus, called "Secret", and when she played it on the piano, she had traveled forward in time 20 years and met Xianglun. However, she explains that during her time travels, she can only be seen by the first person she sees, and she doesn't always succeed in seeing Xianglun first, so it appears as though she is missing most days. However, she is now depressed since she had caught him kissing another girl, then saw that girl's bracelet on his wrist. Since she never wants to see him again, she gives the score of "Secret" to Xianglun's father.

Naturally, Xianglun's father thinks the story is ridiculous, and believes she is suffering from some mental illness. Xianglun's father shares her story with the classroom leader who leaks it to her fellow classmates of 1979, as well as Xiaoyu's mother.

Back in the present, Xianglun realizes that the music piece that she showed him was "Secret", and could take the pianist into the past or future if played at the right speed, on the old piano. He rushes off to the piano building, which is about to be torn down. At the same time, Xianglun's father retrieves the manuscript of "Secret" that Xiaoyu had given to him for safekeeping, and realizes that Xiaoyu had written a message (20 years ago) to Xianglun on the back, corroborating her stories of time travel. Meanwhile, Xianglun enters the piano room and, as the demolition begins, starts to play "Secret" from memory, remembering Xiaoyu's words, "I always play it fast when I want to go back". He continues playing as the building crashes down around him; just before he is smashed by a wrecking ball, he plays the last note.

The scene cuts to outside the classroom. Xianglun peeks inside, and Xiaoyu looks back at him and smiles. The last scene shows the 1979 graduation photo of Tamkang (Danjiang) Secondary School, with Xianglun and Xiaoyu standing next to each other.

== Cast ==
- Jay Chou as Ye Xianglun, male lead, a music student majoring in piano and lives with his father.
- Gwei Lun-mei as Lu Xiaoyu, female lead, a music student who lives with her mother.
- Anthony Wong as Xianglun's father, the discipline teacher at his school.
- Alice Tzeng as Qingyi, Xianglun's classmate who is secretly in love with him.
- Devon Song as Abao, Xianglun's friend and member of the rugby team, often seen together with Alang.
- Huang Junlang as Alang, Xianglun's friend and captain of the rugby team, often seen together with Abao.
- Yuhao Zhan as Yu Hao, a music student and talented piano player, nicknamed "Prince of the piano". He has a "piano battle" with Xianglun.
- Huang Xin-yu as Xue Gao.
- Funky Tu as Ta-yung
- Chase Chang as Record store owner
- Gary Yang as Ye Xianglun's classmate
- Aviis Zhong as Hsiao-hua

== Production ==
The film tells a "simple but very beautiful" love story, which Chou denies was adapted from his personal experiences. When the film debuted, Chou admitted that he drew from childhood experience for the plot, although his personal story was not as romantic.

Filming began in January 2007 and was completed in March. Despite previous experience in filming music videos, Chou admits that films are much more challenging due to storyline complexity and time constraints.

Because Chou was worried that people might question if he actually directed the film himself, he even refused veteran director Andrew Lau Wai Keung to visit him during shooting. However, Chou says that he did send a pilot film to Lau afterwards.

Chou has announced his plans to direct a sequel to the film and plans to invite Andy Lau to star in it.

=== Tribute ===
Chou added elements to the film to pay tribute to his high school and his favorite composer, Frédéric Chopin.

- 淡江中學 (Tamkang (Danjiang) High School)
  - 2007 marks the 10th year he graduated from his alma mater.
  - In the film, he incorporated elements which reflected his actual experience in school, such as his stint as pianist for the school choir.
  - In the film, he was the orchestra's pianist and played during high school graduation.
  - The date when Xiaoyu first goes to class is 18 January 1979 – which is Jay Chou's birth-date.
  - The students on duty were Vincent Fang and Alang Huang, both lyricists who often work with him.
- Chopin:
  - One of Chopin's waltzes, the Farewell Waltz, plays in the background briefly at the beginning of the film.
  - Right at the beginning of the film, a lesson about Chopin is being taught in class. He is described as a gifted musician and composer.
  - There are two paintings in the music room that are supposedly Chopin and his beloved (George Sand). The conversation between Xianglun and Xiaoyu is about Chopin and his lover. Xianglun laments that the two eventually parted ways. However, Xiaoyu seems envious that the couple was able to spend 10 years together.
  - Chopin's Waltz (Op. 64 No. 2 in C♯ minor) and "Black Key" Etude (Op. 10 No. 5 in G♭ major) feature in the piano duel scene. Note that the melodic sequence of the "Black Key" Etude that is performed in the film includes both the introductory black key sequence, as well as an improvisation in which the introductory theme of the etude is transposed a half step higher and is played almost entirely on the white keys.
  - In the middle of the film, just before Xiaoyu talks about the relationship between Chopin and Sand, Xianglun plays an excerpt from Chopin's posthumous Nocturne No. 21 in C minor.

== Plot analysis ==
=== Time travel ===
According to the instructions written in the piano score, there are three conditions involved in the Time travel:

1. Follow the notes upon the journey. The person needs to play the melodies in the piano score so they could time travel.
2. At first sight marks one's destiny. The first person that the time traveler sees will be the only person that could see the time traveler.
  (Meaning that a different person could see the time traveler every time they travel through time. In the film, Xiaoyu explained the "just one time" rule by saying: "But it's not smooth every time.", pertaining to the fact that there were times that she saw other people instead of Xianglun.)
3. Return lies within hasty keys. The melody had two versions: lento and allegro. Allegro is played to travel back to the past (20 years ago) while the lento version is played to travel to the future. In the film, Xiaoyu explained that she needed to play the song faster when she returns to the past.

In addition, other conditions are implied:

1. There is a time difference when playing the piano score. It will not affect everything immediately. This is different from "Butterfly effect". The time concept used here is similar to the movie "Back to the Future". That means the past and the present time is paralleled. If we want to change the present, we need someone to return to the parallel time-space line to change the past objects to affect the present time and space. But when the people travel to the future, they have no effect on time and space.
2. The melody is used in the antique piano room only, or effective only on the antique piano where the word "secret" is printed. Therefore, Xiaoyu did not return to the past when she taught Xianglun "Secret" because they were in a different room and was using a different piano.
  Note: The movie does not reveal why the antique piano and the piano score contained the magic of time-travel.

The conditions of the piano score were rationalised in the following scenarios:

1. "At first sight marks one's destiny." When Xiaoyu first finished playing "Secret", Xianglun was the first person she saw, and only he could see her within that time-travel. This was explained already in the movie.
2. Because of the rule above, Xiaoyu kept her eyes closed after she travelled to the future, counted 108 steps from the antique piano room to Xianglun's classroom, and only opened her eyes in front of the door where she can see Xianglun.
3. On the day of the "piano fight", Xiaoyu accidentally saw Qingyi first, therefore the two girls were able to chat in the crowd. But Xianglun had no way to see that Qingyi was talking with someone in the crowd.
4. When Xiaoyu and Xianglun first went to the roof of her house, a woman who was wearing red clothes was standing behind the windows and staring at Xianglun, but her hair color was black, not white. She should be the middle aged Xiaoyu, not her mother. In another scene, Xiaoyu's mother said that her daughter was panting and need to get some rest, she told Xianglun to not disturb her. Later, there was a gaze that stared during Xianglun's departure, she should be the middle aged Xiaoyu. This could explained as follows: Xiaoyu is alive in the initial time and space. The older Xiaoyu in 1999 is still alive even when the younger Xiaoyu started time travelling. The older Xiaoyu only ceased to exist during the time that the younger Xiaoyu died.
5. On the day that Qingyi kissed Xianglun, as Xiaoyu just finished playing "Secret" and came out from the antique piano room, she accidentally bumped into Dayong, the school cleaning worker. Since Dayong was the first person she saw, Dayong was able to see her. Because Dayong had overheard the conversation between Xiaoyu and her teacher 20 years ago, he knew the secret of time travelling. Dayong apologized to Xiaoyu because Xianglun will not be able to see her because of him.
6. Why did the white out texts appear on the table where Xianglun was sitting after the graduation ceremony? Xiaoyu travelled to the future so she could listen to the song that Xianglun had promised to play for her during the graduation ceremony. She saw Xianglun wore Qingyi's bracelet and misjudged the situation, thinking that Xianglun was dating Qingyi. She went back to 1979, wrote her last words on the desk in her classroom before dying because of an asthma attack. Because the words were written in 1979, the writing in the desk appeared weathered when Xianglun saw it.
7. After the white out incident, Xianglun ran to Xiaoyu's house immediately. Since Xiaoyu already died in the past, the corresponding middle-aged Xiaoyu also disappeared.
8. Then, when Xianglun entered the house and Xiaoyu's mother said: "I don't know where the child went to play", it is believed that her mother learned of the death of Xiaoyu during that time. So her mother's memories of living with Xiaoyu in the past 20 years slowly disappeared.
9. Xiaoyu's mother saw the drawing that Xiaoyu made. She realized that the person in the drawing that was made 20 years ago is Xianglun, the person standing beside her. That is why she said "Mom should have believed you".
10. Due to the urgency of the building's demolition, Xianglun played the score faster than the normal tempo. Hence, the time and space he finally returned was not equal to 20 years ago, but earlier, where Xiaoyu was still alive. However, the movie had not mentioned how early he had returned and if Xiaoyu knew about Xianglun. But, it probably means that she did not know Xianglun based on her facial expression.
11. Regarding why Xianglun was able to live normally in the past (1979) and appeared in the graduation photo, there is an argument that when he finished the piano score, his blood had dropped on the antique piano due to his serious injuries (this close-up was captured in the movie), and the effect of the blood made it possible for him to be seen by other people in the past. Another argument is that the antique piano was destroyed in 1999 and all the magic of the piano was lost, thus the second rule of the score had been ineffective. Xiaoyu also dropped a tear on the antique piano while she was playing "Secret" after the graduation ceremony. Perhaps the drop of tear prevented Xiaoyu from ever travel to the future again. Thus, she wonders in the past if Xianglun loves her. And Xianglun drop of blood allow him to stay in the past where everyone sees him.

Supplement: The above-mentioned reason why Xiaoyu was living in 1999 seems to be somewhat complicated. Another simple but unlikely way is, Xiaoyu's mom was mentally shocked by the death of Xiaoyu in 1979, she imagines that Xiaoyu is still alive. So she told Xianglun that Xiaoyu was upstairs.

== Music ==
A soundtrack album was released by JVR Music on 13 August 2007.

== Reception ==
For about an hour Secret delivers a highly satisfying love triangle that made me like it. Then it turns into something else that made me love it. Chou's directorial touch is patient and slightly melancholy and reflective.

— Combustible Celluloid

According to Cinema Online, Chou does a better job behind the scenes than in front of the camera. The pace of the story is satisfying, cinematography is beautiful and Chou is able to convey the magic of music: "You leave the cinema with the image of Chou's fingers dancing over the piano keys, creating that extraordinary music. It will be the image of Chou playing the piano one-handed, playing two pianos at the same time, and playing the piano with his upturned face in dream-like bliss. That is what makes this film worth the watch. As I said, its salvation. Music, so it seems, really can be magical."

LoveHKFilm.com agrees that Chou is not the best male lead for a romantic role, he is not able to produce the range of emotions needed to touch moviegoers. Instead, the female lead Kwai Lun Mei was praised for her excellent acting. The critic regards the film as a nice, romantic, fairly good picture and that Jay Chou directs with an able hand. Cinematography and art direction was also praised for its beauty, as well as the film score. The critic regards the illogical story as the biggest disadvantage for the film, saying that the plot often does not follow its own rules, creating logical gaps. The supporting actors were found to be boring, with the exception of Anthony Wong, who was praised for his acting diversity. According to the critic, there is a certain chemistry between Chou and Gwei but their dialogues lack depth and emotions, largely due to Chou's inability to act well. He regarded Chou as a likable, charming presence but utterly without any passion on screen, being too distant in his emotions.

Asianmovieweb is surprised to see Chou as a good director but dismisses him as an actor. The soundtrack is praised for its beauty as well as the cinematography and the attention Chou paid to tiny details. The critic also mentioned the logical gaps in the story being very distracting.

Variety thought the film was surprisingly good, with decent acting and praised the music as well. The critic sees South Korean cinematic influences in Secret and compared the style of the film to early Hollywood pictures from the 1940s and Taiwanese pictures from the 1970s.

movieXclusive.com states that it is rare to see such a well directed picture from a musician-turned-director but Chou is able to "pull it off". Casting choices were praised especially with regard to Anthony Wong and Kwai Lun Mei, the latter being praised for her ability to create a secretive air around herself. The best part of the film according to the critic is the "onslaught of piano performances" that were compared to action scenes of Jet Li and Tony Jaa. However, the critic was not satisfied with the editing and pacing of the film but nevertheless regarded the film as a successful piece of art.

Combustible Celluloid named Secret one of the "most enchanting, captivating features" of the 2008 San Francisco International Film Festival.

== Remakes ==
On 15 February 2021, it was announced that a Korean remake of the movie would be directed by Seo Yoo-min, and would star Doh Kyung-soo, Won Jin-ah, and Shin Ye-eun. Filming for the movie started in November 2021 and ended on 21 January 2022. It was released on 27 January 2025.

A Japanese remake was released in 2024.

== Awards and nominations ==
Secret won three awards out of seven nominations from the 44th Golden Horse Awards in 2007 and 27th Hong Kong Film Awards in 2008.

Year	Award	Category	Nomination	Result	Ref
2007	44th Golden Horse Awards	Best Supporting Actress	Alice Tzeng	Nominated	
2007	44th Golden Horse Awards	Best Visual Effects	Victor Wong, Eddy Wong, Yiu Ming Cheung, Donnie Lai	Won	
2007	44th Golden Horse Awards	Best Original Score	Terdsak Janpan and Jay Chou	Nominated	
2007	44th Golden Horse Awards	Best Original Song	"Secret" ("不能說的‧秘密"); Written by Jay Chou and Vincent Fang; Performed by Jay Chou	Won	
2007	44th Golden Horse Awards	Outstanding Taiwanese Film of the Year	Secret	Won	
2007	44th Golden Horse Awards	Outstanding Taiwanese Filmmaker of the Year	Jay Chou	Nominated	
2008	27th Hong Kong Film Awards	Best Asian Film	Secret	Nominated	
