= Rain or Shine (TV series) =

South Korean television series

- Promotional poster
- Also known as: Just Lovers
- Hangul: 그냥 사랑하는 사이
- Lit.: Just Between Lovers
- RR: Geunyang saranghaneun sai
- MR: Kŭnyang saranghanŭn sai
- Genre: Romance; Melodrama
- Created by: JTBC
- Written by: Yoo Bo-ra
- Directed by: Kim Jin-won
- Starring: Lee Jun-ho; Won Jin-ah; Lee Ki-woo; Kang Han-na
- Country of origin: South Korea
- Original language: Korean
- No. of episodes: 16

Production
- Executive producers: Ham Young-hoon; Kim Ji-yeon; Park Jae-sam
- Producer: Park Woo-ram
- Running time: 70 minutes
- Production company: Celltrion Entertainment

Original release
- Network: JTBC
- Release: December 11, 2017 – January 30, 2018

Rain or Shine (Korean: 그냥 사랑하는 사이) is a 2017 South Korean television series starring Lee Jun-ho and Won Jin-ah, with Lee Ki-woo and Kang Han-na. The series is about people's love, hope, and dreams despite their painful past. It aired on JTBC from December 11, 2017 to January 30, 2018, every Monday and Tuesday at 23:00 (KST). The story of the series was based on the Sampoong Department Store collapse incident event in 1995.

== Synopsis ==
The story of two individuals who lost their loved ones in a tragic accident and try to carry on with their lives as if they are not in pain. Throughout that time, they slowly fall in love.

Due to the series was based on the 1995 Sampoong Department Store collapse, several events about this incident were mentioned, such as the scenes about Space S Mall collapse incident in 2005 during early episodes, as well as the Biotown and the memorial park that located on the former site of the Space S Mall in the final episode were references to Acrovista and the memorial in the Maeheon Citizen's Forest.

== Cast ==
=== Main ===
- Lee Jun-ho as Lee Kang-doo, a former athlete who dreamt of becoming a professional soccer player but suddenly lost his father in an accident and had to undergo three years of rehabilitation for his injured legs.
  - Nam Da-reum as young Kang-doo
- Won Jin-ah as Ha Moon-soo, a young woman who lost her younger sister in an accident but lives life fiercely and stays strong while taking care of her mother.
  - Park Si-eun as young Moon-soo
- Lee Ki-woo as Seo Joo-won, an architect at a construction firm.
- Kang Han-na as Jung Yoo-jin, team leader of external relations at the construction firm where Joo-won works.

=== Supporting ===
==== People around Kang-doo ====
- Kim Hye-jun as Lee Jae-young, Kang-doo's younger sister who is a doctor at a local hospital.
- Yoon Se-ah as Ma-ri, Kang-doo's friend who runs a nightclub.
- Kim Kang-hyun as Sang-man, Kang-doo's neighbor.
- Na Moon-hee as Jeong Sook-hee, a medicine seller.

==== People around Moon-soo ====
- Yoon Yoo-sun as Yoon-ok, Moon-soo's mother.
- Ahn Nae-sang as Ha Dong-chul, Moon-soo's father.
- Han Seo-jin as Ha Yeon-soo, Moon-soo's younger sister who died in an accident.
- Park Hee-von as Kim Wan-jin, Moon-soo's friend who is a webtoon writer.
- Kim Min-kyu as Jin-young, Wan-jin's assistant.
- Choi Hyo-eun as Hwa-sai

==== People around Joo-won ====
- Nam Gi-ae as Joo-won's mother.
- Tae In-ho as Jung Yoo-taek, Yoo-jin's older brother.
- Park Gyu-young as So-mi, Moon-soo's workmate.

=== Special appearances ===
- Kim Jin-woo as Lee In-yong
- Hong Kyung as Choi Sung-jae
- Shin Hyun-been as an architect

== Production ==
- The series marks Lee Jun-ho's first lead role in a TV series, as well as rookie actress Won Jin-ah's first-ever major role. She was selected for the role out of 120 candidates.
- The first script reading of the cast was held on August 22, 2017.

== Original soundtrack ==
Rain or Shine OST Album

Soundtrack album by Various Artists
- Recorded: 2017
- Genre: Soundtrack
- Languages: Korean; English
- Labels: Universal Music Korea; EL Wide

=== Part 1 ===
Released on December 12, 2017
No.	Title	Lyrics	Music	Artist	Length
1.	"I Open My Eyes" (눈을 뜬다)	Nam Hye-seung; Park Jin-ho	Jeon Jong-hyuk; Heo Seok	Zitten	04:33
2.	"I Open My Eyes" (Inst.)		Jeon Jong-hyuk; Heo Seok		04:33
Total length:					09:06

=== Part 2 ===
Released on December 19, 2017
No.	Title	Lyrics	Music	Artist	Length
1.	"Aurora (feat. Kim Kyung-hee)" (오로라)	Nam Hye-seung; Kim Kyung-hee; Jello Ann	Nam Hye-seung; Park Sang-hee; Kim Kyung-hee	Savina & Drones	05:16
2.	"Aurora" (Inst.)		Nam Hye-seung; Park Sang-hee; Kim Kyung-hee		05:16
Total length:					10:32

=== Part 3 ===
Released on December 26, 2017
No.	Title	Lyrics	Music	Artist	Length
1.	"I Just Miss You" (그냥 보고싶은 사이)	Nam Hye-seung; Park Jin-ho	Nam Hye-seung; Park Jin-ho	Ra.D	03:57
2.	"I Just Miss You" (Inst.)		Nam Hye-seung; Park Jin-ho		03:57
Total length:					07:54

=== Part 4 ===
Released on January 2, 2018
No.	Title	Lyrics	Music	Artist	Length
1.	"You Did That To Me That Day" (넌 그렇게 그날 내게로)	Nam Hye-seung; Park Jin-ho	1601	Lee Si-eun	05:06
2.	"You Did That To Me That Day" (Inst.)		1601		05:06
Total length:					10:12

=== Part 5 ===
Released on January 9, 2018
No.	Title	Artist	Length
1.	"Stand By Me" (있어줘)	Lee Chang-min	4:05
2.	"Stand By Me" (Inst.)		4:05
Total length:			8:10

=== Part 6 ===
Released on January 16, 2018
No.	Title	Artist	Length
1.	"What Do You Need To Say" (어떤 말이 필요하니)	Lee Jun-ho	4:12
2.	"What Do You Need To Say" (Inst.)		4:12
Total length:			8:24

=== Part 7 ===
Released on January 23, 2018
No.	Title	Artist	Length
1.	"Where We"	Ryu Ji-hyun, Kim Kyung-hee of April 2nd	3:21
2.	"Where We" (Inst.)		3:21
Total length:			6:42

== Ratings ==
Average TV viewership ratings (nationwide)
Ep.	Original broadcast date	Average audience share	
Ep.	Original broadcast date	Nielsen Korea	TNmS
1	December 11, 2017	2.409%	2.3%
2	December 12, 2017	1.924%	1.6%
3	December 18, 2017	1.936%	2.2%
4	December 19, 2017	2.061%	1.8%
5	December 25, 2017	1.635%	1.9%
6	December 26, 2017	1.625%	1.8%
7	January 1, 2018	1.678%	1.7%
8	January 2, 2018	1.304%	1.7%
9	January 8, 2018	1.685%	1.5%
10	January 9, 2018	1.978%	1.8%
11	January 15, 2018	1.436%	1.8%
12	January 16, 2018	1.796%	1.8%
13	January 22, 2018	1.263%	2.2%
14	January 23, 2018	1.686%	1.9%
15	January 29, 2018	1.500%	1.8%
16	January 30, 2018	2.011%	2.2%
Average		1.745%	1.9%
In the table above, the blue numbers represent the lowest ratings and the red numbers represent the highest ratings.; This series aired on a cable channel/pay TV which normally has a relatively smaller audience compared to free-to-air TV/public broadcasters (KBS, SBS, MBC and EBS).

== Awards and nominations ==
Year	Award	Category	Nominee	Result	Ref.
2018	54th Baeksang Arts Awards	Best New Actress	Won Jin-ah	Nominated	
2018	6th APAN Star Awards	Best New Actress	Won Jin-ah	Won	
2018	2nd The Seoul Awards	Best New Actress	Won Jin-ah	Nominated	

== See also ==
- Sampoong Department Store collapse
- Chocolate: 2019 JTBC television series, also based on Sampoong Department Store collapse.
