= Acrovista =

Apartment complex in Seoul, South Korea

- 아크로비스타
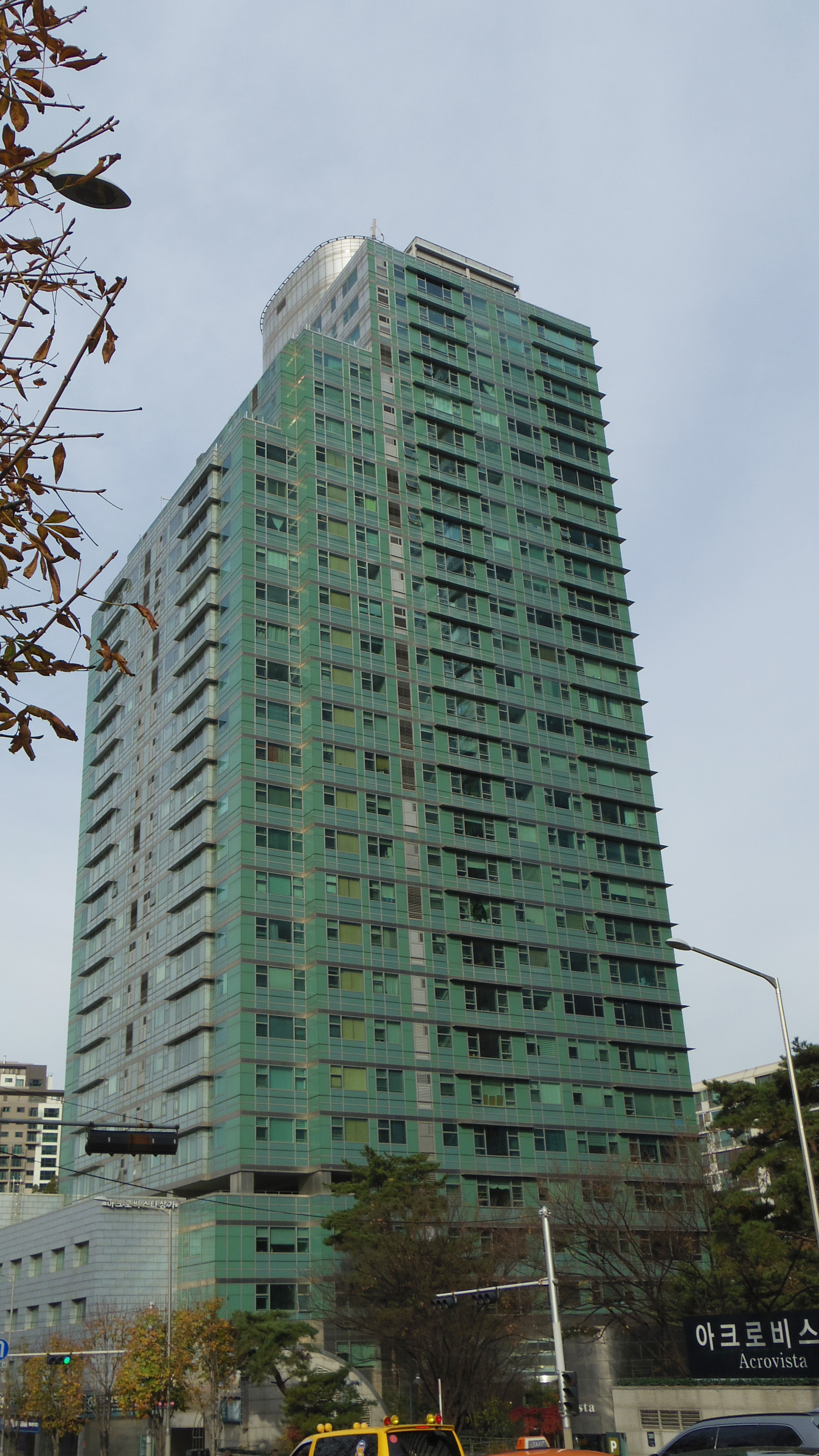
- Acrovista Building A (2018)
- Interactive map of the Acrovista area

General information
- Location: 188 Seochojungang-ro, Seocho District, Seoul, South Korea
- Coordinates: 37°29′53″N 127°00′46″E
- Opened: June 25, 2004

Technical details
- Floor count: 37

Other information
- Number of units: 757 apartments; 82 officetels

Acrovista (Korean: 아크로비스타) is a residential apartment building complex of three buildings in Seocho District, Seoul, South Korea. It was completed in June 2004, and became open to move-ins on June 25, 2004. It consists of three 37-story buildings, named A, B and C, with 757 apartments and 82 officetels. It has been described as a luxury apartment complex.

The complex is located on the former site of the Sampoong Department Store, which collapsed in 1995. The plot of land had gone up for auction in November 1996, and was purchased by the company Daesang Group. That company assumed control of the land in August 1999. Acrovista's construction was handled by company DL E&C.

As of 2025, former South Korean first lady Kim Keon Hee, wife of president Yoon Suk Yeol, owns a 164 m^{2} (1,770 ft^{2}) apartment in the building. The apartment drew public attention after Yoon's 2024 impeachment was confirmed in 2025, and Yoon was required to move out of his presidential residence in Hannam-dong. As of April 7, 2025, it is expected that Yoon and Kim will move back into Acrovista. Several interviewed residents of Acrovista expressed dissatisfaction with the first couple's return. Some expressed disappointment with Yoon's 2024 declaration of martial law that caused his impeachment, others worried about disruption to their daily lives, and others worried that Yoon's presence would affect the value of their property. During Yoon's impeachment trials, gatherings near the apartment's entrance were prohibited by police.
