= Long Live the King (2019 film) =

- Theatrical release poster
- Directed by: Kang Yun-seong
- Screenplay by: Ryu Kyung-sun
- Produced by: Kim Yong-gi; Jang Won-seok; Yoo Young-chae
- Starring: Kim Rae-won; Won Jin-ah; Jin Seon-kyu; Choi Gwi-hwa
- Production company: B.A. Entertainment
- Distributed by: Megabox Plus M; Contents Nandakinda
- Release date: June 9, 2019
- Running time: 118 minutes
- Country: South Korea
- Language: Korean
- Box office: US$7.8 million

Long Live the King (Korean: 롱 리브 더 킹: 목포 영웅) is a 2019 South Korean action comedy film directed by Kang Yun-seong and starring Kim Rae-won, Won Jin-ah, Jin Seon-kyu, and Choi Gwi-hwa. The screenplay is based on webtoon of the same name by Beodeunamusup, using story elements from the first season.

The film earned director Kang the Director of the Year Award and Kim Rae-won the Actor of the Year Award at the 2019 Chungju International Film Festival.

== Synopsis ==
Kkangpae boss Jang Se-chool meets lawyer Kang So-hyun at an anti-construction protest and quickly falls in love, but she thinks of him as a thug. She repeatedly rejects him while telling him to live a decent life. So-hyun eventually tries to get rid of Se-chool by saying that she can never accept him because her life goal is to become a first lady. Meanwhile, one of Se-chool's friends is on death row, and the only way to save him is through a presidential pardon. When Se-chool ends up rescuing passengers after a bus accident at Mokpo Bridge, he is praised as a hero; he decides to use his newfound fame to run for public office, believing that success will lead him to win So-hyun's heart and save his friend.

== Cast ==
- Kim Rae-won as Jang Se-Chool
- Won Jin-ah as Kang So-Hyun
- Jin Seon-kyu as Jo Kwang-Choon
- Choi Gwi-hwa as Choi Man-Soo
- Choi Moo-sung as Hwang Bo-Yoon
- Joo Jin-mo as So-pal
- Im Hyung-joon as Han Man-sub
- Hong Ki-joon as Jung Chul-min
- Choi Jae-hwan as Ho-Tae
- Cha Yub as Geun-Bae
- Yoo Hee-je as Im Jik-sa

== Production ==
Filming began on October 9, 2018. One of the plot elements involves a bus accident at a bridge in Mokpo; it took the crew three months to make arrangements to film on the bridge, with filming at the location taking place for about twelve hours. Shooting for the scene was also done at the studio and other locations, and took about a week to finish.

== Release and reception ==
Long Live the King was released on June 19, 2019, and grossed $3.5 million on its opening weekend, ultimately grossing $8 million at the South Korea box office. The Korea Herald described the plot as "clunky" and Kim Rae-won's performance as "one of his finest works."
