= Gosichon =

Gosichon (Korean: 고시촌), also called Goshichon or Goshi Village, is a Korean term used to refer to residences of civil service examinees.

== Etymology ==
The origin of the term is from "Gosi" (Korean: 고시; Hanja: 考試) and "Chon" (Korean: 촌; Hanja: 村), literally "town of civil service examinees".

== History ==
One of the notable goshichons in Sillim-dong, Gwanak District formed in 1975 due to campuses of Seoul National University moving to the area.

== See also ==
- Gosiwon
