= Secret: Untold Melody =

2025 film by Seo Yoo-min

- Theatrical release poster
- Hangul: 말할 수 없는 비밀
- Lit.: A Secret That Cannot Be Told
- RR: Malhal su eomneun bimil
- MR: Marhal su ŏmnŭn pimil
- Directed by: Seo Yoo-min
- Written by: Seo Yoo-min; Yoo Seung-hee
- Based on: Secret by Jay Chou
- Produced by: Kim Won-guk
- Starring: Doh Kyung-soo; Won Jin-ah; Shin Ye-eun
- Cinematography: Yang Hyun-suk
- Edited by: Kim Hyung-joo
- Music by: Kim Jun-seong; Kim Ji-ae
- Production companies: Hive Media Corp.; Higround; Solaire Partners
- Distributed by: Plus M Entertainment
- Release date: January 27, 2025
- Running time: 103 minutes
- Country: South Korea
- Language: Korean
- Box office: US$5.7 million

Secret: Untold Melody (Korean: 말할 수 없는 비밀) is a 2025 South Korean romantic fantasy film directed by Seo Yoo-min and starring Doh Kyung-soo, Won Jin-ah, and Shin Ye-eun. The film is a remake of the 2007 Taiwanese film Secret by Jay Chou. It follows Yu-jun, a piano prodigy and music student, who accidentally encounters Jung-a playing mysterious music in an old practice room on campus, sparking a fantasy romance. The film was released on January 27, 2025.

== Premise ==
Kim Yu-jun's promising career as a concert pianist is tragically cut short by a debilitating injury. Seeking a fresh start, he travels to Korea to teach at a prestigious music school. There, he encounters Yoo Jung-a, a captivating and enigmatic musician whose playing possesses a haunting beauty. As Yu-jun falls deeper in love, he uncovers a series of unsettling clues that suggest Jung-a is connected to a long-forgotten past. He soon realizes their love is caught in a time-bending paradox, forcing him to make an impossible choice that will determine their fate.

== Cast ==
- Doh Kyung-soo as Kim Yu-jun
- Won Jin-ah as Yoo Jung-a
- Shin Ye-eun as Park In-hee
- Bae Seong-woo as Kim Seung-ho
- Kim Wook as Lee Jae-sik
- Ahn Seung-gyun as Gyeong-bong
- Kang Kyung-hun as Yeon-seo
- Kang Mal-geum as Min-sook

== Production ==
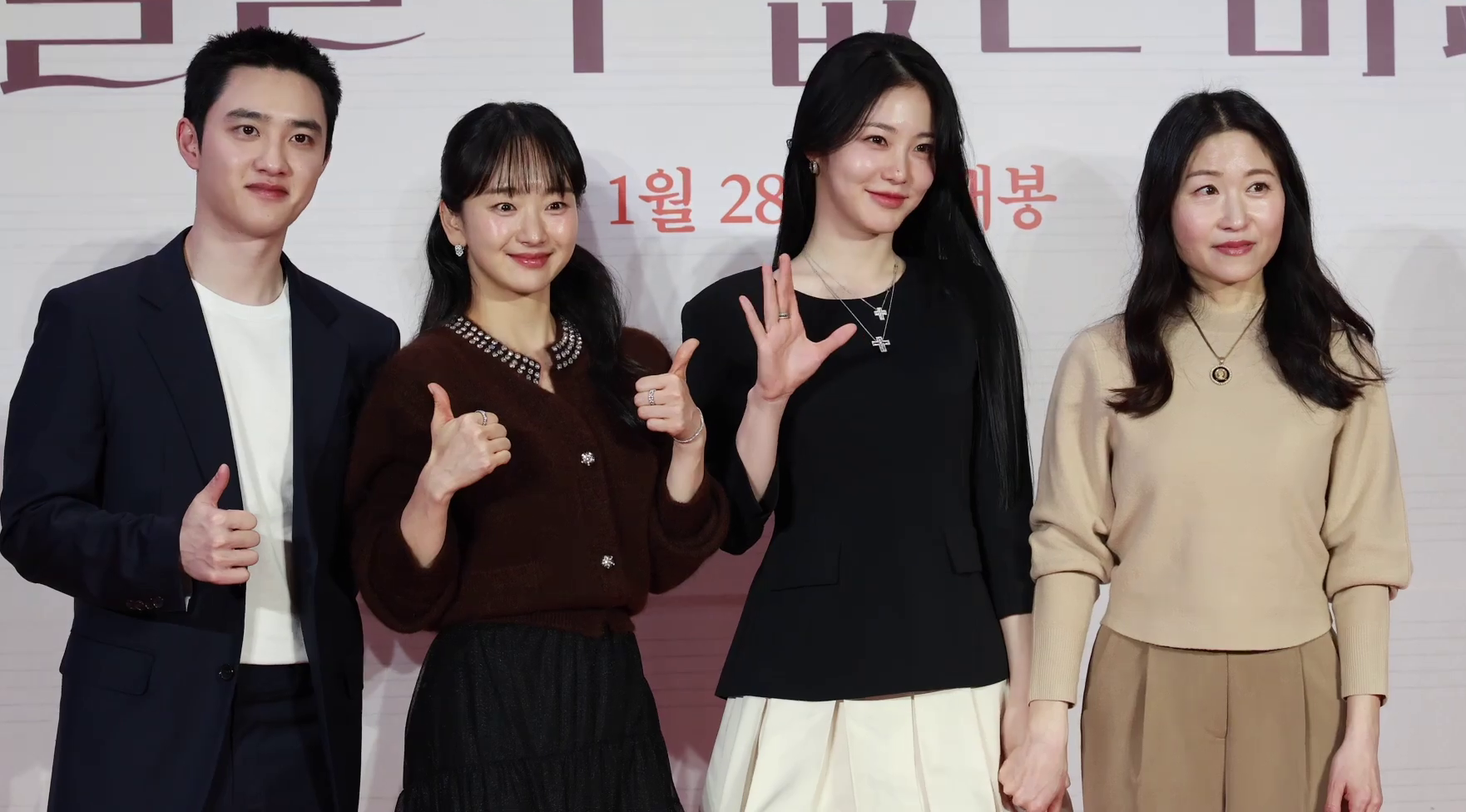
The main cast and director Seo in January 2025.

The film, a South Korean remake of the 2007 Taiwanese film Secret by Jay Chou, was announced in February 2021; it is produced by Hive Media Corp., directed by Seo Yoo-min, and distributed by Plus M Entertainment. Doh Kyung-soo was confirmed as the male lead on the same month, while the round of auditions for the female lead lasted until June 2021, selecting Won Jin-ah and Shin Ye-eun.

Principal photography began on November 17, 2021, and ended on January 21, 2022.

Bae Seong-woo was announced in a supporting role in December 2021, and Kim Wook confirmed his appearance in February 2022 after filming ended.

== Release ==
In December 2024, Secret: Untold Melody was reportedly scheduled for release at the end of January 2025. It was initially expected to be release on January 28, but later was changed to January 27.

== Reception ==
Shim Sun-ah of Yonhap News Agency described Secret: Untold Melody as a "well-crafted yet somewhat ordinary remake" that addresses some narrative flaws and features a realistic performance by Doh Kyung-soo despite his lack of sight-reading experience, but ultimately concludes that it is weighed down by additional subplots and excessive dialogue, failing to deliver "a memorable score or lasting emotional impact" and rendering it forgettable. Kim Ki-joong of Seoul Shinmun described the film as a refreshing take on the original, praising the engaging performances of the lead actors and the incorporation of modern elements absent in the 2007 version, while lamenting that the iconic piano battle scene lacks its original impact, but ultimately appreciating the film's emotional depth and new musical interpretations.
