= Gosiwon =

Low-cost lodging facility in South Korea

Gosiwon (Korean: 고시원) are a kind of single room occupancy class of building found in South Korea. Originally designed for students preparing to take exams, they are characterized by low rent, shared bathrooms and kitchens, and very limited private space.

They are legally defined as "industrial activity that operates boarding businesses or other unclassified accommodation facilities that provide meals and lodging facilities together for a contract period" in the South Korean standard industry classification of the National Statistical Office.

== History ==
As the name suggests, a gosiwon was originally a residential facility for long-term test takers preparing for exams, but people other than test takers now reside in them because they are cheaper than other residential facilities. As the main users of gosiwon changed from students to office workers, the name "Gosi-tel" became popular. More and more people removed the word "gosi" from its name, and some gave names such as "one-room-tel," "mini-one-room," "leaving-tel," and "~house". The groups using gosiwon can be largely divided into three categories: the first group is examinees, the second group is young single workers, the third group is the elderly, the disabled, the basic livelihood security recipients, and the urban poor, including low-wage and unstable workers. As such, gosiwon has become an unstable residential area for the urban poor, which has a short-lived household form.

The gosiwon appeared in around 1980, when the housing redevelopment craze turned Seoul's slums into apartments, and the low-cost housing for the poor in the city disappeared. During this period, gosiwon changed its original purpose to a residential form for the poor. Park Min-kyu, a novelist, writes the following in his short novel "During the Period of Staying at Gosiwon in Gap," which was published in "Modern Literature" in June 2004.

Anyway, 1991 was the last time day laborers and nightlife workers began using goshiwons as lodgings, and there were still people studying goshiwons in those goshiwons.

In 1994, various media, including The Chosun Ilbo, the Kukmin Ilbo, the Kyunghyang Shinmun, and the Munhwa Ilbo, began to report the change of gosiwon. After the 1997 Asian financial crisis, the use of gosiwon increased in 1998 with office workers at the center.

The number of goshiwons in Seoul increased steeply from 811 in 2001 to 1,229 in 2002, 1,507 in 2003, and to 2,814 in 2006. The National Emergency Management Agency said there were 4,211 goshiwons nationwide as of January 1, 2006, and the Seoul Metropolitan Fire and Disaster Headquarters found that 108,428 people lived in 3,451 goshiwons in Seoul from July 31 to September 25, 2008.

== Contract ==
It is advisable to make a monthly contract or to keep a copy and receipt after the contract is completed, as there may be disputes over the refund of the remaining amount in excess of one month. It is recommended to pay with a credit card as much as possible in the case of a contract, and the issuance of a cash receipt in the event of a cash transfer or transfer of an account can prevent possible fraud. It is necessary to make sure that there is a "non-refundable" clause in the contract, so that there is less chance of losing money in the event of a mid-term contract termination. According to the consumer dispute settlement standard, when the contract is terminated prematurely, the examiner is required to deduct 10 percent of the remaining fees and refund the remaining amount.

According to the Korea Consumer Agency, out of 341 cases requiring damage relief from 2011 to 2015, 314 (92 percent) of the cases were rejected by the state-run examiners when they demanded a moderate cancellation. Victims by age group accounted for 53.1 percent in their 20s, followed by 20.7 percent in their 30s.

== See also ==
- Hasukjib
- Officetel
- Subdivided flat in Hong Kong
- Gosichon
