= Sampoong Department Store collapse =

1995 building collapse in Seoul, South Korea

Coordinates: 37°29′54″N 127°0′48″E

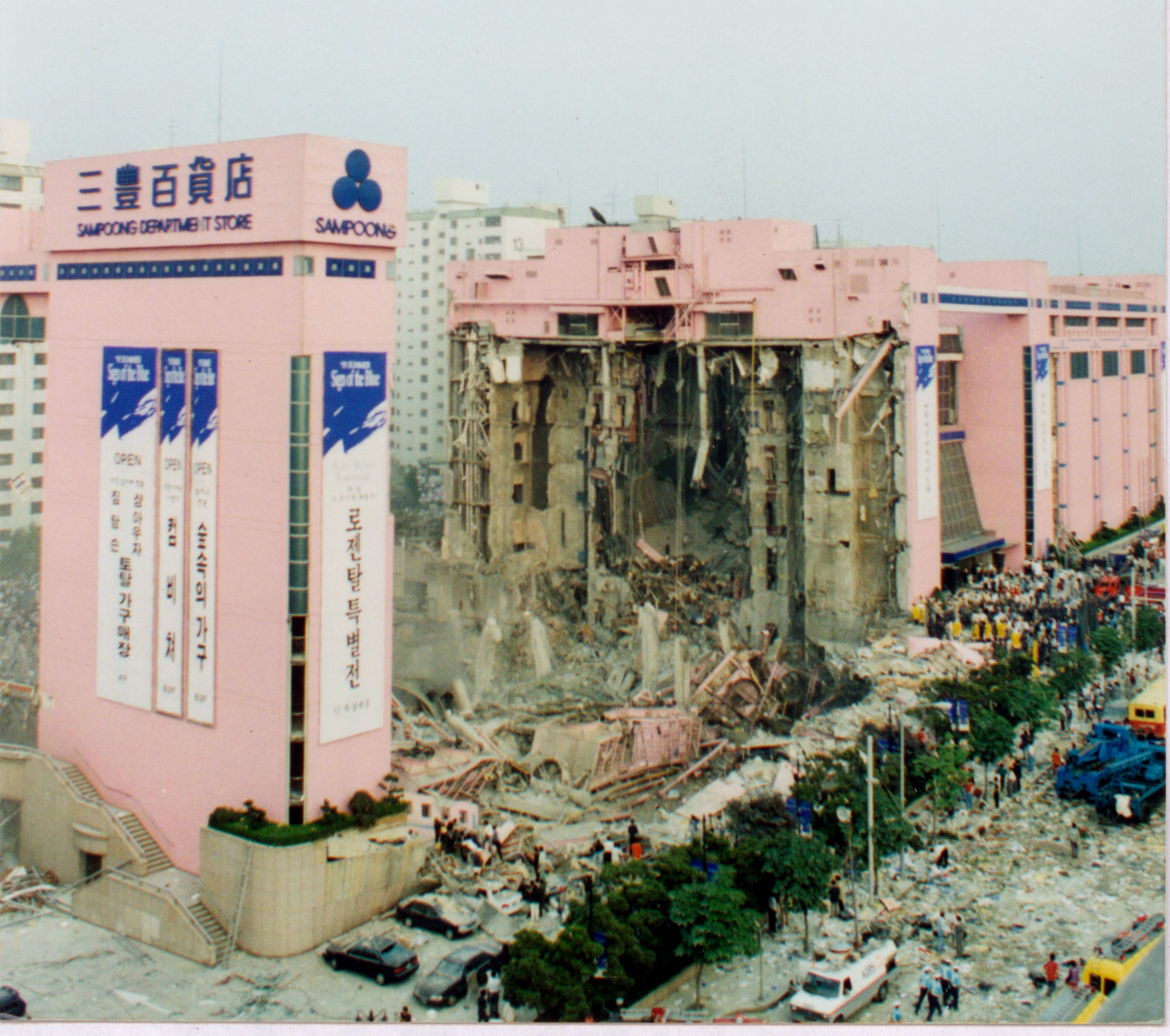
- The department store after the collapse
- Date: June 29, 1995; 31 years ago
- Time: 5:52 p.m. KST
- Location: Seoul, South Korea
- Cause: Structural overload, punching shear
- Deaths: 502
- Injuries: 937
- Missing: 31
- Suspects: Lee Joon; Lee Han-sang
- Verdict: Guilty
- Convictions: Criminal negligence resulting in death (Lee Joon); Corruption, accidental homicide (Lee Han-sang)
- Sentence: Lee Joon, 10.5 years in prison (later reduced to 7.5 years); Lee Han-sang, 7 years in prison

On June 29, 1995, the Sampoong Department Store (Korean: 삼풍백화점; Hanja: 三豐百貨店) in Seocho District, Seoul, South Korea, collapsed due to a structural failure. The collapse killed 502 people and injured 937, making it the largest peacetime disaster in South Korean history. It was the deadliest non-deliberate modern building collapse until the 2013 Rana Plaza factory collapse in Bangladesh.

Construction on the store began in 1987 and was completed in 1990. During construction, the chairman of Sampoong Group's construction division, Lee Joon, wanted changes to the concrete support columns that introduced structural concerns. When the company's general contractor resisted these changes, Lee ultimately fired them and used his own in-house construction company to complete the building. Investigators blamed the collapse primarily on this and other unsafe modifications made during the building's construction and lifespan.

On December 27, 1995, Lee Joon was convicted of criminal negligence and sentenced to 10 years and 6 months imprisonment. His sentence was later lessened to 7 years and 6 months on appeal. His son, Lee Han-sang, was convicted of corruption and accidental homicide and sentenced to 7 years imprisonment. Additionally, two city planners from the Seocho District were convicted of taking bribes.

== Background ==
Following the selection of Seoul as host city of the 1988 Summer Olympics, there was a large development boom in the Seoul Capital Area. Because local law at the time did not permit foreign contractors to sign project contracts in Seoul, most buildings were being built by South Korean companies. While South Korean construction had earned a strong international reputation — by the early 1980s, only the United States had more overseas projects than South Korea — building standards and regulatory oversight remained comparatively weak at home. Under pressure to deliver multiple projects at once, firms often rushed domestic construction, compromising quality.

The Sampoong Group began construction of the Sampoong Department Store in 1987 over a tract of land in the Seocho District previously used as a landfill. The building's plans originally called for a residential apartment building with four floors to be built by Woosung Construction. During construction, however, the blueprints were changed by the future chairman of Sampoong Group's construction division, Lee Joon, to instead create a large department store. This involved cutting away a number of support columns to install escalators and the addition of a fifth floor (originally meant for a roller skating rink, which was later changed to a food court).

Woosung refused to carry out these changes due to serious structural concerns. In response, Lee Joon fired them and used his own company to complete the store's construction instead. The building was completed in late 1989, and the department store opened to the public on July 7, 1990, attracting an estimated 40,000 people per day during its five years of existence. The store consisted of north and south wings connected by an atrium.

The completed building was a flat-slab structure without crossbeams or a steel skeleton, which effectively meant that there was no way to transfer the load across the floors. To maximise the floor space, Lee Joon ordered that the diameter of the floor columns be reduced to 60 cm (24 in), instead of the minimum of 80 cm (31 in) in the original blueprint that was required for the building to stand safely. In addition, the spacing between columns was increased to 11 metres (36 ft); with fewer columns, each one had to support a larger load than originally designed. The fifth-story food court floor had a built-in heating system known as an ondol, with hot water pipes passing through a 1.2-metre-thick (4 ft) concrete base. The weight and thickness of the ondol further increased the load on the structure.

Three air conditioning units, weighing 15 tonnes each when empty, were installed on the roof. These units generated high noise levels when operating, leading to complaints from adjacent property owners; in an attempt to remedy the situation, they were dragged across the roof to a new location in 1993, resulting in cracking. The units were moved over column 5E, where the most visible cracks in the fifth floor were seen before the collapse. The cracks worsened because the columns supporting the fifth floor were not aligned with the ones supporting lower floors, thus causing the load of the fifth floor to be transferred through the slab.

== Timeline of events ==
=== Collapse ===
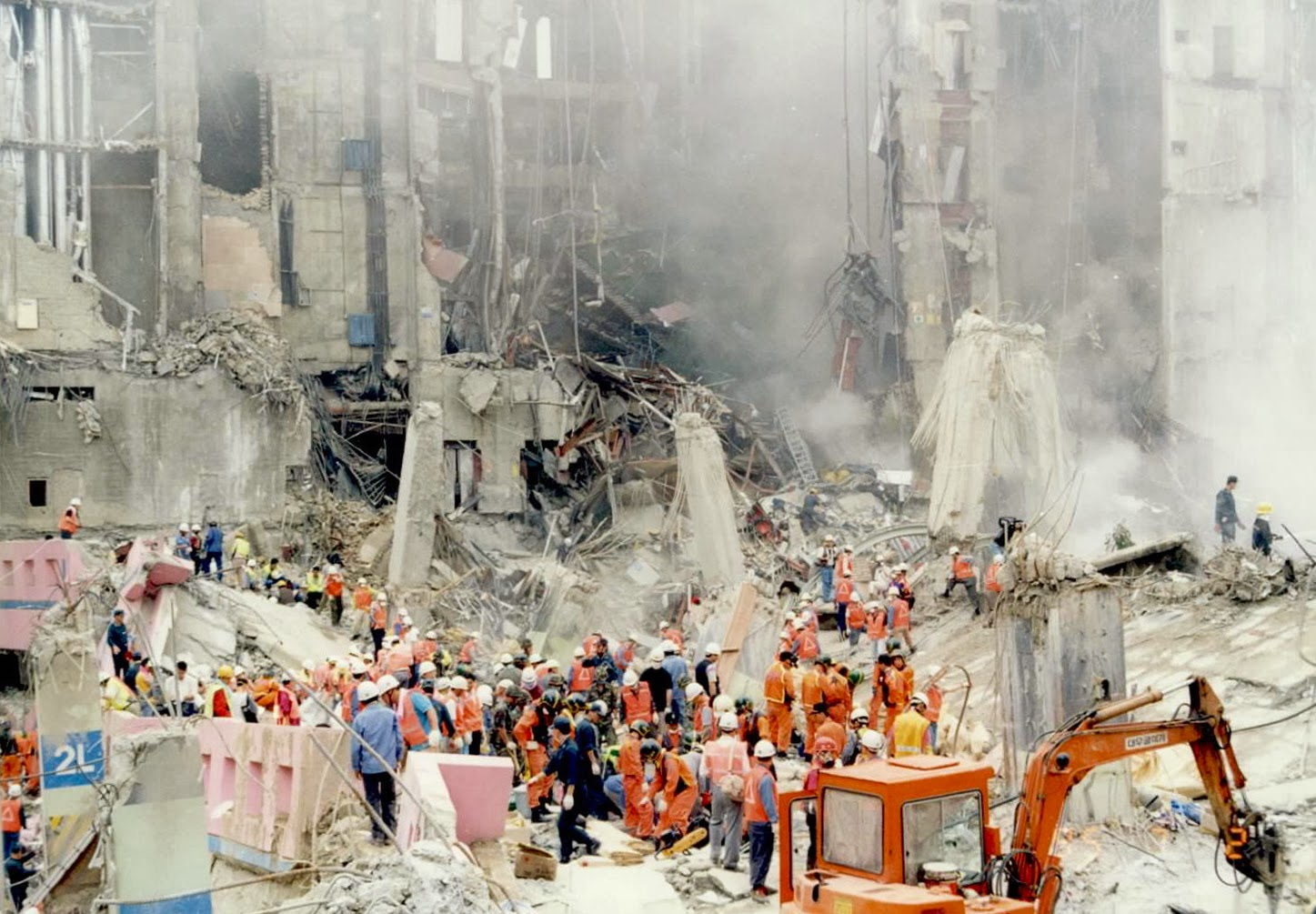
Rescue crews at the site of the collapse

In April 1995, cracks began to appear in the ceiling and the walls of Building A of the department store, causing rainwater to drip down. In addition to this, slight vibrations of the building were detected, indicating that the building was shaking, yet the only measures taken by the department store were to patch the cracks with sheet metal.

On the morning of June 29, the number of cracks in the area increased dramatically, prompting store management to close parts of the top floor. Nonetheless, the management failed to shut the building down or issue formal evacuation orders, as the number of customers in the building at the time was unusually high, and management did not want to lose the day's revenue. When civil engineering experts were invited to inspect the structure, a cursory check revealed that the building was at risk of collapse. The facility's manager also examined the slab in one of the fifth-floor restaurants only hours before the collapse. Five hours before the collapse, the first of several loud bangs was heard emanating from the top floors, as the vibration of the air conditioning caused the cracks in the slabs to widen further. Amid customer complaints about the vibration, the air conditioning was turned off, but the slabs connected to the pillars of the fifth floor sunk by around 15cm (5.9 in), while the cracks in the floor had already grown to 10 cm (3.9 in)

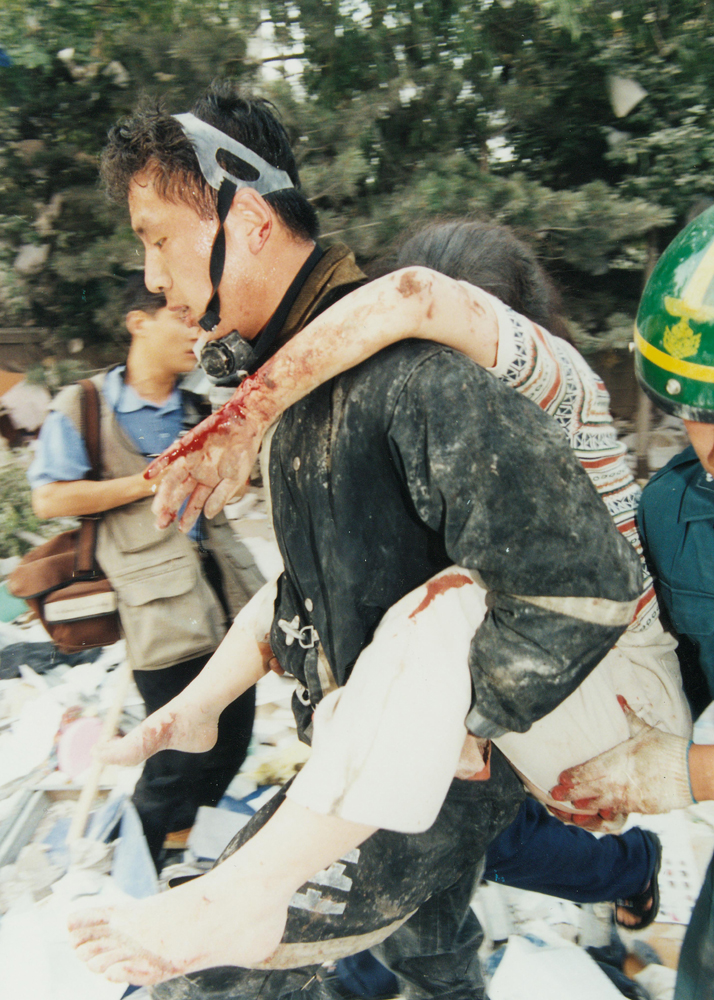
Firefighter rescuing victim following the collapse

An emergency board of directors meeting was held when it became clear that the building's collapse was inevitable. The directors suggested that all staff and customers should be evacuated, but Lee Joon violently refused to do so for fear of revenue losses. Nevertheless, Lee Joon and the executives left the building safely before the collapse occurred.

At about 5:00 p.m., KST (UTC+9:00), as the fifth floor ceiling began to sink, store workers finally closed off all customer access to the fifth floor. 57 minutes before the collapse, the store was packed with hundreds of shoppers, but still, Lee Joon did not close the store or attempt any repairs. At about 5:52 p.m., cracking sounds could be heard and workers began to sound alarms and evacuate the building, but it was too late. The roof gave way and the air conditioning units crashed onto the overloaded fifth floor, which then gave way. In less than twenty seconds, the building's main columns (which had been weakened by the installation of the escalators) failed, followed by all the columns in the south wing. The store's south wing, excepting the very southernmost part, then collapsed completely into the basement at around 5:55 p.m., trapping more than 1,500 people inside. 502 people died and 937 were injured. The disaster resulted in property damage totaling about ₩270 billion (about US$206 million).

=== Rescue efforts ===
Rescue crews were on the scene within minutes of the disaster, with cranes and other heavy equipment being brought in the next day. Seoul's mayor, Choi Pyong-yol, later announced the rescue would be called off due to concerns that the unstable remains of the store would collapse. After massive protests, especially from friends and relatives of those still missing, Choi and officials agreed to continue looking for survivors, with the remains of the store being steadied by guy cables. At one point, Korea Telecom was transmitting a signal every half hour, designed to trigger cellphones or pagers that trapped survivors might be carrying.

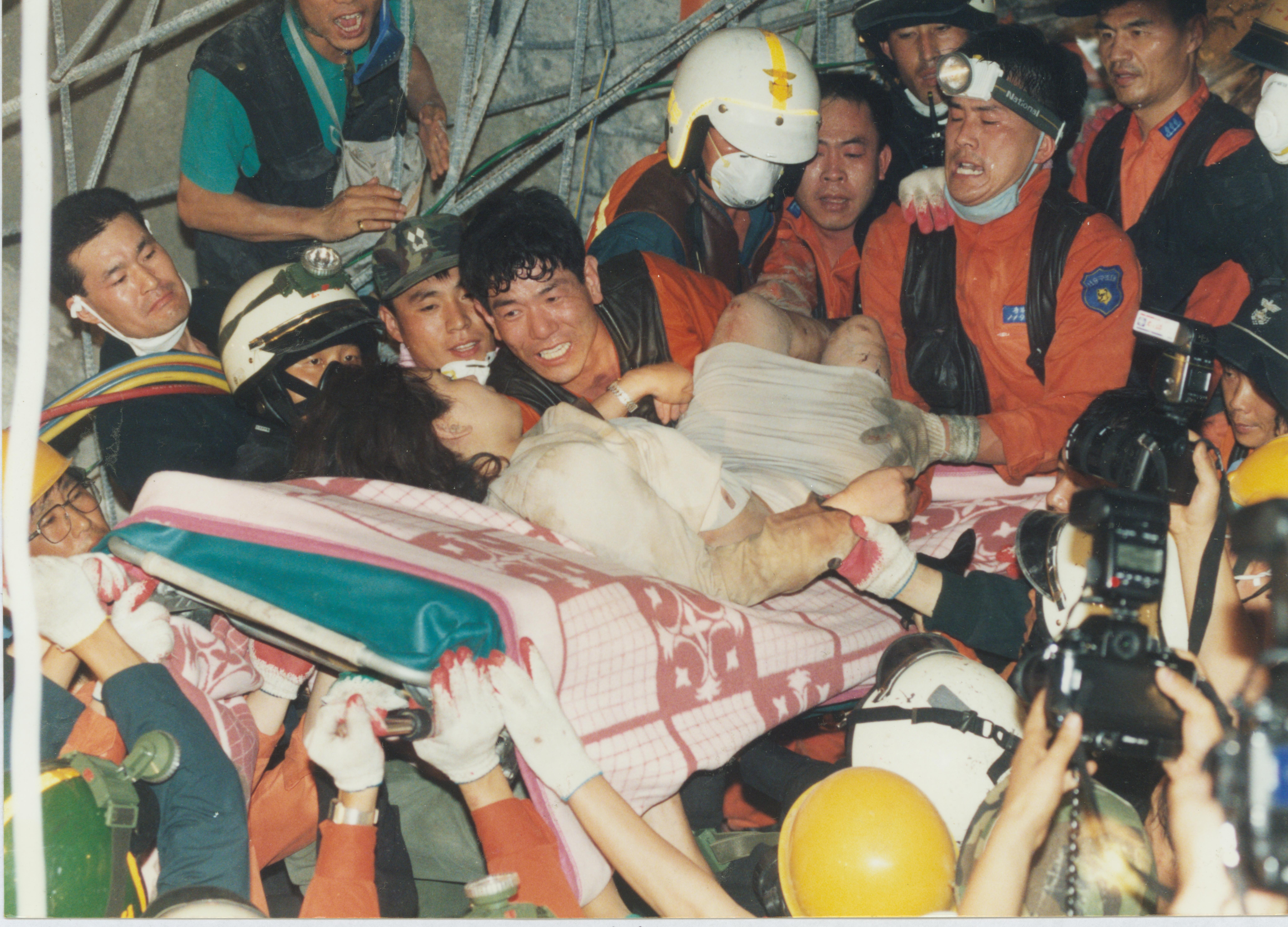
Rescue of trapped victims following the collapse

After nearly a week, the focus was on removing the debris, but construction crews continued to search for victims. Two weeks after the collapse, city officials concluded that anybody who was still in the building must have already died; therefore, further efforts would be made only towards "recovery", not "rescue."

Despite the sweltering heat, some who were not rescued in the first few days avoided dehydration by drinking rainwater. The last to be rescued, 19-year-old store clerk Park Seung-hyun (Korean: 박승현; Hanja: 朴勝賢), was pulled from the wreckage 17 days after the collapse with a few scratches; 18-year-old Yoo Ji-hwan was pulled out after nearly 12 days; and a man rescued after 9 days reported that other trapped survivors had drowned from the rain and from the water used for fire suppression.

== Casualties ==
The collapse killed 502 people and injured about 937 people. About 1,500 people were trapped inside the structure. Rescue attempts lasted over the course of many days leading to the rescue of a few survivors, including two that were pulled from the wreckage after a week.

Nationality	Number
Australia	2
Brazil	1
France	1
Canada	3
China	2
Japan	1
South Africa	3
South Korea	487
Thailand	1
United States	1

== Investigation ==
The investigation of the collapse was headed by Professor Chung Lan (Korean: 정란; Hanja: 鄭鑾) of Dankook University's engineering school. Shortly after the collapse, leaking gas was suspected as the probable cause because two other gas explosions had occurred in South Korea that year. Instead, the fires in the rubble were from burning automotive gasoline coming from crushed cars parked in the underground garage, and a gas explosion would have been significantly larger. It was also widely feared that there had been a terrorist attack, with North Korea as the prime suspect. However, because debris from the collapse had not been thrown outward (as they would have been if there was an explosion), this theory was ultimately ruled out.

Once the investigation focused on structural failure, it was initially believed the building's poorly laid foundation and the unstable ground that it was built on led to the failure. Investigation of the rubble revealed that a substandard concrete mix of cement and seawater and poorly reinforced concrete was used for the ceilings and walls.

Further investigation revealed that the building was built with incorrect application of a technique called "flat slab construction". Reinforced concrete buildings are often built by using columns and beams, with the floor slab supported over the full length of the beams. "Flat slab construction" does not use beams but supports the floor slab directly on the columns. The area of floor around the columns must be reinforced in order to carry the load; if the columns are too narrow, they can punch through the slab.

Examination of the building showed the concrete columns installed were only 60 centimetres (24 in) in diameter, below the required 80 centimetres (31 in) shown in the plans. The number of steel reinforcement bars embedded into the concrete was 8, not the required 16, which gave the building only half its needed strength. Steel reinforcements intended to strengthen the concrete floor were placed 10 centimetres (3.9 in) from the top instead of 5 centimetres (2.0 in), decreasing the structure's strength by about another 20%.

Fire shields were installed around all escalators to prevent the spread of fire from floor to floor, but to install them, the support columns were cut, further reducing their diameter. The reduced diameter concentrated the load on a smaller area of the slab, leading to an eventual puncturing of it. Those factors, along with the addition of a fifth floor including restaurants and heavy restaurant equipment, all contributed to the building's eventual failure. The final design had less than half of the required strength but despite this managed to stand for over five years.

Investigators finally pinpointed the direct cause of the collapse, known as the "trigger" or tipping point, in the building's history. It was revealed that two years before the collapse, the building's three rooftop air-conditioning units had been moved because of noise complaints from neighbors on the east side of the building. The building's managers admitted noticing cracks in the roof during the move, but instead of lifting them with a crane, the units were put on rollers and dragged across the roof, further destabilizing the surface by each unit's immense weight.

Cracks formed in the roof slabs and the main support columns were forced downward. Column 5E took a direct hit, forming cracks at the position connected to the fifth-floor restaurants. According to survivor accounts, each time the air conditioners were switched on, the vibrations radiated through the cracks, reaching the supporting columns and widening the cracks, over the course of two years. On the day of the collapse, although the units were shut off, it was too late: the structure had suffered irreversible damage, and the fifth floor slab around column 5E finally gave way.

== Legal ==
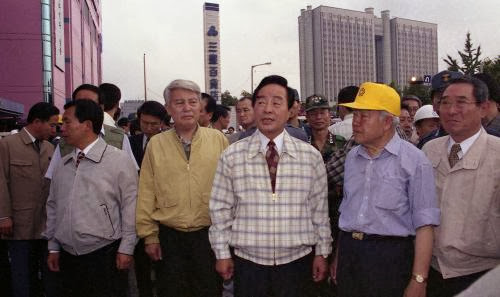
President Kim Young-sam visits the site of the collapse.

=== Trial and prison sentence ===
During his interrogation with Professor Chung, Lee Joon sparked further controversy by saying that his main concern was that the collapse of the store not only harmed the customers, but also inflicted great financial damage to his company. On December 27, 1995, Lee Joon was found guilty of criminal negligence and received a prison sentence of 10 and a half years. Prosecutors originally asked for Lee Joon to be sentenced to 20 years, but was reduced to 7 and a half years on appeal. Lee Joon died on October 4, 2003, months after his release from prison, of complications from diabetes, high blood pressure and kidney disease.

Lee Joon's son and the store's CEO, Lee Han-sang, received seven years for accidental homicide and corruption. Following his release from prison in 2002, Lee Han-sang worked as an evangelist in Mongolia.

City official Lee Chung-Woo, who was a chief administrator of the area where the store was located, was sentenced to three years in jail for bribery. Hwang Chol-Min, a former chief for the area, was found guilty of accepting a ₩12 million bribe from Lee Joon, and was sentenced to 10 years in prison.

Other participating officials, including a former chief administrator of the Seocho district, were also jailed. Other parties sentenced included a number of the store's executives and the company responsible for completing the building.

=== Compensation ===
At first, families of the victims were asking for an average of $361,000 each. The City of Seoul, representing the store's owner, offered to pay $220,000 for each victim, arguing that he could not afford to pay more.

Two months after the collapse, Lee Joon and Lee Han-sang submitted a jointly signed memo to Seoul, offering their entire wealth to compensate the families of the victims. As a result, the Sampoong Group ceased to exist.

The settlement involved 3,293 cases, totaling ₩375.8 billion (about US$300 million). Payouts were complete by 2003.

== Reaction ==
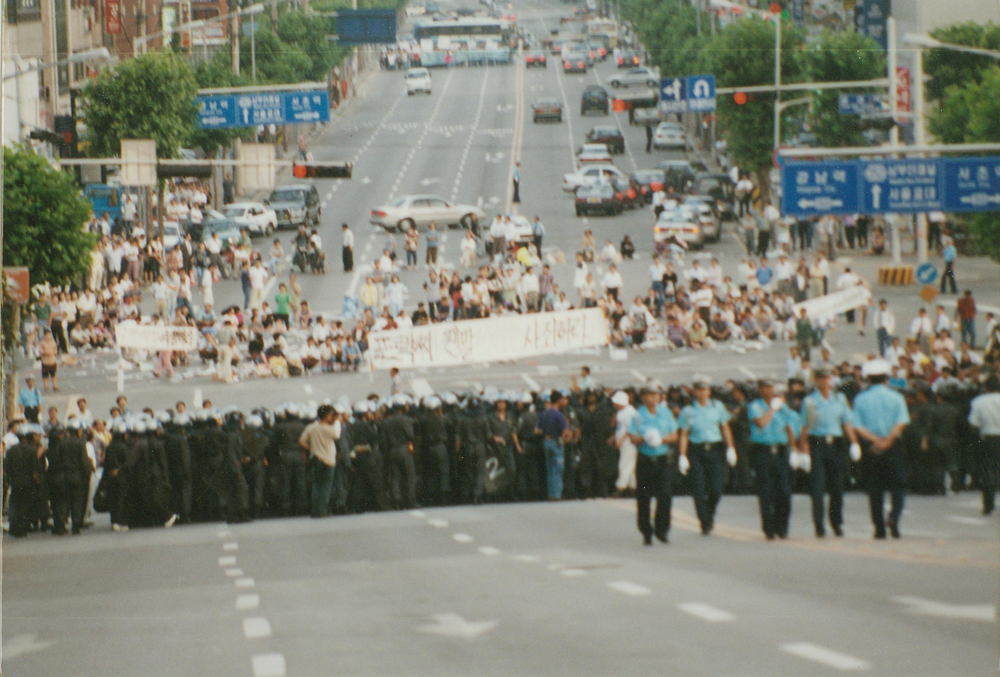
Protest in response to the collapse

The initial reaction of the disaster was an enormous public outrage that led to months of public demonstrations on the streets of Seoul. The collapse was the latest in a series of major disasters that had struck South Korea over the previous few years (including the Seongsu Bridge disaster nine months earlier), which led to skepticism and fears regarding safety standards on other engineering projects undertaken as South Korea had experienced an economic boom during the 1980s, and it resulted in a review of South Korean safety regulations; the disaster also exposed the level of corruption and greed among city officials, who were willing to accept bribes with little regard for public safety.

== Legacy ==
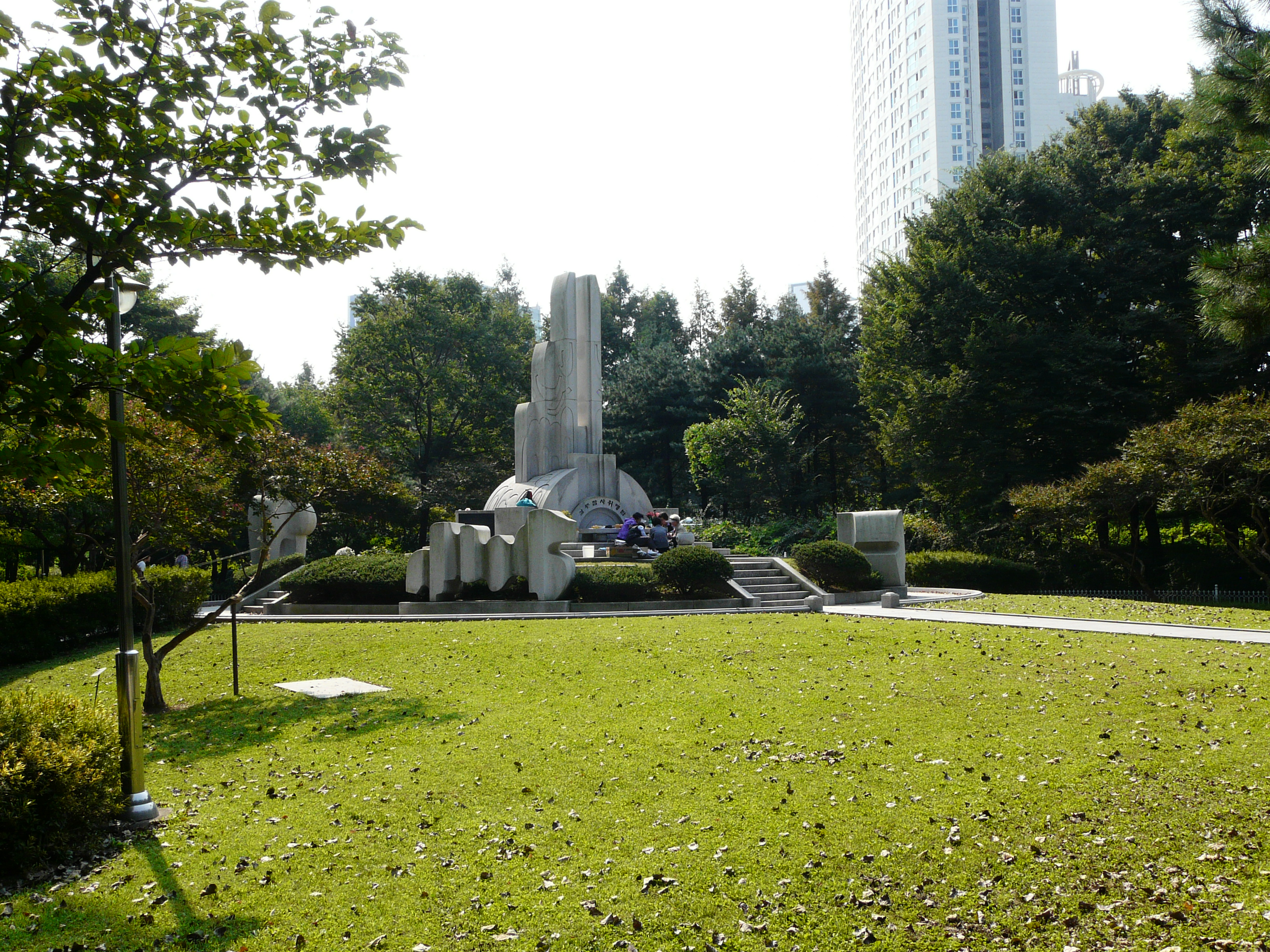
Memorial in remembrance of the collapse.

The remains of the store were demolished shortly after the collapse and the recovery operations; the site remained vacant until 2000. The families of the victims requested that a memorial be built on the site, but it was opposed by the Seochu District government, forcing the Seoul Metropolitan Government to mediate the dispute. In a controversial move, the memorial was built elsewhere and the land sold off to a private developer. The site of the collapse is now home to a luxury apartment complex, Acrovista, the construction of which began in 2001 and was completed in 2004. The impeached former South Korean president Yoon Suk Yeol was a resident of this apartment until moving to the Presidential Residence six months after assuming office.

=== Memorials ===
The Maeheon Citizen's Forest has a sculpture made in memory of the collapse. The 12-metre-high (39 ft) marble memorial was designed by Ewha Womans University professor and sculptor Kim Bong-gu, and funded by the Sampoong Group as compensation to the victims.

== Cultural references ==
=== Documentary ===
- Blueprint for Disaster – "The Sampoong Collapse" (2004)
- Seconds from Disaster – "Sampoong Department Store Collapse" (2006)
- The Echoes of Survivors: Inside Korea's Tragedies (2025)
- Disaster Autopsy - Season 1, Episode 3

=== Film ===
- Judgement (1999)
- Traces of Love (2006)

=== Television ===
- Giant (2010)
- Reply 1994 (2013)
- The Scandal (2013)
- My Daughter, Geum Sa-wol (2016)
- Rain or Shine (2017)
- Black (2017)
- Chocolate (2019)
- When My Love Blooms (2020)
- Move to Heaven (2021)

=== Animation ===
- Hello Jadoo - Season 5, Episode 10 (2023)

== See also ==
- 2013 Rana Plaza factory collapse
- Jaya Supermarket
- Seongsu Bridge disaster
- Surfside condominium collapse
- List of man-made disasters in South Korea
