= Officetel =

South Korean building type

- Hangul: 오피스텔
- Revised Romanization: Opiseutel
- McCune–Reischauer: Op'isŭt'el

In South Korea, an officetel (Korean: 오피스텔, a portmanteau of 'office' and 'hotel') is a multi-purpose building with residential and commercial units. This is a type of studio apartment or studio flat.

An officetel is designed to be a partially self-contained building, such that its occupants can live and work in the same building, minimizing commute time. Because of the convenience of having daily routines located in one building, a significant proportion of the officetel's inhabitants include lawyers, accountants, tax accountants, professors, and artists. Office space is usually parceled out or leased to trading companies and small- to medium-sized businesses.

Officetels are mainly found downtown or around major transportation hubs. As the scale of construction grows over time, officetels tend to offer more commercial and housing features through amenities like sports centers and shopping facilities. After the 1997 Asian financial crisis, the construction of officetels has increased rapidly due to governmental deregulations, and they are now taking a substantial portion of the housing market in the Seoul Metropolitan Area.

== Features ==
Officetel parcels are commonly 50 to 100 m^{2} (540 to 1,080 ft^{2}) in size. Most officetel residential spaces are a studio apartment with bathroom, kitchen, and bed areas. Basic furnishings are usually included with an officetel lease. It is currently illegal to have a tub or balcony in an officetel. Ondol heating systems were initially prohibited, but the Ministry of Territories and Oceans Decree 2010-351 permitted ondol floor heating up to 85 m^{2} (910 ft^{2}).

== History ==
The first officetel was built in Mapo, Seoul by the Korea Development Corporation in 1985. After that, demand increased, so construction companies and housing cooperations took part in the growing the trend of building officetels.

== See also ==
- Goshiwon
