= Won Jin-ah =

South Korean actress (born 1991)

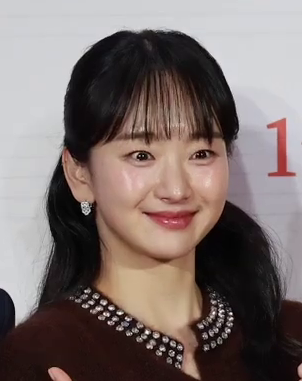
- Won in January 2025
- Born: March 29, 1991 (age 35); Cheonan, South Korea
- Occupation: Actress
- Years active: 2015–present
- Agent: Artist Company

Korean name
- Hangul: 원진아
- RR: Won Jina
- MR: Wŏn China

Won Jin-ah (Korean: 원진아; born March 29, 1991) is a South Korean actress known for her roles in Rain or Shine (2017) and Life (2018). She earned a Baeksang Arts Award nomination for Rain or Shine.

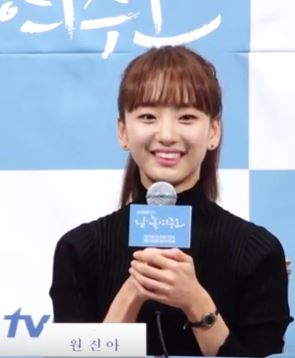
Won in September 2019

== Filmography ==
=== Film ===
Year	Title	Role	Notes	Ref.
2015	Catchball	Jang Min-young	Short film	
2015	The Chosen: Forbidden Cave	Sungjiwon employee		
2015	Secondhand, Paul	Young-ji	Short film	
2015	Now Playing	Schoolyard junior		
2016	No Tomorrow	Suk-hoon's wife		
2016	The Age of Shadows	Nun		
2016	Bye By Bi	Hye-ri	Short film	
2017	Steel Rain	Ryeo Min-kyung		
2019	Money	Park Si-eun		
2019	Long Live The King	Kang So-hyun		
2021	Voice	Mi-yeon		
2021	A Year-End Medley	Baek Lee-young		
2025	Secret: Untold Melody	Yoo Jung-ah		

=== Television series ===
Year	Title	Role	Ref.
2017–2018	Rain or Shine	Ha Moon-soo	
2018	Life	Lee No-eul	
2019	Melting Me Softly	Go Mi-ran	
2021	She Would Never Know	Yoon Song-ah	
2021	Hellbound	Song So-hyun	
2022	Unicorn	Ashley	
2025	The Defects	Kim A-hyeon	
2025	The Judge Returns	Kim Jin-a	

=== Music video appearances ===
Year	Title	Artist	Ref.
2021	"Only"	Lee Hi	

== Theater ==
Year	English title	Korean title	Role	Ref.
2021	Hometown Spring	고향의 봄	Choi Soon-ae	
2023	Faust	파우스트	Gretchen	

== Accolades ==
=== Awards and nominations ===
Name of the award ceremony, year presented, category, nominee of the award, and the result of the nomination
Award ceremony	Year	Category	Nominee / Work	Result	Ref.
APAN Star Awards	2018	Best New Actress	Rain or Shine	Won	
Baeksang Arts Awards	2018	Best New Actress (TV)	Rain or Shine	Nominated	
Chunsa Film Art Awards	2020	Best New Actress	Long Live the King	Nominated	
The Seoul Awards	2018	Best New Actress	Rain or Shine	Nominated	

=== Listicles ===
Name of publisher, year listed, name of listicle, and placement
Publisher	Year	Listicle	Placement	Ref.
Korean Film Council	2021	Korean Actors 200 (Note: Introduces 200 actors that best represent the present and future of Korean cinema to the people in the film industry all over the world.)	Included	
Sports Dong-a	2018	The Star that Will Shine in 2018 (Actor)	Included (Note: Shortlisted with Dong-ha, Kim Seon-ho, Seo Eun-soo, and Ha Jun)	
