= Hasukjib =

Small apartments in South Korea

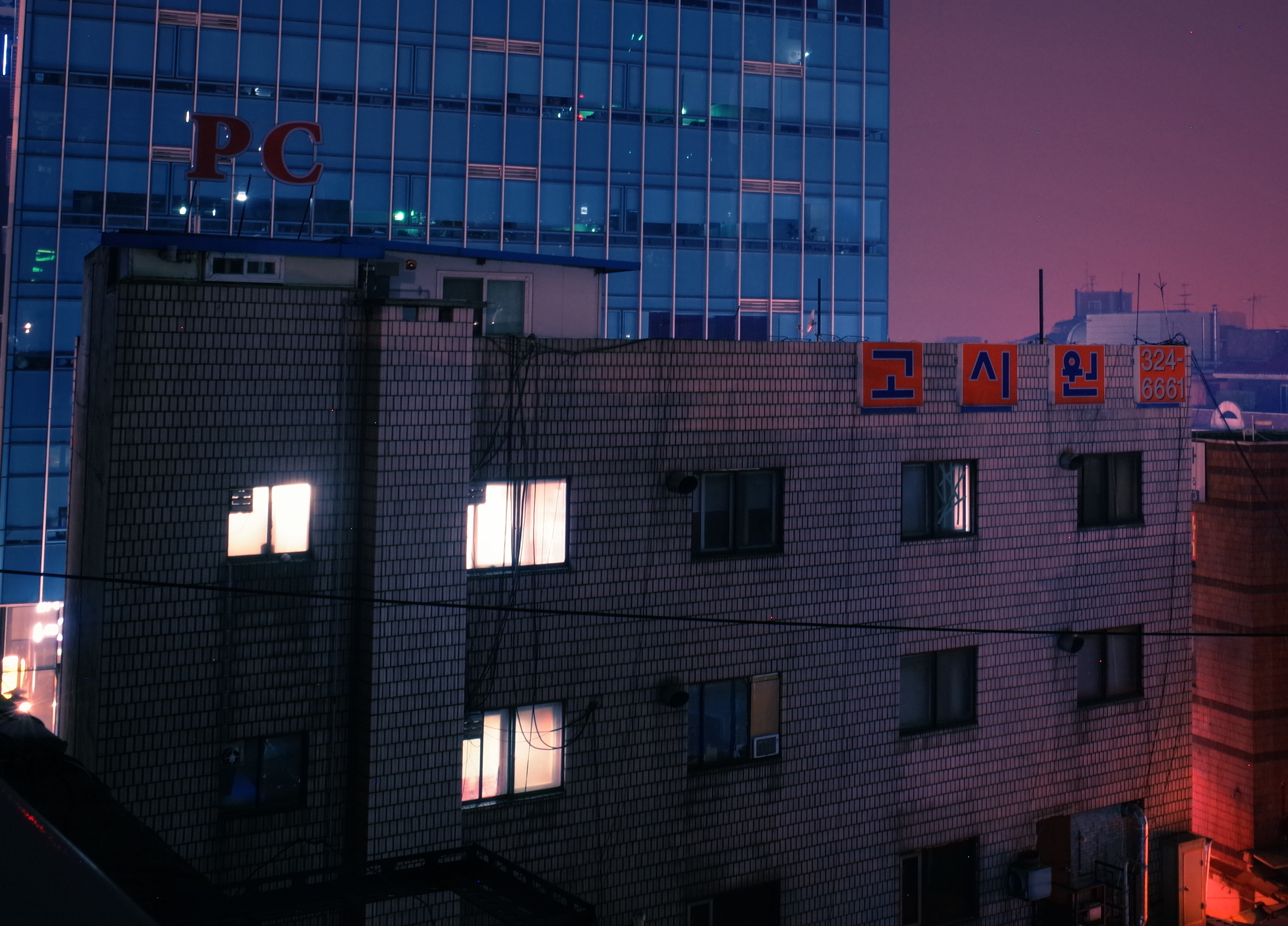
A hasukjib building in Seoul

A hasukjib (Korean: 하숙집; Hanja: 下宿집; lit. "boarding house") is a type of housing in South Korea that is commonly used by working adults but more popular among university students. Typically, hasukjib take the form of a small room with a single bed, desk and a mini fridge. There are several rooms on each floor of the building and usually has a restroom, shower and laundry room shared by the tenants. Meals (specifically breakfast and dinner) are also often provided by the landlord or more commonly a landlady and included in the rent. The rent varies by the size of the rooms and quality of the facilities, but it's generally considered cheap and affordable. Hasukjib are often compared to gosiwon (고시원; also called goshitel 고시텔), a similar form of single-room housing in Korea.

== Conditions ==
Hasukjib are usually offered with a bed, desk, mini fridge and sometimes a television. Facilities such as bathrooms, kitchen, laundry rooms and living rooms are often shared by the tenants, however some hasukjib have their own private bathroom. The rent of hasukjib are determined by the quality of the room, the size, its facilities and whether or not the room is shared. Breakfast and dinner are often included in the rent and served by the owner.

Most hasukjib separate male and female tenants by floor with each floor having its own facilities such as bathrooms and laundry rooms, but some hasukjib are for women only.

Hasukjib are similar to goshiwon (Korean: 고시원) which is another type of housing in South Korea that they are often compared to. While goshiwon are cheaper, hasukjib are larger in size and offer meals, while typically goshiwon do not.

== Location and size ==
Rooms range from being 6.6 m^{2} or less to as large as 13.2 m^{2}, and rent varies by size. Because it typically targets students, they are often found around university areas.

== Issues ==
In 2001, Kim Hoo-ran of Korea JoongAng Daily wrote an article about foreign students living in South Korea where Gu Yeon-hee, the deputy director of the international cooperation division at the Ministry of Education and Human Resources Development stated that students typically resort to hasukjib because of the shortage of dormitory space, but students "report having difficulty adjusting to problems such as a lack of privacy". Lee Seok-jae, a director at the National Institute for International Education Development, also stated that one of the other complaints is "the difficulty finding hasukjib that will accept foreigners".
