= Home =

Residence for humans to live in

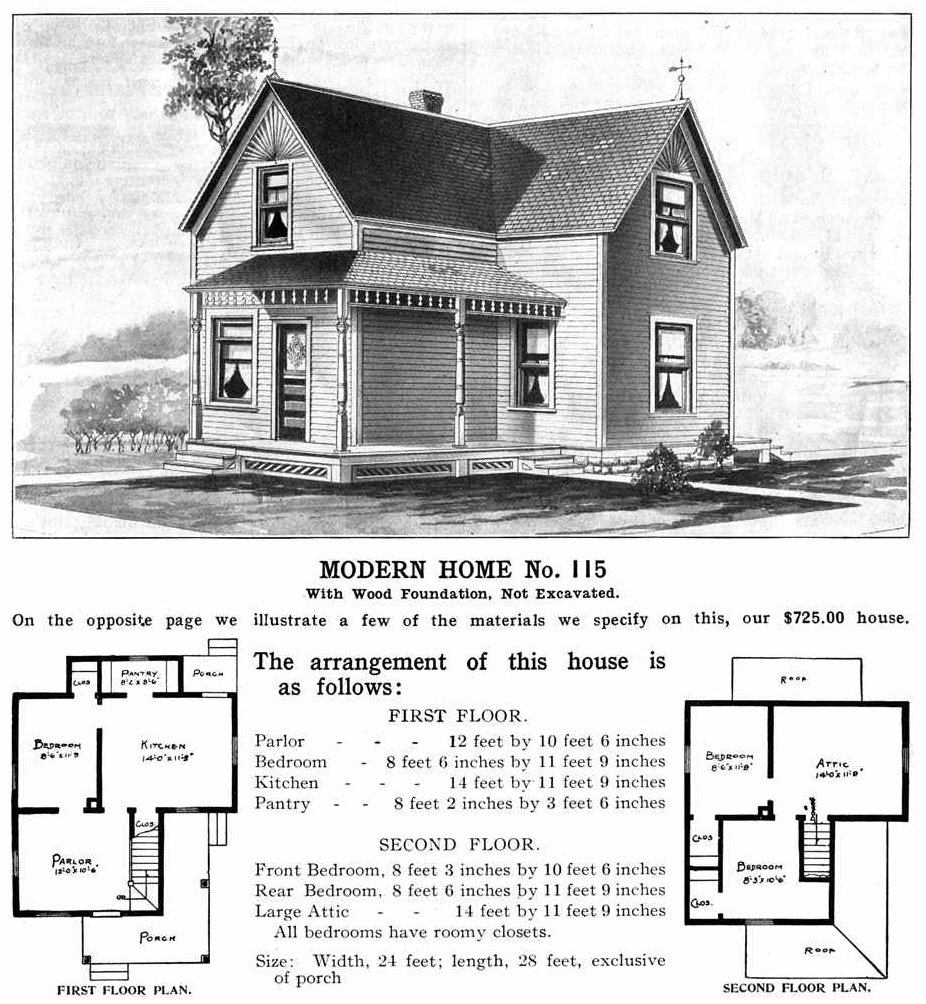
Plans for a detached house showing the social functions for each room

A home, or domicile, is a space used as a permanent or semi-permanent residence for one or more human occupants, and sometimes various companion animals. Homes provide sheltered spaces, for instance rooms, where domestic activity can be performed such as sleeping, preparing food, eating, and hygiene as well as providing spaces for work and leisure such as remote working, studying, and playing.

Physical forms of homes can be static such as a house or an apartment, mobile such as a houseboat, trailer or yurt or digital such as virtual space. The aspect of 'home' can be considered across scales; from the micro scale showcasing the most intimate spaces of the individual dwelling and direct surrounding area to the macro scale of the geographic area such as town, village, city, country or planet.

The concept of 'home' has been researched and theorized across disciplines – topics ranging from the idea of home, the interior, the psyche, liminal space, contested space to gender and politics. The home as a concept expands beyond residence as contemporary lifestyles and technological advances redefine the way the global population lives and works. The concept and experience encompasses the likes of exile, yearning, belonging, homesickness and homelessness.

== History ==
=== Prehistoric ===
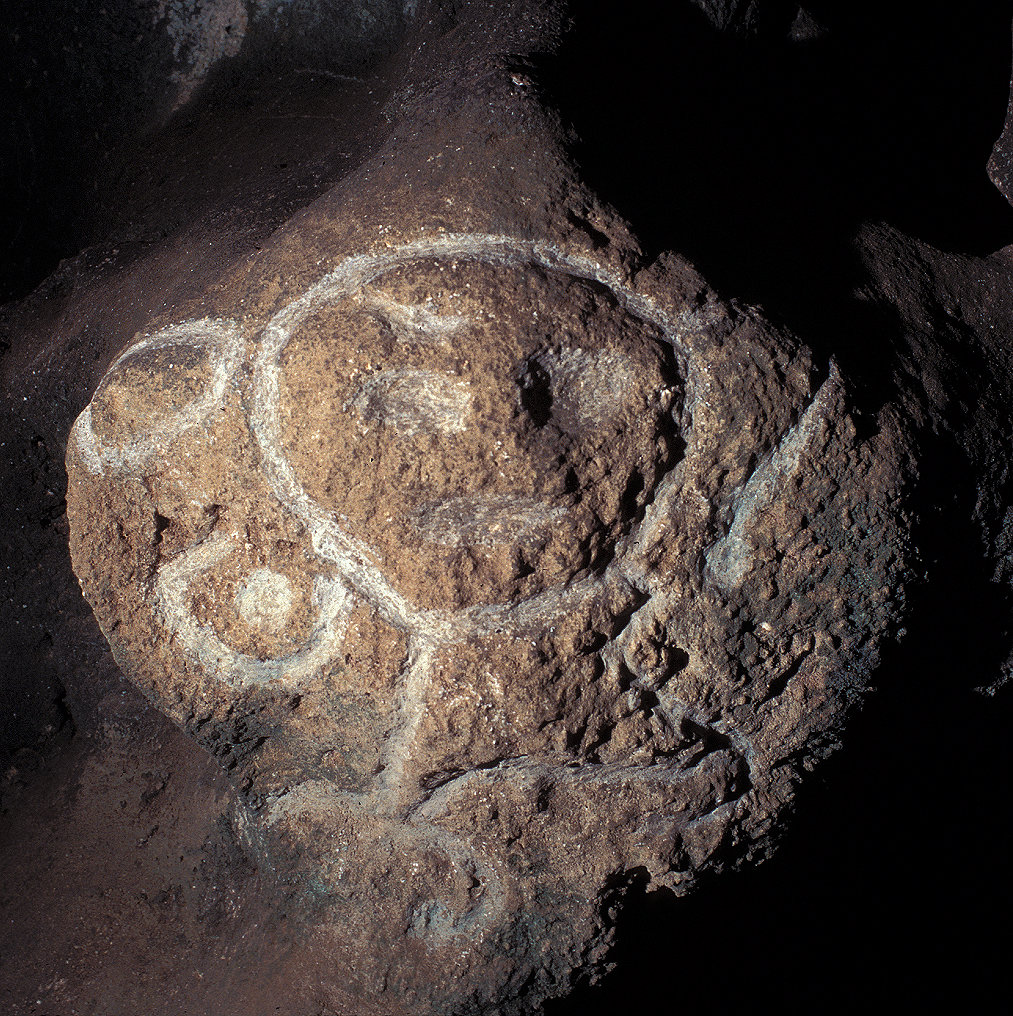
Taíno petroglyphs in a cave in Puerto Rico

The earliest homes humans inhabited were likely naturally occurring features such as caves. There is numerous evidence for early human species inhabiting caves from at least one million years ago, including Homo erectus in China at Zhoukoudian, Homo rhodesiensis in South Africa at the Cave of Hearths (Makapansgat), Homo neanderthalensis and Homo heidelbergensis in Europe at Archaeological Site of Atapuerca, Homo floresiensis in Indonesia, and the Denisovans in southern Siberia.

In southern Africa, early modern humans regularly used sea caves as shelter starting about 180,000 years ago, when they learned to exploit the sea for the first time. The oldest known site is PP13B at Pinnacle Point. This may have allowed rapid expansion of humans out of Africa and colonization of areas of the world such as Australia by 60–50,000 years ago. Throughout southern Africa, Australia, and Europe, early modern humans used caves and rock shelters as sites for rock art, such as those at Giants Castle. Caves such as the yaodong in China were used for shelter; other caves were used for burials (such as rock-cut tombs), or as religious sites (such as Buddhist caves). Among the known sacred caves are China's Cave of a Thousand Buddhas and the sacred caves of Crete. As technology progressed, humans and other hominids began constructing their own dwellings. Buildings such as huts and longhouses have been used for living since the late Neolithic.

=== Ancient ===
By the Bronze Age (c. 3500–1200 BC), communities in Mesopotamia began constructing permanent dwellings of mudbrick; excavations at Uruk and Ubaid reveal single-room and multi-room houses organised around small courtyards, built with uniform bricks and bitumen mortar. These early urban homes often clustered along straight streets and shared common wells and ovens. In Ancient Egypt, from the Old Kingdom (c. 2686–2181 BC) onwards, town layouts at Amarna and Deir el-Medina display mudbrick houses with flat roofs built in dense rows off narrow lanes; typical houses comprised a reception room, private chambers, and a small courtyard used for food preparation and work activities. The Indus Valley Civilisation (c. 2600–1900 BC) featured standardised fired-bricks and sophisticated urban planning in cities like Mohenjo-daro and Harappa, where two-story houses included private wells, indoor bathrooms with drainage, and south-facing courtyards engineered for ventilation in the hot climate.

On Bronze Age Crete, the Minoan palace at Knossos incorporated residential quarters with light wells and lustral basins, reflecting an emphasis on light and ritual purity in domestic space. Surrounding settlements adopted similar rectilinear house plans centered on storage magazines and communal courts. By the 1st century BC in Ancient Rome, the affluent lived in domus—multiroom urban houses built around an atrium and peristyle garden—while the majority resided in multi-story apartment blocks called insulae, often cramped and prone to fire hazards.

=== Post-classical ===
After the fall of the Western Roman Empire in the 5th century, domestic architecture in Europe reverted to simple timber-framed or wattle-and-daub huts, while the elite continued to inhabit stone manor houses with great halls and defensive features. By the 12th century, these manor houses commonly featured a central hall, private solar chambers, and adjoining service wings, reflecting both social hierarchy and the need for local defense. In medieval towns, multi-storey timber-framed "hall houses" with jettied upper floors lined narrow streets, maximizing limited urban plots and providing shelter from street traffic.

Concurrently, in the Islamic world from the 8th century onwards, the inward-facing courtyard house became predominant. Private residences were organized around shaded central courts with water features, mashrabiya screens for ventilation and privacy, and richly decorated plasterwork and tile. In East Asia, the Chinese siheyuan compound—standardized during the Yuan and Ming dynasties—offered multigenerational living around a north–south axis courtyard, with ancillary rooms for servants and extended family.

The Renaissance (14th–17th centuries) brought classical ideals into domestic design. In Florence, the Palazzo Medici Riccardi (begun 1444) introduced rusticated façades, symmetrical floor plans, and internal loggias, while Venetian villas by Palladio emphasized proportion, harmony, and integration with landscaped gardens. Advances in glassmaking allowed larger, clearer windows, and masonry chimneys gradually replaced central hearths, vastly improving light and air quality within homes. From the 14th to the 16th century, homelessness was perceived of as a "vagrancy problem" and legislative responses to the problem were predicated upon the threat it may pose to the state.

=== Modern era ===
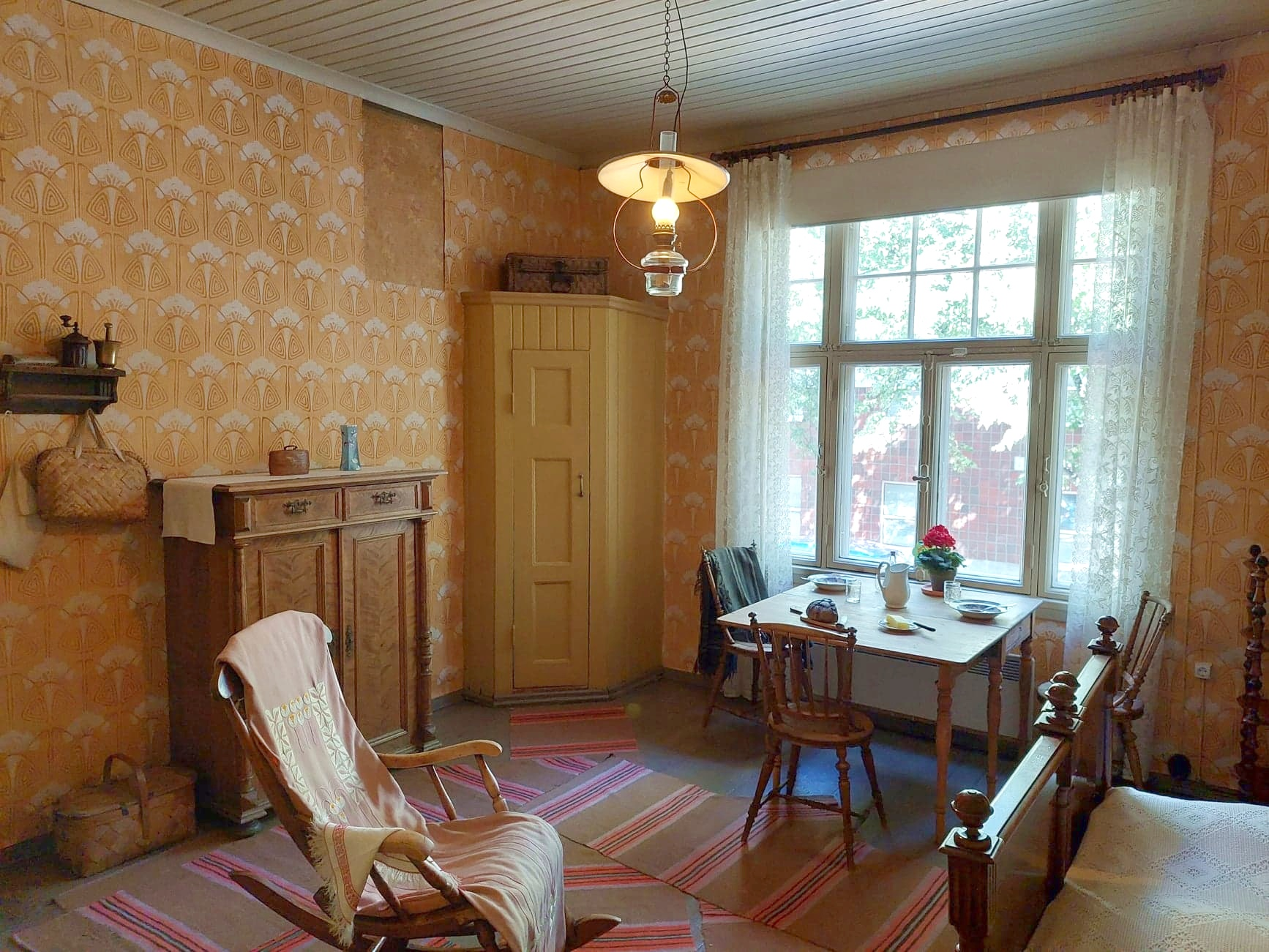
Industrialization brought mass migration to cities. This one-room worker home from Helsinki is typical to late 19th century and early 20th century, often housing large families.

According to Kirsten Gram-Hanssen, "It can be argued that historically and cross-culturally there is not always [a] strong relation between the concept of home and the physical building, and that this mode of thinking is rooted in the Enlightenment of the seventeenth century". Before, one's home was more public than private; traits such as privacy, intimacy and familiarity would proceed to achieve greater prominence, aligning the concept with the bourgeoisie. The connection between home and house was reinforced by a case law declaration from Edward Coke: "The house of everyman is to him as his castle and fortress, as well as his defense against injury and violence, as for his repose". Colloquially, this was adapted into the phrase "The Englishman's home is his castle" which popularised the notion of home as house.

A result of the longstanding association between home and women, 18th century English women, of upper-class status, were scorned for pursuing activities outside of the home, thus seen to be of undesirable character. The concept of home took on unprecedent prominence by the 18th century, reified by cultural practice.

The concept of a smart home arose in the 19th century in turn with electricity having been introduced to homes in a limited capacity. The distinction between home and work formulated in the 20th century, with home acting as sanctuary. Modern definitions portray home as a site of supreme comfort and familial intimacy, operating as a buffer to the greater world.

== Common types ==
The concept of home is one with multiple interpretations, influenced by one's history and identity. People of differing ages, genders, ethnicities and classes may have resultingly different meanings of home. Commonly, it is associated with various forms of abodes such as wagons, cars, boats or tents although it is equally considered to extend beyond the space, in mind and emotion. The space of a home need not be significant or fixed though the boundaries of home are often tied to the space. There have been multiple theories regarding one's choice of home with the residential conditions of their childhood often reflected in their later choice of home. According to Paul Oliver, the vast majority of abodes are vernacular, constructed in accordance with the residents' needs.

=== House ===
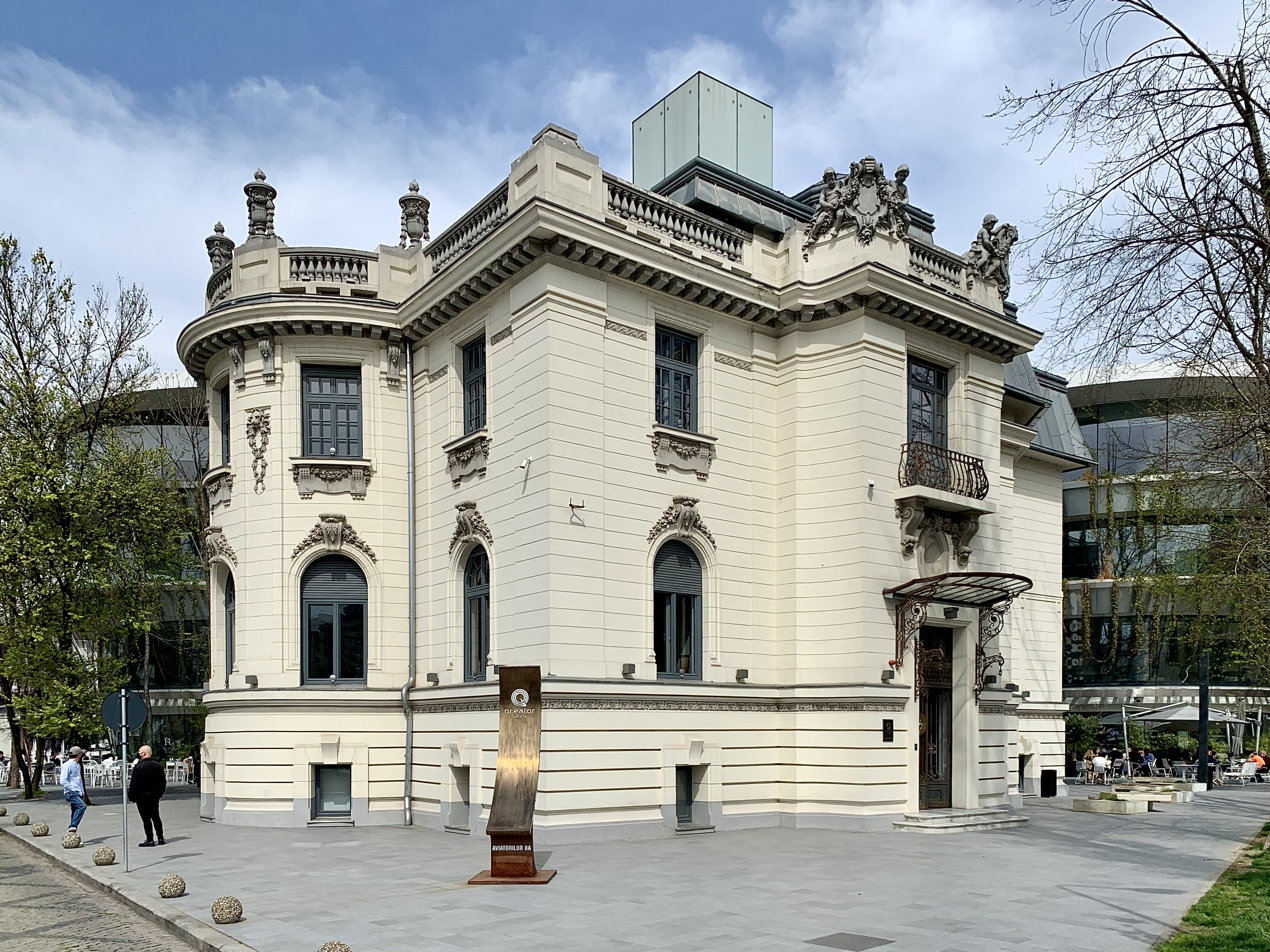
House at 8A, Bulevardul Aviatorilor, Bucharest, Romania

A house is a single-unit residential building. It may range in complexity from a rudimentary hut to a complex structure of wood, masonry, concrete or other material, outfitted with plumbing, electrical, and heating, ventilation, and air conditioning systems.

The social unit that lives in a house is known as a household. Most commonly, a household is a family unit of some kind, although households may also be other social groups, such as roommates or, in a rooming house, unconnected individuals. Some houses only have a dwelling space for one family or similar-sized group; larger houses called townhouses or row houses may contain numerous family dwellings in the same structure. A house may be accompanied by outbuildings, such as a garage for vehicles or a shed for gardening equipment and tools. A house may have a backyard or a front yard or both, which serve as additional areas where inhabitants can relax or eat. Houses may provide "certain activities, which gradually accumulate meaning until they become homes".

Joseph Rykwert distinguished between home and house in their physicality; a house requires a building whereas a home does not. Home and house are often used interchangeably, although their connotations may differ: house being "emotionally neutral" and home evoking "personal, cognitive aspects". By the mid-18th century, the definition of home had extended beyond a house. "Few English words are filled with the emotional meaning of the word home".

=== Moveable structures ===
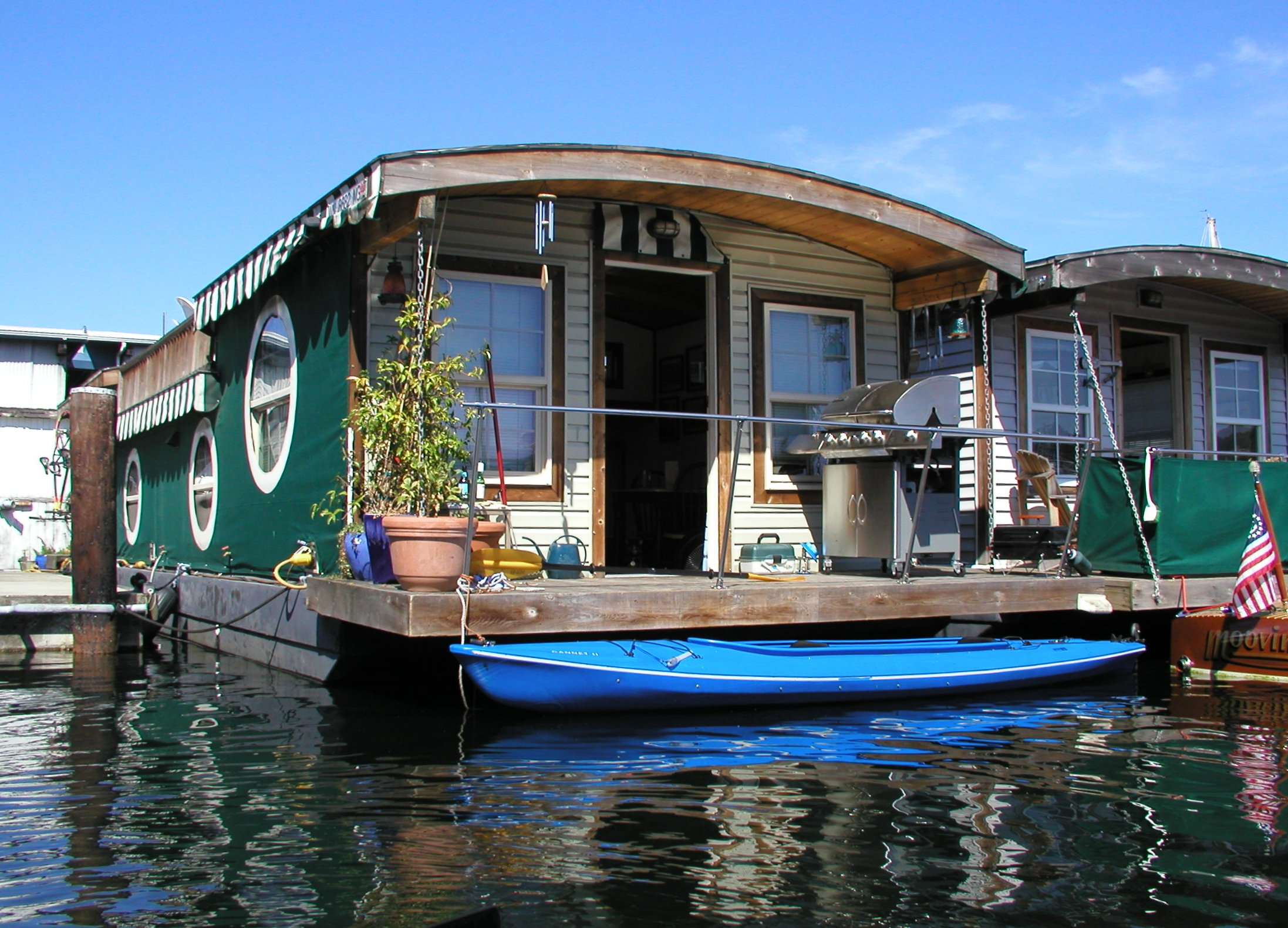
A houseboat on Lake Union in Seattle, Washington, US

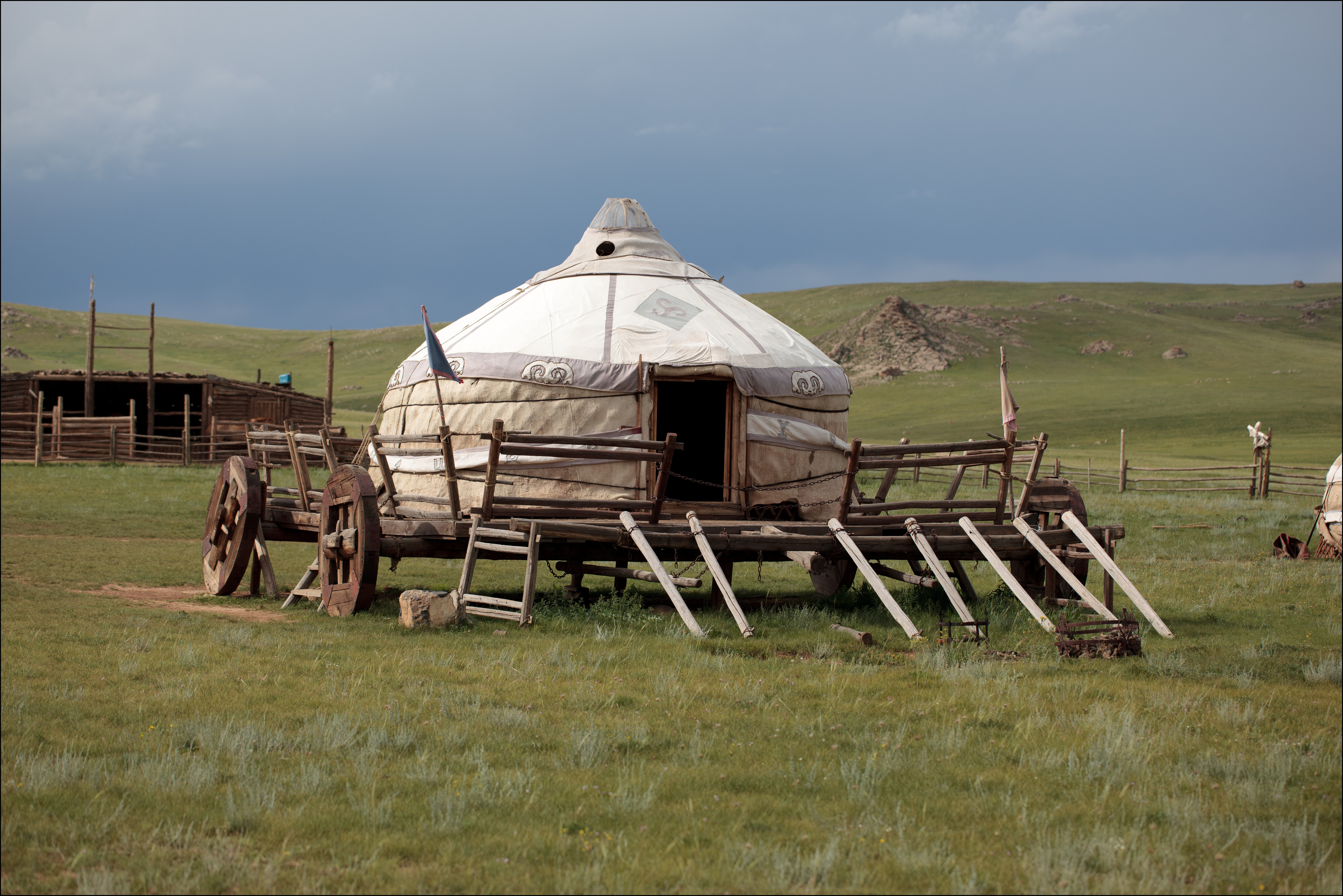
A traditional Kazakh yurt on a wagon

Home as constitutionally mobile and transient has been contended by anthropologists and sociologist. A mobile home (also known as a house trailer, park home, trailer, or trailer home) is a prefabricated structure, built in a factory on a permanently attached chassis before being transported to site (either by being towed or on a trailer). Used as permanent homes, or for holiday or temporary accommodation, they are often left permanently or semi-permanently in one place, but can be moved, and may be required to move from time to time for legal reasons.

A houseboat is a boat that has been designed or modified to be used primarily as a home. Some houseboats are not motorized, because they are usually moored, kept stationary at a fixed point and often tethered to land to provide utilities. However, many are capable of operation under their own power. Float house is a Canadian and American term for a house on a float (raft); a rough house may be called a shanty boat. In Western countries, houseboats tend to be either owned privately or rented out to holiday-goers, and on some canals in Europe, people dwell in houseboats all year round. Examples of this include, but are not limited to, Amsterdam, London, and Paris.

A traditional yurt or ger is a portable round tent covered with skins or felt and used as a dwelling by several distinct nomadic groups in the steppes of Central Asia. The structure consists of an angled assembly or latticework of wood or bamboo for walls, a door frame, ribs (poles, rafters), and a wheel (crown, compression ring) possibly steam-bent. The roof structure is often self-supporting, but large yurts may have interior posts supporting the crown. The top of the wall of self-supporting yurts is prevented from spreading by means of a tension band which opposes the force of the roof ribs. Modern yurts may be permanently built on a wooden platform; they may use modern materials such as steam-bent wooden framing or metal framing, canvas or tarpaulin, plexiglass dome, wire rope, or radiant insulation.

== Management ==
=== Housing cooperative ===
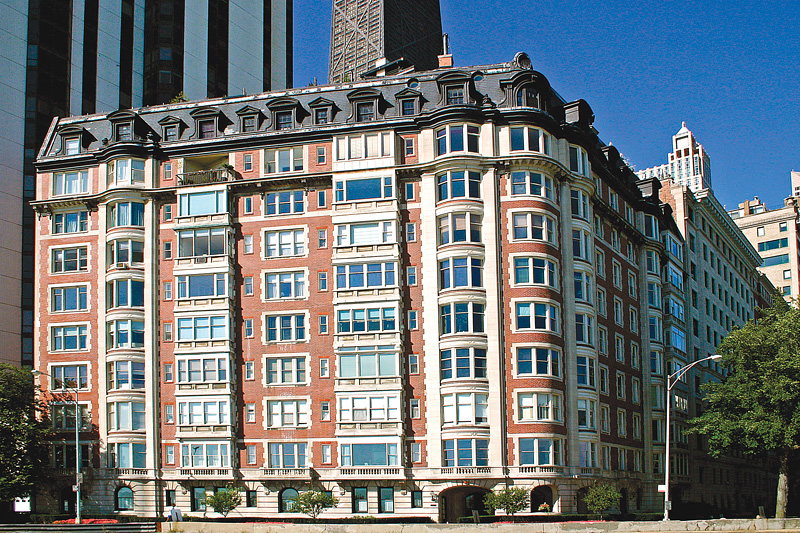
999 N. Lake Shore Drive, a co-op–owned residential building in Chicago, Illinois

A housing cooperative, or housing co-op, is a legal entity which owns real estate consisting of one or more residential buildings. The entity is usually a cooperative or a corporation and constitutes a form of housing tenure. Typically, housing cooperatives are owned by shareholders, but in some cases they can be owned by a non-profit organization. They are a distinctive form of home ownership that have many characteristics that differ from other residential arrangements such as single family home ownership, condominiums and renting.

Housing cooperatives fall into two general tenure categories: non-ownership (referred to as non-equity or continuing) and ownership (referred to as equity or strata). In non-equity cooperatives, occupancy rights are sometimes granted subject to an occupancy or membership agreement, which is similar to a lease. In equity cooperatives, occupancy rights are sometimes granted by way of purchase agreements and legal instruments registered on the title. The corporation's articles of incorporation and bylaws together with the occupancy agreement specify the cooperative's rules.

=== Repair ===
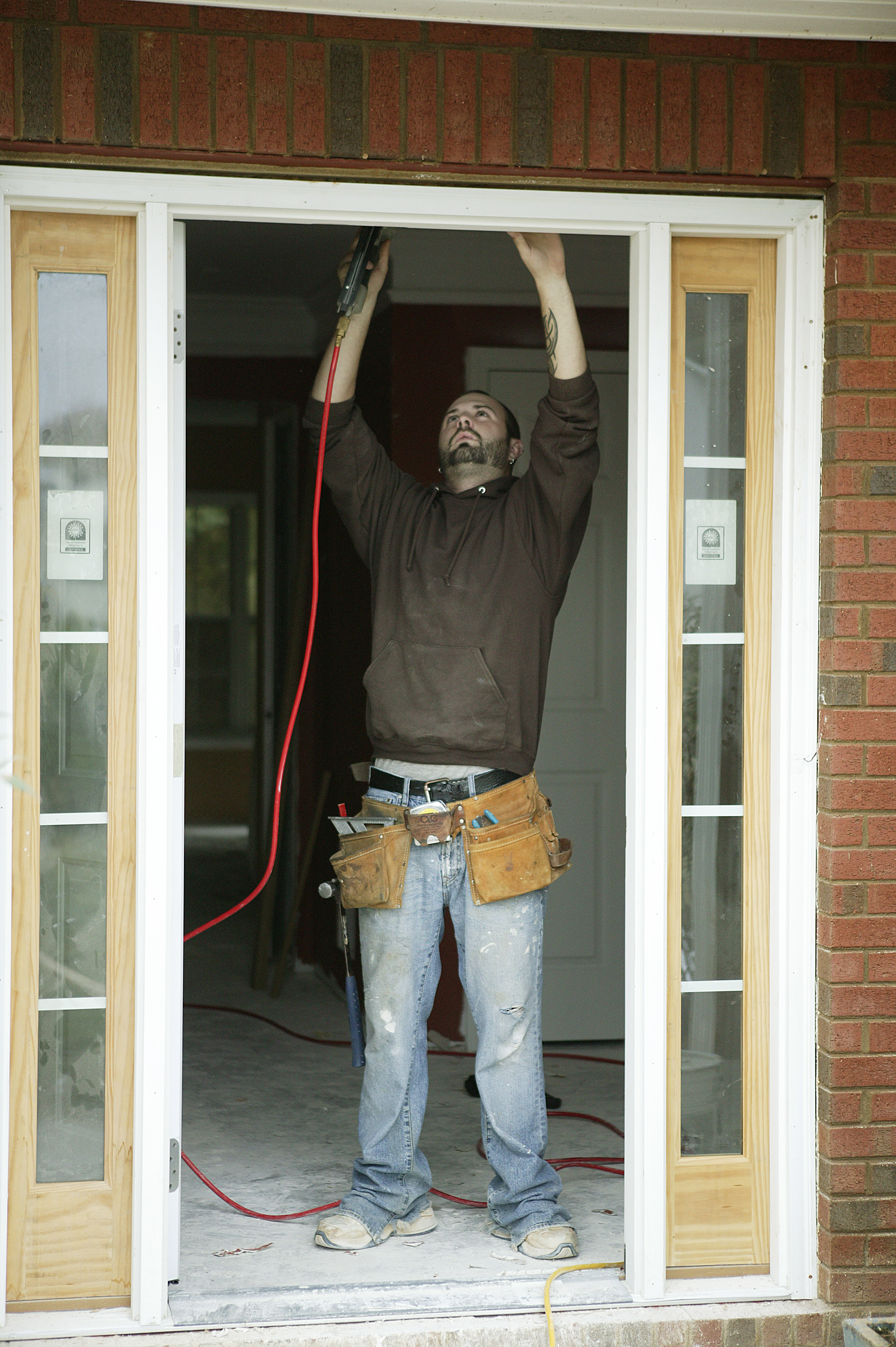
A person making repairs to a house after a flood

Home repair involves the diagnosis and resolution of problems in a home, and is related to home maintenance to avoid such problems. Many types of repairs are "do it yourself" (DIY) projects, while others may be so complicated, time-consuming or risky as to require the assistance of a qualified handyperson, property manager, contractor/builder, or other professionals.

Home repair is not the same as renovation, although many improvements can result from repairs or maintenance. Often the costs of larger repairs will justify the alternative of investment in full-scale improvements. It may make just as much sense to upgrade a home system (with an improved one) as to repair it or incur ever-more-frequent and expensive maintenance for an inefficient, obsolete or dying system.

=== Housekeeping ===
Housekeeping is the management and routine support activities of running and maintaining an organized physical institution occupied or used by people, like a house, ship, hospital, business or factory. The term may refer to cleaning, cooking, organization, shopping, and bill payment. The term is also used to refer to the money allocated for such use. These tasks may be performed by members of the household, or by persons hired for the purpose. In the United States, the term is associated with institutional housekeeping at hotels and resorts but may also refer to domestic housekeeping. Housekeeper is a broader role than a cleaner, who is focused only on the cleaning aspect. The term may also refer to the maintenance of computer storage systems, records, etc.

A housekeeper is a person employed to manage a household and the domestic staff. According to the 1861 Victorian era Mrs. Beeton's Book of Household Management, the housekeeper is second in command in the house and "except in large establishments, where there is a house steward, the housekeeper must consider herself as the immediate representative of her mistress".

Domestic housekeeping refers to housekeeping by or for private households, while institutional housekeeping for commercial and other institutions providing shelter or lodging, such as hotels, resorts, inns, boarding houses, dormitories, hospitals and prisons. Additional concepts include workplace housekeeping and industrial housekeeping, which are part of occupational health and safety processes.

== Tenure ==
Housing tenure is a financial arrangement and ownership structure under which someone has the right to live in a house or apartment. The most frequent forms are tenancy, in which rent is paid by the occupant to a landlord, and owner-occupancy, where the occupant owns their own home. Mixed forms of tenure are also possible.

The basic forms of tenure can be subdivided, for example an owner-occupier may own a house outright, or it may be mortgaged. In the case of tenancy, the landlord may be a private individual, a non-profit organization such as a housing association, or a government body, as in public housing.

Surveys used in social science research frequently include questions about housing tenure, because it is a useful proxy for income or wealth, and people are less reluctant to give information about it.

=== Owner-occupancy ===
Owner-occupancy or home-ownership is a form of housing tenure in which a person, called the owner-occupier, owner-occupant, or home owner, owns the home in which they live. The home can be a house, such as a single-family house, an apartment, condominium, or a housing cooperative. In addition to providing housing, owner-occupancy also functions as a real estate investment.

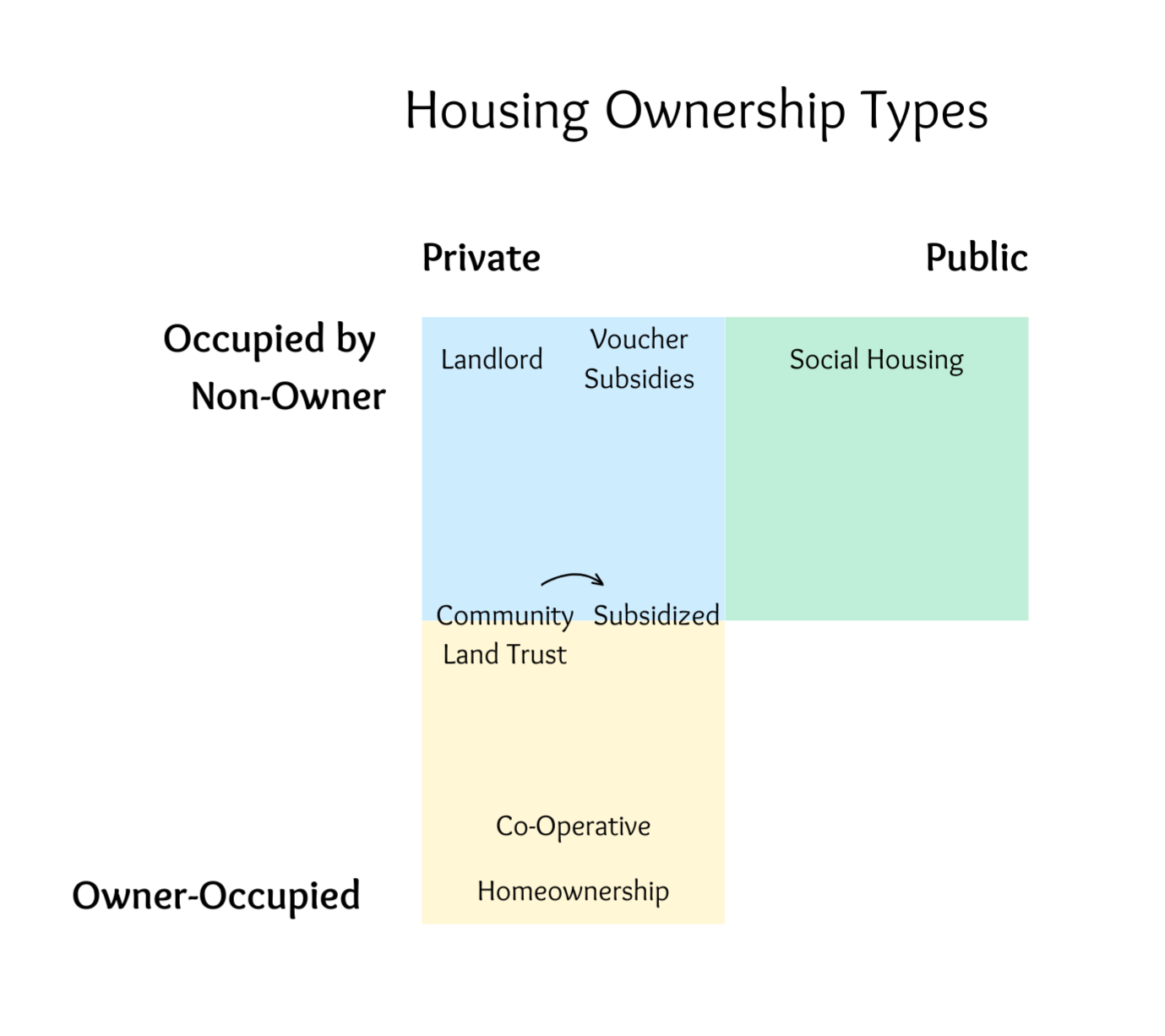
Housing can vary widely in occupant ownership status and public investment.

=== Rental accommodation ===
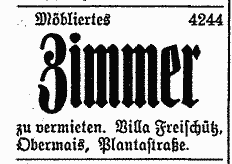
Notice of renting availability at the Villa Freischütz in Meran in 1911

Renting, also known as hiring or letting, is an agreement where a payment is made for the use of a good, service or property owned by another over a fixed period of time. Typically a written agreement is signed to establish the roles and expectations of both the tenant and landlord. There are many different types; a rental agreement tends to refer to short-term rental, whereas lease refers to longer-term rental, also known as leasing.

=== Squatting ===
Squatting is the action of occupying an abandoned or unoccupied area of land or a building (usually residential) that the squatter does not own, rent or otherwise have lawful permission to use. Squatting typically occurs when people find empty buildings or land to occupy for housing.

In developing countries and the least developed countries, shanty towns often begin as squatted settlements. In African cities such as Lagos, much of the population lives in slums. There are pavement dwellers in India and in Hong Kong as well as rooftop slums. Informal settlements in Latin America are known by names such as villa miseria (Argentina), pueblos jóvenes (Peru) and asentamientos irregulares (Guatemala, Uruguay). In Brazil, there are favelas in the major cities and land-based movements in rural areas.

In industrialized countries, there are often residential squats and also left-wing squatting movements, which can be anarchist, autonomist or socialist in nature, for example in the United States. Oppositional movements from the 1960s and 1970s created freespaces in Denmark, the Netherlands and the self-managed social centres of Italy. Each local situation determines the context: in England and Wales, there were estimated to be 50,000 squatters in the late 1970s; in Athens, Greece, there are refugee squats. In Spain and the US, the 2010s saw many new squats following the 2008 financial crisis.

=== Homelessness ===
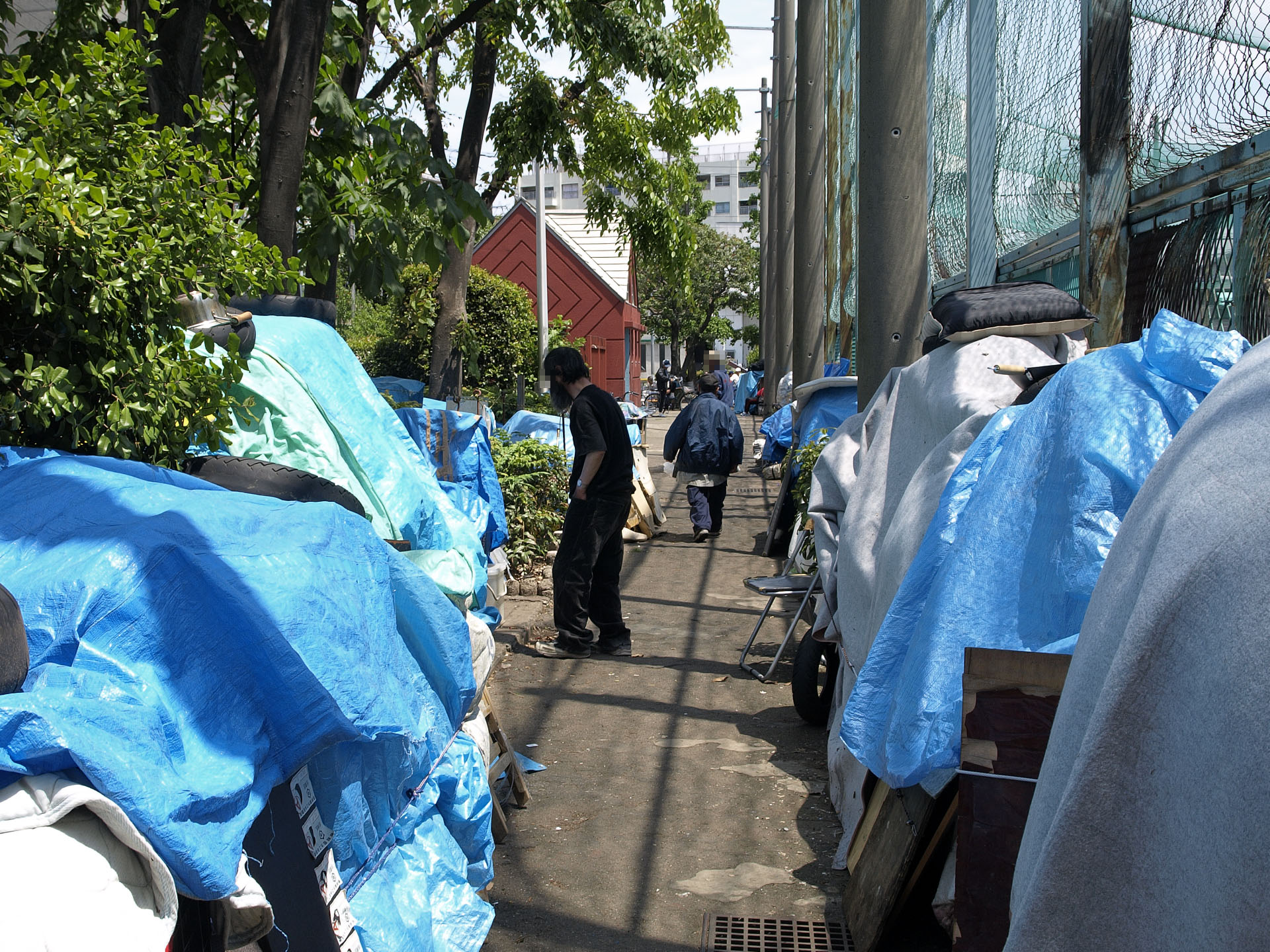
Homeless people in San'ya district, Tokyo, Japan

The state of being without a home can occur in many ways, ranging from the upheavals of natural disasters, fraud, theft, arson, or war-related destruction, to the more common voluntary sale, loss for one or more occupants on relationship breakdown, expropriation by government or legislated cause, repossession or foreclosure to pay secured debts, eviction by landlords, disposal by time-limited means – lease, or absolute gift. Jurisdiction-dependent means of home loss include adverse possession, unpaid property taxation and corruption such as in circumstances of a failed state.

Personal insolvency, development or sustaining of mental illness or severe physical incapacity without affordable domestic care commonly lead to a change of home. The underlying character of a home may be debased by structural defects, natural subsidence, neglect or soil contamination. Refugees are people who have fled their homes due to violence or persecution. They may seek temporary housing in a shelter, or claim asylum in another country in an attempt to relocate permanently. A dysfunctional home life commonly precipitates one's homelessness.

The dichotomy between home and homelessness is to the extent that the concept of home, scholars have said, is dependent on homelessness: "in a sense, without homelessness, we would not be concerned with what home means".

== Anthropogenic significance ==
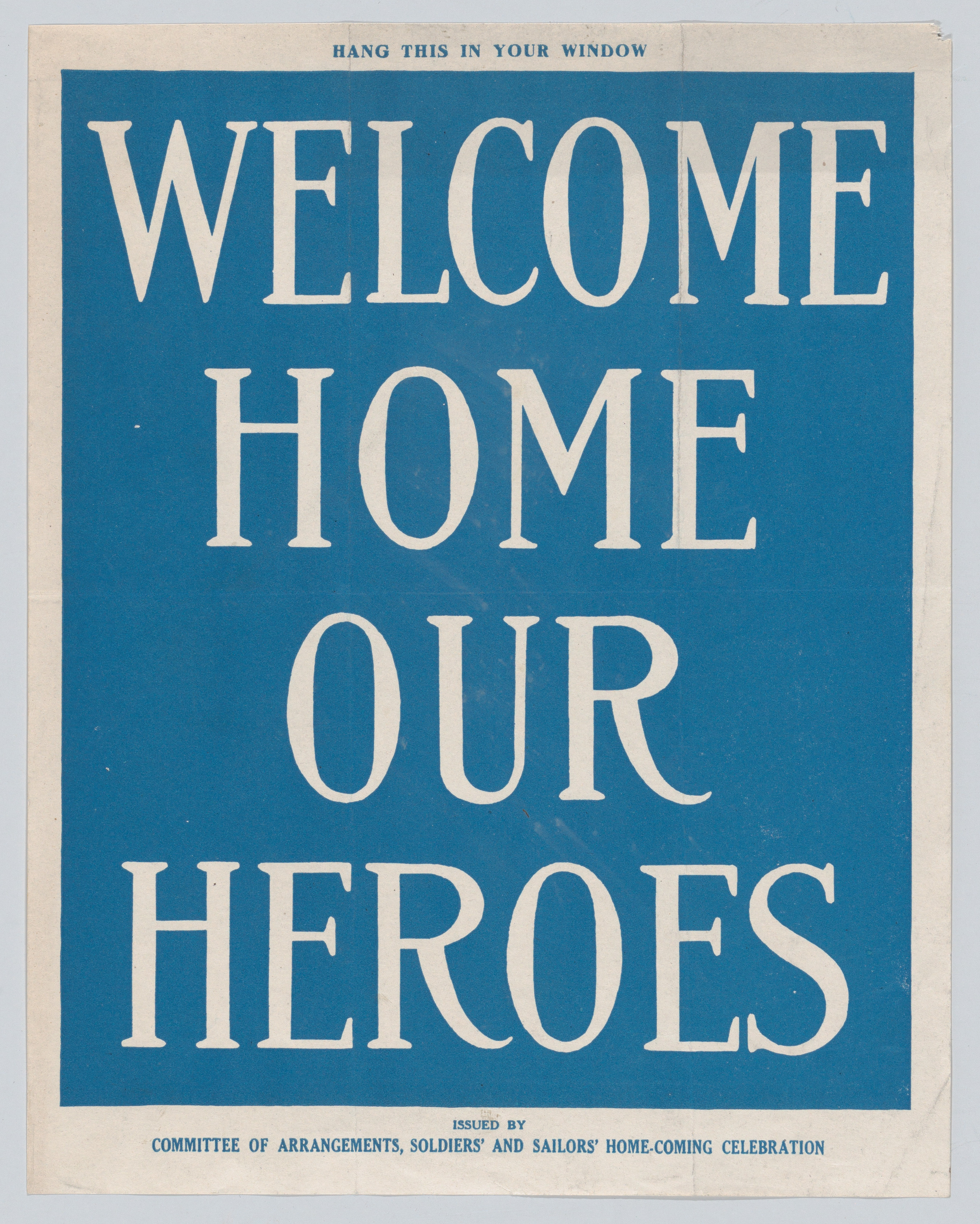
A celebratory poster for soldiers and marines returning home

The connection between humans and dwelling is profound, such that, the likes of Gaston Bachelard and Martin Heidegger consider it an "essential characteristic" of humanity. A home is generally a place that is close to the heart of the owner, and can become a prized possession. It has been argued that psychologically "The strongest sense of home commonly coincides geographically with a dwelling. Usually, the sense of home attenuates as one moves away from that point, but it does not do so in a fixed or regular way." A person's conception of home can be dependent on congealing conditions, such as culture, geography or emotion; the sense of being at home may be contingent upon the presence of multiple emotions, such as joy, sorrow, nostalgia and pride. Further psychological interperation contends that homes serve the purpose of satisfying identity-based desires and expression and that it functions as a "symbol of the self", bound to the events of one's life. Emmanuel Levinas wrote of home as where, upon seclusion from the greater world, a sense of self can be regained.

There exist many connotations regarding the concept of a home, including of security, identity, ritual and socialisation, varied definitions and residents may associate their home with meanings, emotions, experiences and relationships. Home has been described as an "essentially contested concept". Common connotations of home are espoused by both those with or without a home. It is the sociality and action of homes which some scholars have said conditions a house in to a home, which is, according to Gram-Hanssen, "a phenomenon made by its residents". Dysfunctional sociality may negate the sense of a residence being a home whereas the physical contents may endow the sense; alienated from home one may feel "metaphorically homeless". (Note: Alienation based sense of homelessness can extend to nations and communities; Bell Hooks wrote of an African-American sense of homeless in the American South.) Romantic or nostalgic notions are typical in the conceptions of "ideal homes", at once a cultural and individual concept. An ideal working-class home in Postwar Britain was one of comfort and cleanliness, plentiful with food and compassion.

In modern America, an owned house has greater cachet as a home than other residences; debate exists as to if a rooming house can provide a home. Some housing scholars have contended that a conflation of house and home is the result of popular media and capitalist interest. Differing cultures may perceive the concept of a home differently, ascribing less value to the privacy of a residence or the residence itself – although housing issues have been seen as of great concern to immigrants. (Note: The word for home may not be present in all cultures and languages.) The home can render to men and women in significant differences: men conditioned to experience great control and little labour and vice versa for women; homelessness too can be subject to differences per gender. Sociologist Shelley Mallett preposed the idea of home as abstractions: space, feeling, praxis or "a way of being in the world". Abstract notions of home are present in the proverb "A house is not a home".

A video showing a child in Port Harcourt, Nigeria aspiring for a future home

Since it can be said that humans are generally creatures of habit, the state of a person's home has been known to physiologically influence their behavior, emotions, and overall mental health. Marianne Gullestad wrote of the home as the center of and as an attempt to amalgamate everyday life; one's conduct there, she said, can reflect greater culture or social values, such as gender roles insinuating the home to be the domain of women. (Note: Research showcases that "women's attachment to home is more pronounced than men's and increases with the length of time spent at home".) To be homesick is to desire belonging, said Zygmunt Bauman. Places like homes can trigger self-reflection, thoughts about who someone is or used to be or who they might become. These types of reflections also occur in places where there is a collective historical identity, such as Gettysburg or Ground Zero. The time spent with one's home is a considerable element in establishing one's attachment. Those without significant time spent of their life in a residence often struggle to consider home as a feature of residences. The perception of one's home can extend beyond the residence itself, to their neighbourhood, family, workplace or nation and one may feel as though they have multiple homes; to have felt at home beyond residence can be a significant element in one's appraisal of their life, a time in which notions of home, it has been observed, are more profound. The connection between home and family is pertinent, to the extent that some scholars consider the terms to be synonymous.

== See also ==
- Human habitats (Category)
- Ancestral home
- ARCHIVE Global
- Home automation
- Home network
- Home improvement
- Home repair
- Homemaking
- Housing
- List of countries by home ownership rate
- List of human habitation forms
- Show house
- United Nations Human Settlements Programme
