= Roommate =

Person with whom one shares a living facility

Roommates in a Niagara Falls, New York boardinghouse, 1943

A roommate is a person with whom one shares a living facility such as a room or dormitory except when being family or romantically involved. Similar terms include dorm-mate, suite-mate, housemate, or flatmate ("flat": the usual term in British English for an apartment). Flatmate is the term most commonly used in New Zealand, when referring to the rental of an unshared room within any type of dwelling. Another similar term is sharemate (shared living spaces are often called sharehouses in Australia and other Commonwealth countries). A sharehome is a model of household in which a group of usually unrelated people reside together, including lease-by-room arrangements. The term generally applies to people living together in rental properties rather than in properties in which any resident is an owner occupier. In the United Kingdom, the term "roommate" means a person sharing the same bedroom; in the United States and Canada, "roommate" and "housemate" are used interchangeably regardless of whether a bedroom is shared, although at US universities having a roommate commonly implies sharing a bedroom. This article uses the term "roommate" in the US sense of a person one shares a residence with who is not a relative or significant other. The informal term for roommate is roomie, which is commonly used by university students and members of the younger generation.

The most common reason for sharing housing is to reduce the cost of housing. In many rental markets, the monthly rent for a two- or three-bedroom apartment is proportionately less per bedroom than the rent for a one-bedroom apartment (in other words, a three-bedroom flat costs more than a one-bedroom, but not three times as much). By pooling their monthly housing money, a group of people can achieve a lower housing expense at the cost of less privacy. Other motivations are to gain better amenities than those available in single-person housing, to share the work of maintaining a household, and to have the companionship of other people.

People become roommates when they move into a rental property, with one or more of them having applied to rent the property through a real estate agent, being accepted and having signed a lease.

== Demographics ==
Housemates and roommates are typically unmarried young adults, including workers and students. It is not rare for middle-aged and elderly adults who are single, divorced, or widowed to have housemates. Married couples, however, typically discontinue living with roommates, especially when they have children.

Those moving to another city or another country may decide to look for a shared house or apartment to avoid loneliness. Social changes such as the declining affordability of home ownership and decreasing marriage rates are reasons why people may choose to live with roommates. Despite this rise, shared housing is little researched.

Roommates are a fairly common point of reference in Western culture. In the United States, most young adults spend at least a short part of their lives living with roommates after they leave their family's home. Very often this involves moving out of the home and to college, where the primary option for living is with a roommate. Therefore, many novels, movies, plays, and television programs employ roommates as a basic principle or a plot device (such as the popular series Friends or The Big Bang Theory). Sharing a house or a flat is also very common in European countries such as France (French colocation, corenting) or Germany (German WG for Wohngemeinschaft, living [together] community). Many websites are specialized in finding a flatmate. On the other hand, it is less common for people of any age to live with roommates in some countries, such as Japan, where single-person one-room apartments are plentiful.

There are many different forms of flat shares also, from the more established flat shares where the flatmate will get their own room that is furnished to "couch surfing" where people lend their sofa for a short period. Sharehome residents are typically unrelated to each other in that they generally come from different families, although they may be composed of some siblings and sometimes single parents and their children. Perhaps because of the social cohesion required for their formation, sharehomes will often be composed of members of the same peer group. For example, university students who have relocated to a new area to commence a course of study often need to form a sharehome. Share housing often occurs in the 18–35 age bracket—during a life stage between leaving home and having children. Sharehome residents may have pre-existing friendships or other interpersonal relationships or they may form new relationships whilst living together.

Many universities in the United States require first-year students to live in on-campus residence halls, sharing a dormitory room with a same-sex roommate.

== Popularity ==
According to the American Community Survey, 7.7% of Americans lived with a roommate in 2014. From 2000 to 2014, the proportion of Americans living with roommates increased by 13%, revealing that it is an increasingly common housing situation.

The change in the cost of housing makes the consideration of roommates more attractive. As housing costs rise, so too does the rate of living as roommates. When prices drop, the opposite can be expected. This has been seen extensively in cities such as Washington D.C., Phoenix, and San Diego.

Student exchanges are getting more and more popular with globalization and has influenced a lot in the Roommate Boom. The Erasmus exchange program in Europe has contributed as being the biggest exchange program in Europe. Exchange students can live in university residences but a growing number want to share apartments with other international students in shared apartments.

Roommates and house-sharing are not limited to students and young adults however. American politicians Chuck Schumer, William Delahunt, Dick Durbin, and George Miller famously share a house in Washington, D.C., while Congress is in session.

In Indian universities and colleges it is quite common that students share their rooms with a couple of others. Usually students in the master or doctoral programs are allocated with own rooms.

Sharing a room is quite popular with young adults (most of them university students) in countries like Germany, Austria and Switzerland, while sharing a bedroom is more uncommon.

=== Cities with most roommates in the United States ===
The following table lists the top 25 US cities by proportion of people who live with roommates according to the US Census 2016 and a 2017 Zillow housing trends report.

Rank	City	% Living with roommate
1	Los Angeles, California	45.5%
2	Riverside, California	43.7%
3	Miami, Florida	41.0%
4	New York, New York	40.0%
5	San Jose, California	38.6%
6	San Francisco, California	38.5%
7	San Diego, California	37.9%
8	San Antonio, Texas	38.2%
9	Las Vegas, Nevada	36.4%
10	Orlando, Florida	35.0%
11	Washington, DC	34.6%
12	Baltimore, Maryland	33.4%
13	Sacramento, California	33.1%
14	Philadelphia, Pennsylvania	33.0%
15	Houston, Texas	32.8%
16	Chicago, Illinois	32.4%
17	Boston, Massachusetts	32.3%
18	Phoenix, Arizona	32.2%
19	Atlanta, Georgia	31.7%
20	Austin, Texas	30.4%
21	Dallas, Texas	30.0%
22	Detroit, Michigan	32.2%
23	Tampa, Florida	32.3%
24	Portland, Oregon	32.2%
25	Denver, Colorado	27.1%

== Challenges ==
One difficulty is finding suitable roommates. Living with a roommate can mean much less privacy than having a residence of one's own, and for some people this can cause a lot of stress. Another thing to consider when choosing a roommate is how to divide the cost of living. Who pays for what, or are the shared expenses divided between the two or more roommates. Also, the potential roommate should be trusted to pay their share and trusted to pay it on time. Sleeping patterns can also be disrupted when living with a number of people. Some of the challenges that come with share housing may include advertising for, interviewing and choosing potential housemates; sharing communal household goods, rent (often this may be determined by the size or position of respective bedrooms); sharing household bills and grocery costs; and sharing housework, cleaning, and cooking responsibilities. Conflicts may arise if, for example, residents have different standards of cleanliness, different diets, or different hours of employment or study. Guests and partners may also begin to board frequently, which can raise complications pertaining to utility expenses, additional rent and further possible cleaning duties. Often when these responsibilities go untended, friction may result between co-tenants. For this reason, responsibilities should be delegated and fairly assigned as early as possible in any living arrangement with roommates. A clear and defined list of alternating chores and bill lists are easy to see and enforce.

Roommates matter, as they have a great impression upon the ones whom they live with and therefore surround themselves by. More and more research has been produced in order to properly understand this impact. The areas of impact can vary greatly in both positive and negative ways; most important is that individuals should be aware of the possible behavior and social changes that may happen when living with a roommate.

=== Eating and drinking habits ===
Living with a roommate who exercises and diets can be beneficial because it very often "rubs off" on the other roommates, while a calorie cutting roommate could be a potential negative influence. College is a time that students often start drinking, specifically binge drinking (more than 4 or 5 drinks in a row). By the end of second semester in college 53% of freshman students had binged. Students explained that having a drinking roommate provided a “buddy” to go through it all and was a big influence in the decision to do so.

"Each happy friend a person has increases that person's probability of being happy by 9 percent and each unhappy friend decreases it by 7 percent," says Nicholas A. Christakis, a co-author of "Connected: The Surprising Power of Our Social Networks and How They Shape Our Lives". Whether the roommates are friends or not the interactions and behaviors shared and expressed will undoubtedly have an effect on the roommates. Although shown not to be as impressionable as eating habits, our moods can change, specifically more in roommates based on the others emotions.

A study from Psychology Today showed that having a roommate that plays video games causes the other to most likely participate, which reflected in a half-hour less of studying and GPA's .02 lower than others. When dealing with a college roommate, the choice to study or sleep should take precedence over the choice to party or play loud music. This understanding allows those to choose to focus differently on school to do so without harm to the roommate relationship or grades.

The best approach to address an issue with a roommate is an upfront and in person conversation, preferably a one on one conversation. While approaching the issues understand and respect each other's differences. When discussing the issues allow both sides to express their thoughts and feelings on the issue. After listening and speaking to each other suggest a resolution which assumes a win-win situation and allows for the conflict to be more easily resolved. The resolution may not be the personal idea, but it should help the situation to some degree.

== See also ==
- Co-living
- Cohabitation
- Communal apartment
- Family
- Home
- Household
- Stable roommates problem
- Tenant
