= Renting =

Payment for temporary use; hiring

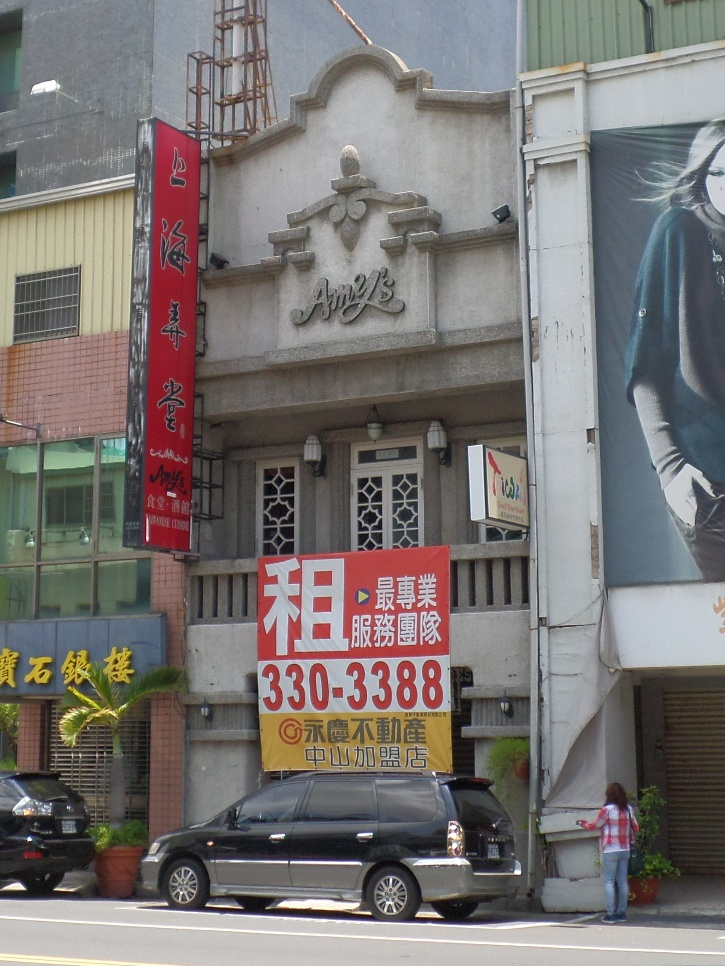
Notice of renting availability of a building in Kaohsiung, Taiwan

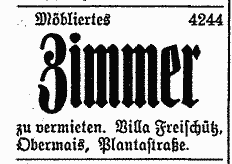
Notice of renting availability at the Villa Freischütz in Meran in 1911

Renting, also known as hiring or letting, is an agreement where a payment is made for the use of a good, service or property owned by another over a fixed period of time. Typically a written agreement is signed to establish the roles and expectations of both the tenant and landlord. There are many different types; a rental agreement tends to refer to short-term rental, whereas lease refers to longer-term rental, also known as leasing.

== History ==
Various types of rent are referenced in Roman law: rent (canon) under the long leasehold tenure of Emphyteusis; rent (reditus) of a farm; ground-rent (solarium); rent of state lands (vectigal); and the annual rent (prensio) payable for the jus superficiarum or right to the perpetual enjoyment of anything built on the surface of land.

== Reasons for renting ==
There are many possible reasons for renting instead of buying, for example:

- Renting by necessity, such as renting a house when one is unable to purchase.
- In many jurisdictions (including India, Spain, Australia, United Kingdom and the United States) rent paid in a trade or business is tax-deductible, whereas rent on a dwelling is not tax-deductible in most jurisdictions.
- Reducing financial risk due to depreciation and transaction costs, especially for real estate which might be needed only for a short amount of time.
- When something is needed only temporarily, as in the case of a special tool, a truck or a skip.
- When something is needed that may or may not be already owned but is not in proximity for use, such as renting an automobile or bicycle when away on a trip.
- Needing a cheaper alternative to buying, such as renting a movie: a person is unwilling to pay the full price for a movie, so they rent it for a lesser price but give up the chance to view it again later.
- The tenant may want to leave the burden of upkeep of the property (mowing the lawn, shovelling snow, etc.) to the owner or their agents.
- There is no need to worry about lifespan and maintenance, particularly with goods.
- Renting keeps off-balance-sheet the debt that would burden the balance sheet of a company in case the property would have been bought.
- Renting is good for the environment if products are used more efficiently by maximizing utility rather than being disposed of, overproduced and underutilized.
- Risks aside, renting has the potential to generate a regular stream of revenue for the owner. The more the churn (the number of times the item is rented out) the higher the income. Eventually, the rental income crosses the product procurement value and every churn post that becomes a profit for the owner
- Renting often also becomes an alternate revenue pool for idle inventory vs. overly depending on a stagnant / slowing retailing business environment

== Growth of rental industry ==
As of 2008, short-term rental of all sorts of products (excluding real estate and holiday apartments) represented an estimated €108 billion ($160 billion) annual market in Europe and was expected to grow further as the internet would make it easier to find specific items available for rent. According to a 2009 poll by YouGov, 76% of people looking to rent would go to the internet first to find what they need; rising to 88% for those aged 25–34.

The Great Recession may have contributed to the rapid growth of online rental marketplaces, such as Erento, since consumers are more likely to consider renting instead of buying in times of financial hardship. Environmental concerns, fast depreciation of goods, and a more transient workforce also meant that consumers were increasingly searching for rentals.

A 2010 US survey found 27% of renters planned to never buy a home.

=== Rental investment ===
Net income received, or losses suffered, by an investor from renting of properties is subject to idiosyncratic risk due to the numerous things that can happen to real property and variable behavior of tenants.

== Rental agreements ==
There is typically an implied, explicit, or written rental agreement or contract involved to specify the terms of the rental, which are regulated and managed under contract law.

Examples include letting out real estate (real property) for the purpose of housing tenure (where the tenant rents a residence to live in), parking space for a vehicle(s), storage space, whole or portions of properties for business, agricultural, institutional, or government use, or other reasons.

When renting real estate, the person(s) or party who lives in or occupies the real estate is often called a tenant, paying rent to the owner of the property, often called a landlord (or landlady). The real estate rented may be all or part of almost any real estate, such as an apartment, house, building, business office(s) or suite, land, farm, or merely an inside or outside space to park a vehicle, or store things all under Real estate law.

The tenancy agreement for real estate is often called a lease, and usually involves specific property rights in real property, as opposed to chattels.

In India, the rental income on property is taxed under the head "income from house property". A deduction of 30% is allowed from total rent which is charged to tax.

The time use of a chattel or other so called "personal property" is covered under general contract law, but the term lease also nowadays extends to long term rental contracts of more expensive non-Real properties such as automobiles, boats, planes, office equipment and so forth. The distinction in that case is long term versus short term rentals. Some non-real properties commonly available for rent or lease are:

- motion pictures on VHS or DVD, of audio CDs, of computer programs on CD-ROM.
- transport equipment, such as an automobile or a bicycle.
- ships and boats, in which case rental is known as chartering, and the rent is known as hire or freight (depending on the type of charter)
- aircraft, in which case rental is known as chartering, or leasing if the rental is longer term
- specialized tools, such as a chainsaw, laptop, IT equipment or something more substantial, such as a forklift.
- large equipment such as cranes, oil rigs and submarines.
- a deckchair or beach chair and umbrella.
- furniture
- designer handbags, jewelry, sunglasses and watches.
- Home appliances such as washing machines, refrigerators, televisions, microwave ovens, and air-conditioning units

In various degrees, renting can involve buying services for various amounts of time, such as staying in a hotel, using a computer in an Internet cafe, or riding in a taxicab (some forms of English use the term "hiring" for this activity).

As seen from the examples, some rented goods are used on the spot, but usually they are taken along; to help guarantee that they are brought back, one or more of the following applies:

- one shows an identity document
- one signs a contract; any damage already present when renting may be noted down to avoid that the renter is blamed for it when the good is returned
- one pays a damage deposit (a refundable fee that may be used in part to pay for damage caused by the renter)

If the customer has a credit account with the rental company, they may rent over several months (or years) and will receive a recurring or continuation invoice each rental period until they return the equipment. In this case deposits are rarely required.

In certain types of rental (sometimes known as operated or wet rental) the charge may be calculated by the rental charge + timesheets of operators or drivers supplied by the rental company to operate the equipment. This is particularly relevant for crane rental companies.

Sometimes the risk that the good is kept is reduced by it being a special model or having signs on it that cannot easily be removed, making it obvious that it is owned by the rental company; this is especially effective for goods used in public places, but even when used at home it may help due to social control.

Persons and businesses that regularly rent goods from a particular company generally have an account with that company, which reduces the administrative procedure (transaction costs) on each occasion.

Signing out books from a library could be considered renting when there is a fee per book. However the term lending is more common.

== Leasing ==
Rental of personal property or real property for periods often longer than a year, which is governed by the signing of a lease, is known as leasing. Leasing is usually used for high-value capital equipment, both in business and by consumers. A lease in which the renter benefits from an increase in value of the asset is known as a finance lease. A leasing agreement which is not a finance lease is known as an operating lease. In housing, when a tenant rents an apartment but only pays for their room and the common space is a lease-by-room arrangement.

== Rent to own ==
A rental agreement may provide for the renter or lessee to become the owner of the asset at the end of the rental period, usually at the renter's option on payment of a nominal fee. Such arrangements may be known as

- Rent-to-own, a term used in the United States for rental of furniture or appliances. The term is also used in the US for real estate transactions, where the tenant has an option to purchase the property at a fixed price at a specified future time. Such arrangements are also known as lease-option, lease-to-own or lease to purchase option.
- Hire purchase, used in the UK and other countries for the purchase of cars, other consumer equipment and business equipment. The term lease-purchase is also used.
- Closed-end leasing, used in the US and Canada for the leasing of cars. Unlike in hire purchase, the asset is sold at its residual value at the end of the term, rather than for a nominal amount.
