= Kirsten Gram-Hanssen =

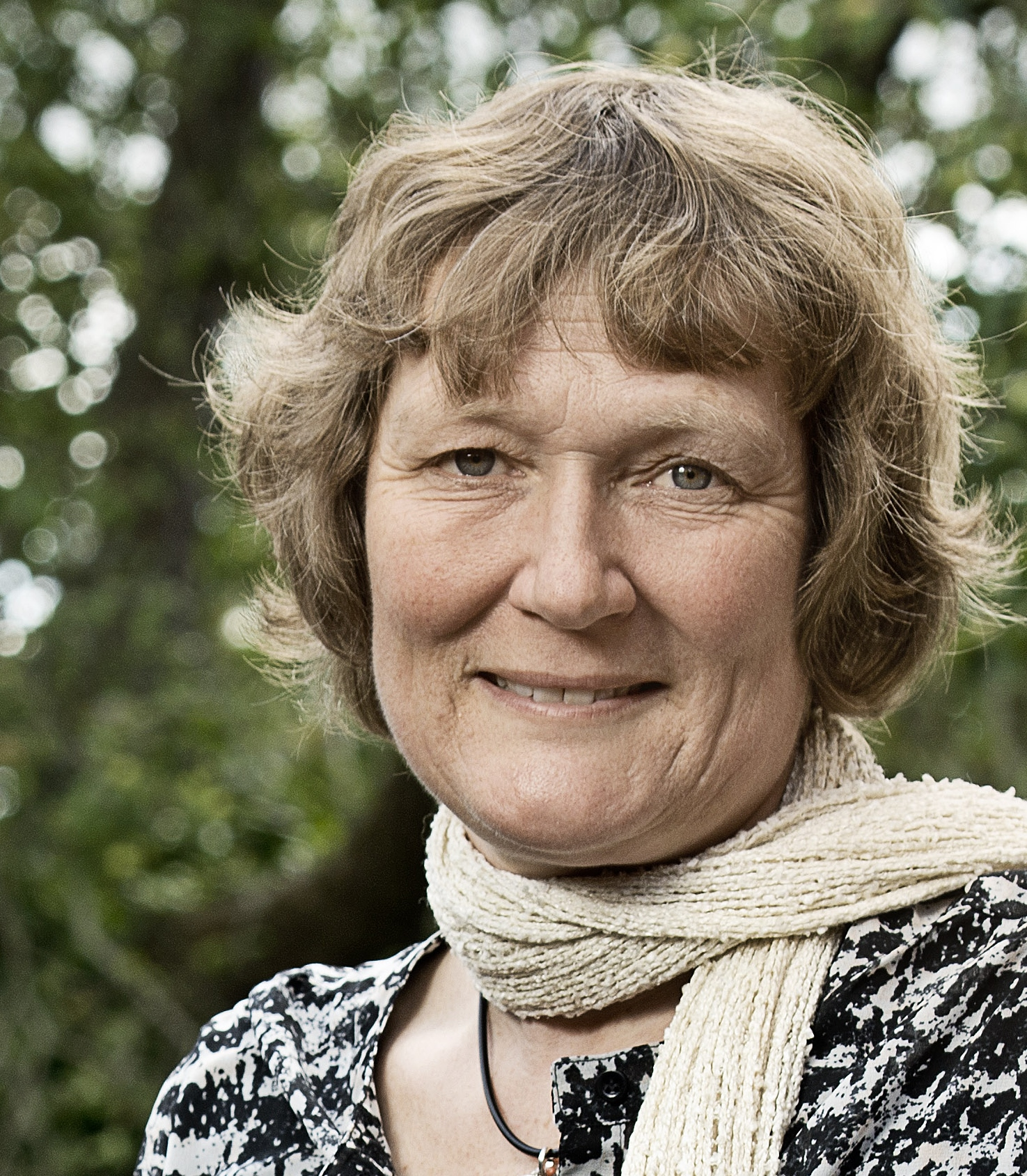
- Born: 20.07.1964; Copenhagen
- Occupation: professor
- Awards: ERC Advanced Grant

Kirsten Gram-Hanssen (born 20.07.1964) is a Danish professor at Department of the Build Environment of Aalborg University in Copenhagen. She graduated Master from Department of Social Science at the Technical University of Denmark (DTU) in 1991 and in 1996 she was awarded a Ph.D.

== Career ==
Her research is centered on housing, everyday life and consumption from a climate and energy perspective. Her research examines differences in household consumption practices and explains these differences within a perspective of theories of practice that emphasizes the importance of routines and technical infrastructures. Her research documents that the social organization of everyday lives means at least as much to the energy consumption of homes as the technical energy efficiency of buildings and appliances. She also researches how new technologies such as private photovoltaic systems and smart control of light and heat affect everyday life and energy consumption.

She has been Guest researcher at foreign universities, among others at Oxford University in 2017. She has also been invited keynote at several international conferences. She has contributed as evaluator for UK, Swedish and Norwegian Research Councils and as EU-expert in evaluating PF7 and ERC projects. Furthermore she is ”Member of European Research Council (ERC) identification committee”.

Gram-Hanssen has been project leader on major projects. Among others she has received a ERC Advanced Grant on 2,11 mill € for the project “eCAPE: New energy consumer roles and smart technologies – actors, practices and equality”.

== Publications ==
Kirsten Gram-Hanssen has published over 200 publications and she is cited many times.

Selected publications:

- Gram-Hanssen, K., Christensen, T. H., do Carmo, C., & Madsen, L. V. (2020). Sequence of practices in personal and societal rhythms – Showering as a case. Time and Society, 29(1), 256-281.
- Gram-Hanssen, K, Georg, S, Christiansen, E & Heiselberg, P 2018, 'What next for energy-related building regulations? the occupancy phase', Building Re-search and Information, bind 46, nr. 7, s. 790-803.
- Gram-Hanssen, K & Darby, SSJ (2018), “Home is where the smart is”? Evaluating smart home research and approaches against the concept of home. Energy Re-search and Social Science, 37, s. 94-101
