= Villa Freischütz =

- Villa Freischütz—Das Hausmuseum
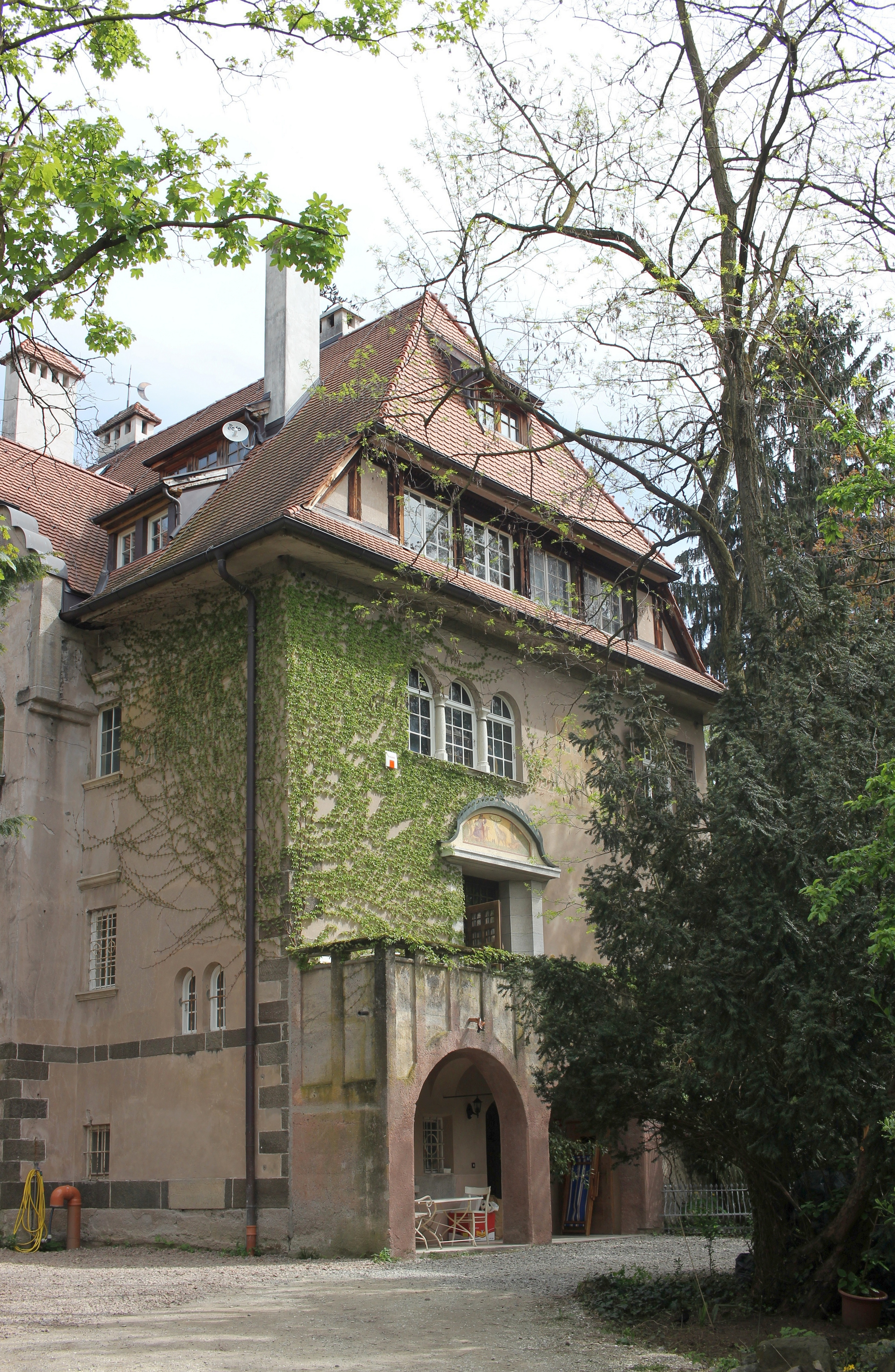
- Exterior of the Villa Freischütz
- Location: Meran, South Tyrol
- Coordinates: 46.6721°N 11.1769°E
- Type: Art museum
- Accreditation: Museumsverband Südtirol
- Collection size: 10,000+
- Director: Herta Waldner
- Owner: Villa Freischütz Foundation
- Website: www.villafreischuetz.org/en/
- Building details

Design and construction
- Architects: Christian Städler (architect), Josef Mattmann (master builder)

The Villa Freischütz is a three-storey building in Meran (South Tyrol, Italy), constructed in 1909–10. Originally a private residence, since 2019, it is a private museum and a non-profit cultural institution.

It was built as a private residence by the Meran-based building firm Josef Mattmann, based on plans by the architect Christian Städler and presents a mansard hipped roof, an external staircase leading to the entrance on the first floor, two bay-window-like projections on the south side and corner quoins. The client was Ignaz Gritsch, a master butcher from Meran. In 1921, he sold the house to Franz Fromm, a wine merchant originally from the Kingdom of Hanover who was based in Meran. Following the purchase of the building, Villa Freischütz became the permanent residence in 1922 of the very wealthy Fromm family, who filled the building with works of art and cultural artefacts over the decades.

Luisa(bel), the eldest daughter of Franz Fromm, married the future Italian general Enea Navarini (1885–1977) in 1925. The villa remained in the family's possession until the death of their daughter, Rosamaria Navarini (1926–2013). In her will, she established the Freischütz Foundation to open the house and the family's collection to the public as a museum.

On the first floor, the Piano nobile, Franz Fromm's study and two of the villa's drawing rooms are on display. On the second floor is Rosamaria Navarini's flat, which has remained virtually unchanged. The permanent exhibition was curated by Ariane Karbe. The exhibition itinerary is complemented by temporary exhibitions on themes drawn from the house's rich collection.

Franz Fromm collected more than 1,000 objects, including 16th- and 17th-century cabinets, many of which are on display in the villa. Fromm owned an extensive collection of decorative arts and also acquired works of contemporary art. The collection includes, amongst other things, works by Ellen Tornquist, Eduard Euler and Georg Greve-Lindau, who was married to Fromm's daughter, Zoila. Among the oldest pieces is a seated Madonna in the Catalan-Romanesque style dating from the early 13th century.

The objects form part of both the museum and the family's history. ″Villa Freischütz is not a typical museum. Here, the world is not explained through the order imposed by classification, but through the observation of a microcosm accompanied by associations, just as in a classic Wunderkammer.″

In 2021, the house exhibited an Ethiopian cloak, likely looted by Enea Navarini – Franz Fromm's son-in-law – during the colonial period, becoming the first museum in South Tyrol to address postcolonial issues and the topic of the restitution of looted works of art. It tackled the racist and colonial involvement of the former owner Navarini, an Italian general in the Abyssinian War who likely introduced the cloak into the villa's collections.

A podcast produced by the two curators of the exhibition won first prize in the podcast category of the German DigAMus Award in 2021.

The museum was shortlisted for the final round of the 2024 European Museum of the Year Award.
