= Lease-by-room =

Multi-room apartments with shared bathrooms and living rooms

Lease-by-room, also known as individual leasing, is an arrangement whereby a tenant and their roommates pay rent for their own rooms instead of each tenant being equally liable for the rent for the whole apartment. Typically lease-by-room leases are multi-room apartments or townhomes with shared bathrooms and living rooms. What distinguishes lease-by-room leases from joint leases is that tenants take on a lower financial risk, as they will not have to cover if their roommates do not pay rent and they cannot be evicted if their roommates fall behind on payments.

== Tenant ==
A benefit for renters is that in lease-by-room agreements, a tenant is not liable for damage to roommates' rooms; they are only liable for public spaces and their own room.

Potential downsides could include not being able to choose your replacement roommate if someone gets evicted and the lease may cost more per month than typical leases.

A study from the University of Florida found that lease-by-room housing is generally unattractive to students, and in particular, graduate students. Students generally preferred on-campus housing. A mixed-retail complex with affordable apartment housing was suggested as a more attractive alternative to off-campus housing.

== Landlord ==
The benefits and downsides for landlords are largely the reverse of the tenants. Lease-by-room arrangements mean landlords have to sign one lease per roommate and may have to file separate evictions if multiple roommates do not pay rent. Since tenants need housing and are not always willing to risk the possibility of eviction, homelessness, or significant financial loss if roommates fail to pay a joint lease, landlords are able to charge higher rent for lease-by-room agreements. Even if there is no difference in an apartment that is individually or jointly leased, an individual lease will typically be more expensive due to the risk to the landlord and the need for housing.

== See also ==
- Rooming house
- Leasehold estate
- Single-room occupancy
- Tenants union
