= Farmland (disambiguation) =

Farmland generally refers to agricultural land, or land (typically Arable land) currently used for the purposes of farming. It may also refer to:

- Farmland Assessment Act of 1964, provides for reduced taxes on farmland in New Jersey
- Farmland development rights in Suffolk County, New York, a program to purchase development rights for farmland
- Farmland (film), a documentary film about agriculture in the United States
- Farmland, Indiana, a town in the United States
- Farmland Industries, founded in 1929 as the Union Oil Company, later renamed Consumers Cooperative Association (CCA) and Farmland Industries, Inc.
- Farmland preservation, an effort to set aside and protect examples of a region's farmland for the use, education, and enjoyment of future generations
- Farmland protection, programs in the United States designed to limit conversion of agricultural land to other uses
