= Housing unit =

Space used as a home

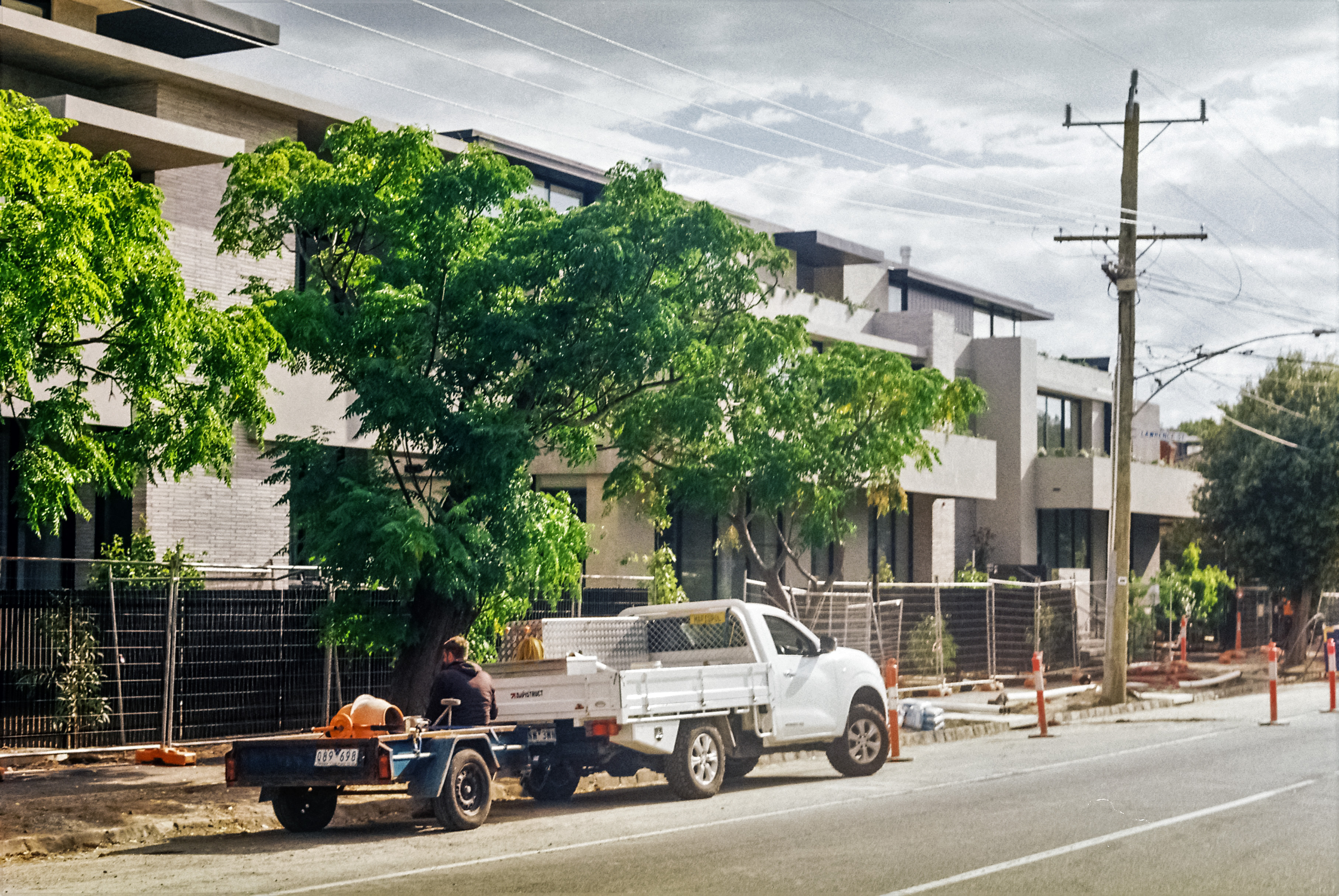
Set of units under construction in Victoria, Australia

A housing unit, or dwelling unit (at later mention, often abbreviated to unit), is a structure or the part of a structure or the space that is used as a home, residence, or sleeping place by one person or more people who maintain a common household.

In common speech in Australia and New Zealand, the word "unit", when referring to housing, usually means an apartment, where a group of apartments is contained in one or more multi-storey buildings (an 'apartment block'), or a villa unit or home unit, where a group of dwellings is in one or more single-storey buildings, usually arranged around a driveway. Then, a unit is a self-contained suite of rooms, usually of modest scale, which may be attached, semi-detached or detached, within a group of similar dwellings. Used in the Australian and New Zealand urban planning and development industry, it is also a synonym for dwelling.

A single room unit is more commonly referred to as a studio flat, if the unit has a private bathroom and kitchen, or bedsitter, otherwise known as a single-room occupancy or SRO in North America, if not.

In the United States, the US Census Bureau defines a housing unit as any single-family residential structure (like a house or a manufactured home) or any distinct unit in a multi-unit building where the unit provides privacy for the occupants, and the unit has access to the outside, and occupancy is independent of any institutional affiliation. If there is an institutional affiliation or a restriction on who can live in a building, the building may instead be a group quarters facility.

In Canada, Statistics Canada counts the number of private dwellings in the country at each census, in which case they are then known as "dwelling units" and can refer equally to a house or an apartment. In everyday Canadian English "unit" is used an umbrella term for apartments and condominiums.

== See also ==
- House
- Medium-density housing
- Urban consolidation
- List of house types
