= Save Our State (Australia) =

Former political group in New South Wales

Save Our State (SOS), formerly known as Save Our Suburbs, was a community group concerned about the impact of contemporary development on established low-density residential suburbs in Australian cities.

It was established in Melbourne, Victoria in the mid-1990s and now has bases in New South Wales, South Australia, the Australian Capital Territory and Queensland. In Victoria, SOS has had significant influence on residential planning policy, most notably on the importance of neighbourhood character within the state's planning scheme and its delineation in the residential design code, 'ResCode', implemented in 2001. SOS's influence can also be seen in some of the key components of the Metropolitan Strategy, Melbourne 2030 regarding the focus on intensification of 'activity centres' in line with Transit-oriented development (TOD) principles and on aiming to protect existing residential areas.

The Save Our Suburbs group was involved in opposing inner city arterial road construction in Sydney including the Southern Arterial Route. An interview of a former member named Joyce (of Buckland Streets) stated "the core of SOS came from Wyndham Street and after the 1987 decisions they sold up and moved out."

SOS formation and rapid growth was a reaction to the planning policies of the Kennett government in Victoria during the 1990s, in particular the planning code known as 'The Good Design Guide for Medium Density Housing'. A measure of the significance of the issues that SOS campaigns about and the profile thus gained is indicated by SOS securing registered political party status in New South Wales and fielding candidates in the 2007 New South Wales state election. The party changed its name to "Save Our State" in 2010.

== See also ==
- Suburb
- Suburban sprawl
- Automobile dependency
- Transit-oriented development
- Smart growth
- NIMBY
