= GVC =

GVC may refer to:

== Companies and organizations ==
- Genesee Valley Conservancy, an American land trust
- Girls Venture Corps Air Cadets, in the United Kingdom
- GVC Holdings, a Manx gambling company rebranded as Entain
- Main Computation Centre of the General Staff, a Russian military unit

== Places ==
- Government Victoria College, Palakkad, Kerala, India
- Great Valley Center, in California, United States
- Den Haag Centraal railway station, in The Hague, Netherlands

== Other ==
- Galician–Volhynian Chronicle, a 13th-century chronicle about the Kingdom of Galicia–Volhynia in Eastern Europe
- Gastrovascular cavity, an organ in certain animals
- Global value chain, in economics
- Wanano language, spoken in Brazil and Colombia
- Global Village Coffeehouse, a design aesthetic
