= Farmland development rights in Suffolk County, New York =

Farmland development rights in Suffolk County, New York began in 1975 in Suffolk County as the state of New York began a program to purchase development rights for farmland to insure they remained as farms and open space rather than being developed for housing.

== Location ==
Suffolk County, New York, comprises the eastern portion of Long Island and borders Nassau County on the west. The remainder of Long Island is occupied by Queens County and Kings County, which are part of New York City. Suffolk County is more than 80 miles (130 km) long and 20 miles (30 km) wide and encompasses 922 square miles (2,388 km^{2}). With its close proximity to New York City and amenities prized by land developers, Suffolk County was ripe for intensive development.

== Overview ==
The program involves purchasing from landowners what the county has defined as "development rights." Development rights are all of the property owner's rights, title, and interest in the property except raw ownership, the right of possession and the right to use the property for agriculture. The program involves the solicitation by the county of bids on a voluntary basis by property owners interested in selling the development rights of their property to the county. If a bidder's offer is accepted, the county pays to the bidder the sum of money equal to the appraised market value of the development rights by certified check, assuming that, following a title examination at county expense, it is determined that the bidder can convey good and marketable title, free of any encumbrances, to the county for his development rights.

The program does not require any bidder to offer the development rights to all of his property. He may offer such rights for all or part of his ownership. The concept provides an extraordinary opportunity for imaginative and innovative preservation techniques at minimum risk. For example, it is possible that a farmer who owns and operates his farm could readily sell his development rights to the county, retaining the agricultural title to his own land, while using the proceeds of the sale of his development rights to acquire the agricultural title to adjoining land or land within reasonable proximity suitable for expansion of his farming activity.

=== Benefits ===
The concept is attractive to farmers anxious to remain in the agricultural industry in Suffolk County, but hard-pressed by periodic cash shortages and ever increasing real property taxes, as well as the threat of extensive complications and problems of liquidation upon the death of the farmer.

Through the sale of the development rights, he liquidates the greater proportion of his total equity in the value of his real property and converts it to cash which, in turn, can provide him with operating capital, investment capital or income-producing investments. The conversion of the development rights from real property into cash also places the family in a position of avoiding forced liquidation at a sacrifice price at the time of the death of the farmer. The real property tax picture also brightens for such a participating farmer because assessments of real property must be made in full recognition of actual value. The sale of development rights thus precluding the use of the property for anything other than agriculture in perpetuity reduces the market value of the property by virtue of that limitation.

While the purchase of development rights provides a great benefit to the farmer, it also provides benefits to the people of Suffolk County now, and in the future, through the preservation of a vital industry and extensive open space. Furthermore, the development rights concept provides for the retention of ownership and possession and maintenance of the property with the landowner who, through the pride of ownership and possession can be far more effective in maintaining the physical condition of the property than the county.

== History ==
The history of the real estate development of Long Island followed the classical mode from inner city to the suburban areas of Nassau and Suffolk Counties. The greatest development occurred shortly after World War II. In 1970, the census count for Suffolk County was over the one million mark. It appeared that there would be no end to this wave of development and that Suffolk County was destined for the same fate that befell Nassau County. Nassau County, at the end of World War II, contained many viable working farms growing food crops and producing dairy products for New York City. By 1970, the farms of Nassau County were gone, covered over by urban sprawl.

Early in 1972, John V.N. Klein, the newly elected County Executive, envisioned the idea of buying farmland development rights. Suffolk County is the leading agricultural county in New York State in dollar amounts of agricultural products grown. He believed that the agricultural industry was a vital economic, environmental and social resource worth saving. The eastern end of Suffolk County supports a thriving tourist industry because of its many miles of sandy beaches, but also because of its open spaces and rural atmosphere.

After years of meetings, conferences, discussions and the issuance of various committee reports from farmers, environmental groups, citizen groups, and the Suffolk County Legislature, a local law sponsored by Klein was finally enacted in 1973 which created the farm preservation program.

=== Implementation ===
Early in 1975, the County Legislature approved the hiring of appraisers and subsequently values were submitted to the Legislature based upon a July 1975 valuation date. At that time, the municipal government of New York City was in the throes of financial collapse which consequently affected the municipal bond market and forced the interest borrowing rates to escalate to an exorbitantly high level. This caused the Legislature to decline the approval of the acquisition of development rights because of the exorbitant expense of securing bond monies.

In September 1976, the Legislature completely reversed its position and approved the acquisition of the development rights of 60 farms based upon the original valuation of 21 million dollars. The resolutions that were passed by the Legislature included the bid values tendered by the farmers along with the appraised values that had been submitted the prior year. In October 1976, the total project was turned over to William R. Lockwood of the Department of Land Management for review and approval of the appraisals to justify the expenditure of 21 million dollars for the development rights acquisition. It was at that time that he first became involved with this project.

== Appraisal review process ==
In pre-reviewing the land appraisals, it was recognized that it was necessary to update and re-appraise due to a decided decline in land market values in the eastern end of Suffolk County. In January 1977, the County of Suffolk hired new valuation consultants to assist in determining the value of the development rights for the 60 farms. The original appraisal concepts which were developed by the consultants were sound and were used to re-appraise the total project.

A real estate appraiser was hired who analyzed the real estate market in the three townships being appraised. Data was secured on all of the comparable sales that occurred in the recent past along with present-day listings of similar comparable property together with the analysis of recently foreclosed land. This information was verified and analyzed in detail by the appraiser and submitted. The information contained therein was subsequently used by the appraiser in documenting and supporting his appraised values of the property before the development rights were acquired.

It was decided to make appraisals using a before and after technique. The after value would reflect the value of the property after the development rights had been acquired. This was the basic bundle of rights theory: only the right to development was being bought; hence, the after value was theoretically a pure farm. A farm expert, who specialized in appraising farms in New York State and the immediate adjacent states, was hired. It was determined that there were no pure farms on Long Island. The farm expert concluded that the farming of the land in Suffolk County was a holding operation as all of the farmlands had the potential for development for other than farmlands and this potential was reflected in the prices paid for farm land on Long Island. This was no recent occurrence as it had always been thus on Long Island. The farmers were forced out by development from Kings County to Queens County, to Nassau County, and finally to Suffolk County.

=== Pure farm values ===
The farm expert advised that he would have to go to other comparable farm areas to determine pure farm values. He secured farm sales in areas where development wasn't probable within the foreseeable future. He investigated comparable sales in the entire State of New York, including the Orange County and Mohawk River Valley muck lands, the States of New Jersey, Connecticut and Massachusetts. He secured and categorized comparable sales from all these areas and submitted them to us in a brochure which was voluminous. He discarded many of the areas as not being comparable and finally selected sales in northern Massachusetts, in the Connecticut River Valley, the Orange County muck lands and the extensive South Jersey farmlands. All of the properties selected as being comparable had similar soil characteristics, irrigation problems, modes of transportation and growing seasons. If there were any differences, these items were noted and adjusted when the appraiser submitted his appraisal of the farms after development rights were acquired.

The review appraiser's additional function in this project was one of coordination and guidance. Monthly meetings were held to assure the project's progress. The information accumulated was voluminous and mind-boggling that it was decided instead to use visual displays to assist us in presenting the program to the farmers. As a result, a consultant display expert was hired to develop town wide aerial photograph maps which displayed all of the market data in a simple fashion that could easily be seen and understood. Not only were the comparable sales, subject properties, listings, foreclosures and subdivisions included on the maps color-coded, but also other important data such as zoning, water districts, school districts, major street names, etc. This consultant also prepared individual survey-type sketches of the properties to be acquired. These were drawn on reproducible aerial photographs. They were used by all of the consultants. Copies were given to the property owner and eventually used in preparation of contracts for purchase subject to confirmation by a survey supplied by the County of Suffolk.

=== Market conditions ===
The initial accumulation of market data which was gathered by our valuation consultants indicated that the pure farm values in the metropolitan area held steady; however, real estate that was suitable for housing developments or at least had the potential for development decidedly had declined. In September 1973, there was an economic downturn. Comparable sales data indicated in 1974 that the real estate market still was active and the prices were still high. However, this data did not reflect current trends and in 1975 there were few sales. during this time the original appraisals were made on the farm property. Further market analysis indicated that the prices were decidedly low in 1976 and again lower in 1977.

Trying to establish the value of these properties proved difficult in the downward market. Complicating the situation were the offers made to all the owners based upon the original appraised values. These values had to be solidly supported to make the presentations convincing and acceptable to the farmers and speculators. Because it was evident that there was a distinct change in values, an additional real estate consultant and land planner was hired to further investigate the factors that led to the market decline. This resulted in an "Economic and Land Development Study" that included a complete analysis of all of the subdivisions filed in the townships within the past 10 years along with detailed studies of airport development, road development, the bridge construction to Connecticut, population studies and any other factor that would assist us in determining when this land ultimately might be developed.

=== Verification of the data ===
Upon receiving this data, appraisers decided they would not only rely upon the consultants, but instead verify this information in the field themselves. The market data was presented and discussed with many real estate brokers in town, the assessors, farm credit service representatives, cooperative extension agents, builders, land planners, vineyard owners and bank representatives. This exchange of information not only verified and gave details and facts about each transaction, but allowed missed facts to be uncovered. This survey was ultimately used in our presentation to the farmer.

An unexpected result was that the real estate experts were convinced that the appraisers were determined to arrive at just compensation and the fair market value of development rights. The real estate appraiser used all of the information received from the experts and ultimately reduced this information into one appraisal report. The report included a before value, the real estate appraised value, an after value that was the pure farm appraisal (appraised as if the development rights were secured by the county) and then ultimately the difference between the two resulted in the value of the development rights. During the presentation, data showed that the potato blossoms in June on farms in Northern Massachusetts and in the Connecticut River Valley were the same size as those in Suffolk and further that they were picking strawberries at the same time. This information was gathered through physical inspection of the comparable farm properties in New York and adjacent states.

=== Valuation presentation to the farmers ===
Rather than give the farmer a copy of the appraisal, it was decided to provide all of the market data in a condensed form and a brochure was made up which included market data sales, foreclosures, listings and the broker's survey. This information was a synopsis of what was said in the presentation. This booklet, with an aerial photograph of the subject property, a letter indicating the before and after values plus the development rights value, was given to the farmer to use in decision making.

Phase I of the Farmlands Program was to acquire the development rights of 60 farms. The Legislature allocated 21 million dollars for this phase of the program. The approved appraised value for the development rights to the 60 farms came to $10,175,000, which was a substantial reduction in value from the original offers made to the owners. Farmer Nathaniel Talmadge, the first to sign up for the program, was originally offered $4,525 an acre for his development rights; he settled for $2,725 per acre. His statement to the press fairly well sums up the feelings of most farmers, "I am pretty well convinced that they (the new appraisals) were fair. I would not say I was pleased." Fifty-two of the approved participants have agreed to sell the development rights to their farms to the county.

== See also ==
- Agricultural Land Reserve, British Columbia
- Agriculture Retention and Development Act, New Jersey
- Farmland Assessment Act of 1964, New Jersey
- Real estate development
- Real estate investing
