= Conservation development =

Controlled-growth land use development

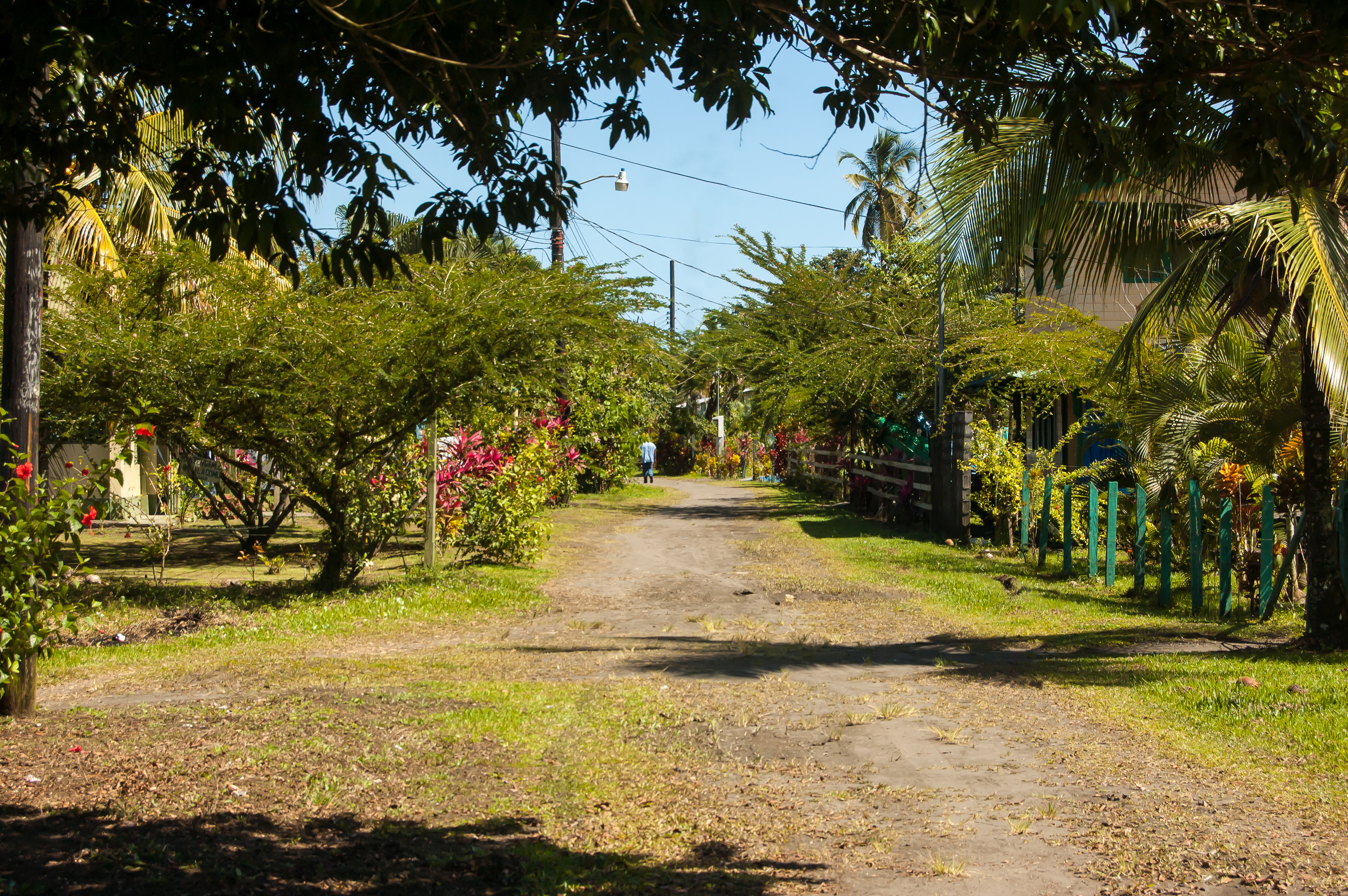
Parismina, main street, Costa Rica

Conservation development, also known as conservation design, is a controlled-growth land use development that adopts the principle for allowing limited sustainable development while protecting the area's natural environmental features in perpetuity, including preserving open space landscape and vista, protecting farmland or natural habitats for wildlife, and maintaining the character of rural communities. A conservation development is usually defined as a project that dedicates a minimum of 50 percent of the total development parcel as open space. The management and ownership of the land are often formed by the partnership between private land owners, land-use conservation organizations and local government. It is a growing trend in many parts of the country, particularly in the Western United States. In the Eastern United States, conservation design has been promoted by some state and local governments as a technique to help preserve water quality.

This type of planning has become more relevant as "land conversion for housing development is a leading cause of habitat loss and fragmentation". With a loss or fragmentation of a species' habitat, it results in the endangerment of a species and pushes them towards premature extinction. Land conversion also contributes to the reduction of agriculturally productive land, already shrinking due to climate change.

Conservation development differs from other land protection approaches by aiming to protect land and environmental resources on parcels slated for immediate development—to protect land here and now. In contrast, a green belt approach typically aims to protect land from future development, and in a region beyond areas currently slated for development. It seeks to offer a gradient between urban regions and open countryside, beyond what a line on a map—typically a highway—currently provides. This approach seeks to avoid the dichotomy of economic urbanism on one side of such a street while on the other lies completely protected woodlands and farm fields, devoid of inclusion in that economy. Addressing the theoretical illusion that humanity walled off is better-off, conservation development recognizes that design of how we live is far more important than we allot credit; that instead of walling off a problem we need to face that problem and drastically lower our impact on the sites where we live, and indeed raise the performance of our communities toward a level where such walls are no longer considered first response requirements.

== History ==
Conservation development was formulated in the early 1980s by a British-trained planner Randall Arendt. He pulled together several concepts from the 1960s. He combined the idea of cluster and open space design with Ian McHarg's "design with nature" philosophy.

== Conservation development ==
Conservation development seeks to protect a variety of ecological resources and services such as biodiversity, productive farmland, ecosystem services, scenic landscapes and historic and cultural resources. This is achieved by identifying the ecologically sensitive and valuable areas. The protected lands can be under an easement to prevent development on it. Housing is then built around the protected areas. Density, lots sizes, types of housing and amount of protected area is dependent on the type of conservation development.

While not a prevalent type of development, it is estimated that conservation development takes up between 2.5%-10% of the total US real estate development. Conservation development is usually applied to rural, exurban or suburban residential subdivisions, though it does have a few urban applications (Doyle 4).

While there are several types of conservation developments, they all have several features in common. All developments have conservation land set aside, either held by a conservation organization or protected by a conservation easement. These developments must have ongoing stewardship for the protected portion of the parcel. Secondly, the development finances the protected area. Third, each development begins by surveying the land's ecological features and resources. A decision can then be made about where to build and what areas need to be protected. Lastly, these developments also use a variety of design features to reduce some of the negative impacts inherent in development. Examples include low-impact stormwater management systems, and landscape design.

== Types ==
Milder cites four principal conservation development techniques found in the United States. The first two he groups together as having a "conservation with development" philosophy. Conservation is the main goal with development as a means to that end. The latter two types fall under the "development with conservation" ethos. These two types of projects are done through private developers whose goal is to turn a profit at the end of the day, but in a "conservation-friendly matter". Table 1 provides an excellent summary of the different conservation development techniques.

=== Conservation buyer projects ===
In this situation, a land trust buys the property and places the ecologically important areas under a conservation easement. The land is then resold, including the easement, to a conservation buyer. The buyer cannot build on the easement but may do so on the remaining, unprotected portion. This technique usually results in a few houses being built on the piece of land, resulting in a low density development. According to a study undertaken by Milder & Clark, 98.4% of the total land receives protection, the highest amongst the four conservation development types.

=== Conservation and limited development projects ===
Conservation and limited development projects (CLDP) are a type of development often carried out by land trusts, and occasionally by conservation-minded developers or landowners. Real estate is developed for sale on an open market, and the profit is used to finance conservation of the nearby land. Milder & Clark found that 93.5% of the total land area is protected under this type of development. Recent studies done on the effectiveness of CLDPs in protecting, restoring and managing threatened resources reveal that it is significantly more effective at doing so, in comparison to conservation subdivisions and conventional development.

=== Conservation subdivisions ===
Conservation subdivisions are a type of development that "sets aside a major portion of the site as conservation land" and clusters housing on the remaining portion. The houses are built on lots smaller than usual, meaning the density of the development nears the maximum allowed by zoning. Unlike conservation and limited development projects, a homeowners' association manages the protected land. These associations may lack knowledge and have different goals regarding the lands' management, which may result in a less than ideally managed conservation. As a result of this and other factors, a study found that on average only 57.1% of the total land area is protected from development.

=== Conservation-oriented planned development projects ===
Conservation-oriented planned development projects are large-scale development projects found in suburban and exurban areas. The scale of the projects means large tracts of land can be protected. They typically have densities nearing the zoned maximum and feature of a mix of housing types and land uses. The resulting percentage of protected land is 71.3.

== Conservation community ==
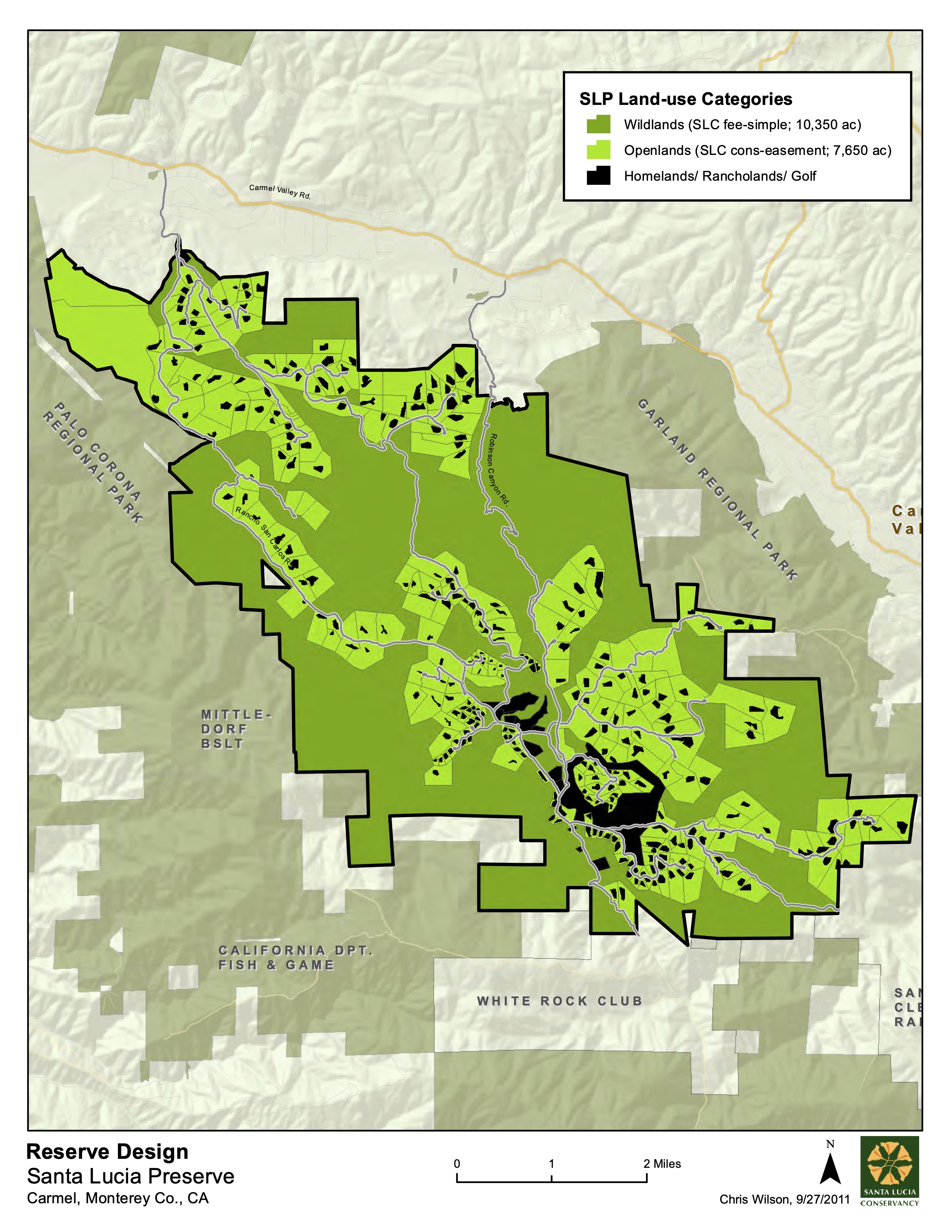
This map of Santa Lucia Preserve, a conservation community in California, depicts which portions are protected by conservation covenants.

A conservation community (or conservation development) is a real estate and conservation hybrid model of land development, consisting of both protected areas and human settlements, with the primary goal of saving large parcels of land from ecological degradation. This land can be forested land, agricultural land, ranch land, or any other type of land that needs protecting from high-impact development. This model is contrasted from other protected area models by integrating human communities within nature, rather than relocating them outside, and as such falls under the IUCN's Category V protected area designation.

The model represents an integral balance between people and nature and can sustain for-profit activity such as residential communities, private clubs, or small-scale industrial activity on conditions that ensure the continued protection or ecological restoration of an area.

Conservation communities are models of sustainable community development, providing an alternative to conventional forms of development. They are adaptable to the needs of different regions and use small-scale residential development to fund conservation, eliminating the need to solely depend on funding from private donors or governments, though they are sometimes additionally subsidized by such investments. This land development model is important to goals of sustainable development, green infrastructure, local food security, and responsible management of natural resources.

Some of the tools used to create conservation communities are conservation covenants, ecoforestry covenants, and other forms of covenant registered to the title of the land. Covenants are a legal contract used to protect the integrity of the ecosystem, the ecological health of watersheds (which are damaged by increased development), maintain long-term access to natural resources and associated value-added opportunities, protect native plant and animal species, and mitigate climate change impacts.

In an effort to avoid greenwashing and in order to increase accountability and public transparency, some conservation communities establish separate federally registered charities or 501(c)(3) non-profit land trusts, which own the land in fee and extend conservation easements to developers and private homeowners. This way, the incentive structure ensures real estate developers stay true to the mission of conservation, with the land trust vested with authority to investigate, report, and penalize infractions.

Conservation communities are developed not only to minimize their ecological footprint but to improve the existing ecological system's performance. The planning stage for the residential community focuses around maintaining and enhancing the ecological integrity of the land. Therefore, the community sits on the least sensitive part of the land from an ecological point of view and is often built using low-impact infrastructure such as Nature-based Solutions for the civil engineering and LEED-targeted housing. To further reduce broader environmental impact, many conservation communities (whether in whole or in part) generate their own power, pump their own water, and grow food on-site.

=== The economy ===
In addition to residential use, conservation communities can supplement their funding through other eco-compatible uses such as sustainable resource extraction, value-added manufacturing opportunities, organic horticulture, live/work enterprises, ecotourism, recreational and ecological educational opportunities. Through these additional measures, long-term protection of the land is sustained by the economic value created through restrained, eco-conscious business.

Additionally, conservation communities can create sustainable employment opportunities for those living in the communities as well as the surrounding region. Ecotourism promotes environmental protection and support for the well-being of local community members by bringing visitors into the conservation community for educational and recreational purposes.

=== Community ===
As a novel and intentional approach to human settlement, conservation communities can be designed to strengthen interconnectedness between community members as well as with the broader local community. Doug Makaroff, founder of Elkington Forest (recently renamed to Malahat Forest Estates) noted that "by building sustainable and relational communities, our lives are richer".

=== Examples ===
Community name	Location	Active?
Deer Path Farm	Illinois, US	Yes
Elkington Forest	British Columbia, Canada	Yes
Independence Denver	Colorado, US	Yes
Palmetto Bluff	South Carolina, US	Yes
Pendergrast Farm Community	Georgia, US	Yes
Prairie Crossing	Illinois, US	Yes
Santa Lucia Preserve	California, US	Yes
Serenbe	Georgia, US	Yes
The Boulders	North Carolina, US	Yes
Tryon Farm	Indiana, US	Yes
Young Ranch	California, US	Proposed

== Advantages ==
The biggest advantage of conservation development is that it can protect species and ecosystems, preventing further habitat fragmentation and loss. By surveying the land and identifying the primary conservation areas where ecosystems are most at risk, communities are created without huge disruption to the environment. Conservation development also provides for secondary conservation areas, which provide corridors for animals to hunt, mate and travel through.

However, any development will have some impact on the land. But by studying it, there are ways in which this can be mitigated. A developer can have native vegetation planted. Wildlife friendly native species could be introduced, while invasive species are monitored and controlled. Stormwater management systems are also used to "promote natural flow patterns and infiltration", considered a very important factor in minimizing a development's impact.

There are several benefits from an economic standpoint. Conservation development allows developers to make themselves distinct in a competitive housing market. A developer can use an environmentally oriented marketing strategy, highlighting the benefits of the development to possible buyer with a green thumb. A final advantage of conservation development is that homes in these developments tend appreciate faster than their conventional counterparts.

Pejchar et al. and Arendt cite a number of economic benefits that accrue to municipalities through conservation development. They include fewer public costs on maintenance and infrastructure, protecting open space without losing tax revenues, and avoiding the loss of ecological services like landscape stabilization, flood control and clean water. A municipality also experiences a reduced demand for public green space since it has been provided free of charge by the development.

Lastly, there are a few social and recreational advantages to conservation development. With the smaller lots that accompany these houses, homeowners are likely to move into public green space and engage with their neighbors. Community events such as picnics or parties are more common. The protected green space also provides excellent recreational activities, such as hiking, jogging, or simply observing nature. It is hopeful that with this experience, people can reconnect with nature and develop a land ethic.

== Disadvantages ==
There are several drawbacks to conservation development. The first problem encountered is the perceived risk by both developers and homebuyers. In protecting sensitive areas, developers and homeowners see a risk in the possible elimination of desired sites to build homes. This might be a large enough risk to discourage developers. This could be a place for government intervention, which could provide tax breaks to developers building a development this way.

Conservation subdivisions and conservation-oriented planned development projects have been "criticized for protecting land at too small a scale to provide meaningful conservation benefits, while simultaneously promoting "leapfrog" development". This pushes sprawl further from the city and contributes to a more fragmented rural area.

== Implications ==
This type of planning has become more relevant as "land conversion for housing development is a leading cause of habitat loss and fragmentation". With a loss or fragmentation of a species' habitat, it results in the endangerment of a species and pushes them towards premature extinction. Without biodiversity, we lose the many benefits we derive from it, including economic and ecological services, genetic information, and recreational pleasure, just to name a few. Land conversion also contributes to the reduction of agriculturally productive land, already shrinking due to climate change.

== See also ==
- Community-based conservation – Conservation movement emerging in the 1980s
- Conservation community – Controlled-growth land use development
- Environmental planning – Considering environment in developing land
- Land trust – Conservation organization
- Low impact development – Developments with little or no environmental impact
- Preservation development – Model of real-estate development (farmland preservation)
- Private protected area
- Protected area – Areas protected for having ecological or cultural importance
- Residential cluster development
- Smart growth – Urban planning philosophy

== Sources ==
- McMahon, Edward (2010). Conservation communities : creating value with nature, open space, and agriculture. Washington, DC: Urban Land Institute. ISBN 9780874202175.
- Anderson, Jennifer (Summer 2014). "Protecting Land Through Conservation Development: Lessons from Land Trust Experience". Saving Land Magazine. Land Trust Alliance.
- Heid, FASLA, Jim (June 2014). "Conservation Development" (PDF). JHeid.com/ideas. "A definitional framework of Conservation Development and four case studies."
