= Peachcroft =

Historic house in New York, United States

- U.S. National Register of Historic Places
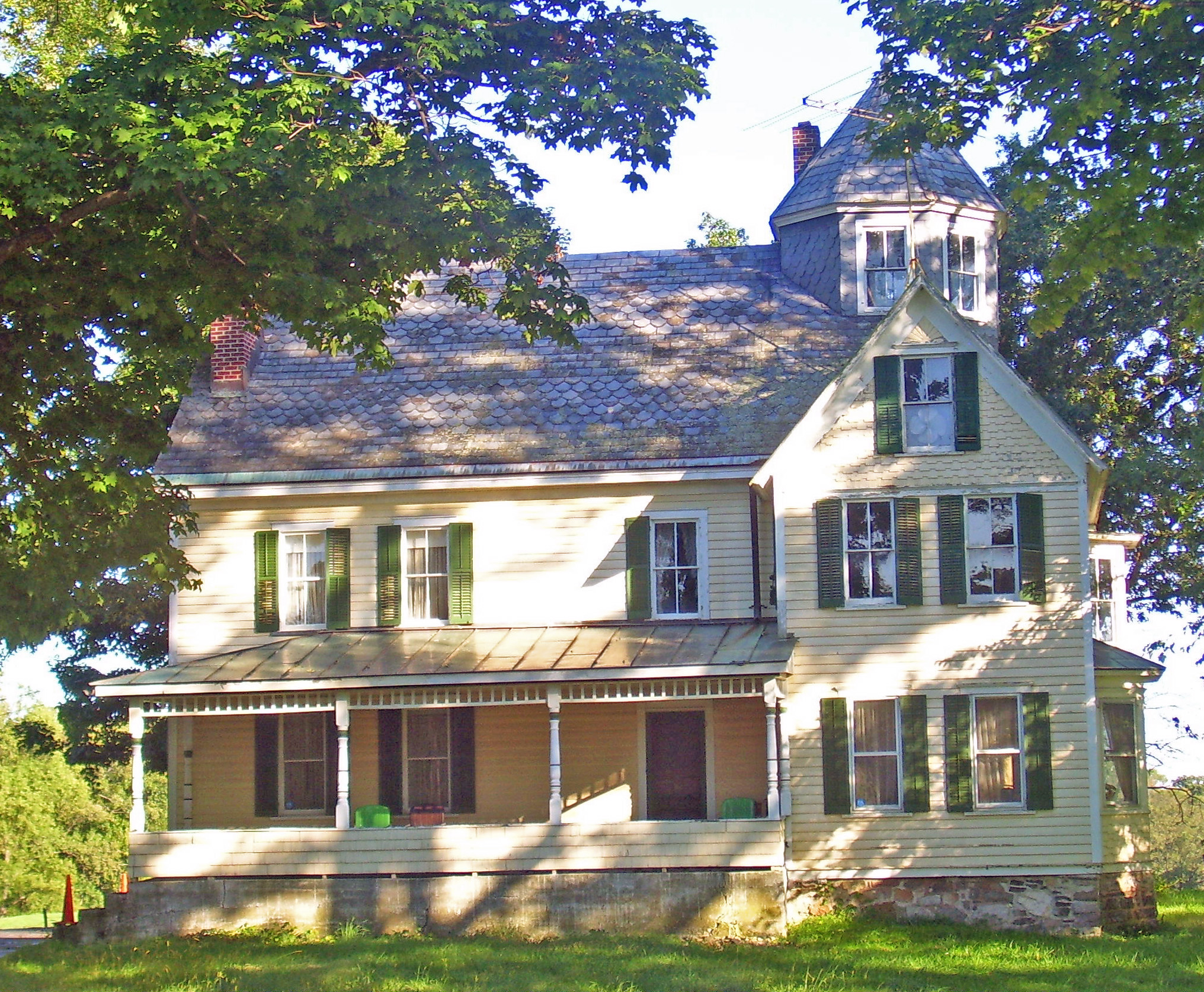
- West elevation, 2008

- Location within New York Location within the United States
- Location: River Rd, Montgomery, New York
- Coordinates: 41°32′43″N 74°12′49″W
- Area: 98 acres (40 ha)
- Built: 1800
- Architectural style: Queen Anne, Federal
- NRHP reference No.: 95000211
- Added to NRHP: March 10, 1995

Peachcroft, sometimes referred to as the James Wilson Brown House, is located along River Road (Orange County Route 29) between Walden and Montgomery in the Town of Montgomery, New York, United States. It is built in a combination of the Federal and Queen Anne architectural styles.

The former came from Brown, the original builder of the house; the latter from renovations by the Millspaugh family, who moved in in the later 19th century and established many businesses, among them a furniture store still in business Walden. Peachcroft remains the center of a working farm of almost a hundred acres that backs on the Wallkill River. In 1994 it and three outbuildings were listed on the National Register of Historic Places.

== Property ==
The house and farm are along the east side of River Road 1.3 miles (2.1 km) southwest of Walden. Mature trees surround the house, with the outbuildings to its northeast. The 98-acre (40 ha) farm extends to both sides of the road. The surrounding land on either side of the road is fields bounded by woodlots. Its south boundary is the river. Its other boundaries are with neighboring farms, with some houses on nearby small roadside lots being the only other development in the area.

A short unpaved driveway leads from River Road to the house. It is a two-and-a-half-story, three-bay frame house on a raised stone foundation. It is topped by a gabled roof shingled in fish-scale slate. A tower with an octagonal peaked roof and finial rises from the south end, and a brick chimney from the north (the tower has a small brick chimney as well). Most of the house is sided in clapboard, except for the gable of a projecting extension on the south end of the west (front) facade, done in cedar shake and the front and side, shingled in asbestos.

The front facade has a porch, with a shallow pitched hipped roof supported by turned columns running all the way to the addition. The projecting front bay, two stories in height, has a gabled roof of its own.

The interior follows a side hall plan. Inside trim reflects both the Federal and Victorian eras. From the former are the two keystone arches on either side of the parlor mantel, and the cherry spindles and banister on the second floor and attic. At that level, the ribs of the house's original gambrel roof are still visible inside.

The outbuilding complex is dominated by an old barn, a two-and-a-half-story frame building with an extension of similar height. The original section is faced in wide horizontal siding while the extension is done in novelty siding. A nearby shed and chicken coop are the other two contributing outbuildings.

== History ==
The earliest known owner of the property was Philip Millspaugh, a German Palatine immigrant to the region in the early 18th century. A contemporary map shows him on the property in 1734. An old door still in the attic of Peachcroft may be a remnant of his house.

The oldest portion of the current farmhouse appears to date to around 1800. The Millspaugh family kept the property until 1870, when Catherine Millspaugh sold it to Robert Wilson Brown for $10,000 ($255,000 in contemporary dollars). He had made a fortune in the California gold rush and mainly used the house as an investment property. In 1891 he gave it to his daughter and her new husband as a wedding gift.

Jonathan Hawkins, Brown's son-in-law and grandfather of the present owner, hired a carpenter from Montgomery to renovate the house. At this time the gambrel roof was covered over with the gable and the tower added, so Hawkins could watch over the whole property. The front wing was added as well. Hawkins named the property Peachcroft, since that was one of his initial crops, along with potatoes and sheep.

He died in 1933 and the property passed to his son, Clarence. The son's major change to the property was to split off a small lot on the west and sell it for the construction of two houses. For a long time these were the only ones visible from the farmhouse. Upon his death, it became the property of his wife and son, and finally that of the son, Jonathan Curtis Hawkins, alone when the widow died in 1983.

Prior to the listing on the Register Hawkins restored the house. In the late 20th century the town acquired the development rights as part of its farmland preservation efforts.

== See also ==
- National Register of Historic Places listings in Orange County, New York
