= ResCode =

ResCode is a residential design code introduced by the Bracks (ALP) government, in Victoria, Australia in August 2001. It applies to all land zoned for residential use across Victoria and covers buildings up to and including four storeys in height—taller buildings are covered by different policies.

== History ==
ResCode was implemented as a result of negative community perceptions of the effects of its predecessor, the Good Design Guide for Medium Density Housing (GDG), which was a planning initiative of the previous Liberal state government led by Jeff Kennett. The GDG had been introduced in 1995 as part of a broader reform to the Victorian Planning Provisions that aimed to facilitate market-led urban consolidation in established residential areas of Melbourne. One of the main complaints about the GDG was that it allowed developers to build higher-density (multi-unit) developments almost anywhere, which was damaging or destroying the local neighbourhood character. Notably, protection of neighbourhood character was one of the principal guidelines within the GDG that needed to be followed.

Before these changes, many single dwellings did not require a planning permit, leading to amenity impacts like overlooking and overshadowing that the new system sought to address. This resulted in many houses, especially two-storey houses, overlooking and overshadowing other houses in a neighbourhood.

Unlike the GDG, ResCode does not exist as a separate policy document. Instead, its provisions are incorporated into all Victorian local government planning schemes and the Victorian Building Regulations.

== Main regulatory features ==
ResCode makes neighbourhood character the primary criterion for assessing residential development applications in Victoria. While a range of local as well as state planning policies (such as Melbourne 2030) concerning amenity and environmental sustainability must be taken into account by development applications and those assessing them, the code's central (and most well-known) features are clauses concerning neighbourhood character.

In this regard, ResCode contains a number of requirements that were carried over from the GDG, such as the need to identify neighbourhood character by a site analysis for every development proposal, the elements that need to be included in a site analysis and the requirement for a description of how a proposed design responds to the neighbourhood character of the site. However, where these were previously guidelines, ResCode made them mandatory.

Also, ResCode extends more stringent regulation than its predecessors to such issues as the position of a building on its site, its setback from front and side boundaries, and many other elements of a building's design, including overall height, roof pitch, external colours and materials, and fence heights. There are strict guidelines, covering the type of documentation required and the objectives that need to be satisfied under ResCode in clauses 54 and 55 of the planning scheme.

== Criticisms ==
ResCode has been criticised by many residents' groups and planning academics for not going far enough to limit the allowable changes to neighbourhood character, associated with contemporary residential developments occurring in established residential areas.

There are many, in the design professions, who have been critical of ResCode for its conservative interpretations of neighbourhood character. Many architects regard the degree to which its constraints on aspects of architectural design such as height, roof pitch, materials, fences, and window details limit innovations in design.

Because the neighbourhood character provisions of ResCode apply only to certain types of development, the code cannot regulate those aspects of buildings outside its scope. They are of two main types. Firstly, residential buildings of four or more storeys are subject to different planning policies. Secondly, detached housing on lots above a certain size are exempt from a planning permit and so cannot be assessed under the planning scheme. Developments of both types have been the cause of much community disquiet, but ResCode and its predecessor, the GDG, cannot be held responsible.

== See also ==
- Melbourne 2030
- New Urbanism
- Save Our Suburbs
- Transit Oriented Development
- Urban Design
