= Preservation development =

Model of real-estate development

Preservation development is a model of real-estate development that addresses farmland preservation. It shares many attributes with conservation development, with the addition of strategies for maintaining and operating productive agriculture and silviculture, often in perpetuity. A preservation development is a planned community that allows limited, carefully designed development (typically housing) on a working farm, while placing the majority of productive land under a system of easements and community governance to ensure a continuity of farming and environmental stewardship.

== Goals ==
Preservation development is not a formal planning approach, but an example of goal-oriented environmental planning. Particular characteristics of the land, local market and local agricultural norms influence the tools to be deployed in each case. The successful project should, however, aim to meet several goals:

1. 80% or more of the target parcel's agricultural productivity should be retained.
2. Development should take a form that does not interfere with productive land uses.
3. Legal constructions should make land protections permanent, but flexible.
4. Community Governance and management structures should be created to ensure stewardship of the community.
5. The community should advance public education on the value of rural lands.

== Origins ==
Preservation development was developed in the 1980s in response to rapid farmland loss due to urban sprawl around Boston. Robert Baldwin, Sr. devised the system of interlocking "farmbelt" and "greenbelt" easements. The system, and associated design and community governance tools, was refined through the 1990s on projects around New England. In 2005, this model was expanded into the Southeast, beginning with the 2,300 acre (931 ha) Bundoran Farm, in Charlottesville, Virginia.

== Relationship to other conservation methods ==
In the United States, most land is conserved by a combination of charitable giving and tax incentives. Parcels with ecological, historic or scenic value may be voluntarily placed under conservation easement, which prohibits or significantly limits future development of the land. The landowner may be directly compensated for the easement (Purchase of Development Rights), or the future-development rights may be considered a donation, subject to tax credits offsetting income taxes due. In some US states, the tax credits may be sold to generate income from the transaction. In a few localities, future-development rights may be sold or traded (Transferable development rights), and redeployed in urbanizing areas.

Preservation development is a market-based approach, and does not rely on taxpayer funding or charitable donation. The landowner sells the land. Development and land protections are enacted simultaneously, and the resulting subdivided parcels are sold to individuals. The value of each parcel is increased by adjacency and access to the conserved land, which allows development density significantly below that allowed by zoning.

=== Sustainable development ===
Preservation development is a type of sustainable development wherein the natural carrying capacity of land is considered not only in terms of development but also in agricultural capacity and ecological service. Rather than maximizing development, developers seek a Triple Bottom Line (TBL) balance between social, environmental and economic factors.

=== Smart growth ===
New Urbanism and smart growth promote density, interconnectivity and access to transit as desirable goals of urban planning. Both approaches privilege development in infill locations and brownfields. Preservation Development's focus on greenfield sites with active agriculture and forestry places has placed it outside the mainstream of either movement.

Since 2001, however, New Urbanist planners Duany / Plater-Zyberk have promoted a "transect" zoning approach, recognizing the need to extend Smart Growth approaches to highly urbanized and rural locations. These new codes address development pressure in exurban locations, as does Preservation Development. In this context, Preservation Development is an appropriate settlement pattern for the two or three lowest-density landscape types on the transect, and insufficiently dense for the other categories.

Some communities with zoning influenced by tenets of Smart Growth have embraced preservation development as an additional tool for managing exurban growth.
