= Melbourne 2030 =

Future development plan of Greater Melbourne, Australia

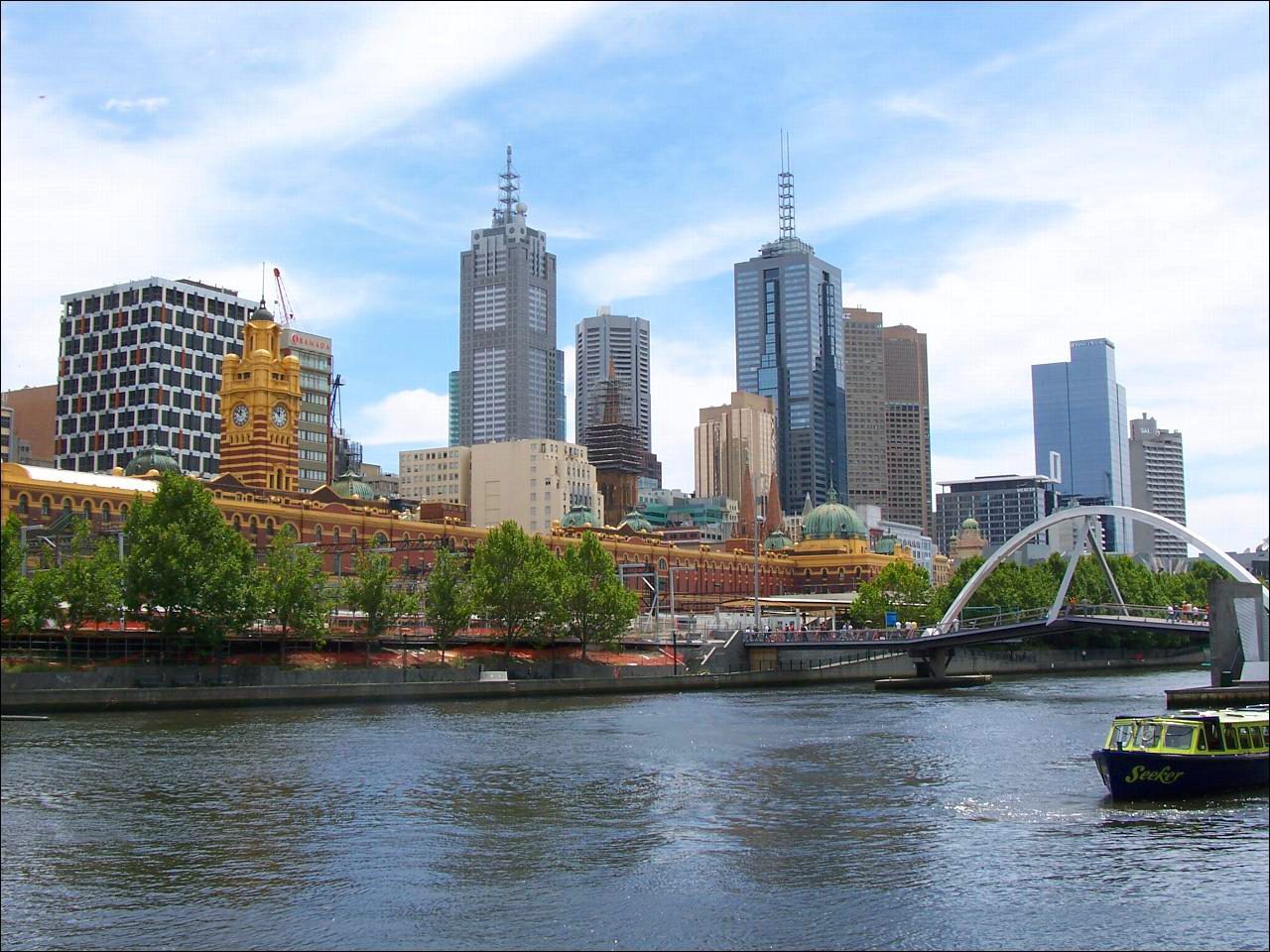
The Yarra River and Melbourne skyline

Melbourne 2030 is a Victoria State Government strategic planning policy framework for the metropolitan area of Melbourne, Australia intended to cover the period 2001–2030. During this period the population of the metropolitan area is expected to grow by a million people to over five million. Population projections now predict Melbourne's population could reach seven million by that time and the government has since changed its strategy on the policy, abandoning the urban growth boundary in the north and west of Melbourne and reducing green wedges.

Introduced by the Bracks government, its main elements are based on well-established planning principles for Transit-oriented development:

- reducing the proportion of new development occurring at low densities on Melbourne's fringe from about 60% of annual construction to 40% by redirecting new development to defined areas of established inner and middle-ring suburbs.
- concentrating development within designated activity centres close to transport nodes. The policy has particular emphasis on public transport over car-based suburbs dependent on the private motor car. However the strategy itself does not detail further investment in the public transport system.
- reducing urban sprawl by establishing legislated urban growth boundaries, with the aim of containing urban development.
- protecting areas of open space known as green wedges left between areas defined by the urban growth boundaries from development.

The existence of Melbourne 2030 gives the Victorian Civil and Administrative Tribunal (VCAT) the policy rationale to determine planning disputes in favour of developments that it judges to be in accordance with the metropolitan strategy's objectives.

The policy was amended in late 2008 to become Melbourne @ Five Million in response to increased population forecasts and an increased demand for housing. The update provisioned for an extended growth boundary and is reinforcing the aim of a multi-centre metropolitan area by lifting the hierarchic level of six Principal Activity Centres (PAC) to Central Activities Districts (CAD). The centres of Box Hill, Bundoora, Cranbourne, Doncaster, Geelong, Oakleigh, Frankston and Melton will thus have to provide similar services and functions as central Melbourne.

== Outline ==
=== Activity Centres ===
- Central Activities Districts (CAD)

Seven centres including the Hoddle Grid, also known as the central business district (CBD) or 'City'. These areas require excellent connections to public transport.

- Principal, Major and Specialised Activity Centres

Approximately 100 principal, major and specialised activity centres of varying sizes, with strong links to public transport

- Neighbourhood Activity Centres

Approximately 900 local neighbourhood activity centres

==== Central Activities Districts (CAD) ====
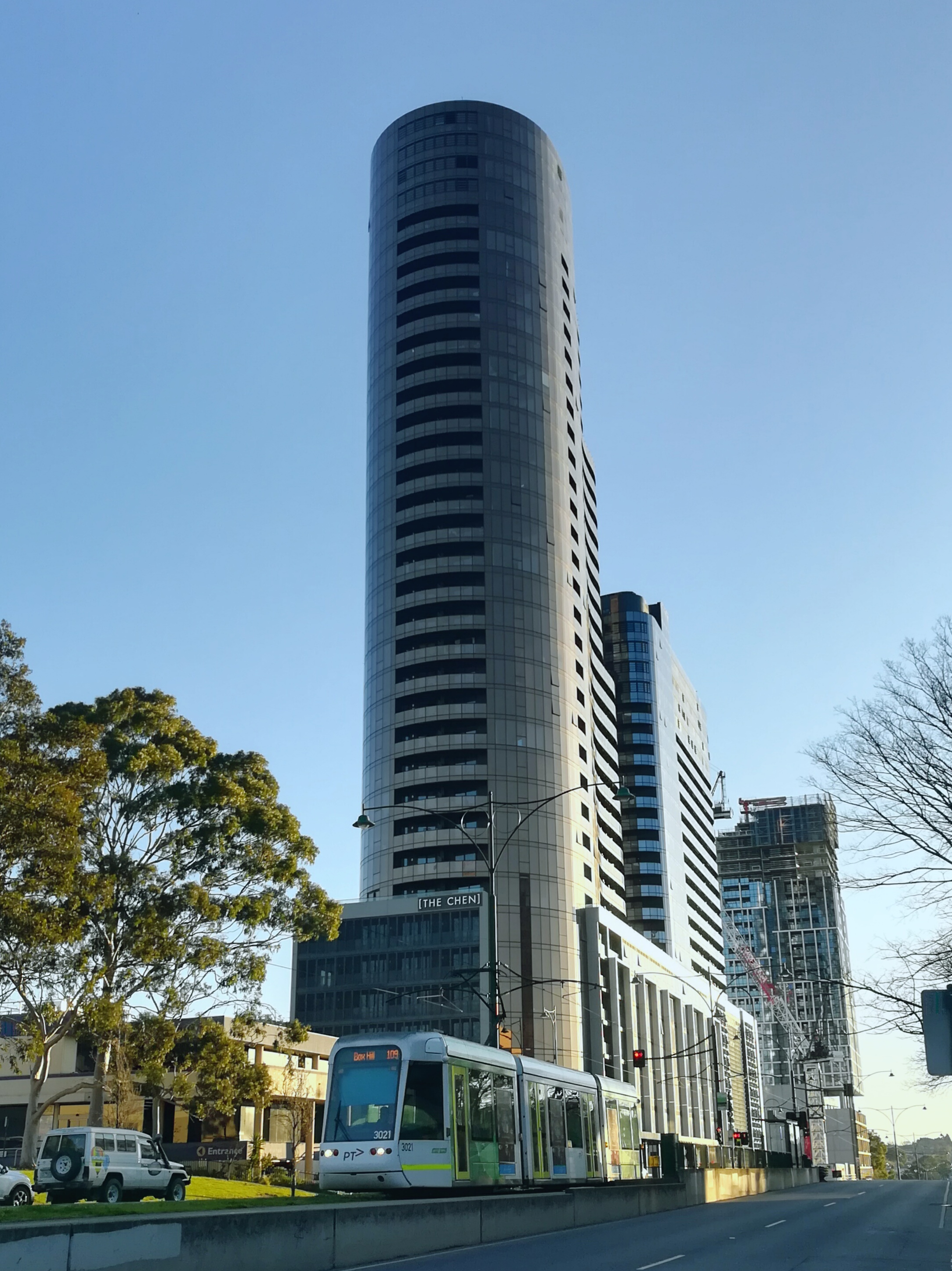
A tram passing high-rise apartment buildings in suburban Box Hill, 14 km east of the CBD

- The Hoddle Grid, central business district (CBD) or 'City'.
- Box Hill
- Bundoora
- Cranbourne
- Doncaster
- Frankston
- Geelong
- Oakleigh
- Melton

==== Principal Activity Centres ====
- Airport West
- Camberwell Junction
- Caroline Springs
- Chadstone
- Cheltenham, Southland
- Coburg
- Dandenong
- Forest Hill
- Footscray
- Glen Waverley
- Langwarrin
- Maribyrnong, Highpoint
- Moonee Ponds
- Mernda
- Narre Warren, Fountain Gate
- Plenty
- Prahran/South Yarra
- Preston, High Street
- Preston, Northland
- Sydenham
- Wantirna South, Knox Central
- Werribee
- Tarneit

==== Major Activity Centres ====
There are 93 Major Activity Centres, including: Altona, Altona Gate (Altona North), Brunswick, Cheltenham, Eltham, Kew, Ivanhoe, Mordialloc, Mornington, Nunawading, The Pines (Doncaster East), Preston, Rosebud, Sandringham, South Melbourne, St Kilda, Williamstown.

== Criticisms and controversy ==
Melbourne 2030 has been subject to criticism concerning the basis of some of its policy objectives, inconsistencies between policies, poor implementation and departures from its principles by the Victorian government.

Monash University published a critique of the policy in its book "Melbourne 2030: Planning Rhetoric Versus Urban Reality".

The Melbourne media has also published several stories about the flaws in the policy.

=== Policy objectives ===
Encouraging intensification in activity centres sustains existing development pressure in some of the oldest parts of inner-city and middle-ring suburbs that are also often heritage precincts. The National Trust of Victoria has expressed concern about the effect on inner city heritage areas, particularly in sensitive suburbs such as Carlton, Fitzroy, Collingwood and South Yarra. Some media commentators claimed that the policy would destroy Melbourne's character.

Some of the organisations that have spoken out against Melbourne 2030's objectives:

- Collingwood Action Group – specifically with regard to the development of Smith Street
- Sunshine Residents and Ratepayers Association

A large rally was held in 2004 by community groups in opposition to the policy.

=== Inconsistencies of opponents ===
Opponents of the blueprint are inconsistent in their arguments against the Melbourne 2030 blueprint. For example, although much criticism has been directed at increasing density in the inner suburbs of Melbourne, opponents are also highly critical of the releasing of new land on the fringes of Melbourne. The Victorian Government has been continuously blocked from increasing density in existing suburban areas, such as the City of Boroondara, by "residents' groups" who continuously object to new medium-density developments, greatly hindering the progress of the blueprint.

However, it is these same groups who oppose the urban sprawl of Melbourne, the only other option short of refusing residence to new arrivals.

=== Policy inconsistencies ===
The Public Transport Users Association criticised the target of 20% of motorised trips transferring to public transport by 2020, claiming that the existing system is at capacity and could not cope with a tripling of users without expansion and increased frequency of services. Transport experts such as Paul Mees and others have argued that the capacity of the current system could be increased if management practices were improved, and many have called for the system to be returned to public administration when the contracts with private operators expire in November 2007. Furthermore, public transport advocates are doubtful about the capability of the privatised transport system to handle increased patronage without a large increase government investment, although little is envisaged by the strategy. After taking over the role as transport minister, Lynne Kosky, conceding that the goal was becoming impossible to reach described the 2020 aim as always only having been "aspirational goal" rather than a policy.

Other infrastructure concerns included the availability of water for the growing metropolis. Victorian opposition leader Ted Baillieu has criticised the policy of "no new dams" while allowing the population to increase by another million.

=== Policy implementation ===
The high-profile resistance campaign against the redevelopment proposals for Camberwell railway station, headed by Geoffrey Rush, provide an example of how politically difficult it could be to implement policies for intensification of suburban activity centres.

To achieve the objectives, the State Government stripped local councils of many of their planning powers and escalating decisions to VCAT. This has caused much controversy and many councils have become unsure of their role in the planning process.

Many felt that the policy had become further flawed by the underestimated population projections contained in the report when figures were released showing higher than expected population growth for Melbourne.

=== Policy departures ===
At the same time, proponents have been critical of the implementation of Melbourne 2030 with many believing that the government is abandoning key aspects of the strategy. For example, after a boom in new housing construction in outer Melbourne, the government released more land for outer suburban development beyond the urban growth boundary. Other policies, such as the construction of freeways (including the 45 kilometre EastLink tollway, Pakenham Bypass, Craigieburn Bypass and Peninsula Link) and upgrading of existing freeway systems (including the CityLink tollway, Monash Freeway, and West Gate Freeway) appear to many to be at odds with Melbourne 2030.

== Other Planning policies ==
- Postcode 3000 – 1990s
- ResCode – a design guide for medium-density housing in Melbourne which came into effect on 24 August 2001
- Transport and Livability Statement – delivered on 17 May 2006
- Green belt
- Melbourne @ 5 million
- Plan Melbourne

== See also ==
- Transport in Melbourne
- Transit-oriented development
- Urban Design
- Sustainability
- Save Our Suburbs
