= Genesee Valley Conservancy =

Non-Profit Land Trust

The Genesee Valley Conservancy
- Founded: 1990
- Location: Geneseo, New York
- Region served: Genesee River watershed
- Website: www.geneseevalleyconservancy.org

The Genesee Valley Conservancy (GVC) is a non-profit land trust based in Geneseo, New York, United States, that exists to protect land in the Genesee River watershed. Founded in 1990, GVC works "to protect the habitat, open space, and farmland of the Genesee Valley region." GVC has completed projects in Livingston, Erie, Monroe, Ontario, Wyoming. and Allegany counties. A full-time staff completes the daily operations of GVC, with assistance from part-time staff, interns, and volunteers. GVC is governed by a board of directors, and supported by members.
