= Farmland preservation =

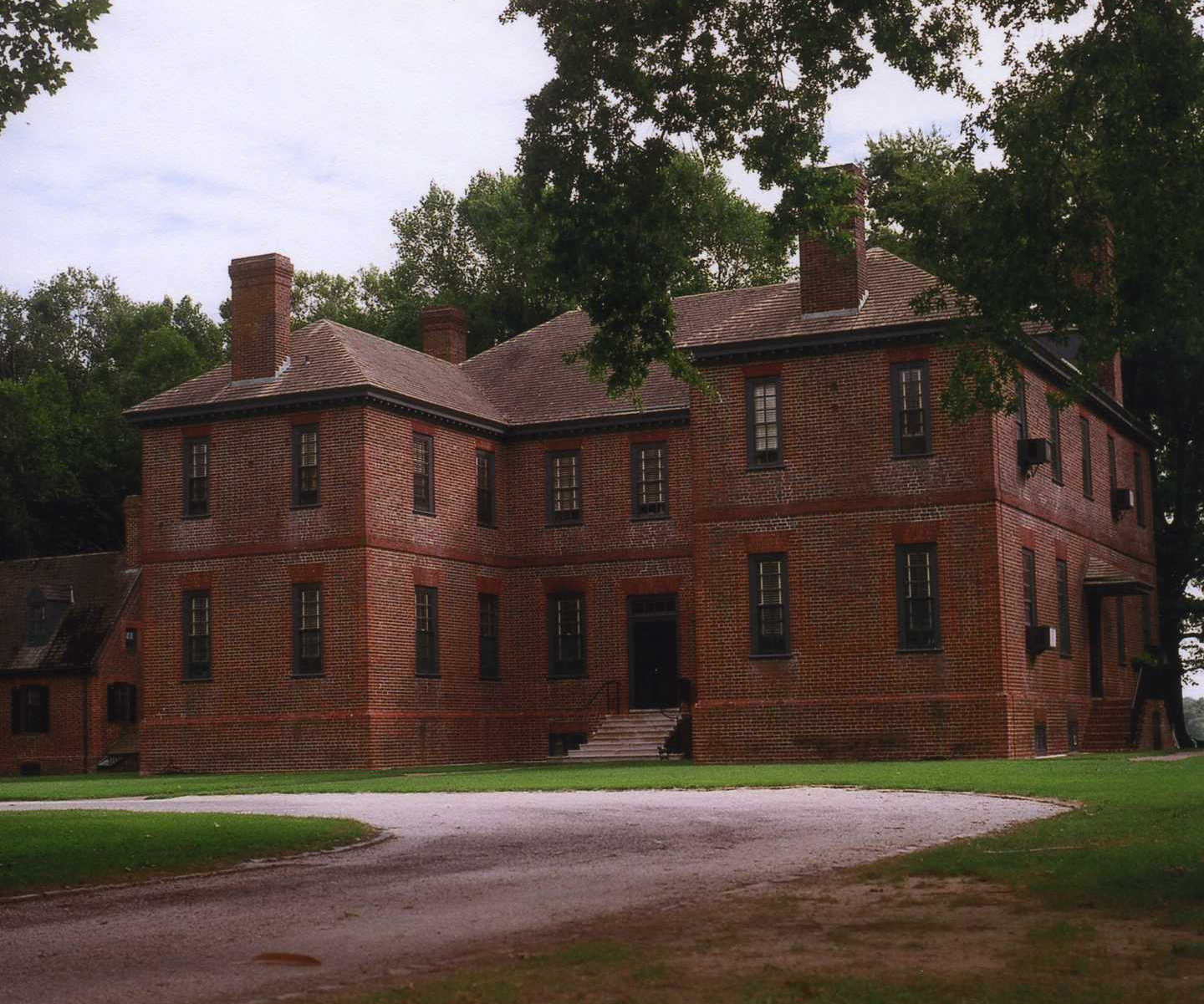
Elsing Green in Virginia, which was granted an easement to preserve the land

Farmland preservation is a joint effort by non-governmental organizations and local governments to set aside and protect examples of a region's farmland for the use, education, and enjoyment of future generations.

Programs in the United States are operated mostly at state and local levels by government agencies or private entities such as land trusts and are designed to limit conversion of agricultural land to other uses that otherwise might have been more financially attractive to the land owner. Through different government programs and policy enactments farmers are able to preserve their land for growing crops and raising livestock. Every state provides tax relief through differential (preferential) assessment. Easements are a popular approach and allow the farms to remain operational. Less common approaches include establishing agricultural districts, using zoning to protect agricultural land, purchasing development rights, and transferable development rights. It is often a part of regional planning and national historic preservation efforts. Farmland preservation activities have been taking place across the United States, such as in Virginia, Minnesota, Maryland, Florida, and Connecticut.

== History ==
New Jersey passed the Farmland Assessment Act of 1964 to mitigate the loss of farmland to rapid suburban development through the use of favorable tax assessments. The act dealt with how the land is assessed for taxes based on the productivity level of the land. The thinking behind this act was that by helping cut the taxes on the farmland, local farmers would be more likely to stay in business. By the late 1970s the value of farmland had outstripped the tax benefits of the act, so the state purchased deed restrictions on farms through the Agriculture Retention and Development Act of 1981. The 1981 law authorized the state to purchase easements on farm land to prevent the construction and rezoning of these areas for industrial, commercial, residential, or other land uses. As of 2022 the law has helped save some 2,800 farms, amassing 247,517 acres (1,001.67 km^{2}). Regional efforts in Monmouth County, New Jersey include the Navesink Highlands Greenway, a project of the Monmouth County Farmland Preservation Program, which, along with the Monmouth Conservation Foundation, purchased the development rights of the Holly Crest Farm in Middletown in September 2008 for US$2.5 million. Over 20 percent of county farmlands and open spaces are permanently preserved. This area is delineated as a land-trust which means that the land itself is publicly owned, so when purchasing a home, the purchaser is buying the building itself and also entering a long-term lease with the land-owning entity. The land trust covers some 665 acres (2.69 km^{2}) and covers a variety of rural to urban communities. Managed by an executive board and a board of trustees, the trust makes decisions regarding land-use following principles of conservation and sustainability.

The American Farmland Trust (AFT) was established in 1980 to preserve farmland and promote sustainable farming practices. Since its inception, the AFT has grown to be one of the largest farmland conservation groups in the nation boasting 7,100,000 acres (29,000 km^{2}) protected and $117 billion accrued through their efforts. Their goal in doing all of this is that they will be able to keep farmers on the land by supporting them economically so the farmers can also adopt more conservation minded farming practices. By adopting conservation minded practices, they believe in the long-term success of the farms promoting a healthy ecosystem and water table that also produces adequate amounts of crops for the growing world population.

The Genesee Valley Conservancy, a public land trust, was founded in western New York in 1990. The trust includes some 32,787 acres (132.68 km^{2}) along the Genesee River watershed. The scope of the project is to protect habitats, open spaces, and farmland. In order to protect the land in the valley, they hope to add a nature preserve and expand upon existing ones. In order to increase their visibility and community understanding within the region they plan on providing educational and recreational opportunities. In order to increase and diversify funding they plan on outlining specific plans for funding of projects in hopes that having defined goals will help bring on new support.

== Farmland management ==
Conservation easement is one approach used to manage protected farms. There are different government programs that invest in conservation easement of farmlands, including the Agricultural Conservation Easement Program (ACEP) managed by the U.S. Department of Agriculture (USDA). The goal of the program is to maintain current farms to preserve existing land for only agriculture uses. The program protects grazing interests of livestock and the health of the land for the growing of agriculture. Participants such as non-profit organizations, local governments and Indian tribes can obtain funds to purchase agricultural land easements.

A transferable development rights (TDR) program offers landowners financial incentives or bonuses for the conservation and maintenance of agricultural land. TDR programs have been established in over 200 U.S. communities in several states. Land developers can purchase the development rights of certain properties within a designated "sending district" and transfer the rights to another "receiving district" to increase the density of their new development. It provides more land for growing crops because it zones off plots of land to be growth zones. This allows for farmlands to not be sold for development and be preserved for agriculture.

Several additional laws have been enacted to preserve farmland. The U.S. Farmland Protection Policy Act (FPPA) established a national policy to ensure that federally-funded programs do not develop land designated for agricultural purposes. The FPPA protects farmland from federal funded construction and other government projects that require the acquisition of property.

There are many programs for farmland management, there are also government programs to help the land that the crops grow on. In the federal Conservation Reserve Program, the Farm Service Agency (FSA) trades a year rental payment to remove certain parts of the land in order for the soil to improve. This program helps farmers take care of their land by getting support to help improve water and soil quality. It manages the health of the farmland.

== Preservation efforts ==
=== Virginia ===
In 2019, Virginia's Office of Farmland Preservation allocated matching funds to local programs that purchased development rights of farmland. That year, the program was able to preserve 14,163 acres (57.32 km^{2}) by matching $12,085,163.61 to funds raised by local programs. The Elsing Green is a 2,254 acre historic, Colonial Virginia plantation that granted the Virginia Historic Landmarks Commission a preservation easement in 1980. This easement will ensure that the green and its surrounding areas will be protected from demolition, inappropriate development, and any future commercial development. The green was also placed on the Virginia Landmarks Register (VLR) on May 13, 1969. Similarly, the Oatlands Historic House & Gardens is a 263 acres (1.06 km^{2}) plantation that was donated to the National Trust for Historic Preservation by the daughters of its final owner. The site was designated as a National Historic Landmark by the National Park Service.

=== Maryland ===
The largest area in Maryland preserved through easements was located in Kent County, where 1,365 acres (5.52 km^{2}) were preserved through $5,850,144.98 worth of easements. The Hampton National Historic Site in Baltimore County is a 63 acres (0.25 km^{2}) preservation that includes the historic Hampton Mansion, gardens, historic farm buildings, slave quarters, and a family cemetery. In the face of suburban expansion and farming becoming less viable, the Ridgely family decided to sell the remaining property to the National Park Service. The site was restored before reopening in 1950. In 2023, the Maryland Agricultural Land Preservation Foundation was able to permanently preserve 4,600 acres (19 km^{2}) of farmland by using $16,76732.23 in easements.

=== Minnesota ===
The Minnesota Land Trust has preserved approximately 79,421 acres (321.41 km^{2}) that span across 698 projects. The largest deal made by the trust was in 2021, with the purchase of 4 parcels valued at $4.2 million. Upon purchase, the land was donated to St. Louis County, who will manage the land for recreation, wildlife, and sustainable time harvest. In 2024, the Krueger Christmas Tree Farm completed easements that would preserve 36 of the 46 acres (0.19 km^{2}) on their farm.

=== Florida ===
In 2023, Florida Agriculture Commissioner Wilton Simpson helped secure $300 million in funding for the Rural and Family Lands Protection Program (RFLPP). The program intends to provide funds easements for these farms, which in turn serve as a buffer to the Florida Wildlife Corridor. The state Department of Agriculture released rankings of 257 farms and placed Trailhead Blue Springs at first, which is a 12,098 acres (48.96 km^{2}) cow ranch. The largest of these projects is the Adams Ranch in Osceola County, which is 24,027 acres (97.23 km^{2}) and is used for cattle production. In a joint effort by Conservation Florida and the Natural Resources Conservation Service (USDA), easements were placed on the XL Ranch Lightsey Cove that helped protect 527 acres (2.13 km^{2}) along the Florida Wildlife Corridor. This ranch is also located within the Avon Park Air Force Range Sentinel Landscape, which covers nearly 1,700,000 acres (6,900 km^{2}) and homes, parts of the Everglades Headwaters National Wildlife Refuge and Conservation Area.

=== Connecticut ===
In Connecticut, the Farmland Preservation Program has preserved over 45,300 acres (183 km^{2}) of land across 373 farms. This includes the historic Maple Bank Farm, which was offered an easement to preserve 51 of its 80 acres (0.32 km^{2}) property. In 2009, the program engaged in a three-way deal with the Connecticut Department of Agriculture and USDA to preserve Winsneke Farm. The deal was the first in the history of the program to include the State of Connecticut, a land trust, and a federal agency. After a 3-year application process, the town of Southington and the Farmland Preservation Program split the purchase of development rights to Karabin Farms in 2021. This purchase protected over 1,000 acres (4.0 km^{2}) in farmland and ensured that the farm would still remain operational.

== Partial list of preserved farms ==
- Elsing Green (Virginia)
- Oatlands Plantation (Virginia)

== See also ==
- Agricultural Land Reserve (British Columbia)
- Agricultural preservation restriction program (Sunderland, MA)
- Development-supported agriculture
- Comprehensive Conservation Enhancement Program (US)
- Preservation development
