= Agriculture Retention and Development Act =

The Agriculture Retention and Development Act was created as part of New Jersey's efforts to counteract the loss of farmland in the state. The legislation formed the basis needed for the state to purchase the easements of New Jersey farms in order to ensure they remain as farms, and could never be sold for housing or for non-farming commercial development. The effect was to slow farmland loss in the state. The farmland preservation efforts made in New Jersey have effectively kept the farms as private land with a public legacy of permanent farm status. As of July 2022, New Jersey has permanently preserved 2,800 farms covering 247,517 acres.

== History ==
In his message to the Legislature in January, 1971, Governor William T. Cahill announced his firm belief in the need for a Blueprint Commission on the Future of New Jersey Agriculture. This followed the desires of the agricultural community as expressed in resolutions of the State Agricultural Convention, which in turn had been generated earlier by the concern of leading farm organizations. Later in the year, Governor Cahill directed Secretary of Agriculture Phillip Alampi to create the Commission, assume its leadership, and to appoint the members of the Commission. The initial meeting of the Commission was held in mid-September, at which time the outline of work prepared at staff level was approved by the Commission. The first phase of the work was started immediately by establishing eight task forces. These groups covered business climate, research and education, production, marketing, management and commercial services, land and water resources, agribusiness, and organizations. The second phase of the program was implemented shortly after the task forces began their work. This effort centered on the real issue of establishing a permanent land base for a continuing agriculture in the Garden State.

Published in April 1973, the Report off the Blueprint Commission states:

"Agriculture in New Jersey operates in the most densely populated area in the nation, hence has both problems and opportunities. Farmland declined rapidly from 1954 to 1968, and has substantially slowed down since then, due, in part, to the Farmland Assessment Act. There are presently about 1.1 million acres in farms in the state, which is over 600,000 acres less than in 1950. Due largely to forces external to itself, agriculture in New Jersey is operating under the influence of an impermanence syndrome which leads to short-term decision making, less investment in agricultural enterprises, and slower technological adaptation. This can be corrected by creating a permanent land preserve for agricultural production and by making it feasible for farmers to farm this land and make a profit. This report addresses itself to both of these objectives."

In November 1981, voters approved the concept of the Farmland Preservation Program and passed the $50 million Farmland Preservation Bond Act to fund it.

On January 23, 1983, Governor Tom Kean signed the Agriculture Retention and Development Act into legislation. The Act enabled the establishment of County Agriculture Development Boards (CADB's) and specified their membership and function, provided for the establishment of voluntary farmland preservation programs, and authorized the purchase of development easements and the funding of soil and water projects on agricultural land.
