= Residential cluster development =

A residential cluster development, or open space development, is the grouping of residential properties on a development site to use the extra land as open space, recreation or agriculture. It is increasingly becoming popular in subdivision development because it allows the developer to spend much less on land and obtain much the same price per unit as for detached houses. The shared garden areas can be a source of conflict, however. Claimed advantages include more green/public space, closer community, and optimal storm water management. Cluster development often encounters planning objections.

According to William H. Whyte, the author of “Cluster Development” there are two types of cluster development: townhouse development and super development. Examples of townhouse development include Morrell Park, Philadelphia, Pennsylvania, Hartshorne in Richmond, and Dudley Square in Shreveport. Examples of super development include Reston, Virginia, Crofton, Maryland, and Americana Fairfax in Virginia.

== Background ==
Although similar styles of development existed in contexts ranging from medieval villages to the New England town, cluster development was formalized as a modern concept only by the onset of suburban sprawl and ubiquity of detached house developments. The idea of a cluster development was created as the alternative to the conventional subdivision.

The first conscious application of a cluster development was in Radburn, New Jersey, in 1928. It was based on English planning and Ebenezer Howard’s Garden City movement but used principles of cluster development. Following Radburn, many other towns in New Jersey applied those principles to their planning notably the village green in Hillsborough, New Jersey, and Brunswick Hill in South Brunswick. In the rest of the country the use of cluster development grew in principally in Maryland and Virginia, notably in Reston and American Fairfax County.

Currently cluster development is applied all over the United States. There is particularly a strong push for it in the Midwestern States that have had significant problems with urban sprawl, such as Minnesota, Illinois, Ohio, and Wisconsin.

Cluster development, also known as conservation development, is a site planning approach that is an alternative to conventional subdivision development. It is a practice of low-impact development that groups residential properties in a proposed subdivision closer together in order to utilize the rest of the land for open space, recreation or agriculture. Cluster development differs from a planned unit development (PUD), which contains a mix of residential, commercial, industrial, or other uses, but the cluster development primarily focuses on residential areas.

== Purpose ==
The purpose of cluster development is to:

1. promote integrated site design that is considerate to the natural features and topography
2. protect environmentally sensitive areas of the development site, as well as permanently preserve important natural features, prime agricultural land, and open space
3. minimize non-point source pollution through reducing the area of impervious surfaces on site
4. encourage saving costs on infrastructure and maintenance through practices such as decreasing the area that needs to be paved and the decreasing distance that utilities need to be run
5. the primary purpose is to create more area for open space, recreation and more social interaction

== Application ==
The model ordinance for cluster development is section 4.7 in the Smart Growth Codes, issued by the American Planning Association. Along with introducing the concept of residential cluster development, the ordinance outlines the process of application, site planning and implementation.

The primary requisites for application of cluster development are that all principal or accessory uses are allowed and that multifamily dwellings, duplexes, and townhouses are permitted. As well the application of maximal lot coverage, floor area ratios, building height, and parking requirements to the entire site as opposed to the individual lot. Provisions of a cluster development require that the site is at least 2 to 5 acres (20,000 m^{2}) and there is no minimum to lot dimensions; furthermore each house can be no more than 12 feet (3.7 m) from the street with yard that is at least 25 feet (7.6 m). There also needs to be the ability to place more than one principal building on each lot, and lastly no less than 25% of the site is used for open space.

Included in the application, the site plan is required to consist of the street and sidewalk layout, the maximum number and type of dwelling units proposed, and how much area they will occupy, with calculations; as well as the area of parking, open space, and other accessories. To calculate the permitted amount of dwellings, one must measure the gross area of the site in acres and tenths of an acre, then subtract the gross area of the public and private streets and public dedicated improvement; the remainder will be the build able area. Then divide the net build able area by the smallest minimum lot size; round this number to the nearest lower number and the figure will be the maximum number of units.

== Design features ==
There are various distinct design features in cluster development notably: the consideration of natural features/topography, smaller lot sizes, the use of cul-de-sacs, and the use of certain waste/storm water management techniques.

Along with site design, waste/storm water management design features are a principle aspect of cluster development. By the maximizing of over land water flow and the strategic use of landforms and plants to slow, hold, and treat runoff, most stormwater can be handled. As well, there many options to deal with wastewater. Techniques such as community drain fields, irrigation systems, and package plants can dramatically reduce the cost of infrastructure and improve the environment.

== See also ==
- Planned Unit Development – American urban planning process
- Environmental Planning – Considering environment in developing land
- New Urbanism – Urban design movement promoting sustainable land use
