= Elkington Forest =

Coordinates: 48.5282°N 123.5896°W

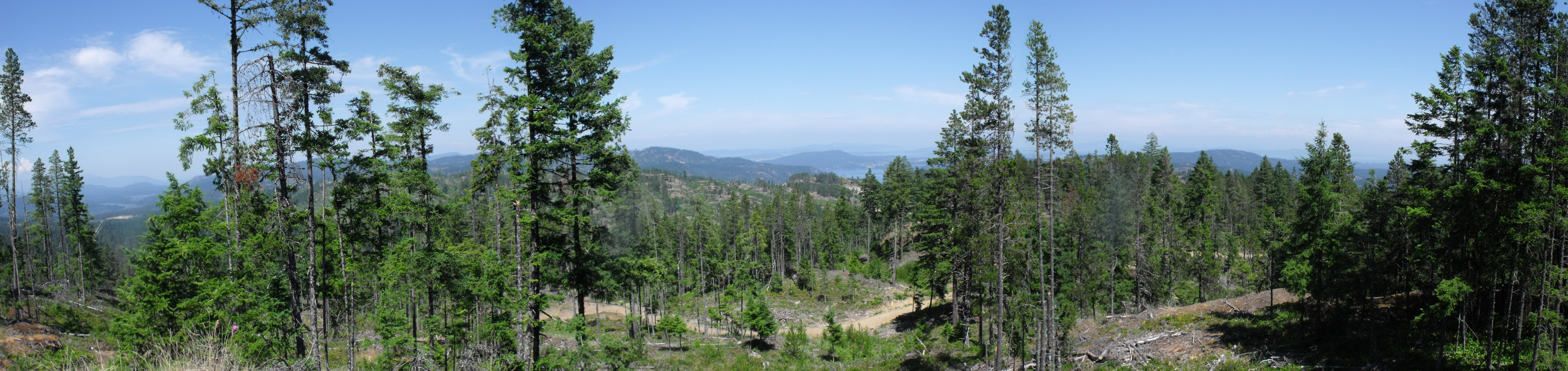
View From The Elkington Forest

Elkington Forest is a 950-acre (3.8 km^{2}) privately managed forest located at the southern boundary of the Cowichan Valley Regional District on Vancouver Island in British Columbia, Canada. Sustainable development is intended for this property. In 2011, the entire parcel land was rezoned from F1 - Forestry to CLS - Community Land Stewardship zone, through which 85% of the land is designated for eco-forestry and conservation use, and 15% of the land is designated for a mix of agricultural uses and residential development. Under this zoning a majority of the residential density and agricultural uses were located on the southern or upland portions of the land. In 2011, Living Forest Communities, in partnership with the Canadian registered charity, the Trust for Sustainable Forestry purchased the southern half of the lands, and began to develop the lands. The installation of light-on-the-land services; roads, sewers, water lines, and power lines began in the summer of 2013. The residential hamlets have been designed in a more European manner, with densely clustered homes located around a community green space with a community centre and coffee shop.

In April of 2017, the ownership of the southern portion of the Elkington lands transferred to the first mortgage holders and development of the community has been slow. The new owners of the land have renamed the project to Malahat Forest Estates, and as of the summer of 2022, have sold off the first 18 residential lots to third party owners. The Land Conservancy of BC continues to hold a restrictive covenant over the protected forest lands, and The Trust for Sustainable Forestry continues to own the timber rights on the portions of the covenanted lands that were designated for eco-forestry.

While the new owners of the Malahat Forest Estates do not advertise this development as a conservation community, the original concept has been retained through the initial design, the use of covenants and the assignment of timber right to a registered environmental charity.
