= Urban consolidation =

Urban consolidation describes the policy of constraining further development and population growth to within the boundaries of preexisting urban areas rather than expanding outward into suburban areas. Urban consolidation seeks to increase the population density of a given urban area by expanding upward, redeveloping preexisting buildings and lots, and constructing new facilities in available spaces. It is theorized that discouraging urban sprawl and encouraging further development of housing units in preexisting urban areas will lead to a net gain in social and economic prosperity (e.g. more accessible public transportation, more efficient use of public utilities, and increased affordability of housing).

A major feature of modern urban consolidation practices is the incorporation of urban green space and open space areas. In higher density environments, incorporating natural settings into the landscape design can have positive impacts, such as increased happiness, decreased stress, and a reduction in maintenance costs. There are broadly three kinds of urban consolidation: Market-led consolidation of existing residential areas involves residential redevelopment of established dwellings as well as non-residential land and buildings at higher densities than the metropolitan average. Transit-oriented development involves high-density residential and mixed-use buildings within walkable precincts around public transport nodes, often referred to as activity centres. The third approach is to require that all new development on the urban fringe of existing metropolitan areas is at higher densities than the current average for those cities.

== History ==
The term "urban consolidation" first appears in social science and urban planning literature around the late 19th and early 20th centuries. Much of the existing literature on urban consolidation comes from Australia. Some of the world's first government-official urban consolidation policies were enacted in Sydney and Melbourne to increase construction of higher-density terrace housing in the late 19th century. Throughout the 20th century, implementation of urban consolidation policies appear to come in 'waves', separated by population surges stemming from major events like World War I and II. Urban consolidation policies began to appear in the United States around the same time, with one of the earliest examples being a proposal for the consolidation of railroad lines in Iowa and Minnesota to increase the capacity and efficiency of existing passenger and freight traffic.

== Limits of urban consolidation ==
Although urban consolidation policies may have many positive social, economic, and environmental effects, there are limits to the extent of their benefits. Efficiency is a key feature of urban consolidation, but the aspect of infrastructure capacity is often overlooked. As a city's infrastructure is used by an increasing number of people, the systems must be upgraded and retrofitted, a process which can cost hundreds of millions of dollars. Falling under this category of 'capacity' are common features of civilization, such as roads, drainage systems, and open spaces. Roads in areas with urban consolidation policies are often overburdened with increased intercity traffic in addition to the preexisting suburban commuter traffic, and this problem is not always easily solved with transit-oriented development. Drainage systems are severely impacted by higher populations, potentially leading to increased flooding and pollutant runoff. Open spaces in high-density urban areas often conflict with urban consolidation policies; residents of high-density areas require a significantly higher amount of open space, but this would limit development of consolidation-oriented housing and transportation.

== Terminology ==
- Brownfield site: land suspected or known to be contaminated by pollutants from previous industrial and commercial businesses. Urban consolidation policies seek to restore these abandoned spaces into parks and wildlife habitats, sometimes in an effort to make green spaces more accessible to inner city residents.
- Greenfield site: undeveloped and unpolluted land located in a rural or urban area. Urban consolidation aims to develop these areas for retail business, manufacturing, public services, and housing.
- Housing affordability: the price level at which people can purchase or lease houses and apartments while maintaining a sufficient income flow to fulfill basic needs. Urban consolidation policies have been successful at increasing population density through more generally affordable housing.
- Transit-oriented development: the development of public transportation with a core goal of maximizing the number of urban business, residential, and recreational spaces. Replacing car-oriented infrastructure with public transportation and making pedestrian activity a priority is key to increasing and optimizing urban density.

== See also ==
- Activity centre
- Automobile dependency
- Charles Marohn
- Circles of Sustainability
- Compact city
- Green belt
- London Plan
- Medium-density housing
- Melbourne 2030
- Mixed-use development
- New Urbanism
- Sustainable development
- Transit-oriented development
- Urban growth boundary
