= Neighbourhood character =

Neighborhood character refers to the 'look and feel of an area', in particular a residential area. It also includes the activities that occur there. In everyday usage, it can often be synonymous with local character, residential character, urban character and place identity, but those terms can have more specific meanings in connection with urban planning and conservation.

The neighborhood character ascribed to an area can be both descriptive and prescriptive, and may or may not form an explicit component of planning policy. However, planning policies inevitably impact upon the way a place is used and how it feels to be there, along with a range of other social, cultural, ecological, physical, and economic factors that shape human settlements. As interest in the concept of place has increased since the 1970s, urban designers and planners have accordingly become more focused on issues of character. The way that character is regulated varies from place to place, with some planning systems making more overt references to it than others.

Preservation of neighborhood character is often given as a reason for opposition to development of an area.

== Australia ==
Neighbourhood character has become a key term in the planning system of Victoria, Australia. Since 2001, it has been the mandatory starting point for assessing all permit applications for residential development in established urban areas in that state. In its formal use in the planning system, it refers to the qualities that make one neighbourhood distinct from another, and encompasses a range of physical components of the built environment, architectural style, street width and layout, vegetation, fence height and style, and so on. Every urban place has a neighbourhood character.

There has been much dispute in Victoria with regard to the use of this term because of its qualitative aspects, which rely mainly on subjective judgement. The planning system is focused on physical planning and the built environment, but residents groups such as Save Our Suburbs have suggested that the term is too vague on the one hand, and not broad enough on the other as it doesn't incorporate an understanding of the social and cultural character of residential neighbourhoods.

Neighbourhood character is regulated in Victoria through a variety of planning instruments within ResCode, the statutory code for residential development. The Neighbourhood Character Overlay is the most stringent regulatory device and works in a similar way to a heritage control. Its first implementation was for the Hedgeley Dene Gardens precinct in the Melbourne suburb of Malvern East. Since the mid-1990s, local governments in Victoria have begun to develop policies to regulate neighbourhood character and the majority of the 32 Melbourne local governments now possess some form of locally based neighbourhood character policy.

== Canada ==
Neighbourhood character is a prominent term in the Canadian planning system. For example, since its adoption in 1995, Vancouver's strategic policy 'City Plan' has focused on the creation of a city of distinct neighbourhoods, each with its own identity and neighbourhood character.

== UK ==
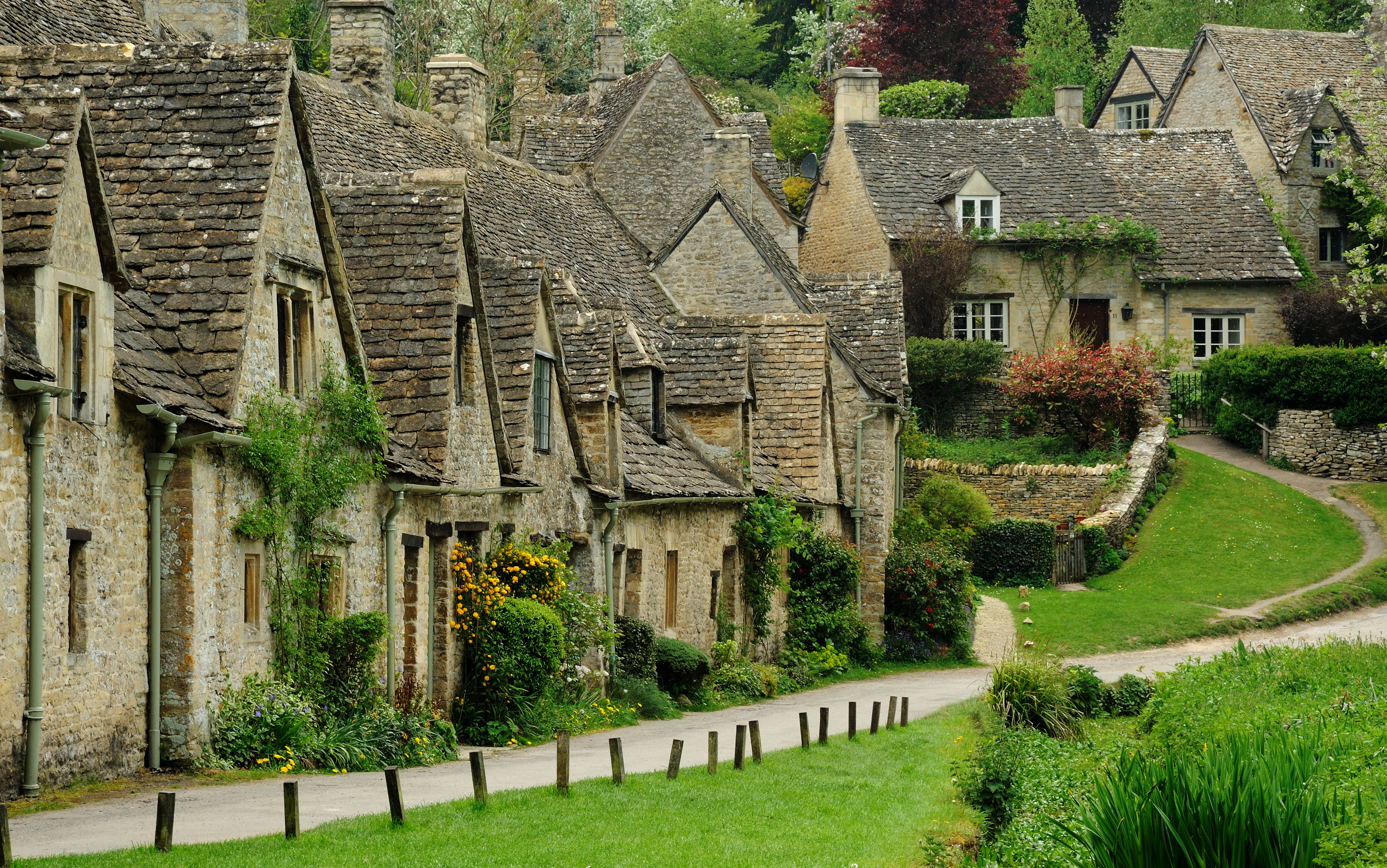
Arlington Row Bibury

Neighbourhood character has become an important issue in planning policy in the UK, as a background study area for informing the Local Development Frameworks of the Core Strategies. This process is ongoing. A detailed and robust study of neighbourhoods is seen as essential to producing future plans for growth. It has been recognised in Brighton & Hove Urban Characterisation Study that people live in neighbourhoods, not character areas.
