= Activity centre =

Term used in urban planning

Activity centre is a term used in urban planning and design for a mixed-use urban area where there is a concentration of commercial and other land uses. For example, the central business districts of cities (CBD) are also known as “Central Activities Districts” (CAD) (also known as Downtown in North America or "Central Activities Zone" in the United Kingdom, in recognition of the fact that commercial functions are not the only things that occur there. The term activity centre can also be used to designate an area for mixed-use development, whatever its current land use happens to be.

== Description ==
Activity centres are a key component of contemporary strategic planning for large dispersed cities like those in Australia, Canada, the US and New Zealand. Examples of such planning include the Melbourne 2030 strategy for Melbourne and the City of Cities metropolitan strategy for Sydney. Activity centres can vary greatly in size from the central districts of large cities to regional commercial areas to neighbourhood shopping centres and strips. They can also refer to specialised agglomerations of activities such as urban university campuses or research institutes. They are an important concept in urban planning for Transit-oriented development or TOD, which seeks to intensify land uses around public transport nodes to facilitate greater sustainability in the way people and goods move around cities.

== Melbourne 2030 ==
“Activity Centres are defined as any place that attracts people for shopping, working, studying, recreation or socializing”. This is a very broad and descriptive definition that is used in Melbourne 2030. The definition was later made more specific in Melbourne @ 5 million, by saying a mixed use centre is where people work, shop, relax, meet friends and family and also live. These centres are usually a reasonable size and are served by public transport of different sizes and intensities (buses, trains, tram and cars cater for most activity centres in Melbourne). This specific definition is meant to be one of the key aspects to Melbourne 2030 Activity Centre Policy being successful in its efforts in the reduction of car dependence.

The ideas of Activity Centres in Melbourne 2030 is no new concept for Melbourne, as it is a reinterpretation of a policy. The issue surrounding this idea is the ability of our State and Local Governments working together and learning from the past mistakes to create a policy where Governments will adopt a “strong regulative approach”.

District Centre Policy of Melbourne was introduced in 1980s and was then later abandoned. This policy was abandoned because of powerful vested interested opposing the restrictions to lower car usage, that planners were applying. The pressure applied by stand-alone shopping centre owners to expand in the end was too great, and the Government gave into their demands. This was only the beginning with State Government landing the largest blow in 1984, when they approved a “major breach of policy” (R. Goodman, S. Moloney, 2004) allowing Coles-Myers to build their headquarters as a stand-alone centre instead of in a district centre. This not only weakened the policy but also gave to other powerful organizations dismissing the District Centre Policy.

Goodman and Moloney have pointed out that the current Government has not learned from previous mistakes. The issues pointed out “lack of including Local Government in the process of selecting centres for designation and future growth, the value of enforceable guidelines and regulation to support the policy and the critical necessity of appropriate funding to enable implementation". Goodman and Moloney believed that State Government could step back and allow “Design to take place at a Local Government level as part of their Planning Scheme Amendment process”. Looking back at past mistakes, the State Government should step back and let Local Government help with the implementation of the policy at the local level, and would also give strong direction for developers to work with.

== Housing and community facilities ==
=== Melbourne's housing and community facilities ===
Melbourne's housing needs have been a focus of activity centre policies and planning policies ever since the city's future growth potential was realised. The intentions of planners regarding housing have been influenced by the contemporaneous (then current) (then existing) social and economic context. It was not until the plan titled ‘Melbourne 2030’, developed in 2002 that a direct connection was made between housing and activity centres, and as such structure plans for activity centres were introduced. That plan however did address roads, transport forms, compactness, economic activity, investment and liveability, and appeared to take the view that community facilities would follow without the need for particular attention in their own right. A number of historical policies, whilst not directly linking housing and activity centres, shaped the suburbs Melbourne has today, and hence are relevant in Melbourne's 2030 Activity centre policy.

=== Melbourne's planning history: housing ===
The 1971 Melbourne Metropolitan Board of Works (MMBW) plan, ‘Planning Policies for the Melbourne Metropolitan Region’ determined Melbourne's Green wedges, and was considered the first policy to address Melbourne's outward growth constrains [3] (Department of Planning and Community Development, 2012). The 1980 and 1981 MMBW's ‘Metropolitan strategy and implementation’ paved the way for future planning policies by encouraging development in existing areas, with a focus on the concentration of housing and community facilities in areas of high accessibility [1]. Melbourne 2030, built on the strategic aims of 1971 and 1981, with the addition of an Urban Growth Boundary (UGB) and a quantified approach to urban consolidation [3].

This brief history of Melbourne's planning in relation to housing and community facilities involved planning scheme changes particularly evident in the 1954 and 1971 plans (‘Melbourne Metropolitan Planning Scheme 1954 Report, Surveys and Analysis’ and ‘Planning policies for the Melbourne metropolitan region’ respectively), and new state policies in 2002 [4].

=== Melbourne’s Housing: Flats, units and the inner suburbs ===
The 1954 plan introduced a residential zoning regime for Melbourne which classified inner urban houses through to fringe development and their density. At this time, the plan did not intend on increasing densities. The 1971 plan predicted limited growth in population. The 1971 plan also introduced building design guidelines to improve the 1960s era trend of what was deemed ‘ugly’ flat development in Melbourne (40% of dwellings constructed in the 1960s in Melbourne were either Flats or Villa Units [3] (Department of Planning and Community Development, 2012)). The 1970s also saw renewed interest in the housing possibilities of inner Melbourne suburbs. The 1981 plan emphasised this trend proposing redevelopment of old inner industrial sites. The city of Melbourne introduced ‘postcode 3000’ in 1992 as an incentive to live in Melbourne's city centre, and by the mid-1990s higher density and diversity housing was occurring in inner suburbs and would eventually spread to middle suburbs.

=== Housing and activity centres ===
Higher density housing in and around activity centres is a core focus of Melbourne's planning community, since the 2002 Melbourne 2030 plan. However the success of Melbourne's activity centres in accommodating higher density housing is not universally agreed. The affordability of higher density housing is of great importance to success in housing planning in Melbourne 2030. However an analysis by [2] Birrell et al. (2005) suggests that; “The housing side of the activity centre strategy has been developed with little real regard to the reality of land availability and cost of construction and development in suburban centres”.

== Transport ==
Many cities like Melbourne have had to deal with population growth, which has brought about an increase in travel movements. This growth has also increased concerns for the environment, congestion and sustainability. It is the goal of activity centre policy to reduce individual car usage and encourage people to use public transport. This idea also means that there is a reduction in fuel consumption, saving money and time and is more efficient in the long term. In order to make public transport an attractive option to get to activity centres without the correct transport infrastructure in place, people turn back to their private forms of transport. This can be seen in a study into Activity Centres under taken by P. McNabb and the University of Melbourne research team in 2001 showed that “75% of trips to Melbourne activity centres were by car”. The use of public transport to access activity centres is one of the key principles outlined in Melbourne 2030 and in many other international activity centre policies. If such policies are to succeed, authorities will need to take responsibility and show a united front to developers and the community by reinforcing this policy, or risk losing another policy to the private sector.

== International examples ==
A large number of European towns and cities have made their city centres car-free since the 1960s. These are often accompanied by car parks on the edge of the pedestrianized zone, and in the larger cases, park and ride schemes. Central Copenhagen in Denmark is one of the largest and oldest examples: the car free zone is centered on Strøget, a pedestrian shopping street, which creates a very large auto free zone. This example of reduction in the use of cars means that there is a large beneficial effect on the amount of emissions released to the atmosphere. These policies however do allow delivery and service vehicles as well as residents cars into exclusion areas. “This lock out of unnecessary car traffic must be an isolated measure, but part of a pull and push approach” (H, Topp and T, Pharaoh, 1994).

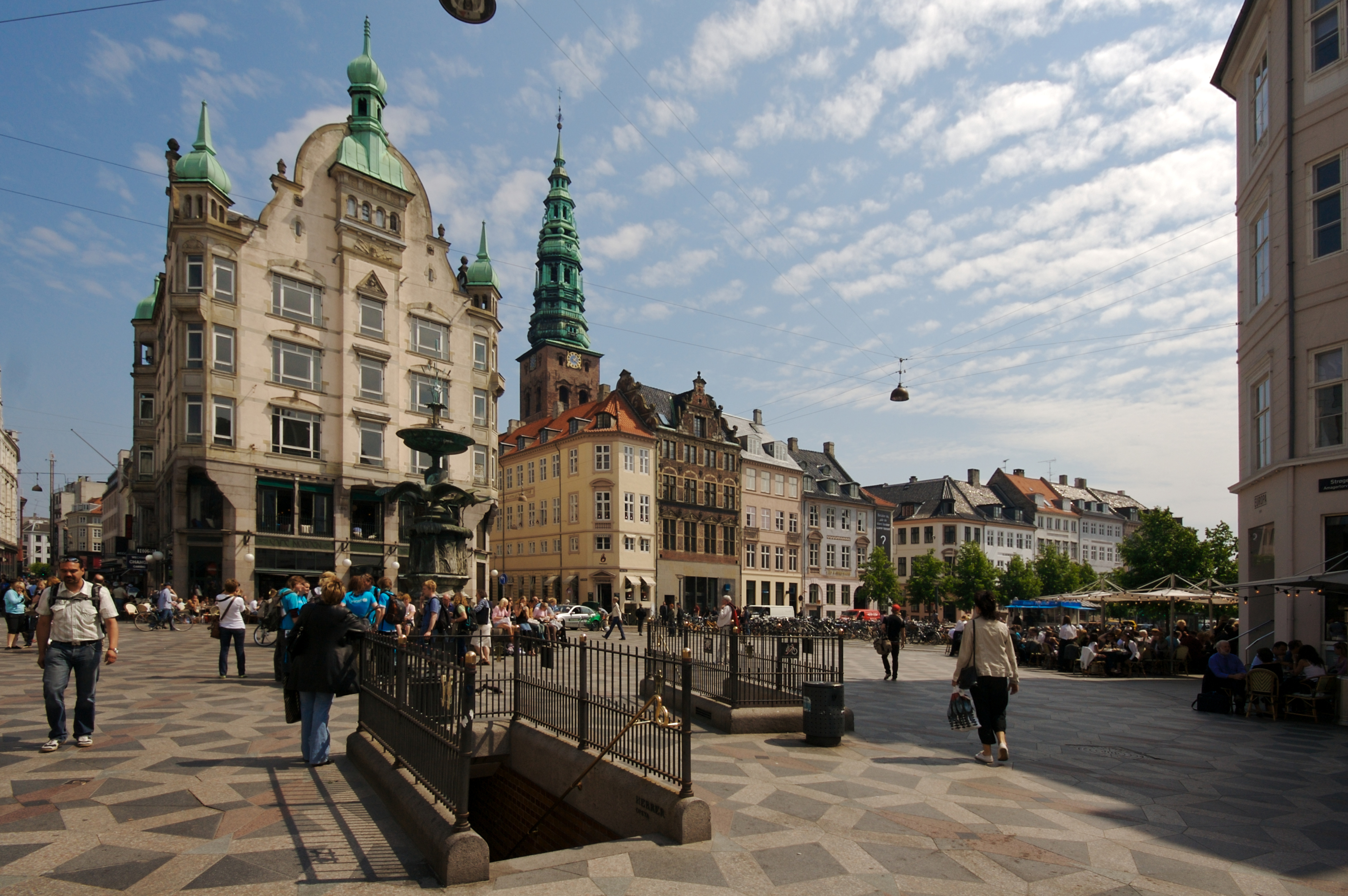
Strøget, a pedestrian, car free shopping area in Copenhagen, Denmark

From the 1990s the city of Utrecht has been implementing the Dutch town planning policy, which is oriented towards the “compact city” concept. The ABC location policy looks at urban development areas and classifies them according to the conditions of transport. “The ABC planning in the major urban areas can be regarded as an example of good practice for the following reasons; it looks at linking urban development with no car traffic planning, orientation towards the compact city concept, it coordinates urban location policies with national and regional government and non-government organization; it uses combinations of pull and push measures in transport policy and offering transport management to companies and businesses via mobility consultancy” (E. Eno, 1996).

In order it deliver good public transport connections governments need to show a strong regulatory approach to individual car usage in and around to activity centres. Some city's around the world have carried this out and achieved car usage reductions. Without improving public transport connections you can only expect increasing private car usage and increased condition and time delays.

== Retail ==
Retail is one of the four main components of activity centres, towards the broader social and environmental sustainability plus economic objectives of the increasingly preferred polycentric approach to planning and managing cities.

Incorporating retail into the activity centre mix of uses provides benefits for the immediate centre and surrounding community including a:

- more equitable access to shops and services,
- source of employment,
- Strengthening and opportunities for marketing local economies and independent small businesses – in turn more able to compete and respond to demand,
- greater work / life balance through more efficient use of time by being able to shop near where people work and/ or live
- Physical connections with public transport, reducing car use and promoting short pedestrian commutes as associated with Transit Oriented Development (or see transport section)
- Emotional connections through providing ‘fine grain’ opportunities for human interaction and activity such as hairdressers and cafes.

Planning for retail within an activity centre framework generally promotes a hierarchy of traditional and existing high street strip shopping and cautions, if not curtails, further development out of centre/s. Exception to the general activity centre rule are single use, stand alone zones such as existing shopping centre malls, distribution centres and “bulky goods” or big box retail where the physical scale of goods sold requires larger floor plates plus heavy vehicle, loading dock access and car parking, which may better be provided stand alone.

A range of factors including determines the retail mix within a centre:

- Policy directions of governing bodies, the relationships between (such as local and state) and view of the market. For example, in Australia, both NSW and Victoria state government's have defined their policy role in terms of retail as to regulate ‘location and scale’, leaving the market to ‘determine the need for retail and commercial development’ .
- Mechanisms such as determining land use zones, processing development applications and developing overarching floor space ratios of retail to other uses mix;
- The lobbying and influence of private sector such as property developers and major retailers and business groups such as Chambers of Commerce;
- A centre's position within the overarching activity centre policy hierarchy – as metropolitan planning documents use to represent the range of physically large and regionally important down to smaller neighborhood oriented centres. Bigger centres are associated with a diverse retail environment where the offering in smaller centres is more limited
- Competition, health and other laws and regulations such as restricting larger chain and discount department stores in centres already served by independent and local retailers, certain types of retail such as more bottle shops in a community concerned about alcohol-related violence, and other government department regulations such as Health seeking to manage the number of fast to fresh food outlets.

== Commercial development ==
Commercial development can relate to a number of things such as business parks, major office developments, mixed business areas, business centres and warehouse uses. In activity centers and urban locations, commercial buildings often combine multiple functions, such as offices on the upper levels with retailing on ground levels.

The purpose of activity centres, or neo-traditional development such as urban villages or compact cities are to provide a mixed use core, within walking distance for most residents. Employment centres are incorporated into these types of areas, so that residents have the opportunity to both live and work within the centre.

Activity centre policies in most countries provide guidance for local and state agencies as well as the development industry as to the preferred locations for these commercial land uses.

Planning policies support the role of employment in activity centre's and usually aim to concentrate a large area of land use to commercial activity in these centers. These connections provide for the necessary social and economic connections between the region and community, whilst aiming to increase access to employment.

Policies assist in ensuring that these land uses are located within associated transport modes and other urban infrastructure. They also aim to provide guidelines with regards to preferred scale and heights.

Transport considerations have always been an important factor when deciding on locations for commercial land uses, with many businesses giving high priority to locations that provide good access to main roads, arterial roads and rail.

Locating commercial development in activity centres helps to minimise the length and number of trips, especially by motor vehicles and encourage new development in locations that can be served by more energy efficient modes of transport.

The locational demands of businesses are therefore a key input to the preparation of structure plans and activity centre policies.

Local authorities usually maintain strict regulations on the zoning of commercial or business areas and recently there has been a focus on constraining the spread of large commercial developments in the outer suburbs and ensuring that there is a mix of this type of development specifically located within designated activity centres.

Generally in order to implement these aims relating to commercial development, it is necessary to regulate the extent to which commercial development should be permitted outside of these centres.

Most planning systems enable a wide range of commercial development opportunities in order to support local competition and meet the demands for commercial floor space. Locating commercial development in activity centres also helps in stimulating local investment and employment issues.

The planning system should enable a wide range of retail and commercial development opportunities in order to support competition meet demand for commercial floor space and stimulate local investment and employment.

With regards to employment measures, containing commercial development within these places encourages a more even distribution of employment, and guarantees developments are supported by the necessary public transport facilities.

== See also ==
- New Urbanism
- Transit-oriented development

== Sources ==
- Newman, P and Kenworthy, J (1999) Sustainability and cities: overcoming automobile dependence, Washington, D. C.: Island Press ISBN 1-55963-6602

Media release on activity centres—Victorian Government

- Melbourne 2030—Activity centres
- Activity centre—design guidelines
- Western Australian activity centre
- Sydney Metropolitan Strategy
- Peter McNabb & Associates Pty Ltd University of Melbourne Research Team, Activity Centres Review: A study of policy and centres of activity in metropolitan Melbourne and Geelong, June 2001, pp1–76, p
- Various, ‘Shaping cities for health: complexity and the planning of urban environments in the 21st century’, The Lancet Commissions, 2012; 379: 2079–108, Published Online May 30, 2012, pp1–31, p16
- Peter McNabb & Associates Pty Ltd University of Melbourne Research Team, Activity Centres Review: A study of policy and centres of activity in metropolitan Melbourne and Geelong, June 2001, pp1–76, p11
- Urbananalyst, 11 April 2009, NSW – "Draft Centres Policy - Planning for Retail and Commercial Development" on exhibition, viewed 17 September 2012, http://www.urbanalyst.com/in-the-news/new-south-wales/16-nsw-qdraft-centres-policy-planning-for-retail-and-commercial-developmentq-on-exhibition.html
- Activity Centre Policy Review, 2001, A study of policy and centres of activity in metropolitan Melbourne and Geelong FINAL REPORT June 2001, Peter McNabb & Associates Pty Ltd
- University of Melbourne Research Team, Ch. 3, pp. 30–34
- Birrell, B, O’Connor, K, Rapson, V & Healy, E, 2005 Melbourne 2030: Planning Rhetoric versus Urban Reality, Concentrating Melbourne The Activity centre strategy, Monash University Publishing epress, Ch. 2
- Department of Planning and Community Development, 2012, Managing Melbourne: Review of Metropolitan Strategic Planning, Strategic Planning and Forecasting Division, Department of Planning and Community Development, Ch. 3, pp. 23–26
- Ebels, Enno 1996: Land-use management in Utrecht: A, B and C locations, in: EA.UE, (ed.), Environmentally Compatible Urban Transport, p. 40-43
- H. Topp & T. Pharaoh, (1994). Car Free Cities. Transportation. 21 (3), 231-247
- Melbourne 2030, 2002, Melbourne 2030 Planning for Sustainable Growth Direction 1: A more compact city Policy 1.3 Locate a substantial proportion of new housing in or close to activity centres and other strategic redevelopment sites that offer good access to services and transport, pp. 57 < http://www.nre.vic.gov.au/melbourne2030online/downloads/2030_parts/direction1.pdf>
- P. McNabb & Associates and University of Melbourne Research Team, (2001), ‘Intersrare and Overseas Experience and Best Practice’ Activities Centres Review- Technical Report 8 Department of Infrastructure, Melbourne.
- Handy, L.S, Regional Versus local accessibility: Neo-Traditional Development and Its Implications for Non-work Travel, (1992) Vol. 18, No 4 pp. 253–267
- https://web.archive.org/web/20120512183602/http://www.communities.gov.uk/documents/planningandbuilding/pdf/1951811.pdf
- http://www.planning.wa.gov.au/dop_pub_pdf/faq_activity_centres.pdf
- https://web.archive.org/web/20120327055938/http://www.planning.wa.gov.au/dop_pub_pdf/Planning_Policy_Activity_Centres_Com_Eco2_web.pdf
- https://web.archive.org/web/20081202185056/http://www.communities.gov.uk/documents/planningandbuilding/pdf/ppg4.pdf
- Activity Centre Policy Review, 2001
- Birrell et al., 2005
- Department of Planning and Community Development, 2012
- Melbourne 2030, 2002
