= Farmland Assessment Act of 1964 =

New Jersey, US statute

The Farmland Assessment Act of 1964 provided for reduced taxes on farmland in New Jersey in an effort to reduce the sale of farmland to developers for housing and commercial space.

== History ==
The effect was to slow development, and farmland loss, but when prices rose for land the farms were still sold for profit. The act was supplemented with the Agriculture Retention and Development Act of 1981 which put permanent deed restrictions on the sale of farm properties. The Farmland Assessment Act continues today allowing tax exemptions for property 5 acres or more in size devoted to farmland or woodland.
