= Missing middle housing =

Lack of medium density housing in North America

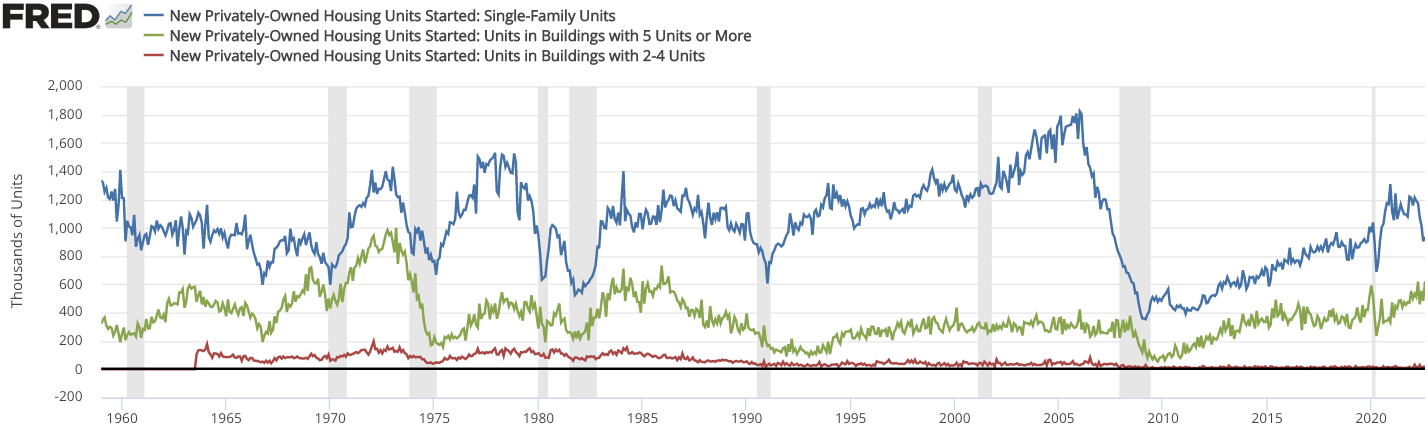
Housing starts in the United States, 1959–2021 Single family home Multifamily residential 2-4 unit residential

Missing middle housing refers to a lack of medium-density housing in the North American context. The term describes an urban planning phenomenon in Canada, the United States, Australia and more recent developments in industrialized and newly industrializing countries due to zoning regulations favoring social and/or racial separation over shared living arrangements, and the prevalence of cars allowing car-dependent suburban sprawl.

Medium-density housing is characterized by a range of multi-family or clustered housing types that are still compatible in scale and heights with single-family or transitional neighborhoods. Multi-family housing facilitates walkable neighborhoods and affordable housing, and provides a response to changing demographics.

Instead of focusing on the number of units in a structure, density can also be increased by building types such as duplexes, rowhouses, and courtyard apartments.

The term "missing middle housing" was coined by architect Daniel Parolek in 2010.

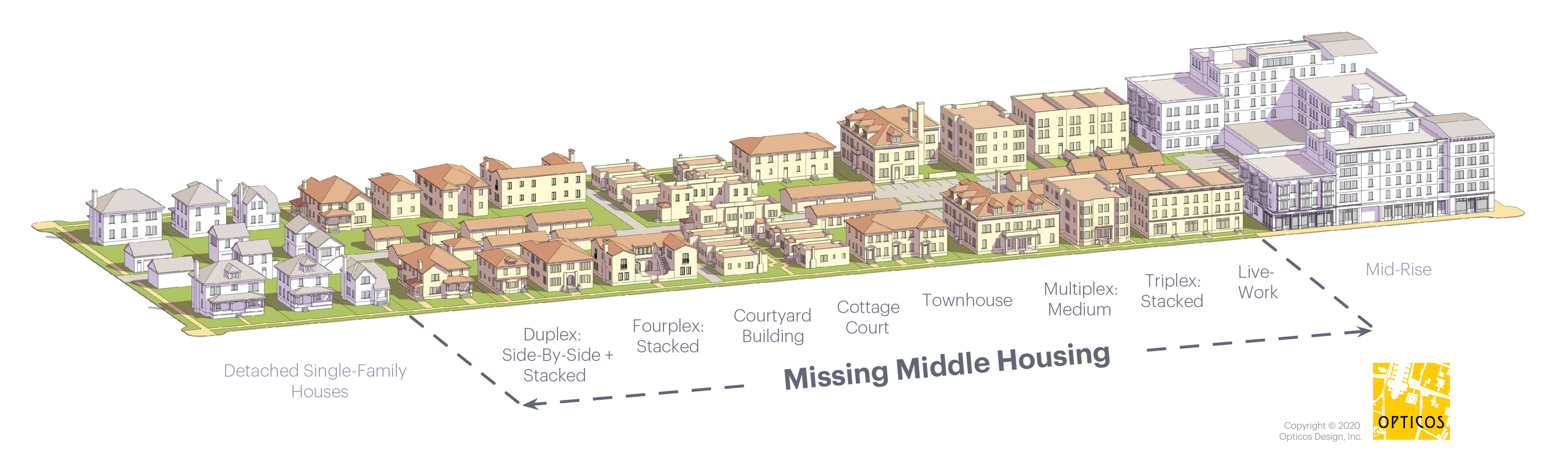
Missing Middle Housing Diagram by Dan Parolek of Opticos Design

Many forms of what is now described as "missing middle" housing were built before the 1940s, including two-flats in Chicago; rowhouses in Brooklyn, Baltimore, Washington, D.C., and Philadelphia; two-family homes or "triple-decker" homes in Boston, Worcester; and bungalow courts in California. Post-WWII, housing in the United States trended significantly toward single-family with zoning making it difficult to build walkable medium-density housing in many areas and, therefore, reducing the supply of the now "missing" middle.

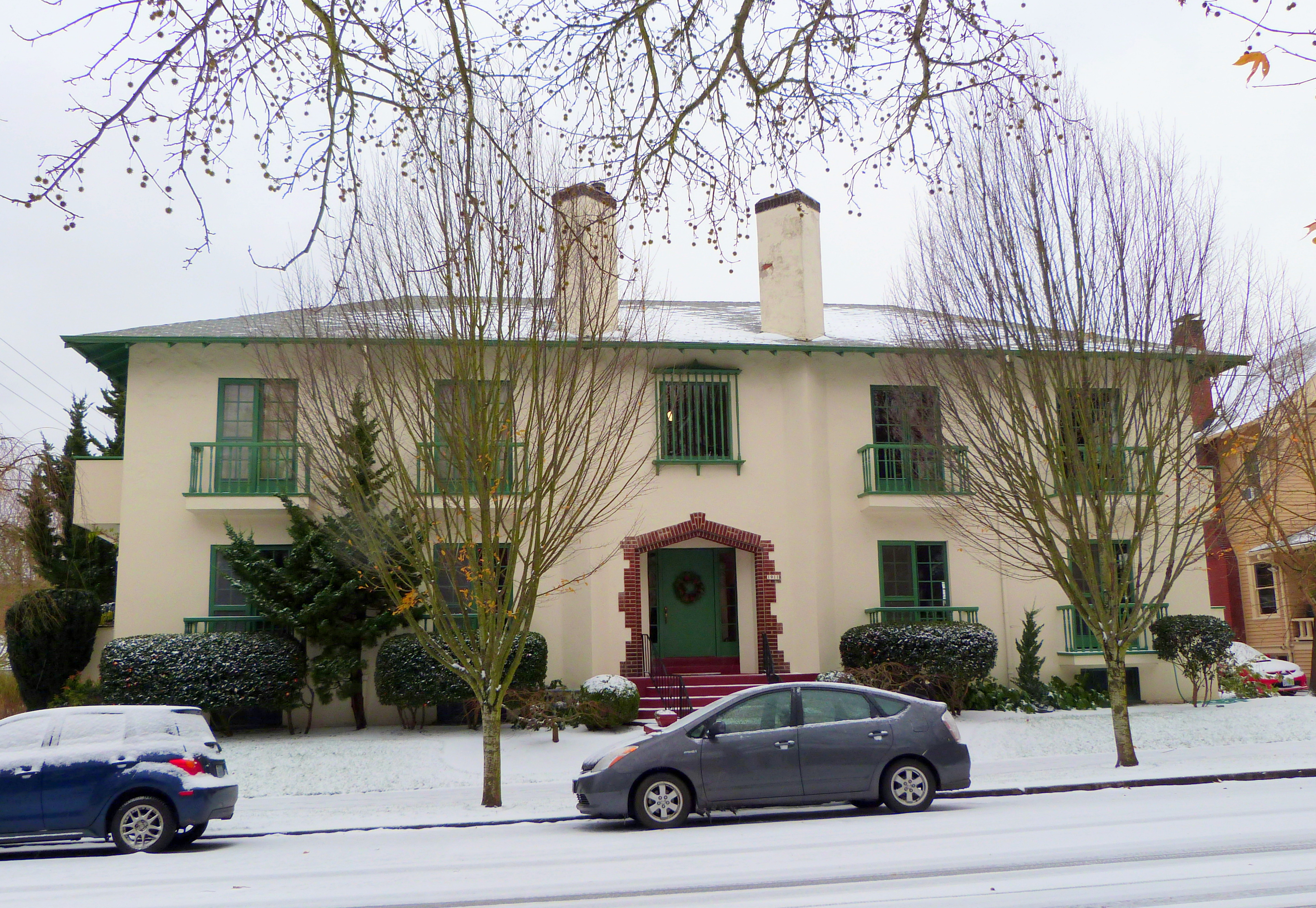
A historic four-plex in Portland, Oregon

== History ==
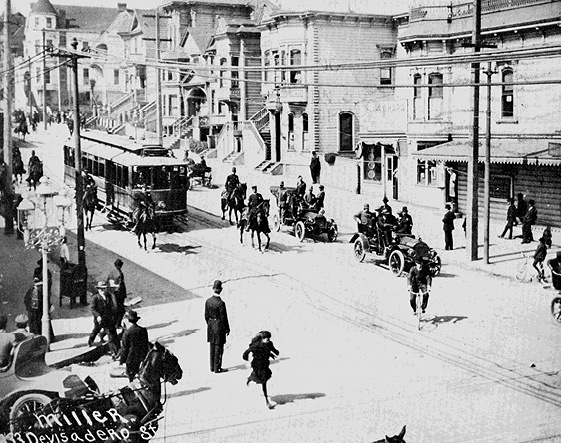
Police escorting a scab-driven streetcar during the San Francisco Streetcar Strike of 1907. A number of streetcar strikes broke out in the United States during the early 20th century.

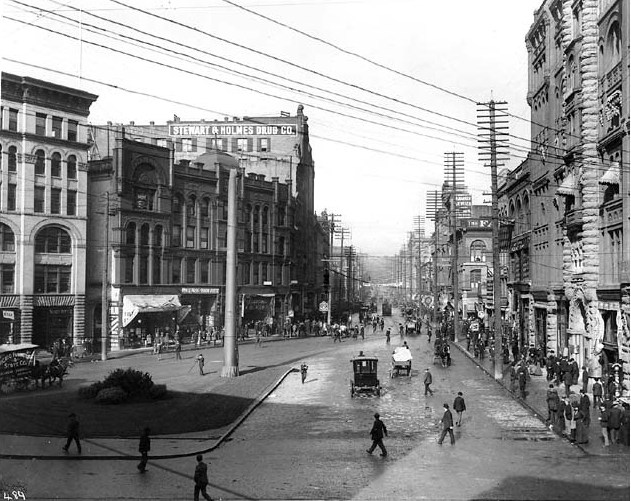
Looking up 1st Ave in Seattle from Pioneer Square, 1900

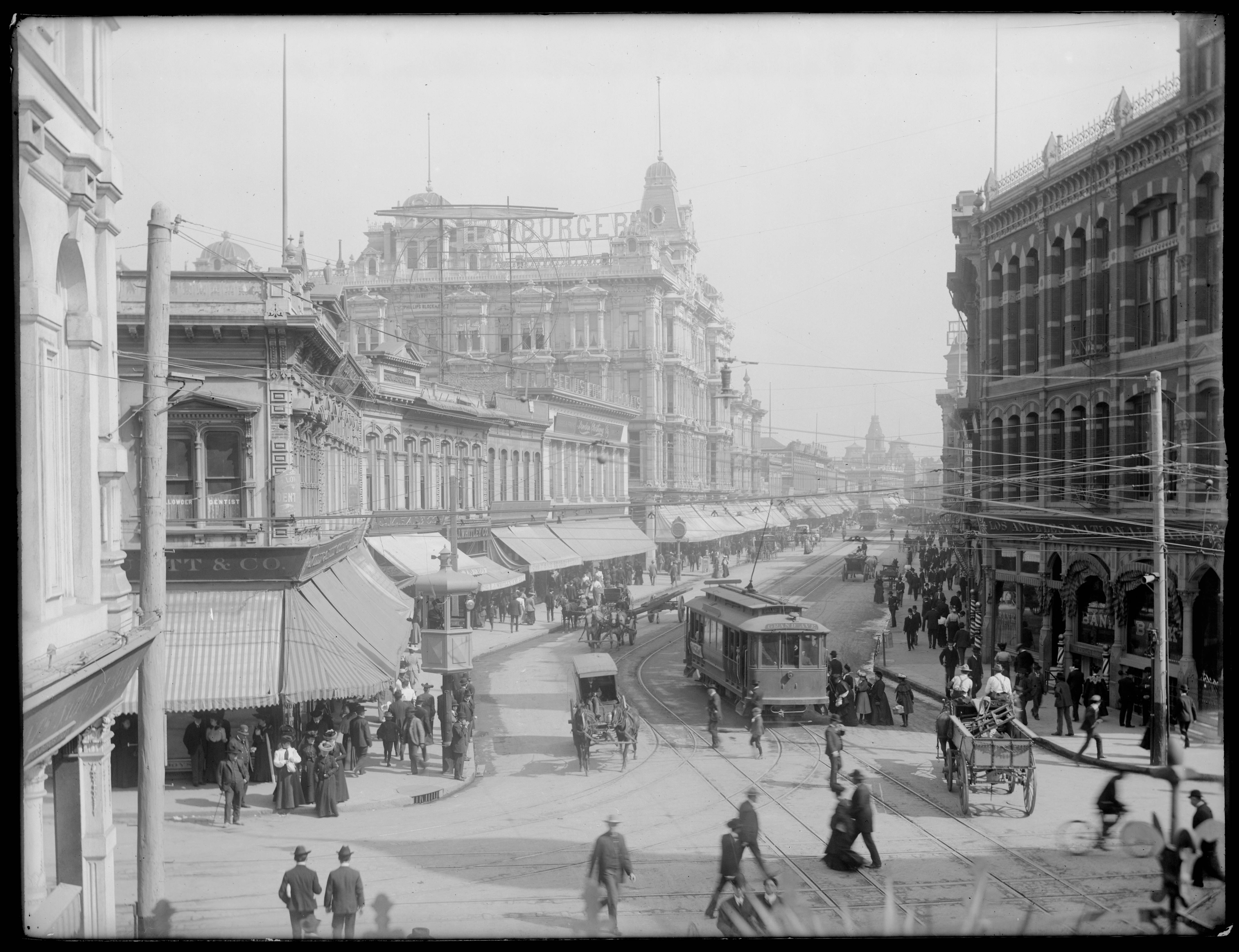
A busy Los Angeles street in the 1890s showing the roads as public space not dominated by one mode of transport

At the end of the 19th and beginning of the 20th century, Canadian and American cities with few exceptions, most notably New York and Chicago which already had many tall buildings, were not dramatically different in form from their European counterparts. They had a relatively small physical footprint compared to their population size, and buildings were largely 3–7 stories tall surrounded by a relatively modest ring of streetcar suburbs. Most city dwellers who were in the lower to middle-income brackets lived in dense urban environments within a practical distance of their workplace.

The less well-off typically lived on either the upper floors of multi-unit residential buildings, as most did not have elevators, or in tenements. Merchants frequently lived in a residential unit above their store. Those who were better-off may have lived in a rowhouse or terrace, and starting toward the end of the 19th century, perhaps in a streetcar suburb still relatively close to the city centre. Overall, the typical arrangement of urban spaces was one where communities were serviced by small-scale owner-operated shops and transport to non-walkable destinations was done by bicycle, bus, streetcar, or train.

Traditionally those in the highest income brackets had typically lived in large houses outside of, but often near to, the city. They travelled to the city originally by horse carriage and later by automobile. For most people, the need to live close to their job significantly limited spatial social stratification beyond economic class. This situation collapsed in the wake of explosive expansion of post-war suburban sprawl, which enabled white flight.

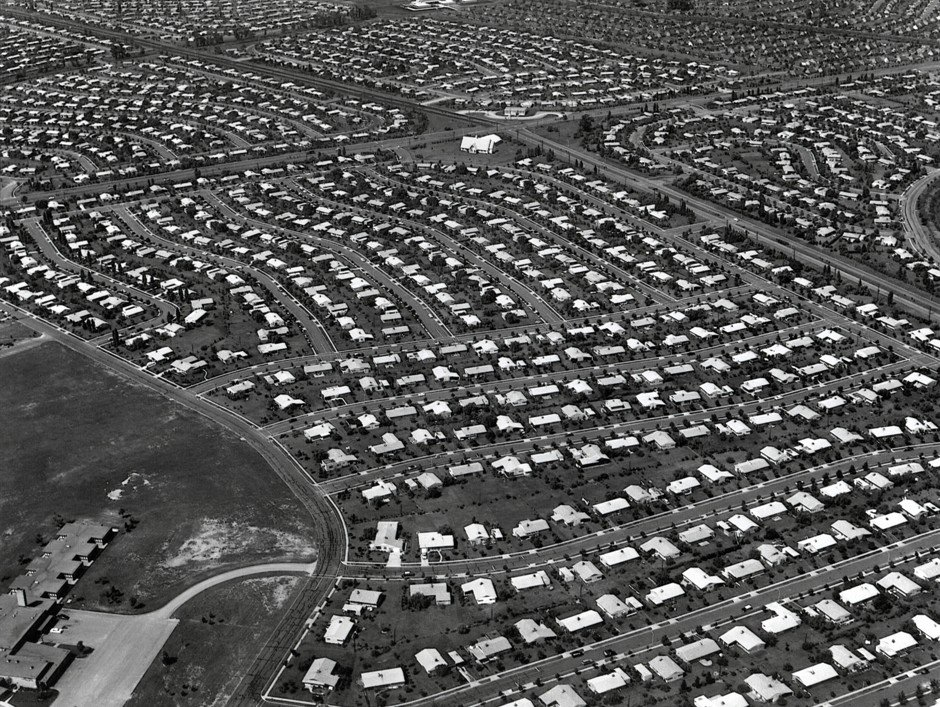
Aerial view of Levittown, Pennsylvania, c. 1959

The early to mid-twentieth century implementation of the suburb was thoroughly informed by this social context, and it was not uncommon for policymakers to inappropriately conflate small residential unit size, poverty, and crime with the traditional urban form; while simultaneously idealizing "rural" and upper class style estate living as its cure-all. The new car suburb was an affordable imitation of upper-class housing which became possible at such a vast scale when, after the war, factories could be turned over from producing military vehicles to consumer cars, helping to reduce the nominal price of a private automobile.

Originally in the US, the legal rule was that "all persons have an equal right in the highway, and that in exercising the right each shall take due care not to injure other users of the way". Pro-automobile interests advocated for the removal of non-drivers from the road, and particularly targeted pedestrians with the invention and criminalization of "jaywalking". Importantly Federal, State, and Provincial governments undertook massive highway building programmes and also directly subsidized the purchasing of new suburban homes (Levittown being the prototype).

These government policies helped to make cars a practical choice and fostered the wholesale adoption of the car by the middle classes by the 1960s and helped to create the conditions for a decline in the quality, availability, and financial viability of public transportation. Increasingly the prestige and influence of New York and Chicago, with their high land prices and abundant skyscrapers, fostered a sense among many Canadian and Americans that "real cities" have tall buildings, and a "downtown" dominated by them, meanwhile European cities remained relatively medium-rise, dense, and pluricentric.

With this in mind, it is possible to understand the factors considered most important by policy makers in the mid-twentieth century context and how they pursued policies which would no longer allow for the previously dominant medium-density building types. The resulting policies radically reformed cities into ones that typically have a unicentric urban core which is dominated by tall buildings built to be reliant on office uses with the area often referred to as the central business district (CBD). This new "urban core" of stacked office uses is typically surrounded by swathes of sub-urban and peri-urban landscapes dominated by single-family homes with gardens serviced by the private automobile, car-centric retail destinations, and vast highway networks.

== Impacts ==
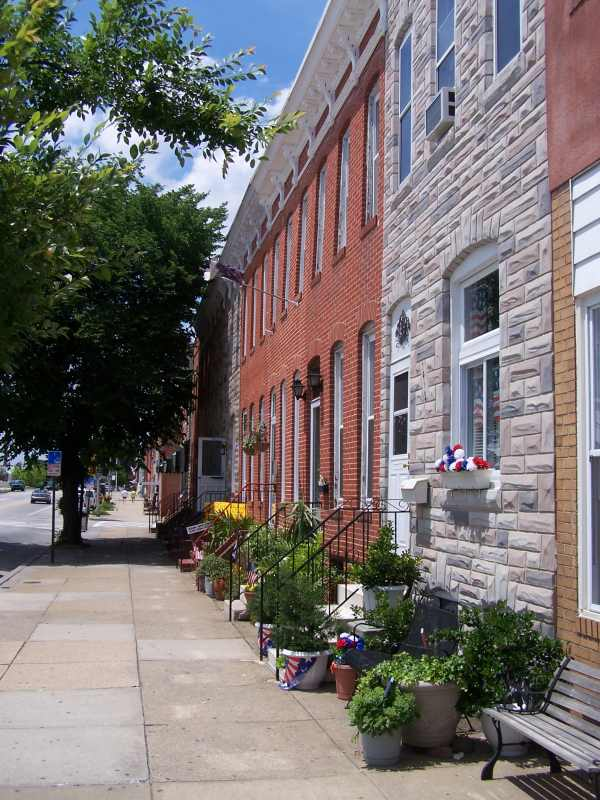
An example of historic row houses in Baltimore with characteristics of medium-density housing

=== Longer commuting patterns ===
The loss of flexible middle-density development serviced by affordable and widely used public transportation has resulted in high commute times for commuters, which have remained stubbornly unaffected by further investment in new road capacity due to the nature of induced demand, a practical limit on the space required to move large volumes of people in relatively large vehicles, and greatly increased costs for both the vehicle owner and government due to the inherent inefficiency compared to previous modes of transport. Other problems include difficulty for low-income residents to find affordable accommodation within a reasonably affordable and practical commute of their place of employment.

=== Negative environmental impacts ===
Car-centric cities are less climate-friendly due to impacts relating to inefficient use of resources, volume of paved area contributing to flood risk, and potential loss of natural habitats to human development.

=== Loss of small retail ===
Without middle-density development to support them, cities have lost retailers not operating with substantial economies of scale. "Mom and pop shops" are replaced by big-box stores.

=== Loss of third spaces ===
Cities without middle density have also seen the loss of third places, places where people spend time which is neither their private residence nor their place of work. These places are important for recreation, meeting neighbours, for adults to make friends, and for community organization. The loss of these third places and small businesses is due to the need of both to rely on proximity to a large number of people for whom visiting them is easy, can be spontaneous, and would not require a special trip. Some have characterized the replacement of these "third places", where historically people of all backgrounds in the neighbourhood gathered organically, by relatively fewer spaces where people must choose to drive, as a source of social filtering and potential source of social alienation.

Some have suggested the loss of genuine "third spaces" as a contributing factor to a perceived reduction in a sense of belonging, inter-group social cohesion, and a rise in generalized loneliness.

=== Environmental racism ===
According to the environmental geographer Laura Pulido, the historical processes of suburbanization and urban decentralization have contributed to contemporary environmental racism.

== Causes ==
The polarization of Canadian and American cities into ones dominated by low- and high-density development with little in-between, has been due to implementing strict single-use land-use zoning laws at a municipal level which prioritizes these use types while making new medium-density illegal. This, combined with shifts in transportation planning at all levels, had helped to create a development paradigm which takes the private motor vehicle as its default mode of transportation, and only after that, considering other modes like walking, cycling, buses, streetcars, and subways. Public transport, where it still exists, has typically also built within this paradigm of car dependency. For example, GO Transit rail services in the Greater Toronto Area is one of the few commuter-rail services in either Canada or the United States, but is designed for commuters to drive to parking lots with a train platform where the rail service will take passengers to the CBD in the morning and return them to the parking lot in the afternoon, service has been unidirectional and only operated during rush hour.

== Possible solutions ==
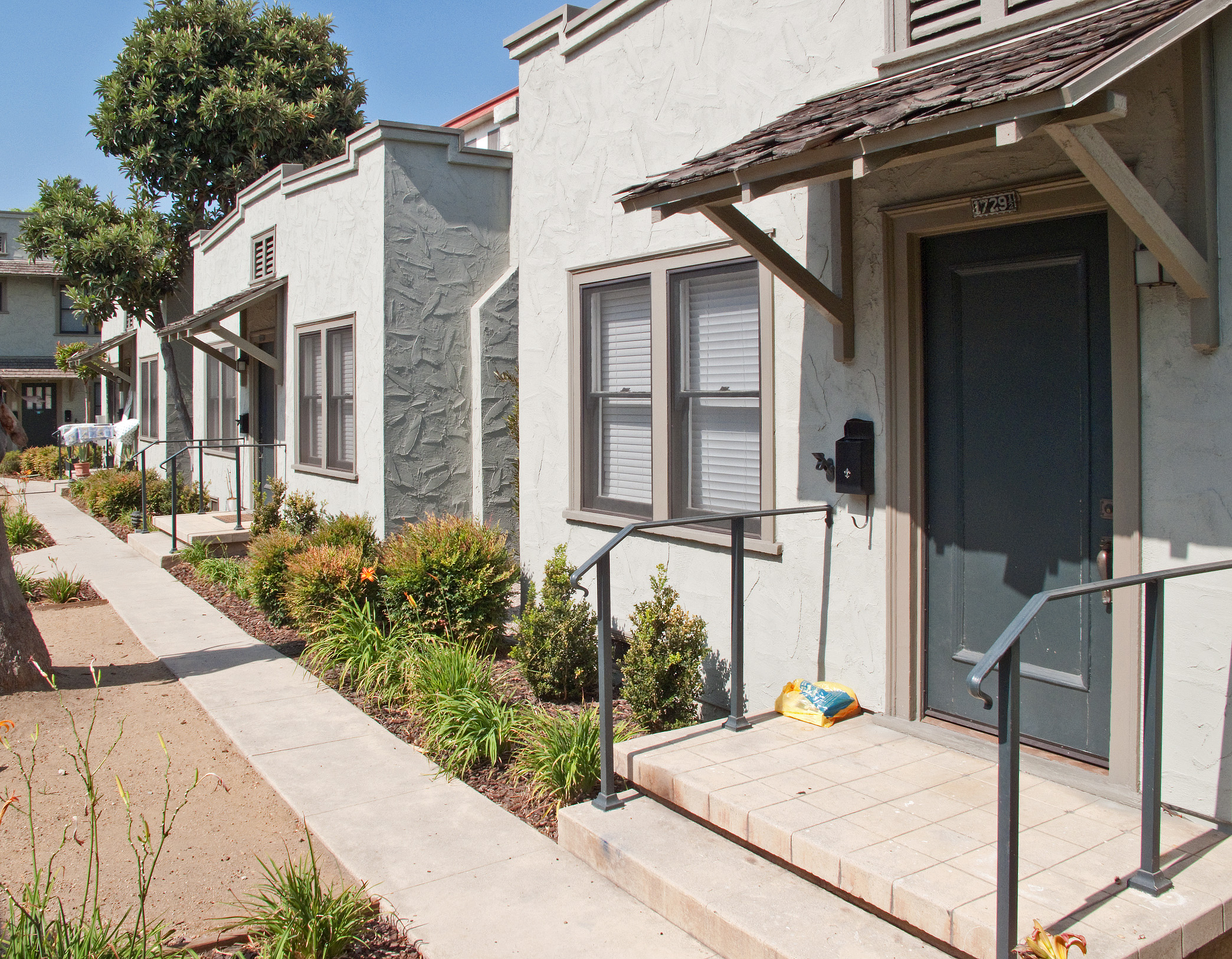
A bungalow court development where several small homes surround a central garden

Missing middle housing offers a greater choice in housing types that still blend into existing single-family neighborhoods, create more affordable housing options, and help reach sustainability goals. Missing middle housing units are usually smaller units than single-family homes because they share a lot with other homes, which results in lower per-unit land costs and, therefore, lower housing costs. Missing middle housing types are also one of the cheapest forms of housing to produce because they are typically low-rise, low parking and wood-frame construction, which avoids expensive concrete podiums. Because the construction and building materials are comparatively less complicated than larger mid- and high-rise structures, a larger pool of small-scale and local home builders can participate in the creation of this form of housing. To support municipal budgets, the denser and more efficient use of land and infrastructure may be financially productive for municipalities with more people paying taxes per acre for less infrastructure than large lot single-family homes.

Increasing missing middle housing options may allow families of different sizes, types, and incomes to access quality housing. Missing middle housing tends to become naturally affordable housing as it ages, and provides a level of density that supports the shops, restaurants, and transit that are associated with walkable neighborhoods. Walkable neighborhoods may then support sustainability, health, and affordability goals by reducing reliance on personal vehicles. This would promote active transportation, reduce sprawl, reduce pollution, and reduce transportation costs by lessening the need for personal vehicles.

Missing middle housing options may allow seniors to downsize without leaving their neighborhood. For example, accessory dwelling units can enable multi-generation households to have privacy while all living on the same property. Missing middle housing may enable a wider range of families to achieve homeownership by offering a wider range of housing options and prices. Additionally, missing middle housing types such as accessory dwelling units can support mortgages through the rents of those secondary units. Overall, missing middle housing options can create housing at a wide range of prices for a range of family types.

Some property rights advocates believe that widely permitting missing middle housing expands property rights by allowing property owners more choice in how to use their property. Some equity advocates feel that permitting more diverse housing choices, such as missing middle housing, may reduce historic and modern inequities that keep less affluent people out of certain amenity-rich neighborhoods.

=== Transit-oriented development (TOD) ===
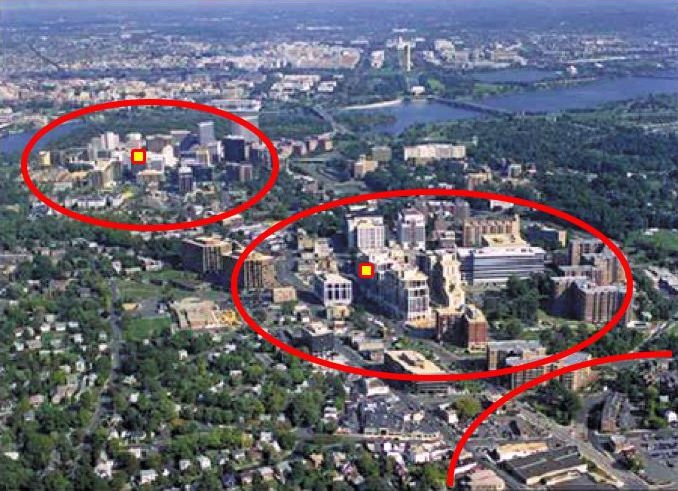
An aerial view of the Rosslyn-Ballston corridor in Arlington, Virginia. The high density, mixed use development is concentrated within ¼–½ mile from the Rosslyn, Court House and Clarendon Washington Metro stations (shown in red), with limited density outside that area.

Increasingly from the 1990s onwards, transit-oriented development (TOD) has been put forward by many urban planners as a way to create more medium-density development. The idea is that creating communities of mixed-use development around public transport nodes will help to recreate demand for public transport and help to re-urbanize Canadian and American municipalities. TOD developments in Canada and the United States are typically near a public transport node, made of large plots with between one and a few buildings on them owned by one to a few owners and, typically, tall buildings and or buildings of intermediate size with a mixture of uses permitted within them predominating. Uses often include shops at the ground floor with residential and office uses interspersed throughout the upper floors.

Some critics of the way the TOD concept has been implemented in Canada and the United States point out that the large TODs fail to engage in placemaking and the result is relatively large highly controlled characterless places not unlike the suburbs and strip malls they are meant to replace. These critics say that the problem is with trying to zone for what planners think a city looks like; rather than creating the transport and legal conditions to allow it to take shape organically.

=== Nested Intensity Zoning ===
However, urban planning in Japan uses a zoning system and has not lost middle-density housing. Instead of single-use zoning, zones are defined by the "most intense" use permitted. Uses of lesser intensity are permitted in zones where higher intensity uses are permitted but higher intensity uses are not allowed in lower intensity zones. This results in nested zoning, where the higher intensity zones are inclusive of related lower intensity ones. Zoning districts in Japan are classified into twelve use zones. Each zone determines a building's shape and permitted uses. A building's shape is controlled by zonal restrictions on allowable building coverage ratios, floor area ratios, height (in absolute terms and in relation to adjacent buildings and roads), and minimum residential unit size. These controls are intended to allow adequate light and ventilation between buildings and on roads, and to ensure a decent quality of housing. In this system, rather than trying to plan for how and where to create dedicated districts of medium-density housing, planners are left to focus on creating the conditions necessary to encourage land owners to intensify the use of their plots, and ensuring new areas of medium density that arise have the amenities they need to be successful.

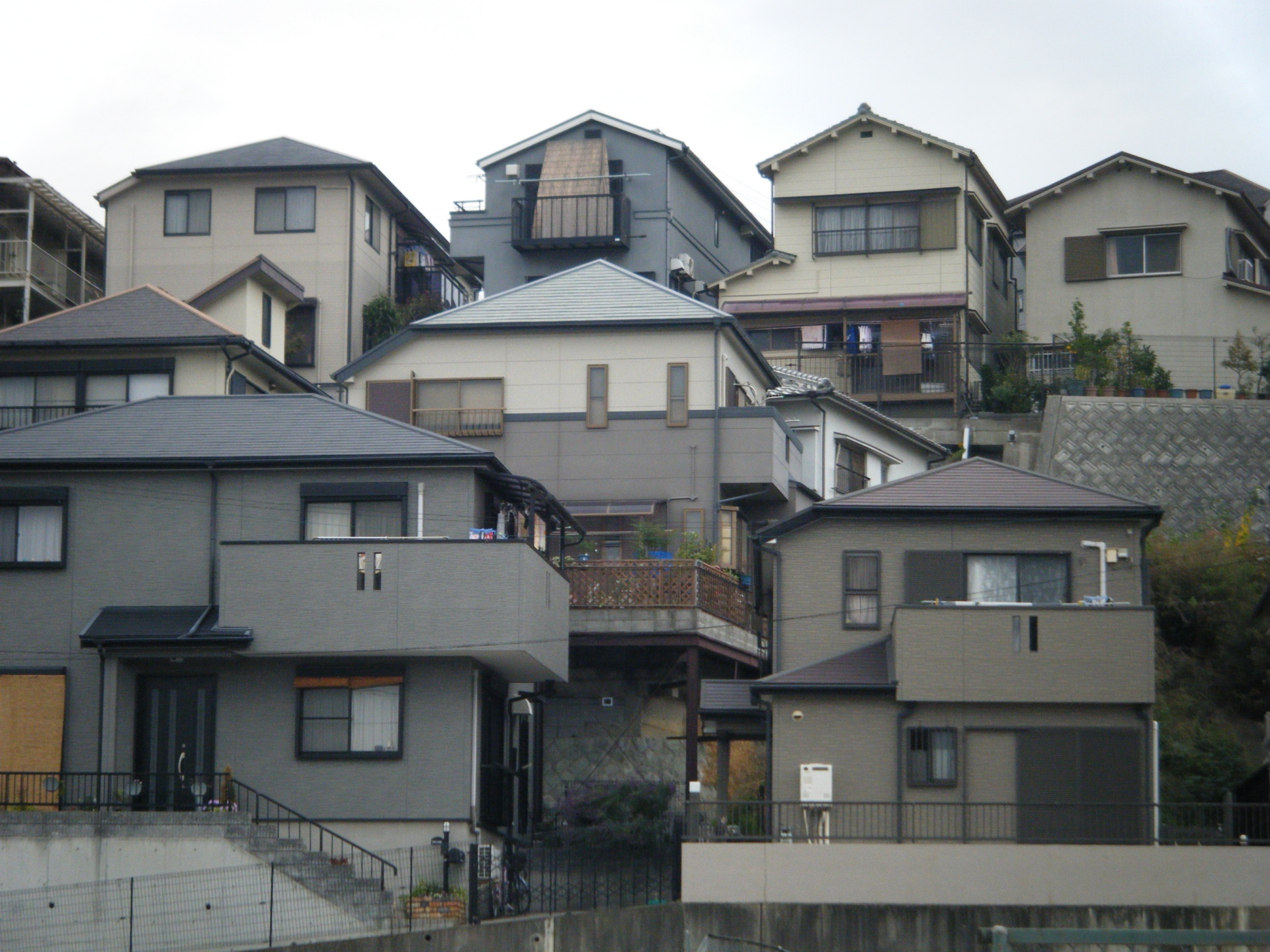
Examples of medium density single detached houses in Japan. Note the absence of cars, car facilities, or private gardens and the use of substantial balconies, strategic window placement, and considerable house size.

When discussing medium-density housing, it is important to explore the differences between the approach this type of zoning uses with respect to single-detached housing compared to that traditionally used in the United States and Canada. In the United States and Canada, single-detached homes typically require large setbacks for off-street car parking and yards/gardens; while single detached homes in Japan are in many cases similarly large single detached houses but on small plots taking up virtually the entirety of the plot fronting directly on to the street with no requirement for off-street car parking; instead assuming a reliance on public transport rather than cars to meet daily needs. Roads in these areas are slow and drivers are aware they must legally share responsibility for mutual safety with all the other types of road users equally.

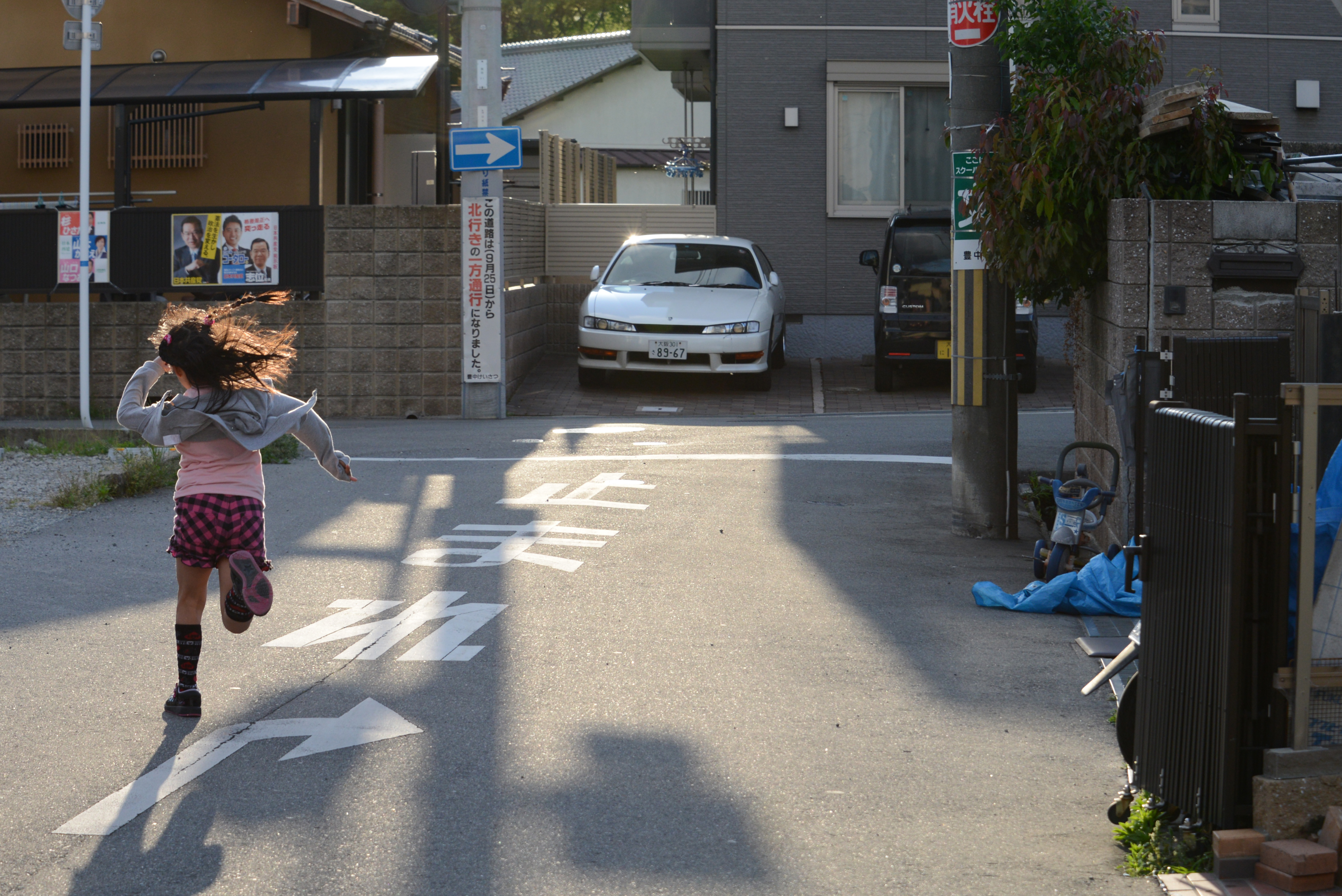
A girl running on a street in Osaka; it is common to see children walking and playing with their friends in the street or taking the metro by themselves unsupervised in Japan.

This type of single detached house can achieve medium housing density while fostering a sense of community, municipal fiscal viability, and good residential amenity. This is achieved while maintaining privacy and access to sunlight by regulating the direction of windows, the use of very small setbacks, much higher maximum building coverage ratios, higher floor area ratios, and other considerations discussed in the previous paragraph. It is also worth noting that Japanese houses offer, on average, larger living spaces than that of many wealthy European countries which have not lost their medium-density housing. This approach to not require car parking provision or private yards/gardens in areas with high degrees of good connectivity is seen as desirable because: access to common outdoor green space is seen as sufficient for these needs or, at the very least, an acceptable tradeoff for the convenience of improved connectivity; the provision of sprawling lower-value land-uses like private car parking and residential garden spaces in such locations is viewed as a poor return on investment by developers eager to maximize living space and plot utilization; urban planners who are eager to avoid the imprudent use of limited public funds with respect to the large nominal and operational costs of public transportation, water, power, roads, etc. which usually increase over distances, while access costs for users do not; and urban planners seeking to avoid wasteful and shortsighted opportunity costs.

This approach to zoning gives the landowner more flexibility in using the land while still precluding harmful or inappropriate development and maintaining the benefit of remaining predictable and easy to understand. The result is that when demand changes, like with new public transport investment, land-owners are able to, on an individual basis, redevelop their land to meet demand in a manner that can be reactive to local demand and distributes risk for the local community; for example the failure of a medium-sized building to find tenants may have a relatively small impact, whereas a large one failing to do so may hamper development of other types in the same community. This type of zoning may also help to foster a more organic and local character to communities, especially over time.

=== Form-based code (FBC) ===
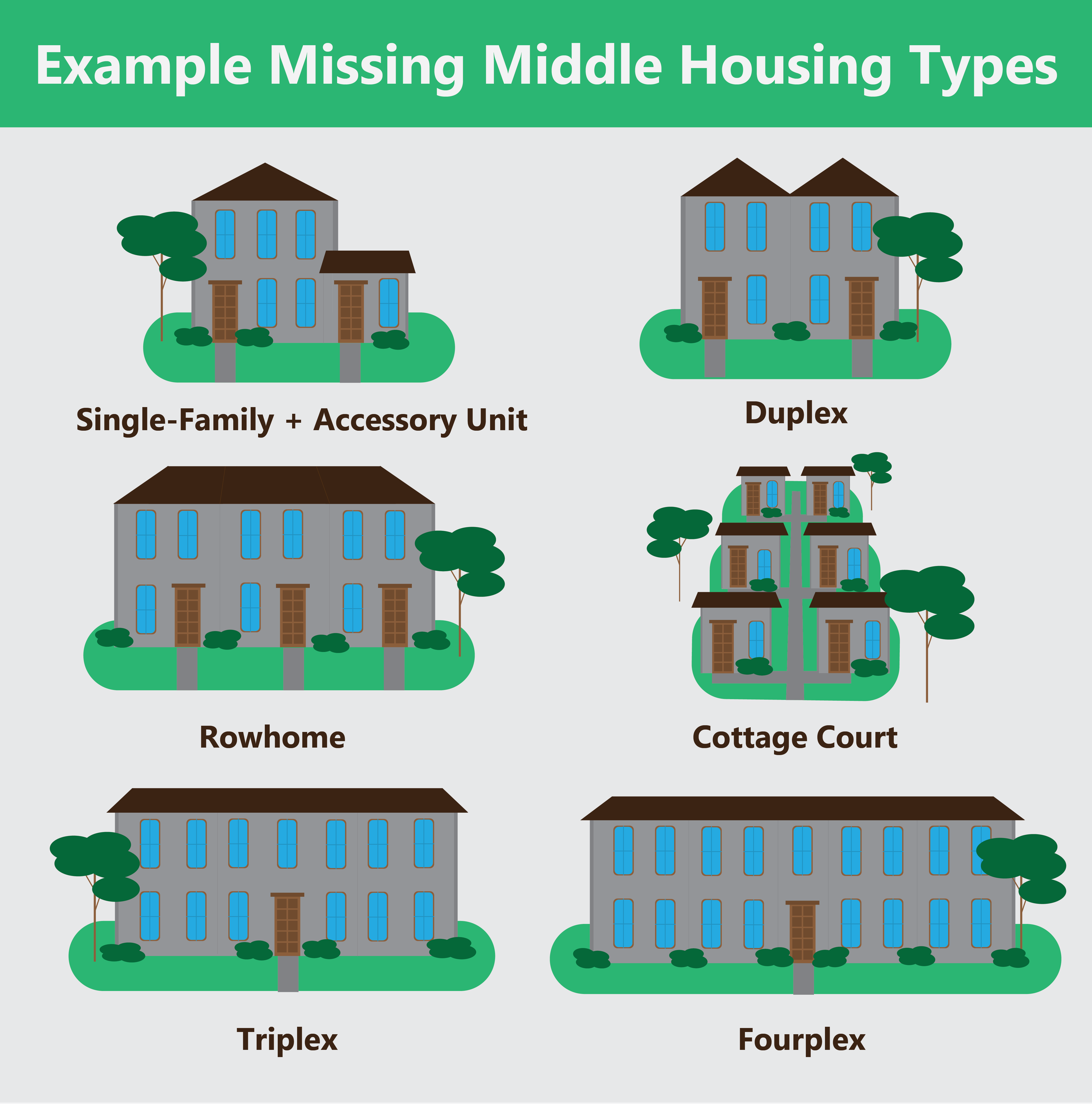
Examples of missing middle housing types

A form-based code (FBC) is a means of regulating land development to achieve a specific urban form. Form-based codes foster predictable built results and a high-quality public realm by using physical form (rather than separation of uses) as the organizing principle, with less focus on land use, through municipal regulations. An FBC is a regulation, not a mere guideline, adopted into city, town, or county law and offers an alternative to conventional zoning regulation.

Missing-middle housing comes in a variety of building types and densities but may be characterized by location in a walkable context, lower perceived density, small building footprints, smaller homes, reasonably low amounts of parking, simple construction, and focus on community. Forms of missing middle housing may include side-by-side duplexes, stacked duplexes, bungalow courts, accessory dwelling units (carriage houses, basement apartments, etc.), fourplexes, multiplexes, townhomes, courtyard apartments, and live/work units.

These building types typically have a residential unit density in the range of 16 to 30 units per acre but are often perceived as being less dense because they are smaller in scale. Because of its scale, missing middle housing may mix into single-family neighborhoods, act as an end-grain of a single-family housing block, act as a transition between higher density housing and single-family housing, or act as a transition from a mixed-use area to a single-family area. The resulting density may support broader community desires, including walkable retail, amenities, public transportation, and increased "feet on the street".

=== Gentle density ===
Gentle density calls for a variety of housing types such as terraces, townhouses, low-rise apartments and dual-occupancy in well-serviced areas that makes use of existing infrastructure and public transport connections.

== Barriers ==
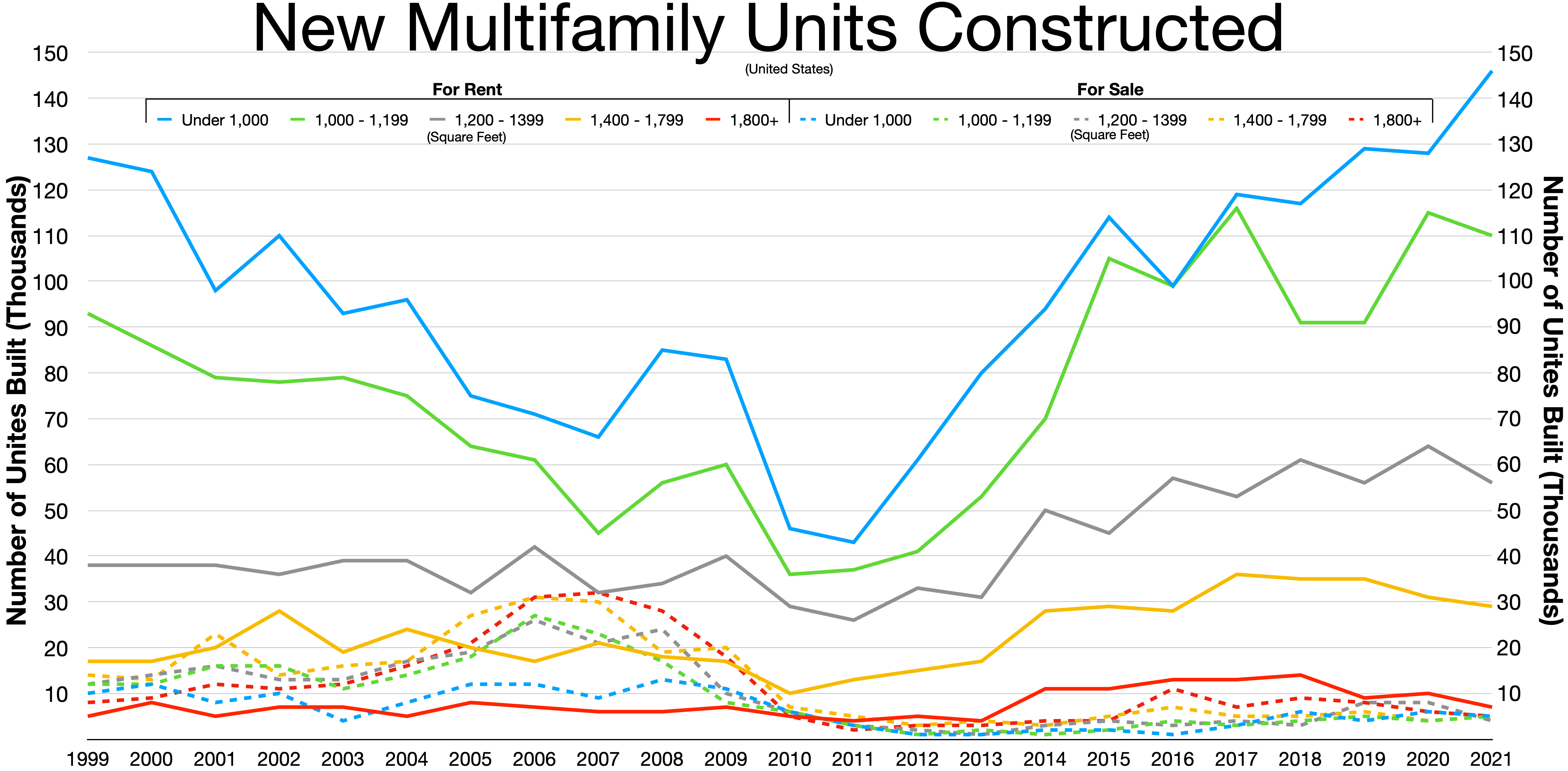
New Multifamily Units Constructed, 1999 to 2021 For Rent: Under 1,000 ft^{2}; 1,000 - 1,199 ft^{2}; 1,200 - 1,399 ft^{2}; 1,400 - 1,799 ft^{2}; 1,800+ ft^{2}; For Sale: Under 1,000 ft^{2}; 1,000 - 1,199 ft^{2}; 1,200 - 1,399 ft^{2}; 1,400 - 1,799 ft^{2}; 1,800+ ft^{2}

Many local governments do not allow the zoning necessary to build MMH. Owning a studio, 1 bedroom, or 2 bedroom condominium that is 600–1,000 ft^{2} in a multi-unit complex with a reasonable HOA monthly fee and a 1.5 detached garage is not allowed in many areas because of zoning ordinances. Many 5-over-1 complexes were built starting in the 2010s but primarily for leasing and not owning.

== Recent developments ==
Since the adoption of the term, missing middle housing has seen a resurgence of interest, resulting in efforts by many state, provincial, and local governments to increase its supply and availability.

At the state and provincial levels, Oregon House Bill 2001, adopted in 2019, requires Oregon’s medium sized cities to allow duplexes on all residential lots previously zoned for single family housing. Larger cities, including those in the Portland metropolitan region, must allow a broader range of housing types, including duplexes, triplexes, fourplexes, cottage clusters, and townhouses. The law also provided funding for planning assistance to implement these changes and allowed cities to adopt reasonable design and infrastructure regulations.

Many jurisdictions followed and passed legislation to enable missing middle housing to varying degrees, ranging from statewide elimination of single-family zoning to more limited reforms in targeted areas, such as near transit. State level legislation includes California Senate Bill 9 (2021), Massachusetts MBTA Communities Act (2021), Maine LD 2003 (2022), Vermont HOME Act (2023), Washington House Bill 1110 (2023), Montana Land Use Planning Act (2023), and Colorado HB24-1313 (2024). In Canada, provincial adoption includes British Columbia Bill 44 (2023), which introduced upzoning requirements, and Ontario's More Homes Built Faster Act (2022–2023).

At the municipal level, notable reforms emerged early in Buffalo New York, Minneapolis Minnesota, and parts of the Pacific Northwest. In 2017, Buffalo adopted the "Green Code" eliminating parking mandates and expanding housing options like missing middle housing in the majority of the city. In 2018, Minneapolis implemented the Minneapolis 2040 Plan, which fully eliminated single-family zoning citywide. Portland adopted its Residential Infill Project in 2020. Other cities, including Sacramento and Berkeley, followed with large-scale reforms. Since these reforms, dozens of other cities across the United States have enacted missing middle housing reforms.

In Canada, Edmonton completed a citywide zoning overhaul in 2023, with similar reforms advancing in Toronto, Vancouver, Victoria, and Calgary. In some cases, local zoning has been preempted or reshaped by state or provincial governments to enable changes. Within Canada Montréal Québec is notable for already having a large stock of missing middle housing with 2016 study showing 78% of Montreal residences are four-unit plexes, often with outdoor staircases, much of which is older in a style unique to Québec, and construction of new missing middle housing continuing to grow. Montreal therefore, serves as an example of a city where this type of housing was not missing, and the City is significantly more affordable than peer Canadian cities.

As adoption has grown, missing middle housing has become a more common concept in urban planning, with widespread recognition across North America. These reform efforts are closely tied to the rise of pro-housing movements, including YIMBY advocacy, as well as efforts to support aging in place and diversify housing options. In some cases, such as in Minneapolis, housing reforms have been associated with slower rent growth and improved housing supply outcomes, though much of the housing growth was larger apartment buildings.

In 2020 the city of Auckland, New Zealand implemented a form of gentle density which changed zoning laws, with an estimation that 80,000 new homes were provided by 2024 due to the policy, which was higher than population growth.

However, not all missing middle housing reforms have been successful in producing more missing middle housing. Many reform proposals have failed to pass, and where reforms have been adopted, they have not always resulted in significant new construction. Home builders have cited additional constraints, including minimum lot sizes, height limits, parking requirements, building codes, and other regulatory barriers, which can limit feasibility. Additionally, projects may face public opposition during local approval processes. Some cities and states are making changes to address these challenges including additional zoning reforms including lot sizes, single-stair reform, parking reform, permitting reform, pre-approved missing middle housing, public review changes, financing tools, and building code reform.

== Examples ==
- 5-over-1, 4-over-1, 3-over-1, 2-over-1.
- Accessory dwelling unit
- Back-to-back duplex
- Bungalow court
- Fourplex
- Reefer container housing units
- Studio condo
- Tiny-homes
- Trailer home
- Triple-decker (triplex)

== Gallery ==
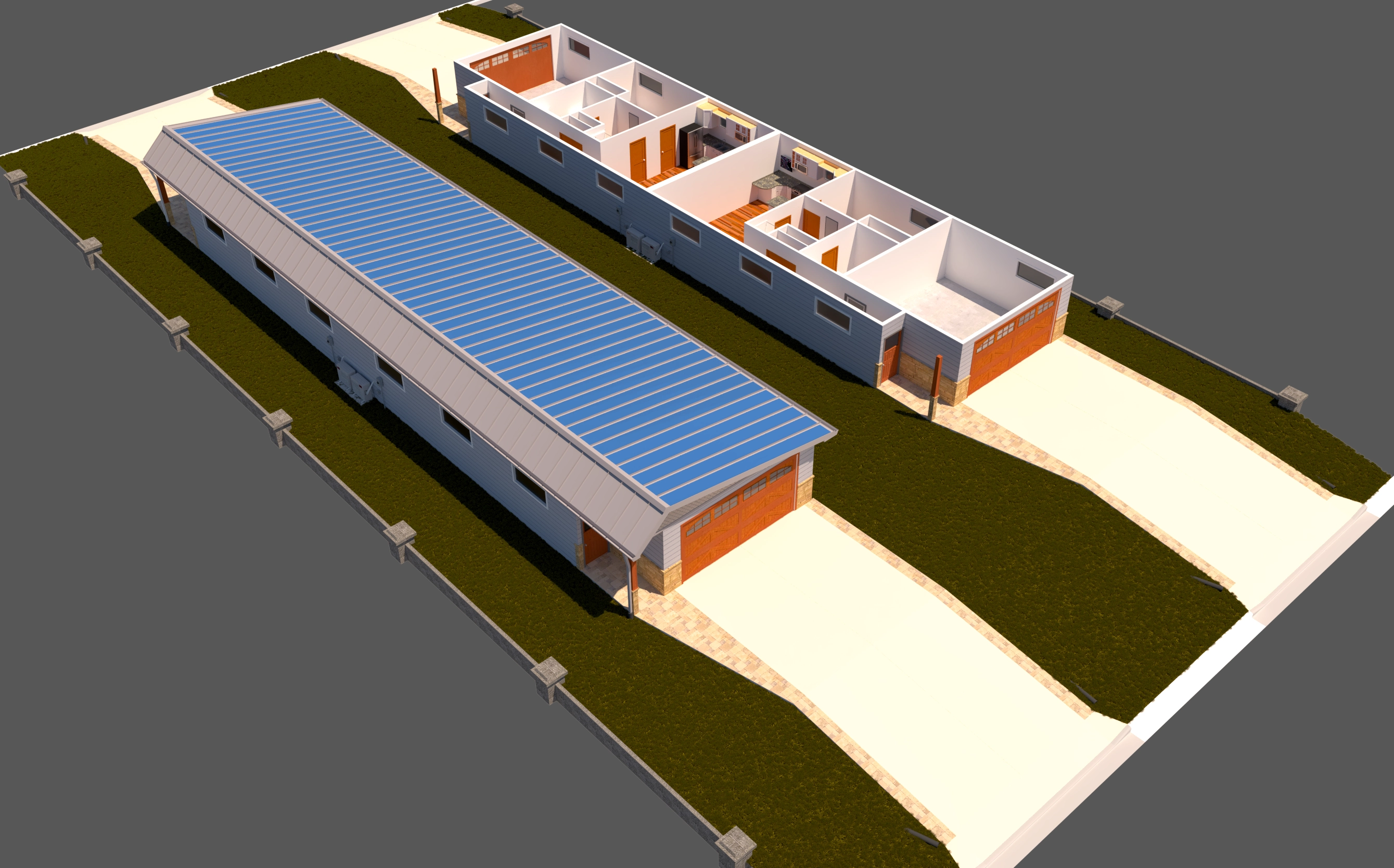
Back-to-back duplexes

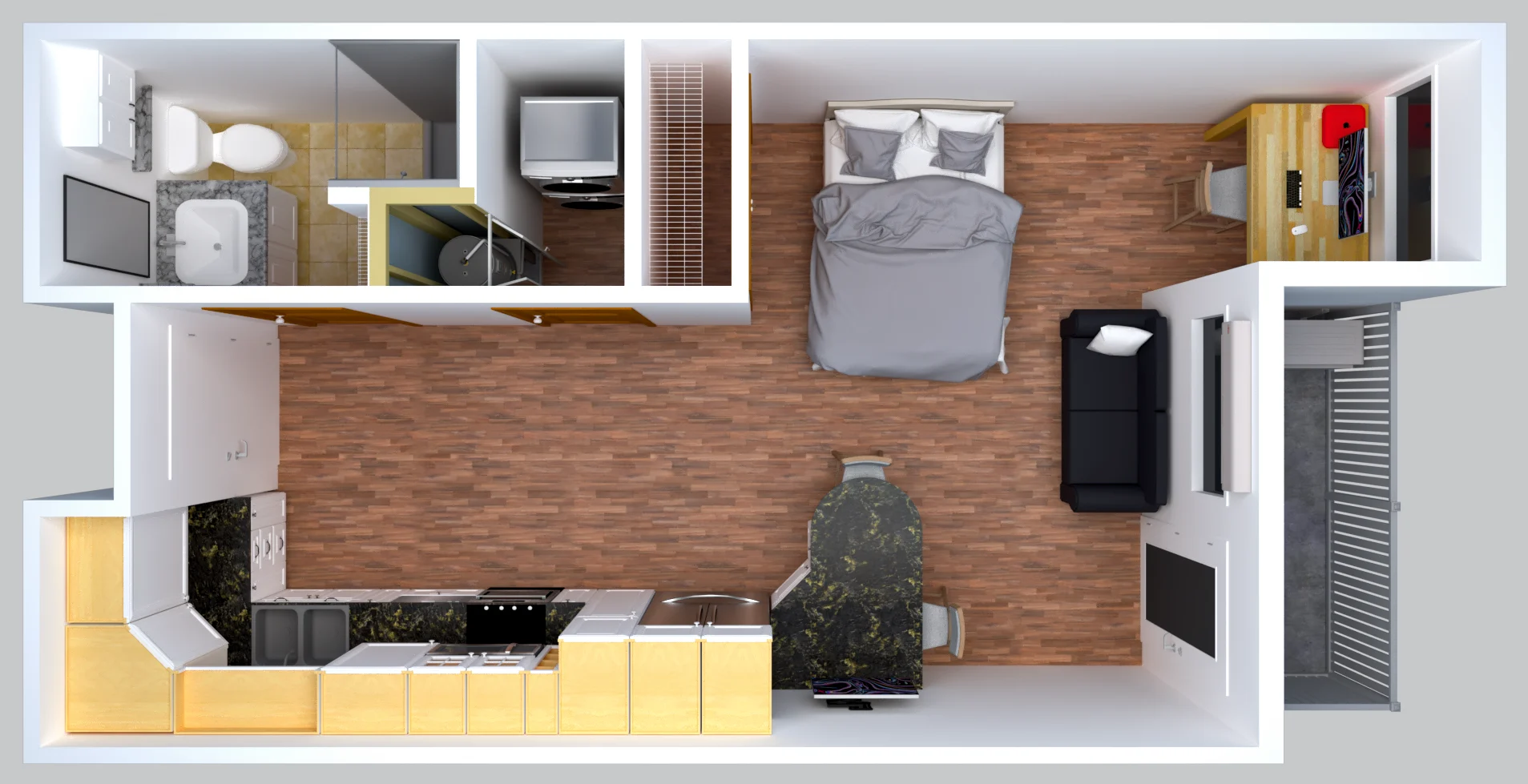
Studio apartment. One main living area with no separate bedroom.

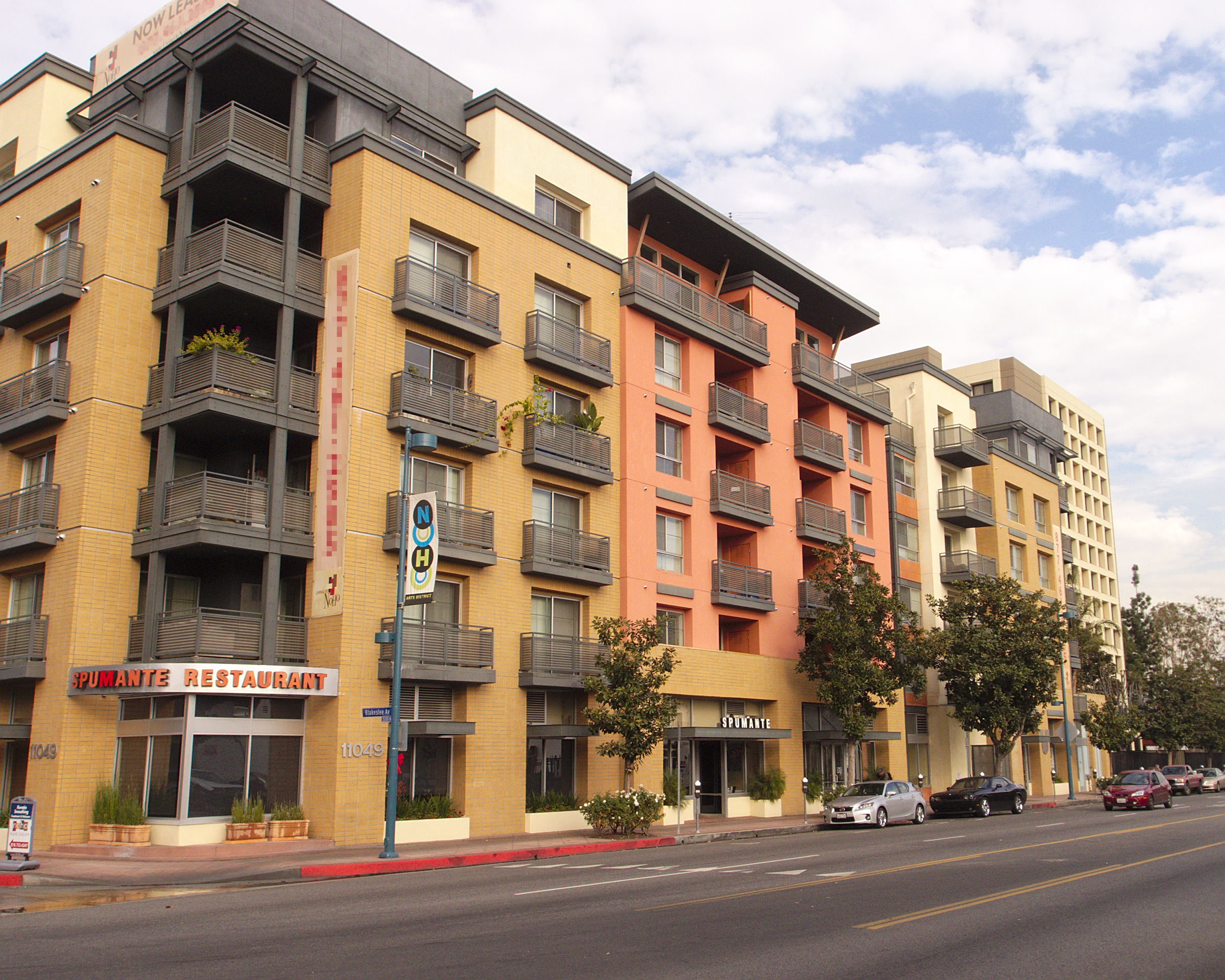
New high-density apartments, North Hollywood

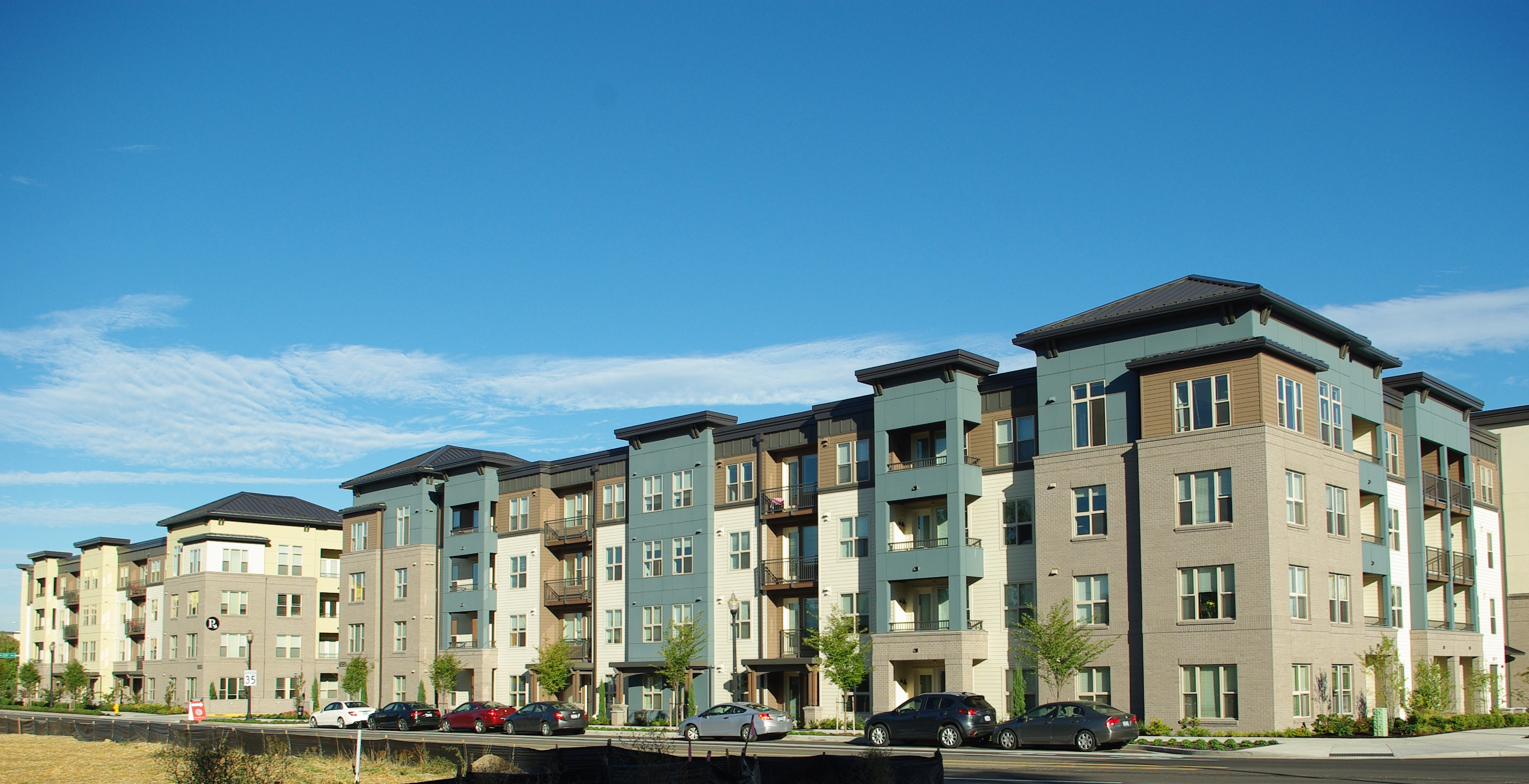
Apartment building in Hillsboro, Oregon

== See also ==
- Affordable housing
- Bicycle-friendly
- Duplex
- Form-based code
- Green building
- New Urbanism
- Starter home
- Streetcar suburb
- Sustainable city
- Traditional neighborhood development
- Urban sprawl
- YIMBY - yes in my back yard
- Zoning codes
