= 5-over-1 =

Type of building

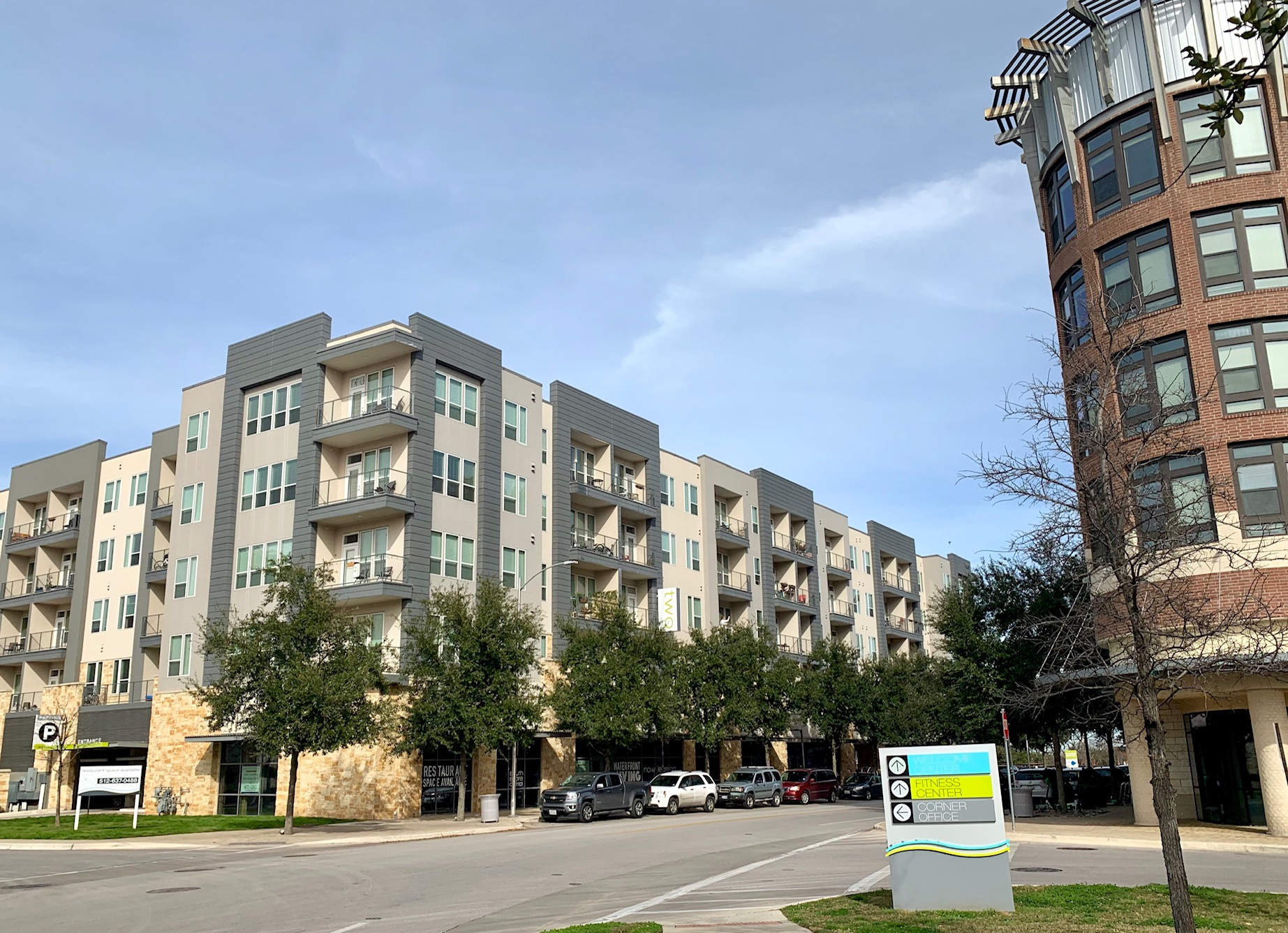
5-over-1 style apartment buildings in Austin, Texas

5-over-1 or over-1s, also known as a one-plus-five or a podium building, is a type of multi-family residential building commonly found in urban areas of North America. The mid-rise buildings are normally constructed with four or five wood-frame stories above a concrete podium, usually for retail or resident amenity space.

The name derives from the maximum permissible five floors of combustible construction (Type III or Type V) over a fire-resistive Type I podium of one floor for "5-over-1" or two floors for "5-over-2", as defined in the United States–based International Building Code (IBC) Section 510.2. Some sources instead attribute the name to the wood framing of the upper construction; the IBC uses "Type V" to refer to non-fireproof structures, including those framed with dimensional lumber.

The style of buildings originated with the work of architect Tim Smith in Los Angeles, who took advantage of a change in construction code allowing the use of fire-retardant treated wood (FRTW) to construct buildings up to five stories. From this he saw that what became the "Five-Over-One" model would bring the construction costs down substantially, making a 100-unit affordable housing project financially viable.

The style gained popularity following revisions in the 2000 IBC edition, and it exploded in popularity in the 2010s, following a 2009 revision to the IBC, which allowed up to five stories of wood-framed construction.

== Description ==
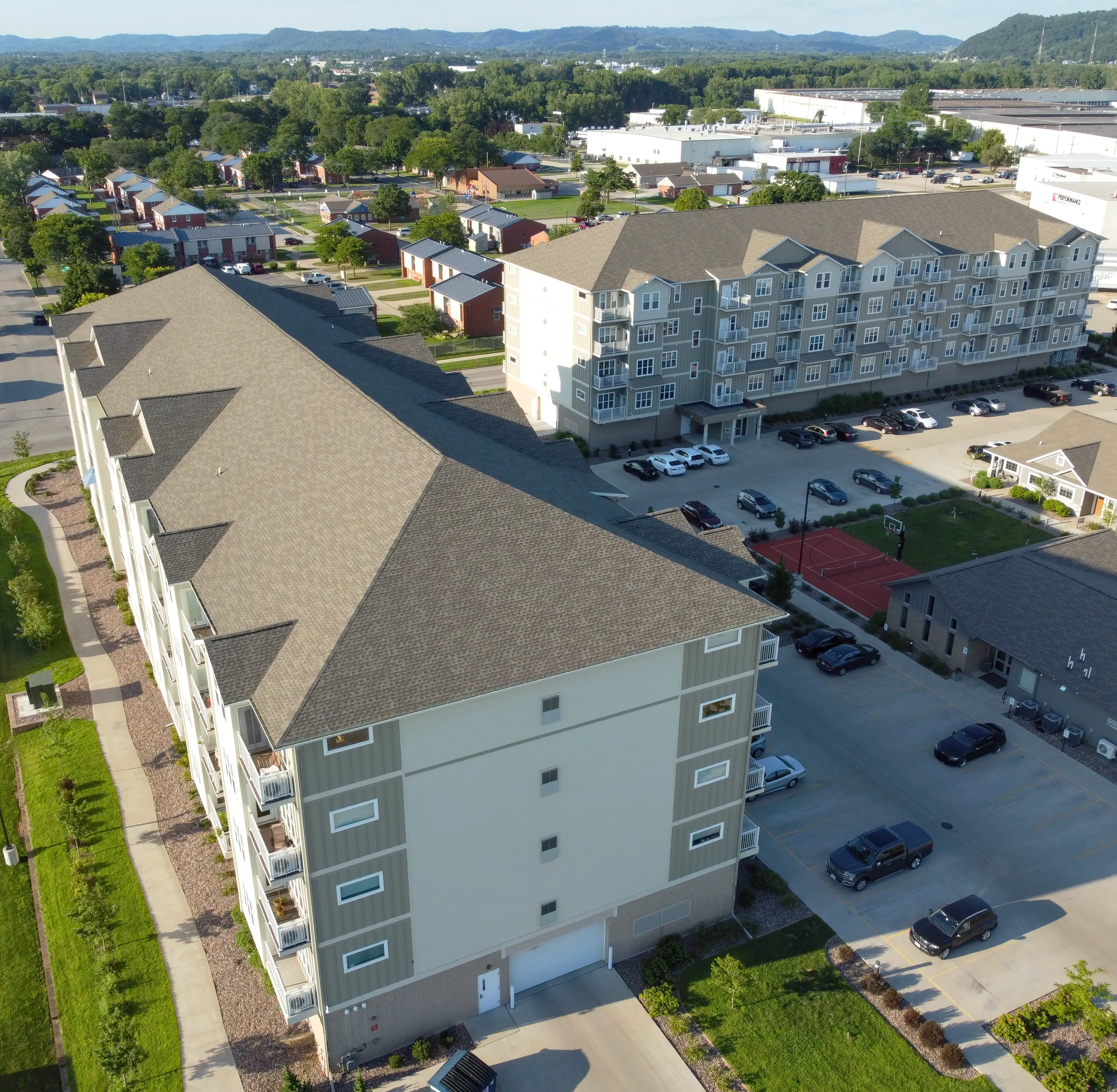
4-over-1

The first recorded example of 5-over-1 construction is an affordable housing apartment building in Los Angeles built in 1996. The wood-framed 5-over-1 style is popular due to its high density and relatively lower construction costs compared to steel and concrete. 5-over-1 buildings often feature secure-access interior hallways with residential units on both sides, which favors a U, E, C, or right-angle building shape. The exteriors of 5-over-1 buildings often contain flat windows, rainscreen cladding, and Hardie board cement fiber panels.

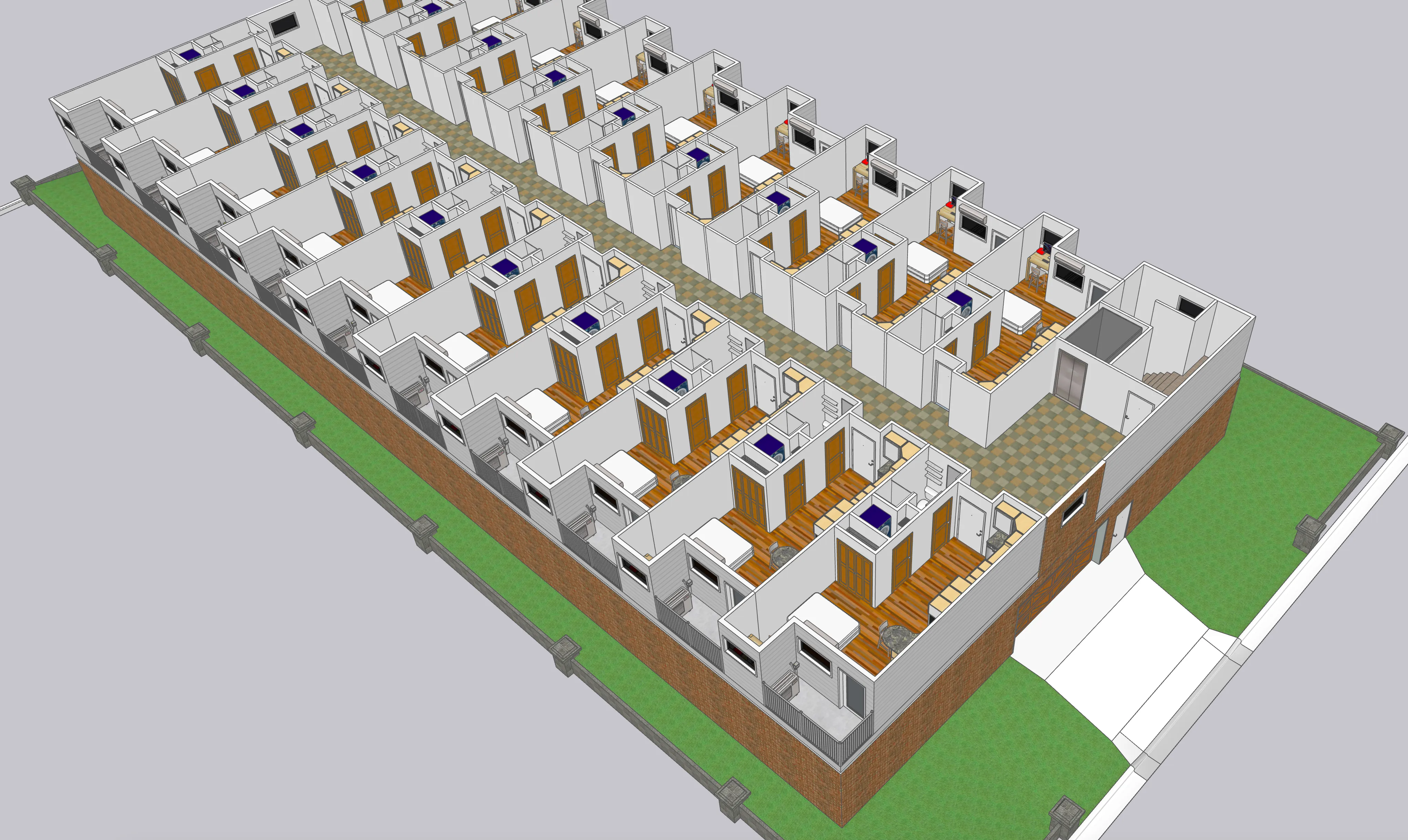
1-over-1 studio condos

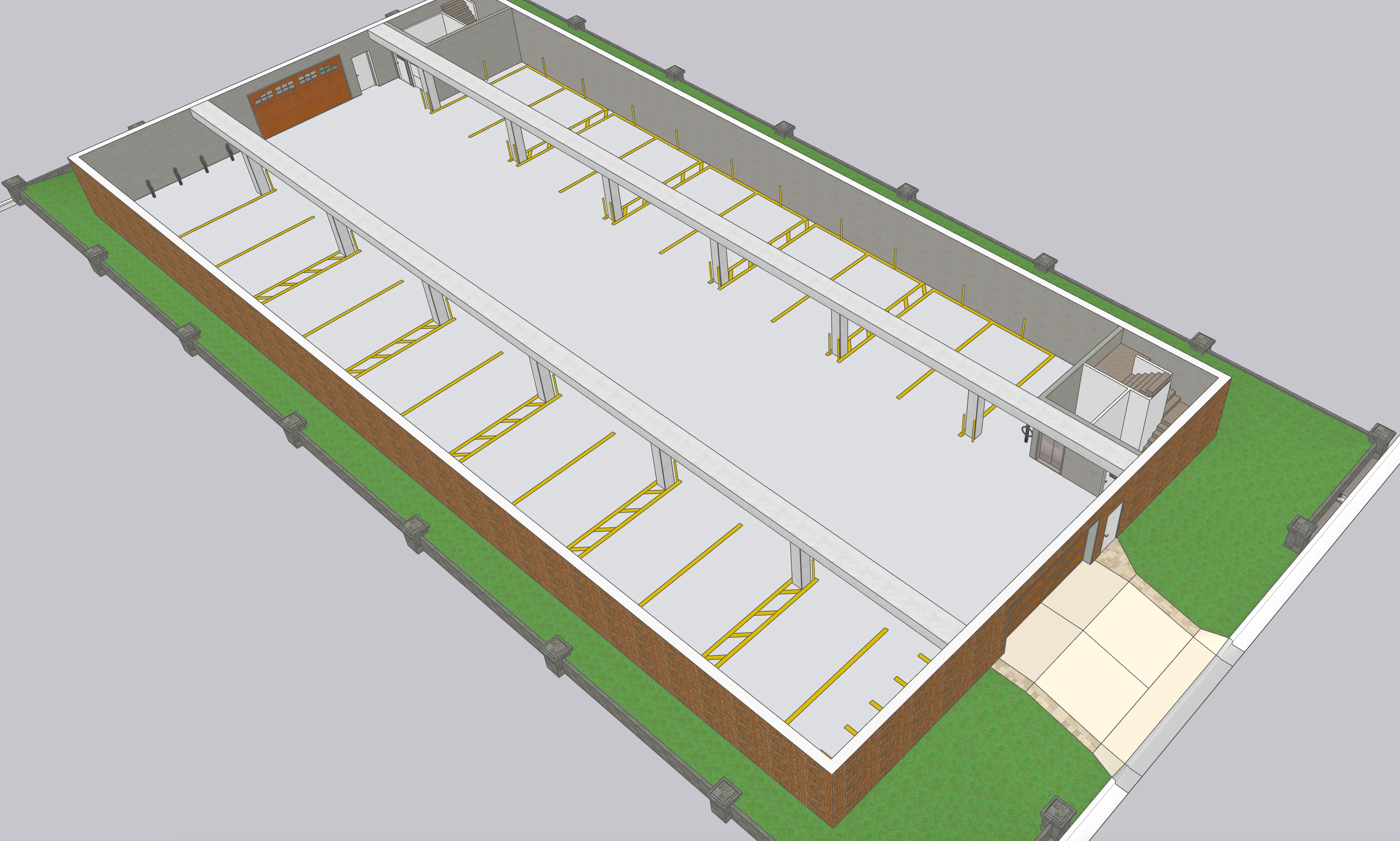
Parking and utilities down below

19 condos and 22 parking spaces below
Heat pump on the balcony

A multifamily 5-over-1 building that is wrapped around a central parking garage is sometimes called a Wrap or Texas Doughnut. This style is common in areas with higher parking mandates.

== Criticism ==
The 5-over-1 style of buildings are often criticized for their high fire risk when under construction, as well as their architectural blandness. Some cities and jurisdictions have considered additional regulations for multi-story wood-framed structures. After an under construction apartment complex burned to the ground in downtown Waltham, Massachusetts, in 2017, the city council voted 14–0 to request that the state reevaluate the building code for 5-over-1 buildings. The borough of Edgewater, New Jersey, introduced a resolution calling on the state of New Jersey to enact stricter fire safety regulations for wood-framed buildings following a large fire that occurred in the wood-framed Avalon at Edgewater apartments in 2015.

The 5-over-1 style of apartment buildings are also associated with gentrification, due to the popularity of the building style in neighborhoods affected by development-induced displacement. However, new housing at market rates (which may include 5-over-1-style buildings) has been shown to loosen the market for lower-quality housing, making it a possible anti-displacement tool.

== See also ==
- Little Boxes ("Ticky tacky")
- Mixed-use development
- Studio apartment
- Three-decker (house)
