= Gentle density =

Housing concept

Construction of new duplexes in suburban neighborhoods is an example of gentle density.

Gentle density is a term used to refer to a proposed solution to housing shortages.

It involves a variety of measures to increase housing stock such as implementing different zoning laws to allow a variety of types of housing. It emphasises the need to build more terraces, townhouses, low-rise apartments and dual-occupancy dwellings.

== Definition ==
"Gentle density" calls for a variety of housing types such as terraces, townhouses, low-rise apartments and dual-occupancy in well-serviced areas that makes use of existing infrastructure and public transport connections.

== Use ==
The Financial Times has stated that Australia, New Zealand and the United States have rapidly embraced the policy. They also reported that United Kingdom prime minister Keir Starmer promised to implement 'gentle urban development' along with 'new Georgian-style town houses in urban areas'. The Financial Times has stated examples of gentle density include developments such as Borneo Isle in Amsterdam and Marmalade Lane in Cambridge.

In the United Kingdom, the Labour government was elected in 2024 on a pledge to implement solutions to the housing crisis. Gentle density refers to solutions that go in between the high-rise of city centres and low-rise suburbs. The UK-based think tank Create Streets is an advocate for gentle density within new developments, publishing research that supports proposals for this sort of development. Chairman of Create Streets Nicholas Boys Smith has championed the principles of gentle density under the 2010–2024 Conservative government, as Chair of the Office for Place and as Co-chair of the Building Better, Building Beautiful Commission alongside Sir Roger Scruton.

The think tank Committee for Economic Development of Australia (CEDA) has proposed a solution where Australian home-building services can utilise gentle density. In Australia, CEDA estimated that gentle density can increase housing stock by approximately 12% more houses in Sydney, 15% more houses in Melbourne, 16% increase in Adelaide and an increase of at least 17% in Perth. The CEDA report emphasises the need to reach a National Housing Accord target of 1.2 million new homes by 2029. CEDA has stated that local councils are the main roadblock to implementing gentle density policies.

Auckland, New Zealand has implemented a form of gentle density which changed zoning laws, with an estimation that 80,000 new homes were provided by 2024 due to the policy, which was higher than population growth.
