= Low-rise building =

Building that is only a few stories tall

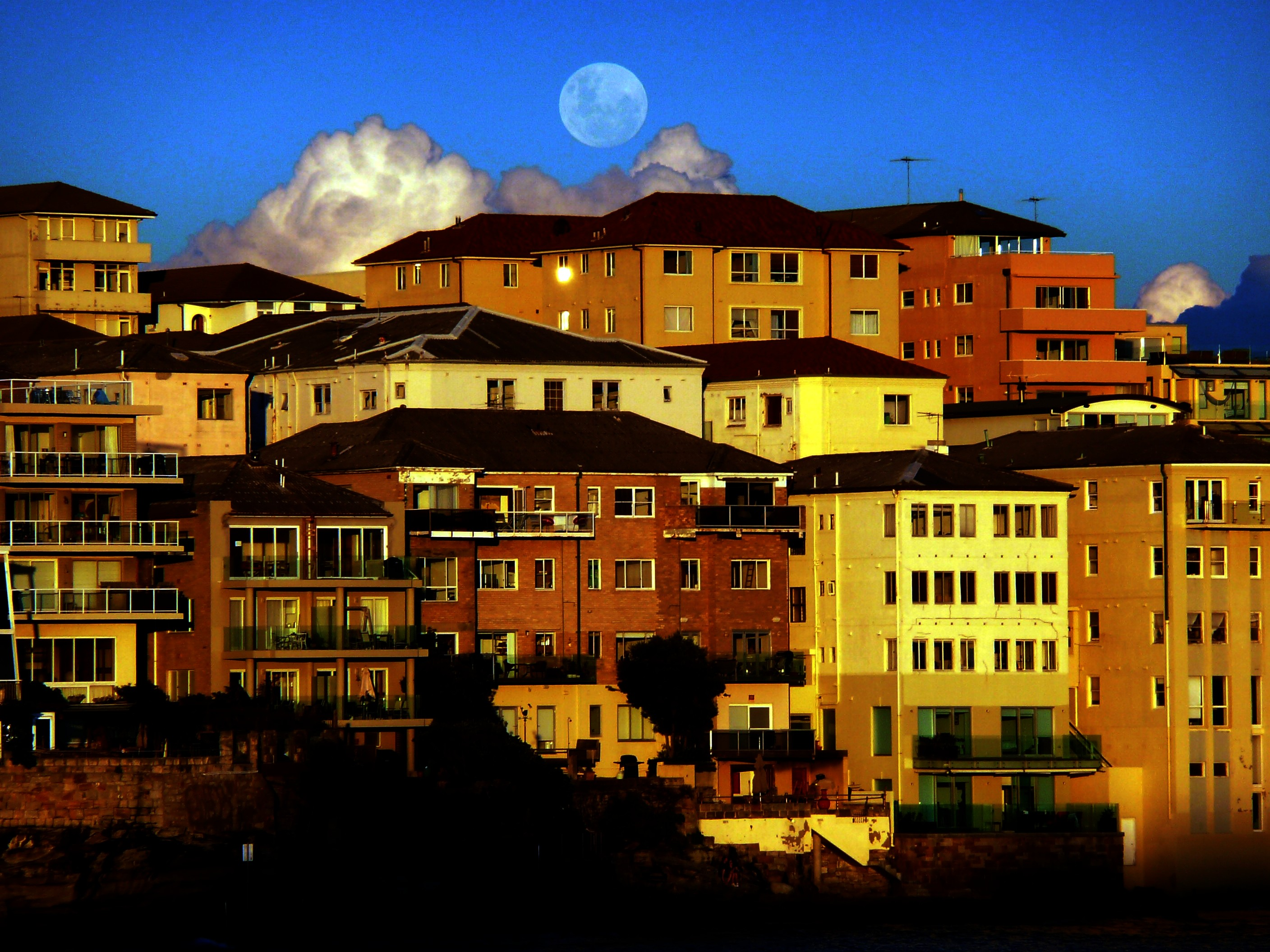
Low-rise apartments in Bondi, Australia

A low-rise is a building that is only a few stories tall, as contrasted with a high-rise. Some classification include the designation mid-rise for buildings that are more than a few stories tall but not especially tall.

== Definition ==
Emporis defines a low-rise as "an enclosed structure below 35 metres [115 feet] which is divided into regular floor levels". The city of Toronto defines a mid-rise as a building between four and twelve stories. They also have elevators and stairs. Shorter structures may only have stairs.

== Characteristics ==
Low-rise apartments sometimes offer more privacy and negotiability of rent and utilities than high-rise apartments, although they may have fewer amenities and less flexibility with leases. It is easier to put fires out in low-rise buildings.

Within the United States, due to the legal-economic and modernist perspectives, low-rises can in some cities be seen as less luxurious than high-rises, whereas within Western Europe (for historical identity and legal reasons) low-rise tends to be more attractive. Some businesses prefer low-rise buildings due to lower costs and more usable space. Having all employees on a single floor may also increase work productivity.

== Gallery ==
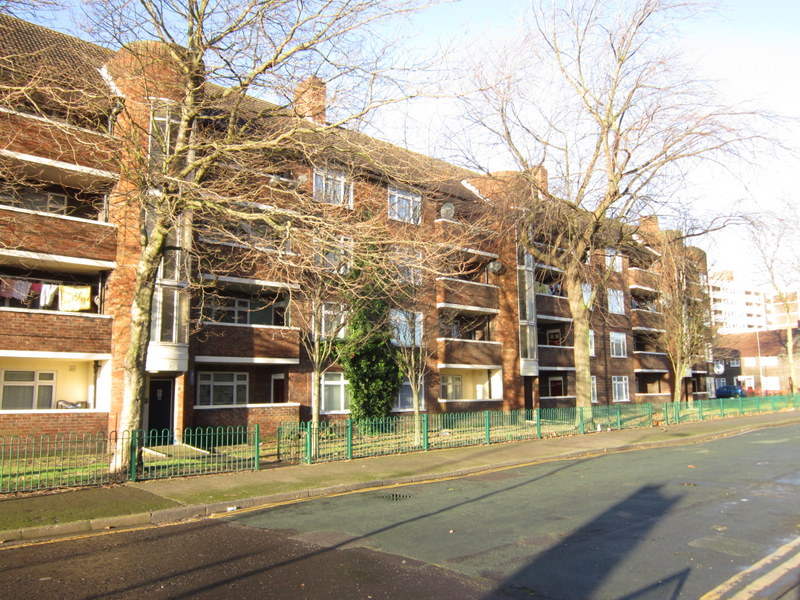
Flats in Kingston upon Hull, Yorkshire, England

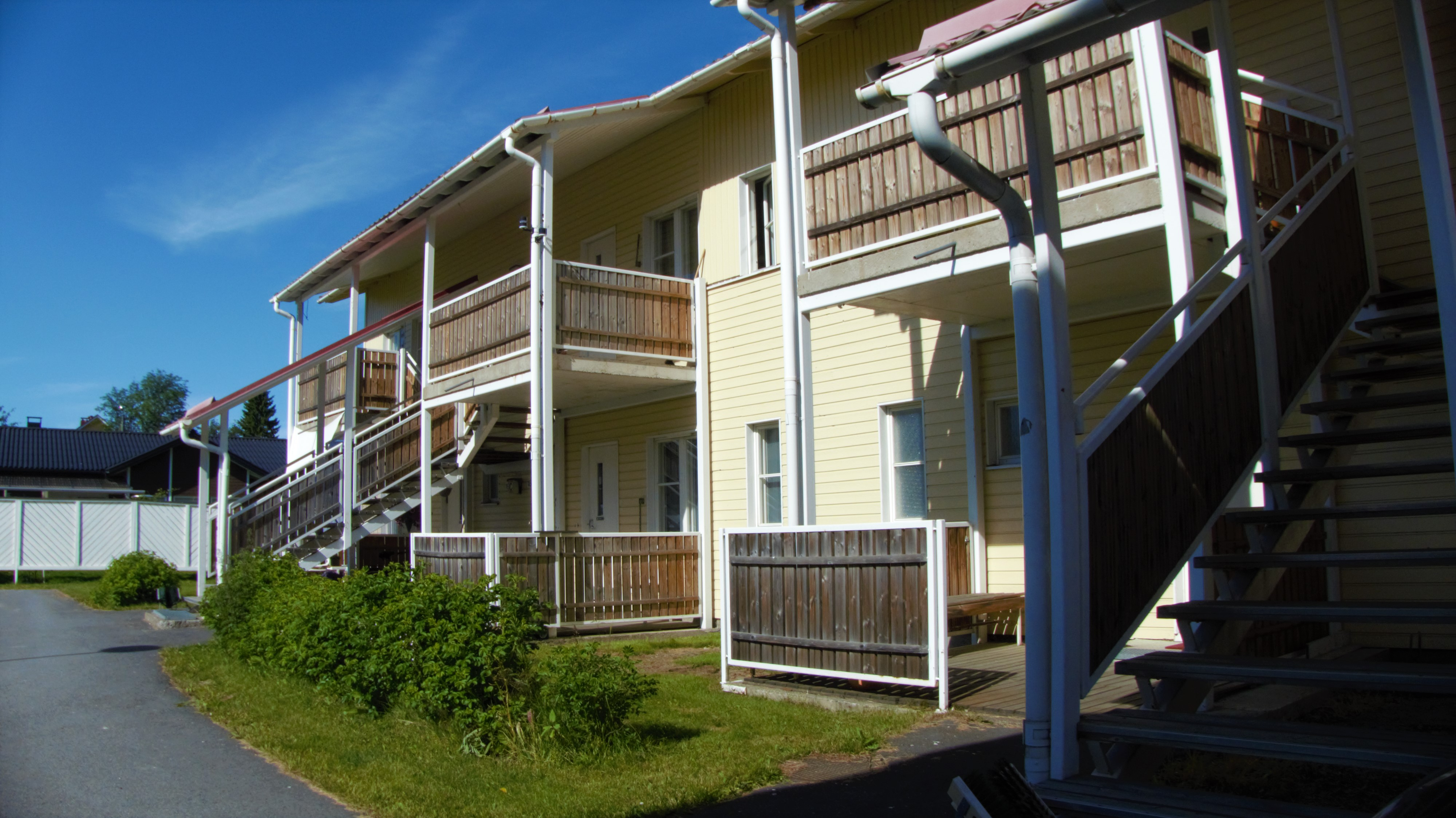
A deck-access apartment houses in Seinäjoki, Finland

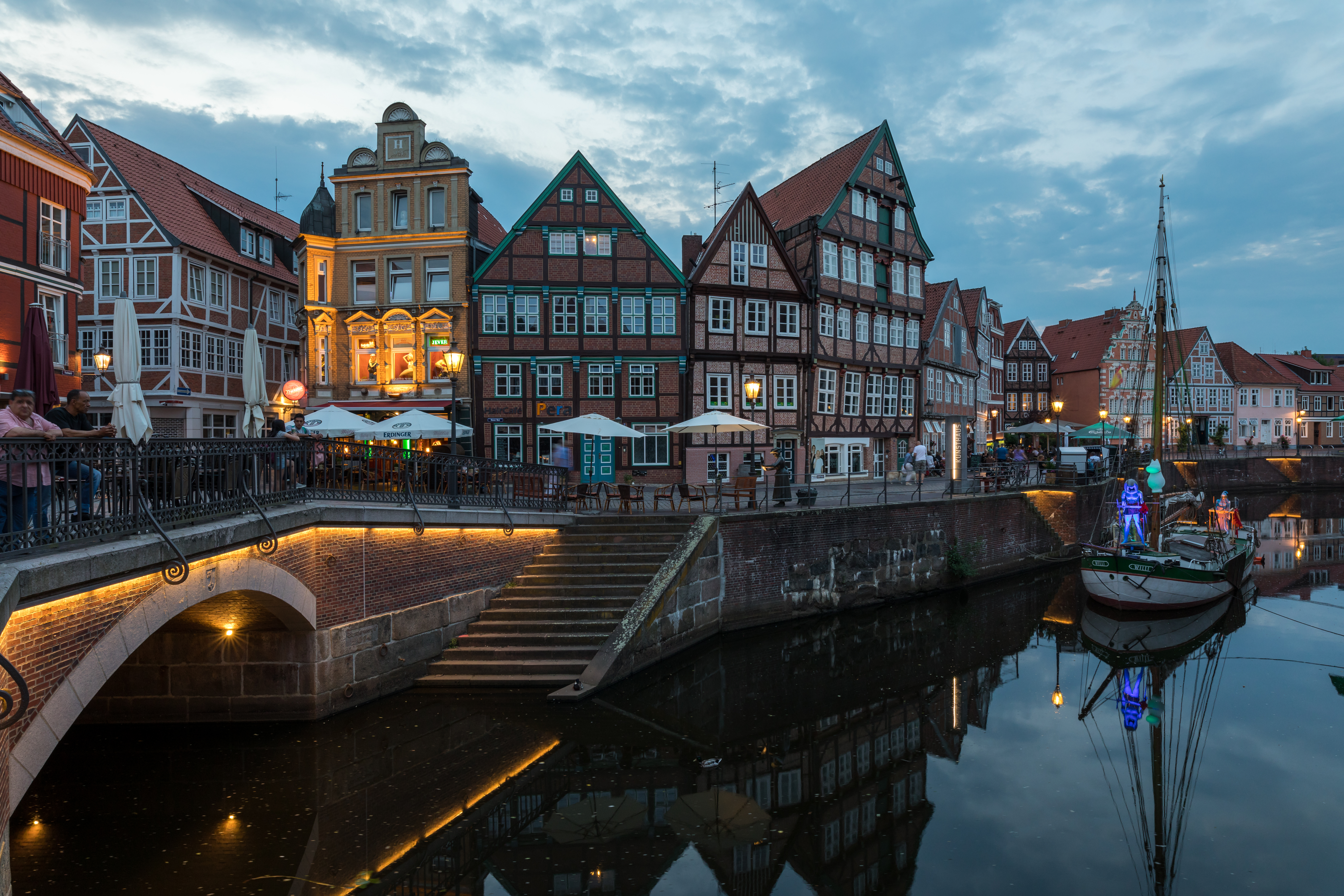
Typical German Fachwerkhäuser in the Hanseatic harbour of Stade, Germany

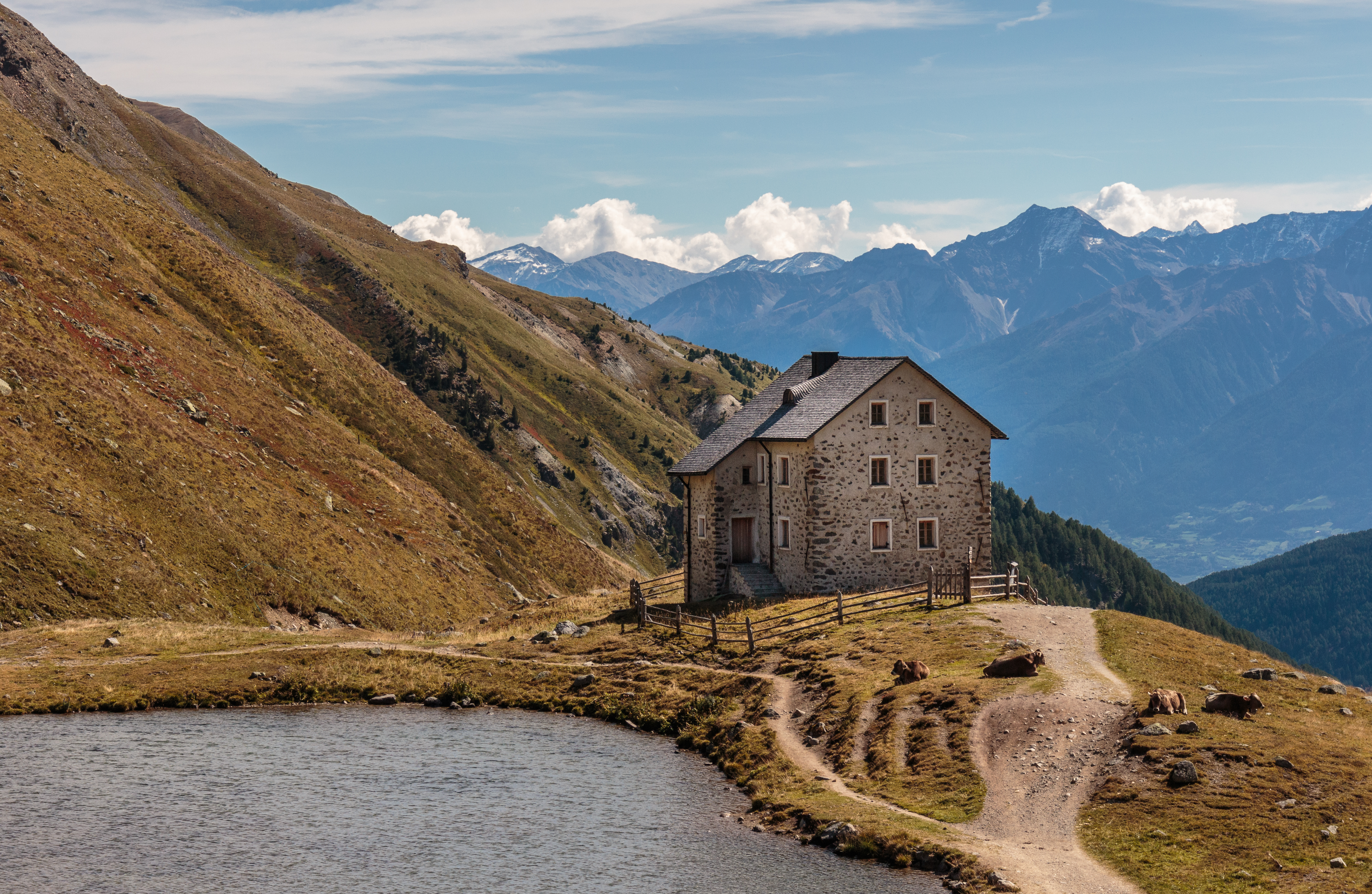
Low-rise house Alte Pforzheimer Hütte near the Pforzheimer See, in the Trentino-Alto Adige region of Northern Italy

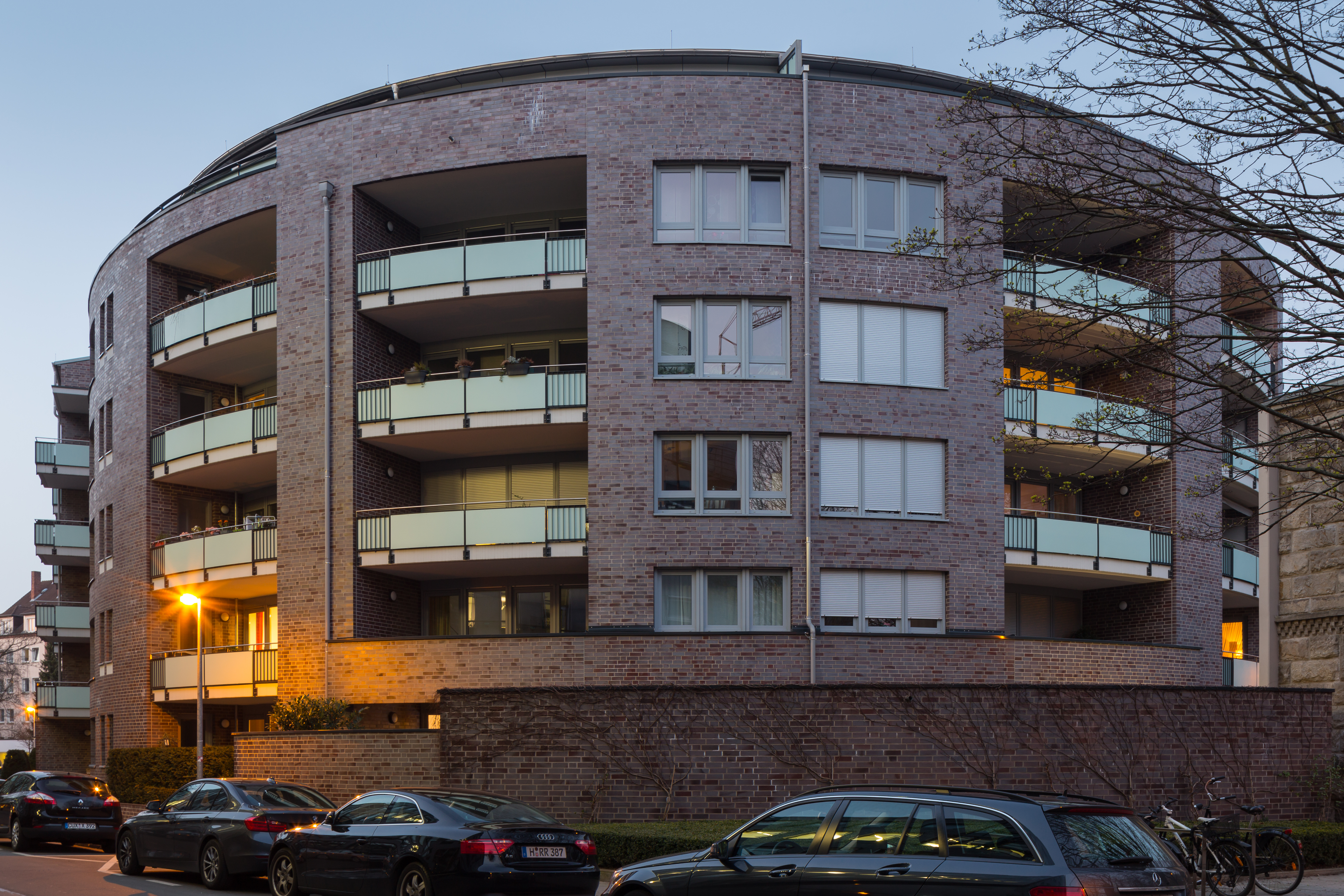
Modern style flat in Hannover, Germany

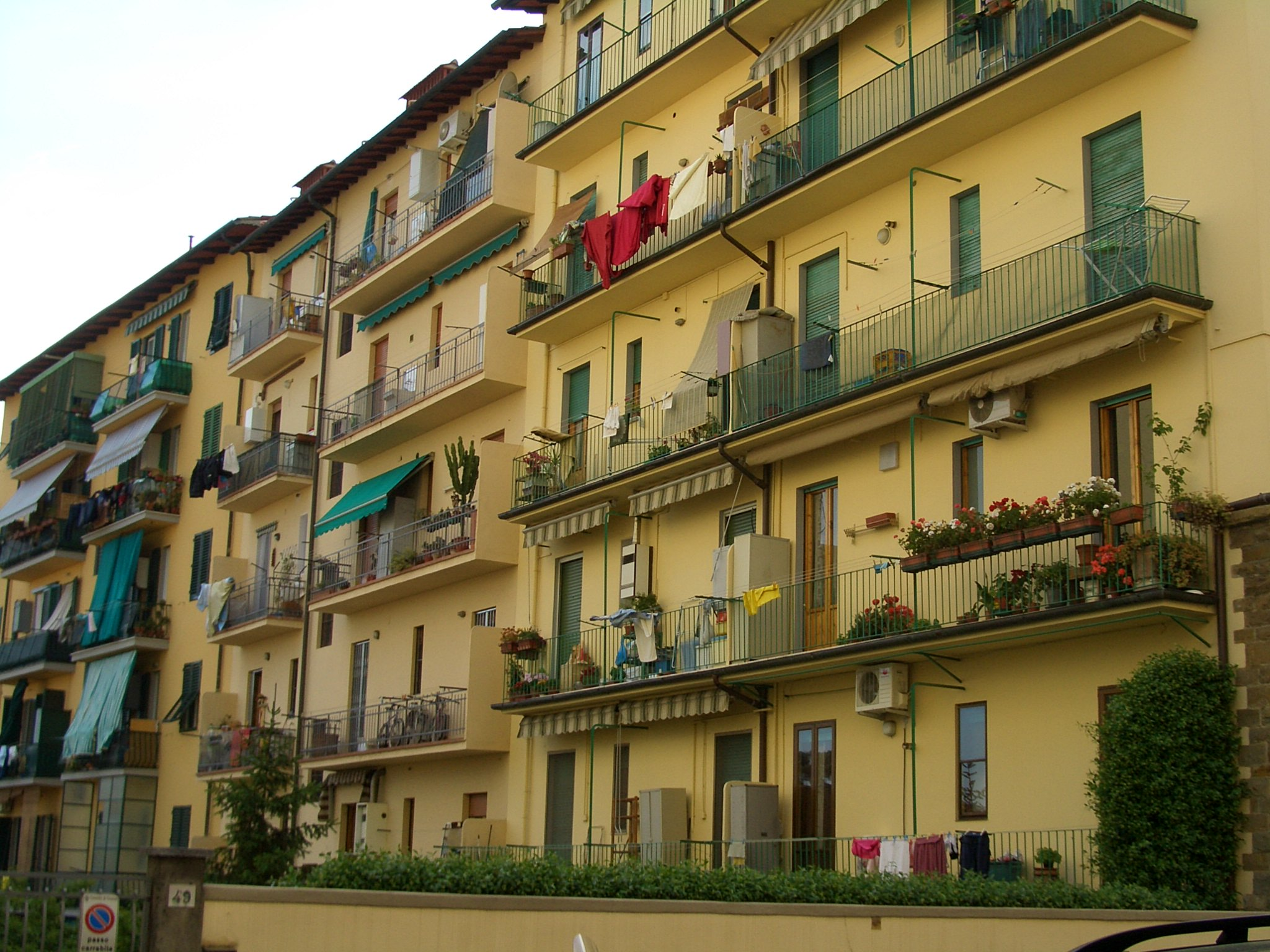
Low-rise flat with balconies in Florence, Italy

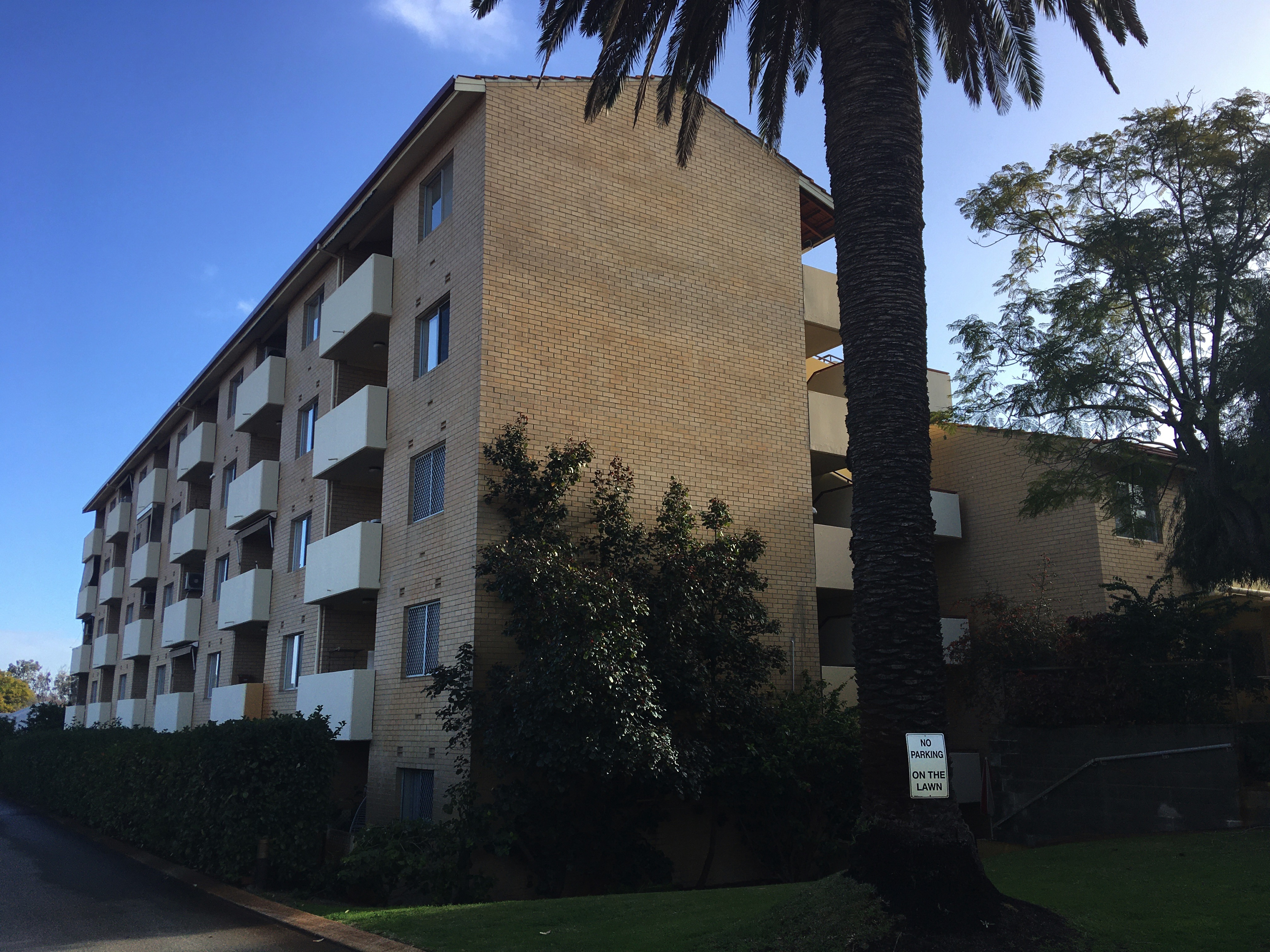
Low-rise apartment complex in Inglewood, Western Australia

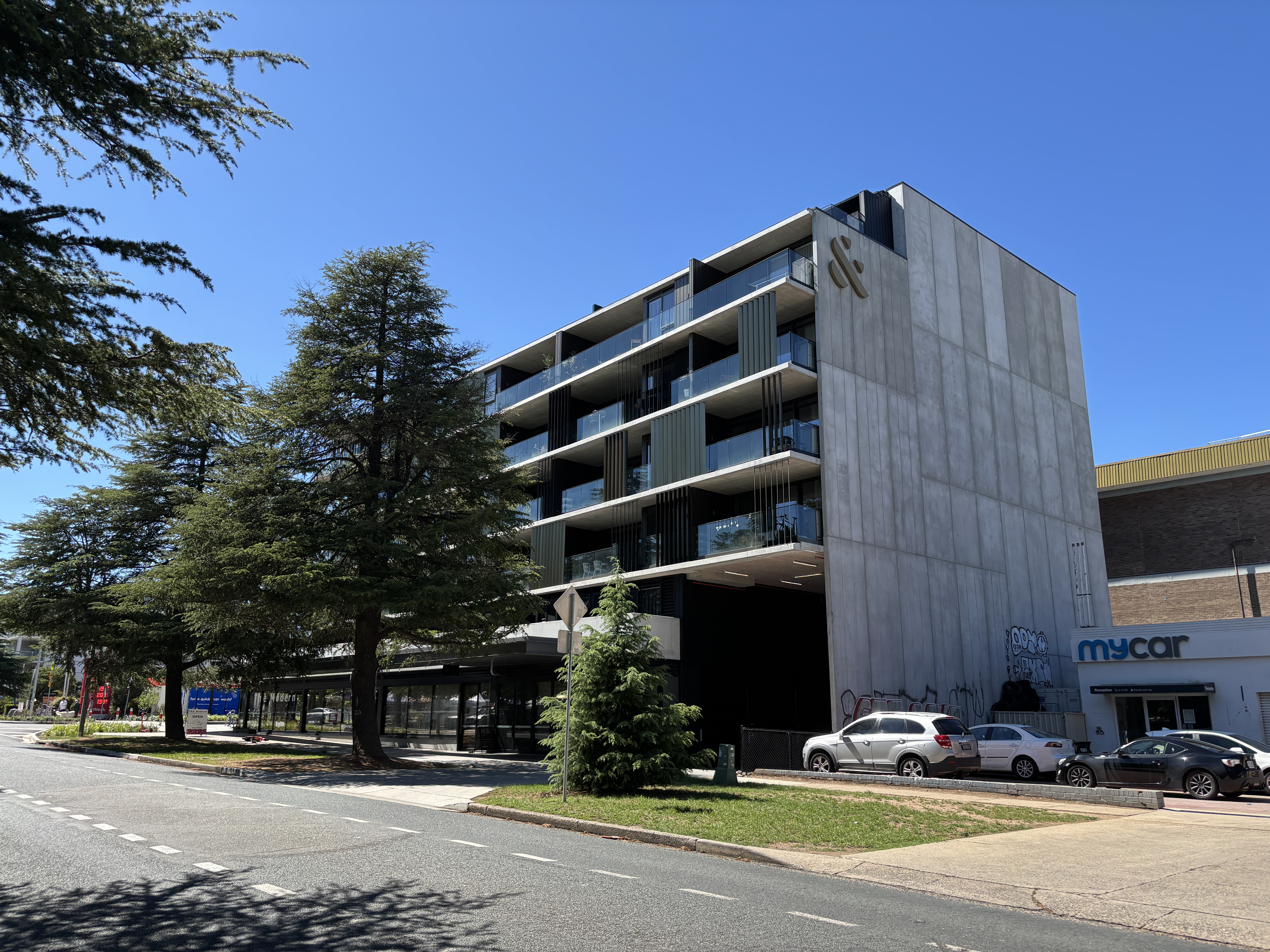
Modern low-rise apartment block in Braddon, Australia

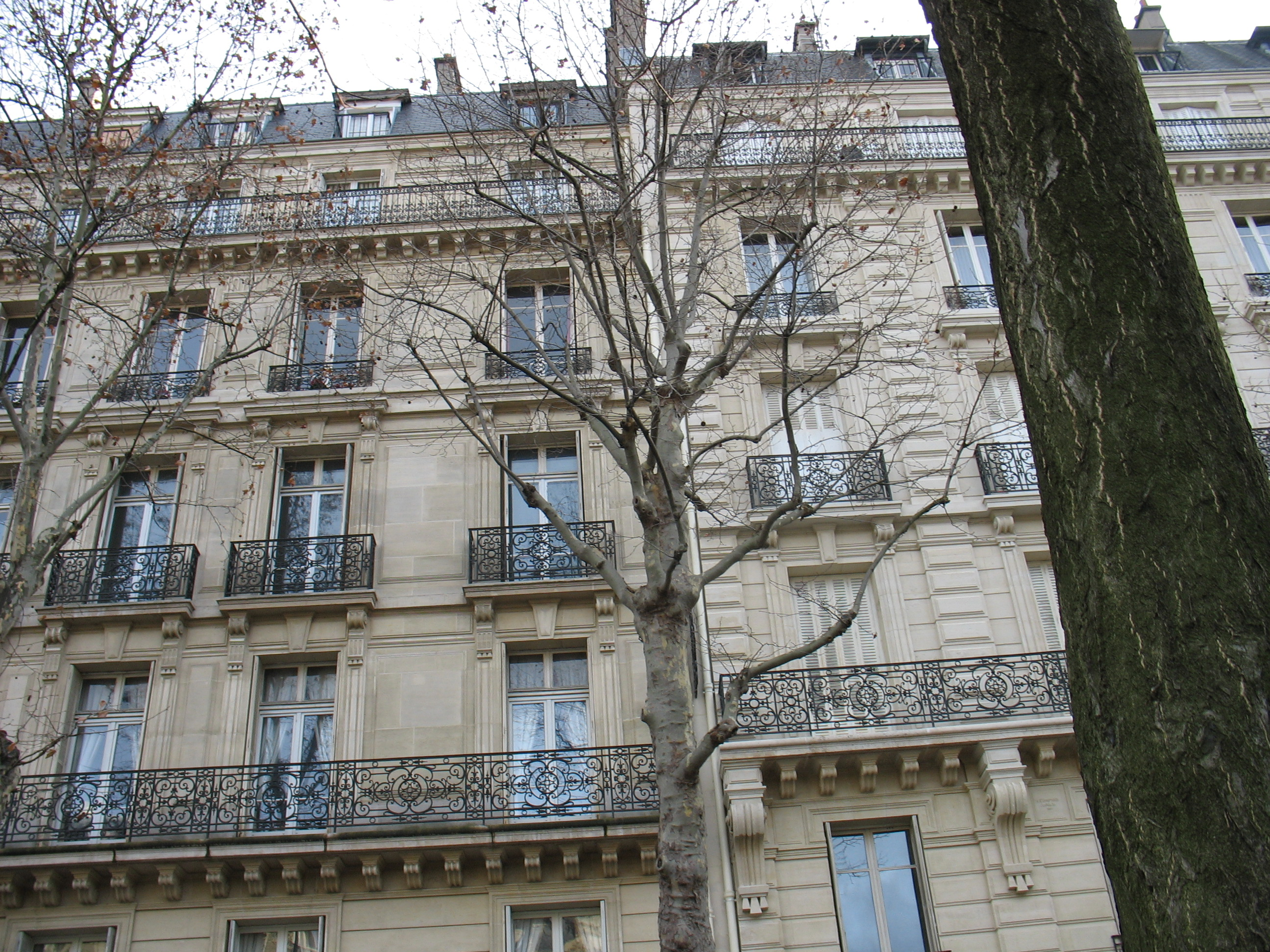
Low-rise apartment in Paris, France

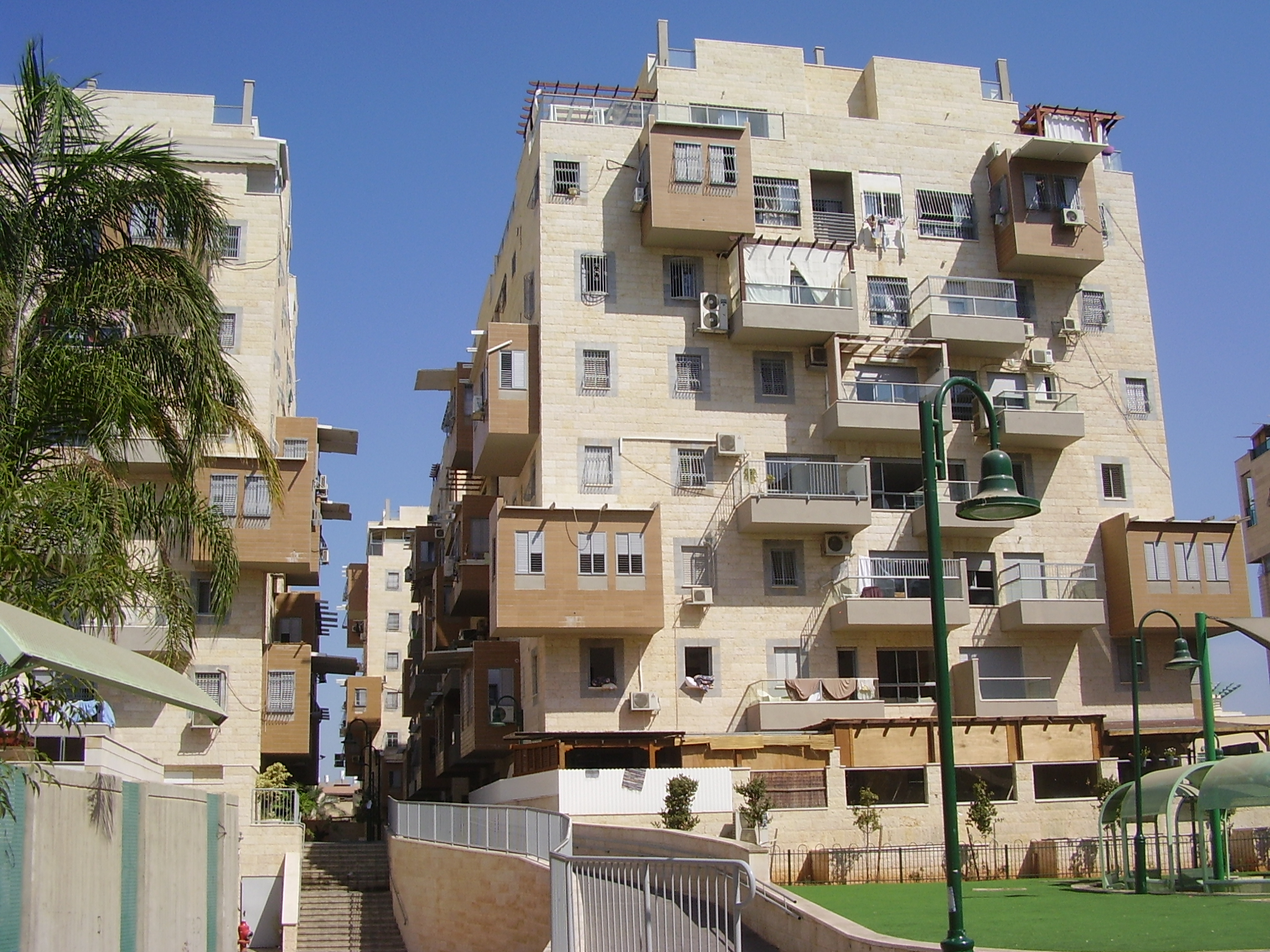
Low-rise apartment blocks in Israel

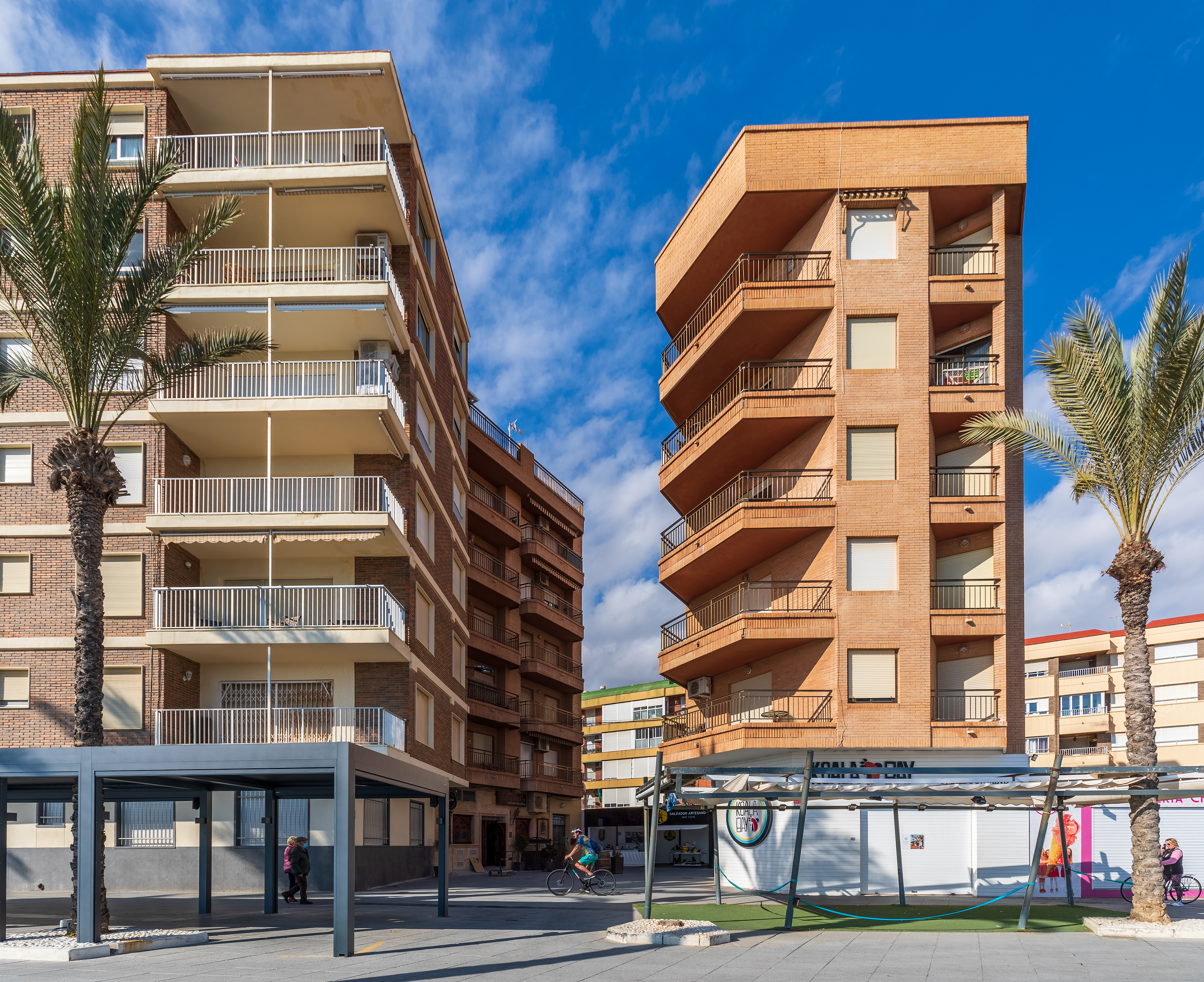
Low-rise apartments in Alicante, Spain
