= Apartment =

Self-contained housing unit occupying part of a building

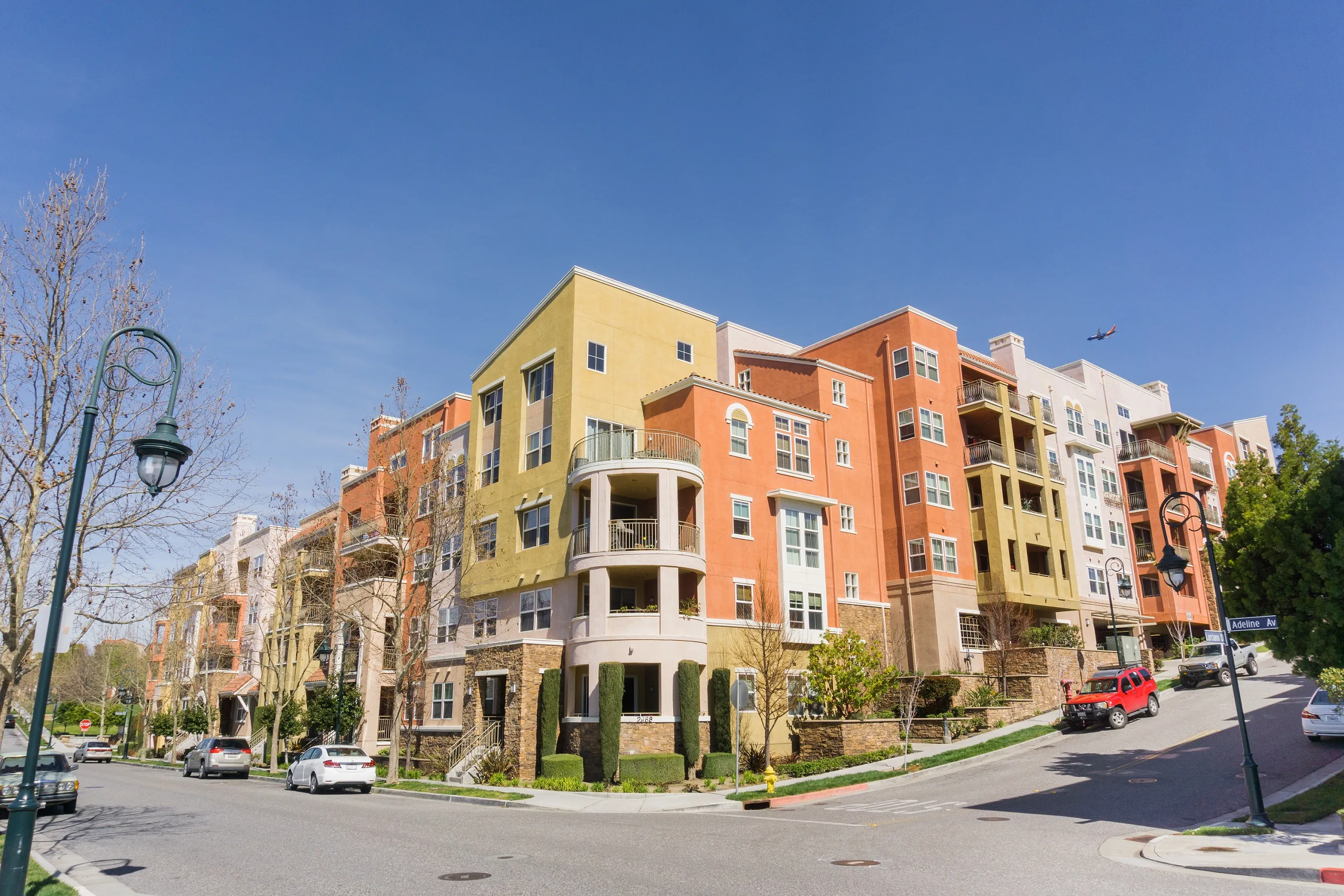
A new-style apartment building at Adeline Avenue and Larciano Street, in San Jose, California, with balconies, a multi-colored scheme, and boxy, geometric shapes, disguising the fact that it is one building

An apartment (North American English), flat (British English, Indian English, South African English) or unit (Australian English), is a self-contained housing unit that occupies part of a building. The housing tenure of apartments also varies considerably, from large-scale public housing, to owner occupancy within what is legally a condominium (strata title or commonhold) or leasehold, to tenants renting from a private landlord. The buildings that contain apartments may be called different things depending on size or country (see below).

== Terminology ==
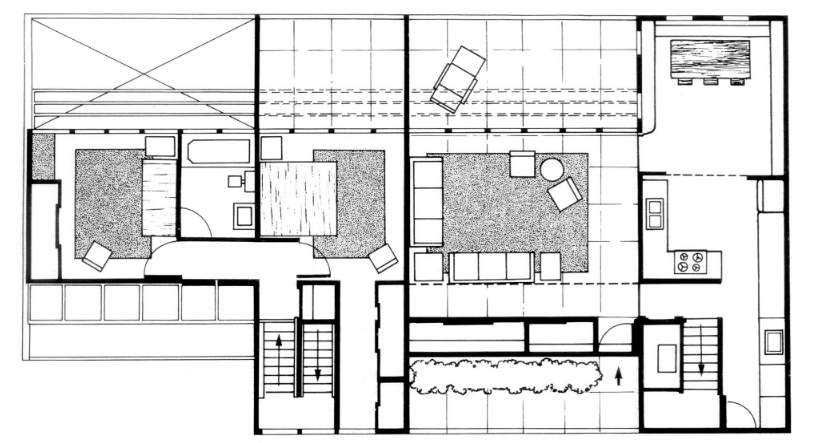
Example of a proposed floor plan for an apartment

The term apartment is favored in North America (although in some Canadian cities, flat is used for a unit which is part of a house containing two or three units, typically one to a floor). In the UK and Australia, flat is the common term, although parts of the real estate industry have recently begun using the term "apartment" for large upmarket flats, especially if their target group is foreign investors.

In some countries, the word "unit" is a more general term referring to both apartments and rental business suites. The word 'unit' is generally used only in the context of a specific building.

"Mixed-use buildings" combine commercial and residential uses within the same structure. Typically, mixed-use buildings consist of businesses on the lower floors (often retail in street-facing ground floor and supporting subterranean levels) and residential apartments on the upper floors.

=== By housing tenure ===
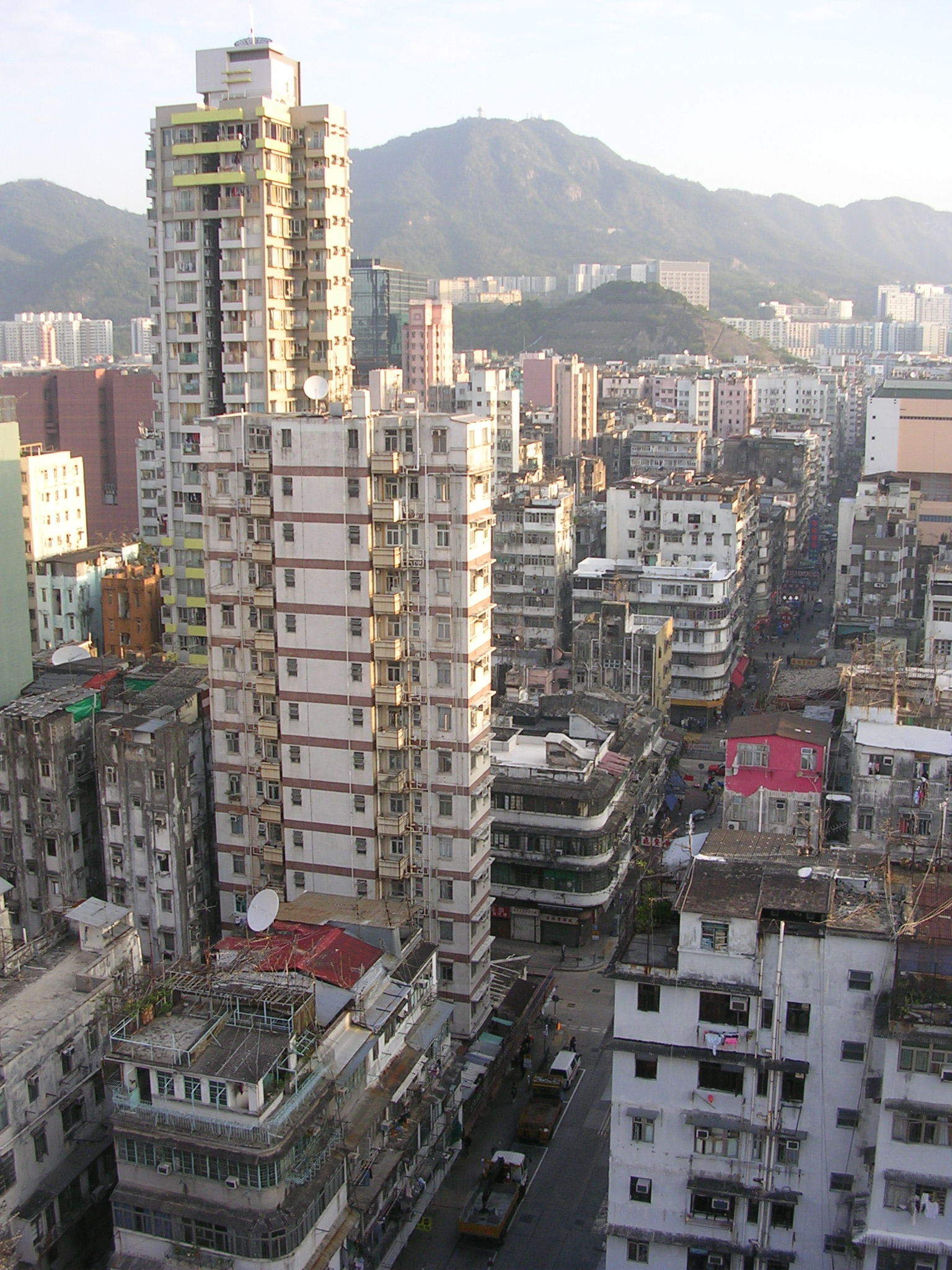
Low-income housing in Sham Shui Po District, Hong Kong

Tenement law refers to the feudal basis of permanent property such as land or rents. It may be found combined as in "Messuage or Tenement" to encompass all the land, buildings and other assets of a property.

In the United States and some other countries, such as Canada, some apartment-dwellers own their units, either as a housing cooperative, in which the residents own shares of a corporation that owns the building or development; or in a condominium, whose residents own their apartments and share ownership of the public spaces. Most apartments are in buildings designed for the purpose, but large older houses are sometimes divided into apartments. The word apartment denotes a residential unit or section in a building. In some locations, particularly the United States, the word connotes a rental unit owned by the building owner, and is not typically used for a condominium.

In England and Wales, some flat owners own shares in the company that owns the freehold of the building as well as holding the flat under a lease. This arrangement is commonly known as a "share of freehold" flat. The freehold company has the right to collect annual ground rents from each of the flat owners in the building. The freeholder can also develop or sell the building, subject to the usual planning and restrictions that might apply. This situation does not happen in Scotland, where long leasehold of residential property was previously unusual and now is impossible.

=== By size and other characteristics of the building ===
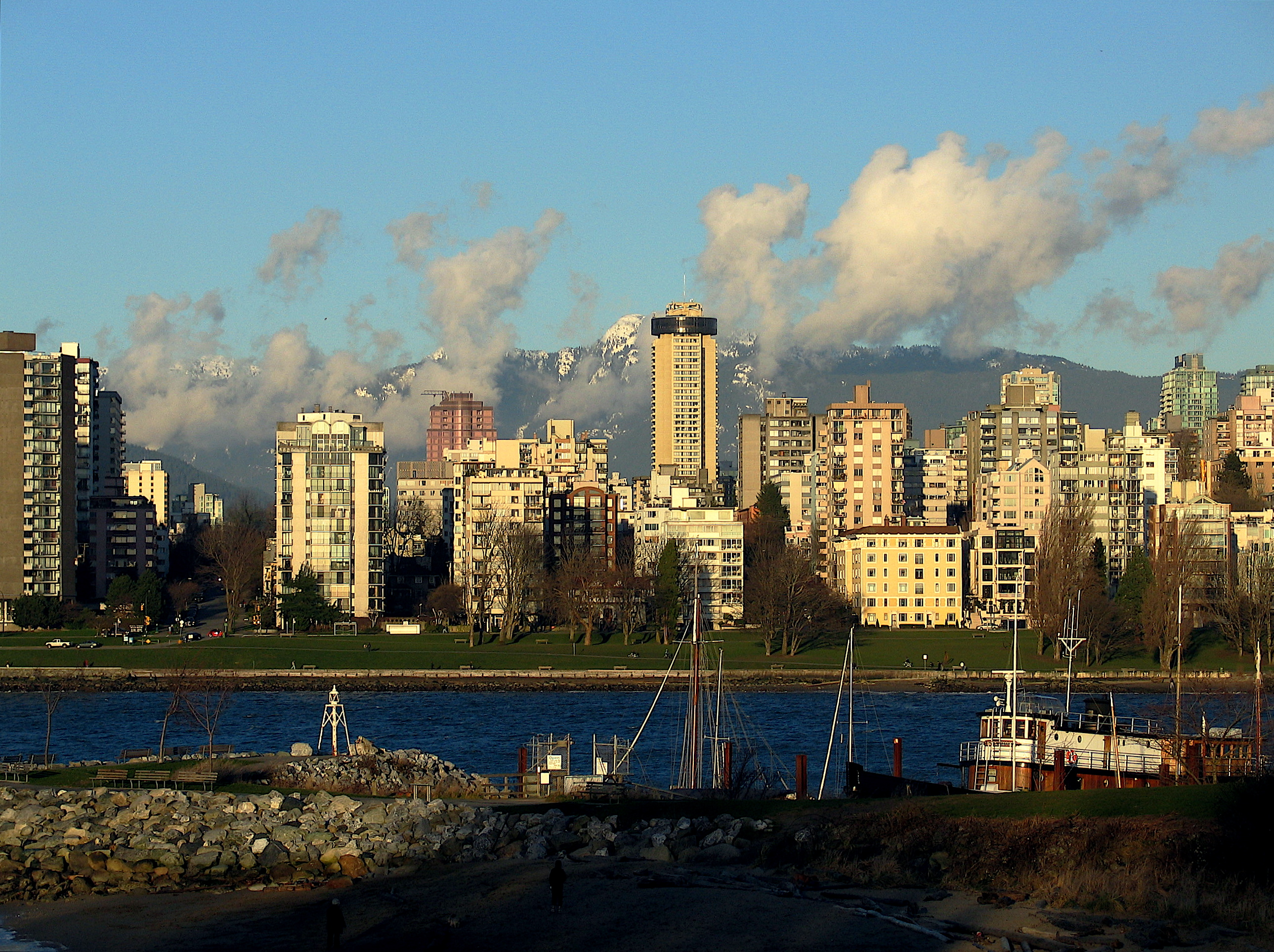
High-rise buildings in the English Bay area of Vancouver, British Columbia, Canada

Apartment buildings are multi-story buildings where three or more residences are contained within one structure. Such a building may be called an apartment building, apartment complex, flat complex, block of flats, tenement (Scotland),tower block, high-rise or, occasionally, mansion block (in British English), especially if it consists of many apartments for rent. A high-rise apartment building is commonly referred to as a residential tower, apartment tower, or block of flats in Australia.

A high-rise building is defined by its height differently in various jurisdictions. It may be only residential, in which case it might also be called a tower block, or it might include other functions such as hotels, offices, or shops. There is no clear difference between a tower block and a skyscraper, although a building with fifty or more stories is generally considered a skyscraper. High-rise buildings became possible with the invention of the elevator (lift) and cheaper, more abundant building materials. Their structural system usually is made of reinforced concrete and steel.

A low-rise building and mid-rise buildings have fewer stories, but the limits are not always clear. Emporis defines a low-rise as "an enclosed structure below 35 metres [115 feet] which is divided into regular floor levels." The city of Toronto defines a mid-rise as a building between 4 and 12 stories. Most low-rise apartment buildings are walk-ups, lacking elevators

Garden apartment buildings are usually one or two storey structures where the individual apartments open directly to the outdoors and where the building or complex offers landscaped grounds.

=== By country ===
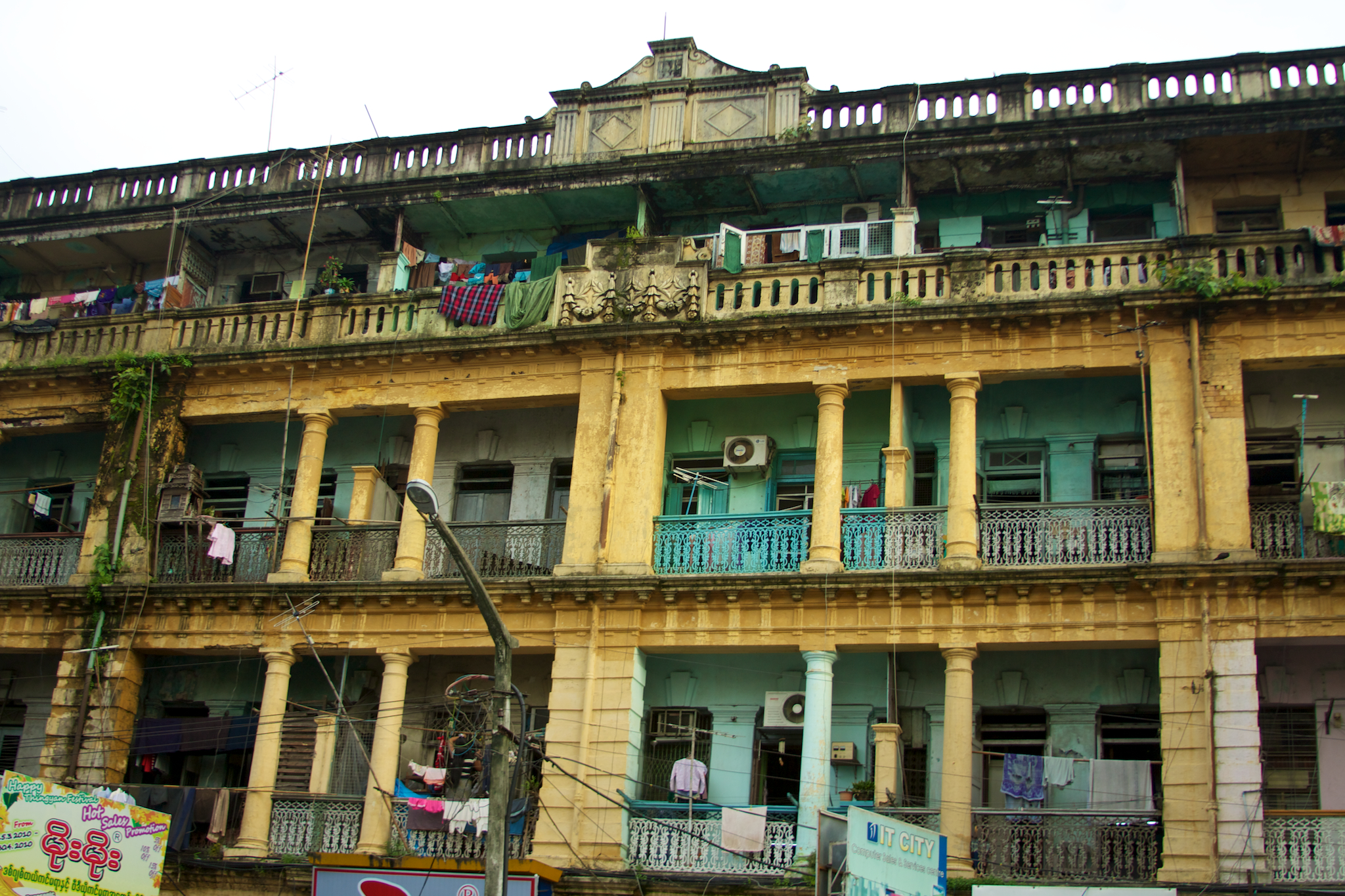
Apartments in a colonial-era building in Yangon

In American English, the distinction between rental apartments and condominiums is that while rental buildings are owned by a single entity and rented out to many, condominiums are owned individually, while their owners still pay a monthly or yearly fee for building upkeep. Condominiums are often leased by their owner as rental apartments. A third alternative, the cooperative apartment building (or "co-op"), acts as a corporation with all of the tenants as shareholders of the building. Tenants in cooperative buildings do not own their apartment, but instead own a proportional number of shares of the entire cooperative. As in condominiums, cooperators pay a monthly fee for building upkeep. Co-ops are common in cities such as New York, and have gained some popularity in other larger urban areas in the U.S.

In British English the usual word is "flat", but apartment is used by property developers to denote expensive "flats" in exclusive and expensive residential areas in, for example, parts of London such as Belgravia and Hampstead. In Scotland, it is called a block of flats or, if it is a traditional sandstone building, a tenement, a term which has a negative connotation elsewhere.

In India and South Africa, the words "flat" and "apartment" are interchangeably used to refer to a housing unit in a building. The word "flat" is also used to refer to multi-story dwellings that have lifts.

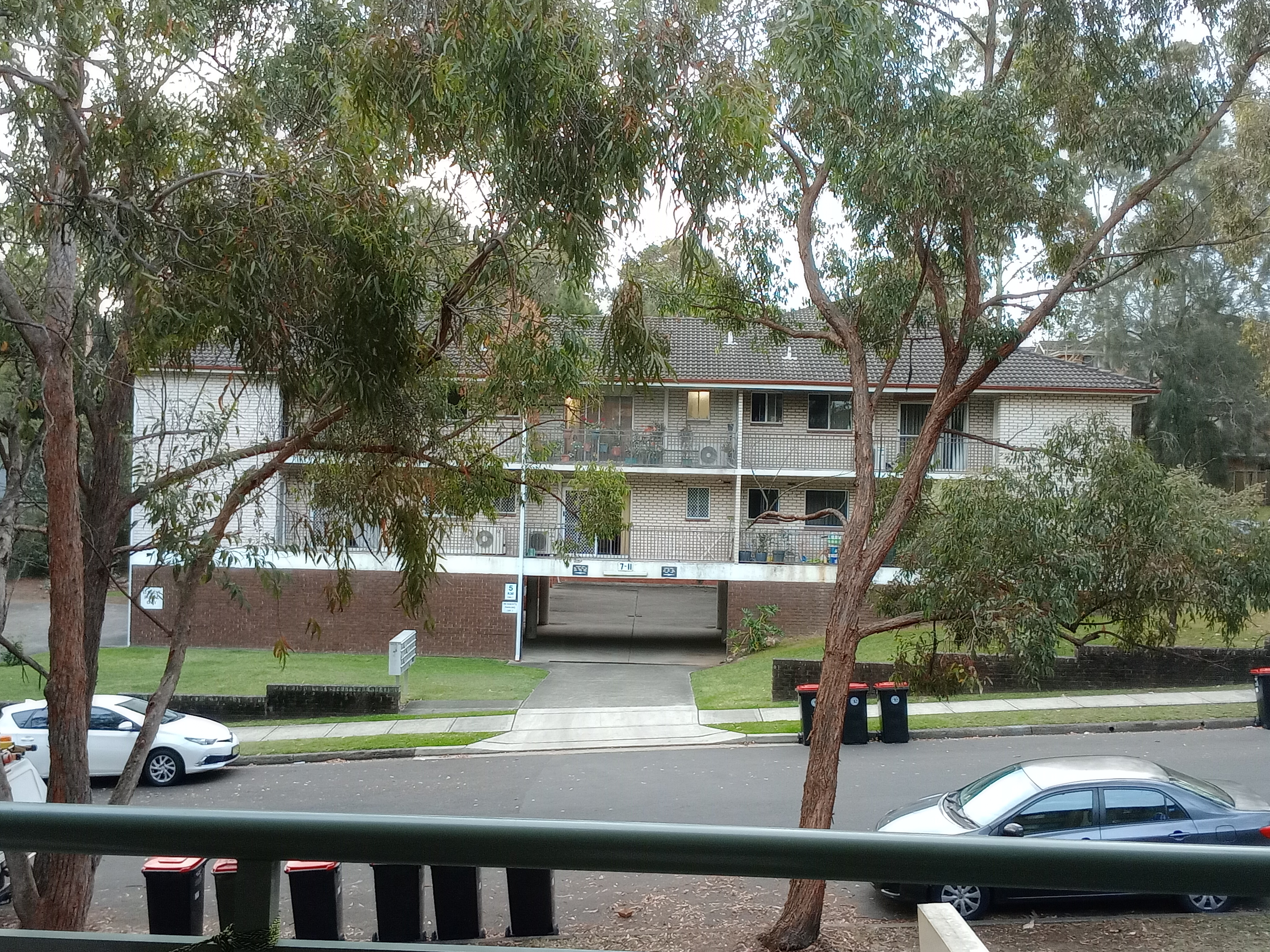
A two-story flat at Granville, NSW

Australian English and New Zealand English traditionally used the term flat (although it also applies to any rental property), and more recently also use the terms unit or apartment. In Australia, a 'unit' refers to flats, apartments or even semi-detached houses. In Australia, the terms "unit", "flat" and "apartment" are largely used interchangeably. Newer high-rise buildings are more often marketed as "apartments", as the term "flats" carries colloquial connotations. The term condominium or condo is rarely used in Australia despite attempts by developers to market it.

In Malaysian English, flat often denotes a housing block of two rooms with walk-up, no lift, without facilities, typically five stories tall, and with outdoor parking space, while apartment is more generic and may also include luxury condominiums.

In Japanese English loanwords (Wasei-eigo), the term apartment (アパート apaato) is used for lower-income housing and mansion (マンション manshon) is used for high-end apartments; but both terms refer to what English-speakers regard as an apartment. This use of the term mansion has a parallel with British English's mansion block, a term denoting prestigious apartment buildings from the Victorian and Edwardian, which usually feature an ornate facade and large, high-ceilinged flats with period features. Danchi is the Japanese word for a large cluster of apartment buildings of a particular style and design, typically built as public housing by government authorities. See Housing in Japan.

== Types and characteristics ==
=== Studio apartment ===
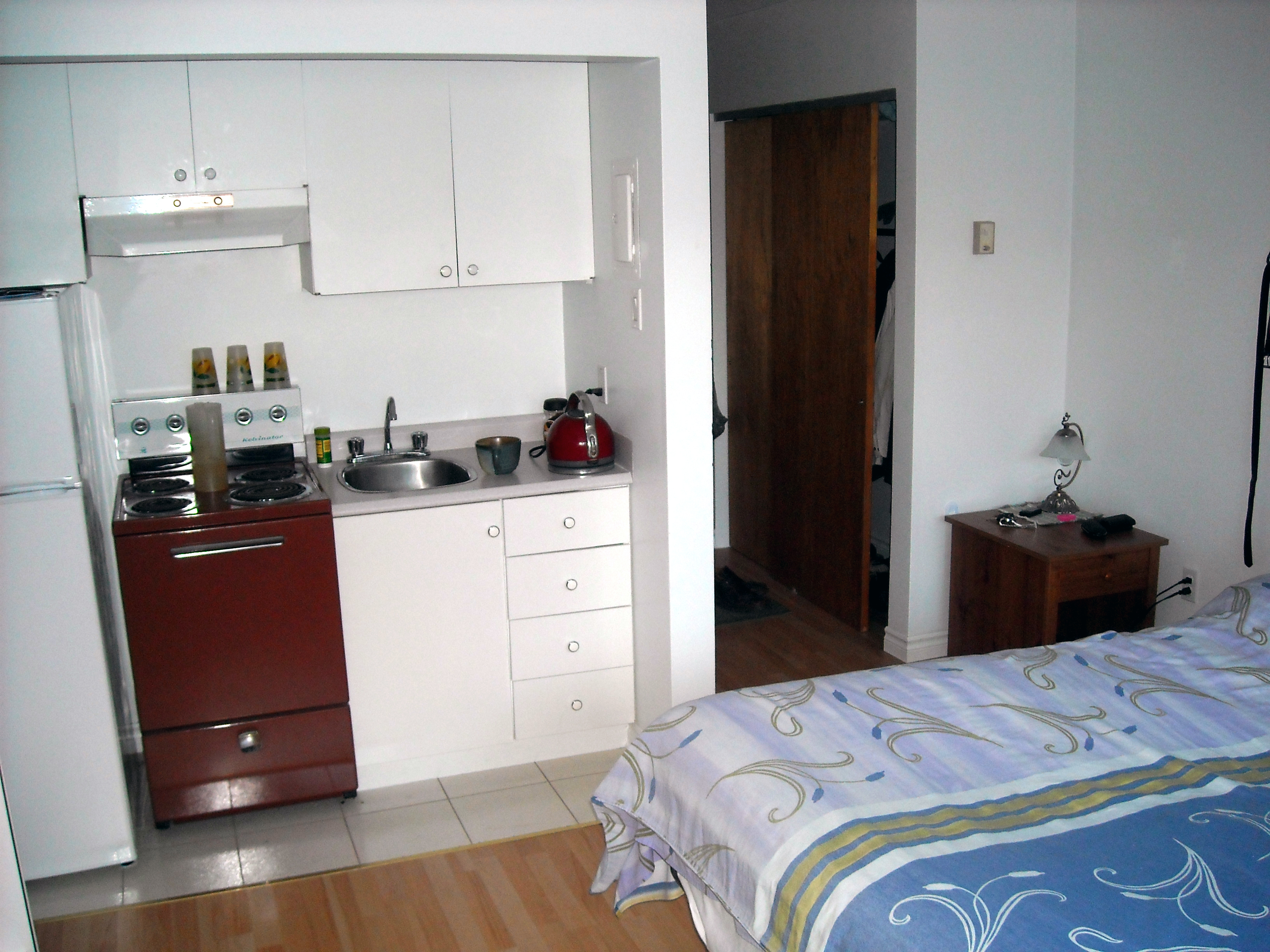
Studio apartment in Sherbrooke, Quebec, Canada, showing double bed, kitchenette, and entrance way with sliding door to closet

The smallest self-contained apartments are referred to as studio, efficiency or bachelor apartments in the US and Canada, or studio flat in the UK. These units usually consist of a large single main room which acts as the living room, dining room and bedroom combined and usually also includes kitchen facilities, with a separate bathroom. In Korea, the term "one room" (wonroom) refers to a studio apartment.

A bedsit is a UK variant on single room accommodation: a bed-sitting room, probably without cooking facilities, with a shared bathroom. A bedsit is not self-contained and so is not an apartment or flat as this article uses the terms; it forms part of what the UK government calls a house in multiple occupation.

The American variant of the bedsit is the single room occupancy.

=== Garden apartment (US) ===
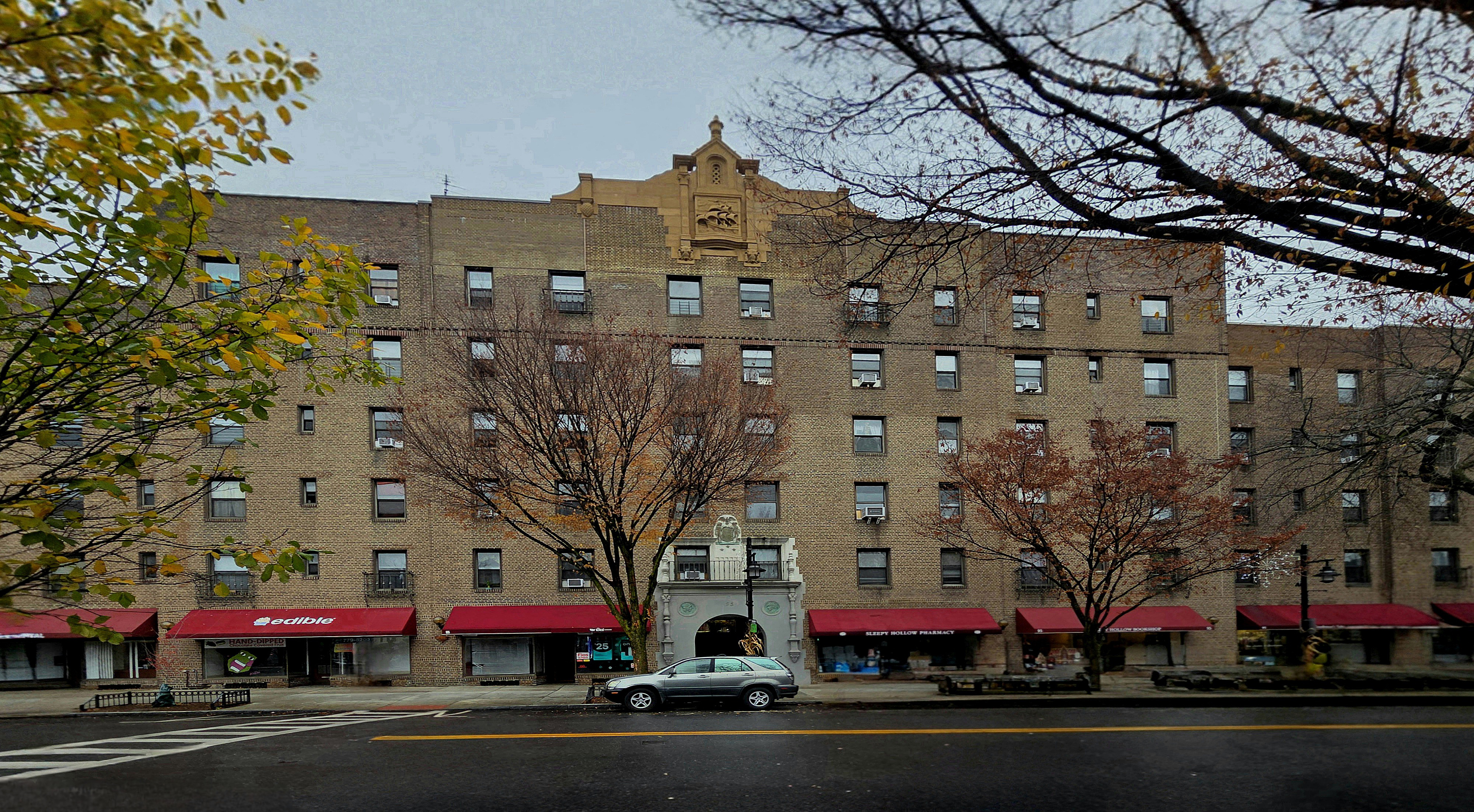
Van Tassel Apartments, a 1929 garden apartment complex in Sleepy Hollow, New York

Merriam-Webster defines a garden apartment in American English as "a multiple-unit low-rise dwelling having considerable lawn or garden space." The apartment buildings are often arranged around courtyards that are open at one end. Such a garden apartment shares some characteristics of a townhouse: each apartment has its own building entrance, or shares that entrance via a staircase and lobby that adjoins other units immediately above and/or below it. Unlike a townhouse, each apartment occupies only one level. Such garden apartment buildings are almost never more than three stories high, since they typically lack elevators. However, the first "garden apartment" buildings in New York, US, built in the early 1900s, were constructed five stories high. Some garden apartment buildings place a one-car garage under each apartment. The interior grounds are often landscaped.

In Chicago, a garden apartment refers to a basement apartment.

=== Garden flat (UK) ===
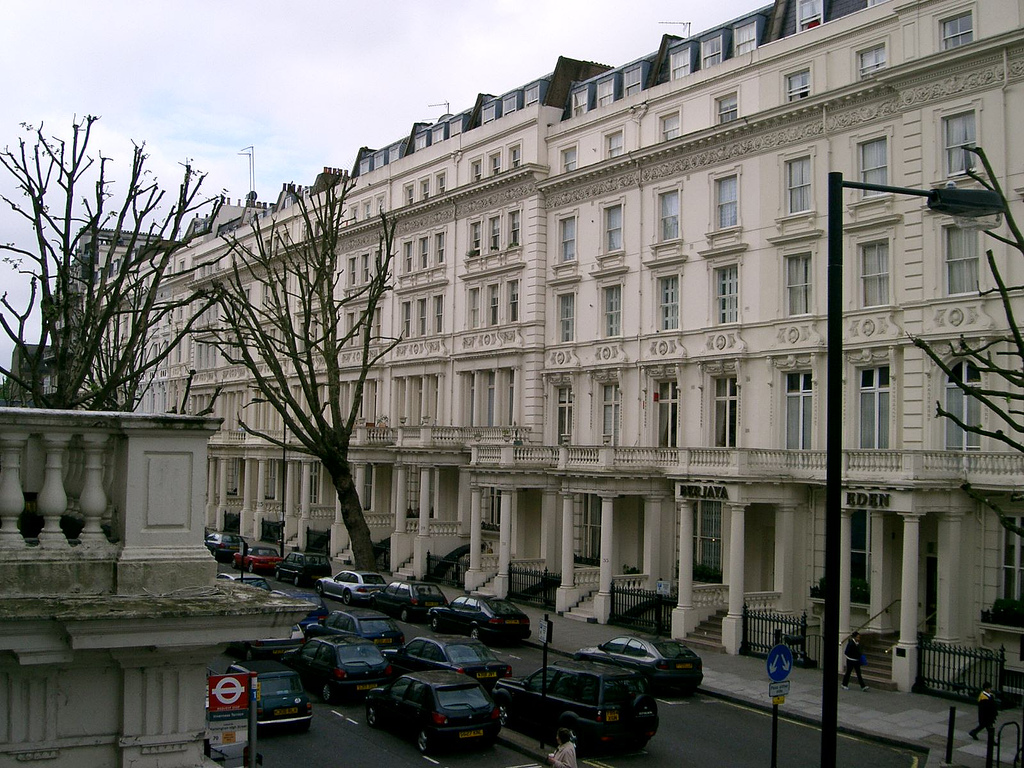
Georgian terraced townhouses in London, England. The black railings enclose the basement areas, which in the twentieth century were converted to garden flats.

The Oxford English Dictionary defines the use of "garden flat" in British English as "a basement or ground-floor flat with a view of and access to a garden or lawn", although its citations acknowledge that the reference to a garden may be illusory. "Garden flat" can serve simply as a euphemism for a basement. The large Georgian or Victorian townhouse was built with an excavated subterranean space around its front known as an area, often surrounded by cast iron railings. This lowest floor housed the kitchen, the main place of work for the servants, with a "tradesman's entrance" via the area stairs. This "lower ground floor" (another euphemism) has proven ideal for conversion to a self-contained "garden flat". One American term for this arrangement is an English basement.

=== Basement apartment ===
Generally on the lowest (below ground) floor of a building.

=== Garret apartment ===
A unit in the attic of a building and usually converted from domestic servants' quarters. These apartments are characterized by their sloping walls, which can restrict the usable space; the resultant stair climb in buildings that do not have elevators and the sloping walls can make garret apartments less desirable than units on lower floors. However, because these apartments are located on the top floors of their buildings, they can offer the best views and are quieter because of the lack of upstairs neighbours.

=== Secondary suite ===
When part of a house is converted for the ostensible use of the owner's family member, the self-contained dwelling may be known as an "in-law apartment", "annex", or "granny flat", though these (sometimes illegally) created units are often occupied by ordinary renters rather than the landlord's relative. In Canada these are commonly located below the main house and are therefore "basement suites". Another term is an "accessory dwelling unit", which may be part of the main house, or a free-standing structure in its grounds.

=== Salon apartment ===
Salon apartment is a term linked to the exclusive apartments built as part of multi-family houses in Belgrade and in certain towns in Yugoslavia in the first decades of the 20th century. The structure of the apartments included centrally located anteroom with a combined function of the dining room and one or more salon areas. Most of these apartments were built in Belgrade (Serbia), along with the first examples of apartments popularly named 'salon apartments', with the concept of spatial and functional organization later spreading to other larger urban centers in Yugoslavia.

=== Maisonette ===
Maisonette (from maisonnette, French for "little house" and originally the spelling in English as well, but it has since fallen into disuse) has no strict definition, but the OED suggests "a part of a residential building which is occupied separately, usually on more than one floor and having its own outside entrance." It differs from a flat in having usually more than one floor, with a staircase internal to the dwelling leading from the entrance floor to the upper (or, in some cases, lower) other floor. It is a very common arrangement in much post-war British housing (especially but not exclusively public housing) and serves both to reduce costs by reducing the amount of space given to access corridors and to emulate the 'traditional' two-story terraced house to which many of the residents had been accustomed. It also allows for apartments, even when they are accessed by a corridor, to have windows on both sides of the building.

A maisonette could encompass Tyneside flats, pairs of single-story flats within a two-story terrace. Their distinctive feature is their use of two separate front doors onto the street, each door leading to a single flat. "Maisonette" could also stretch to cottage flats, also known as 'four-in-a-block flats', a style of housing common in Scotland.

=== One dwelling with two storys ===
Plan of scissor flats

The vast majority of apartments are on one level, hence "flat". Some, however, have two storys joined internally by stairs, just like many houses. One term for this is "maisonette", as above. Some housing in the United Kingdom, both public and private, was designed as scissor section flats. On a grander level, penthouses may have more than one story to emphasize the idea of space and luxury. Two-story units in new construction are sometimes referred to as "townhouses" in some countries (though not usually in Britain).

=== Small buildings with a few one-story dwellings ===
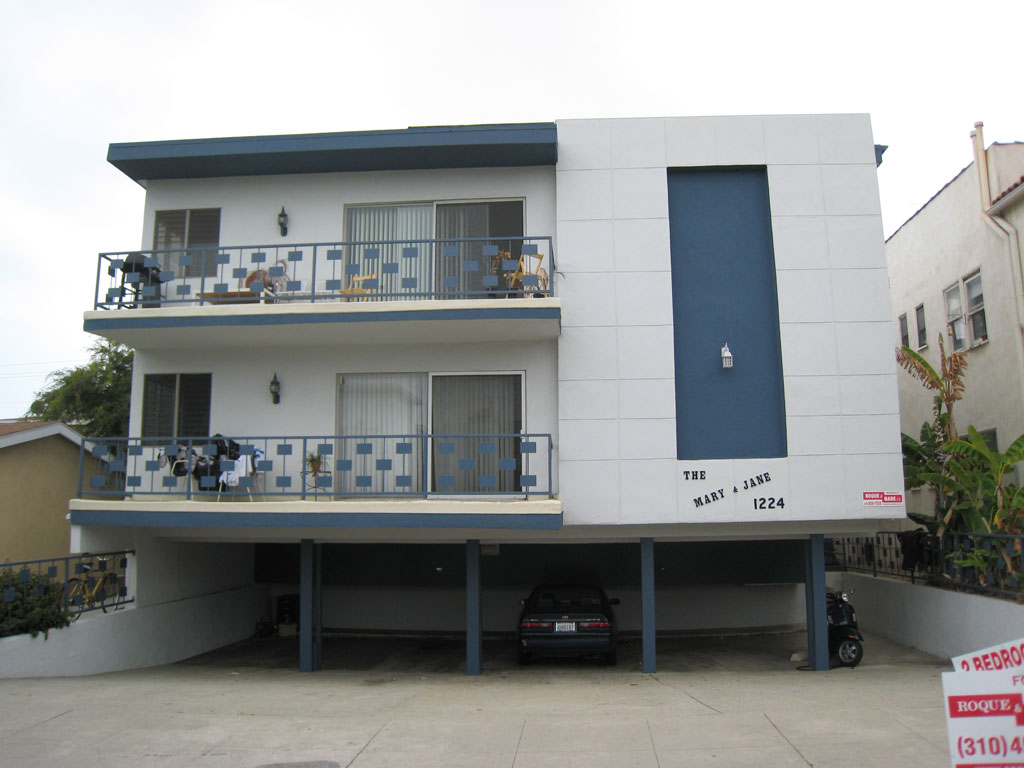
A dingbat, "The Mary & Jane", note styled balconies.

"Duplex" refers to two separate units horizontally adjacent, with a common demising wall, or vertically adjacent, with a floor-ceiling assembly.

Duplex description can be different depending on the part of the US, but generally has two to four dwellings with a door for each and usually two front doors close together but separate—referred to as 'duplex', indicating the number of units, not the number of floors, as in some areas of the country they are often only one story. Groups of more than two units have corresponding names (Triplex, etc.). Those buildings that have a third story are known as triplexes. See Three-decker (house)

In the United States, regional forms have developed, see vernacular architecture. In Milwaukee, a Polish flat or "raised cottage" is a small house that has been lifted up to accommodate a basement floor housing a separate apartment, then set down again, thus becoming a modest pair of dwellings. In the Sun Belt, boxy small apartment buildings called dingbats, often with carports below, sprang up from the 1950s.

In the United Kingdom the term duplex is usually applied to an apartment with two storys (with an internal staircase), neither of which is located at ground level. Such homes are frequently found in low-cost rental housing, in apartment blocks constructed by local authorities, or above street-level retail units, where they may be occupied by the occupier of the retail unit or rented out separately. Buildings containing two dwellings with a common vertical wall are known as semi-detached, or colloquially semis. This form of construction is very common and built as such rather than being a later conversion.

=== Loft apartment ===
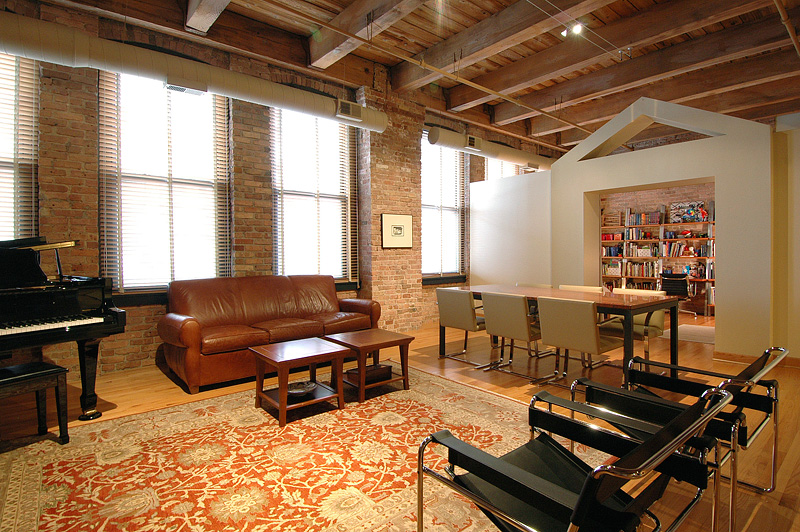
The interior of a loft conversion in Chicago

This type of apartment developed in the US during the middle of the 20th century. The term initially described a living space created within a former industrial building, usually 19th century. These large apartments found favor with artists and musicians wanting accommodation in large cities (New York for example) and are related to unused buildings in the decaying parts of such cities being occupied illegally by people squatting.

These loft apartments were usually located in former high-rise warehouses and factories left vacant after town planning rules and economic conditions in the mid 20th century changed. The resulting apartments created a new bohemian lifestyle and were arranged in a completely different way from most urban living spaces, often including workshops and art studio spaces. As the supply of old buildings of a suitable nature has dried up, developers have responded by constructing new buildings in the same aesthetic with varying degrees of success.

An industrial, warehouse, or commercial space converted to an apartment is commonly called a loft, although some modern lofts are built by design.

=== Penthouse ===
A penthouse is an apartment usually located on the top floor of a high-rise apartment building. This type of house has exclusive features like private elevators, landscaped terraces, and high ceilings.

=== Communal apartment ===
In Russia, a communal apartment («коммуналка») is a room with a shared kitchen and bath. A typical arrangement is a cluster of five or so room-apartments with a common kitchen and bathroom and separate front doors, occupying a floor in a pre-Revolutionary mansion. Traditionally a room is owned by the government and assigned to a family on a semi-permanent basis.

=== Serviced apartment ===
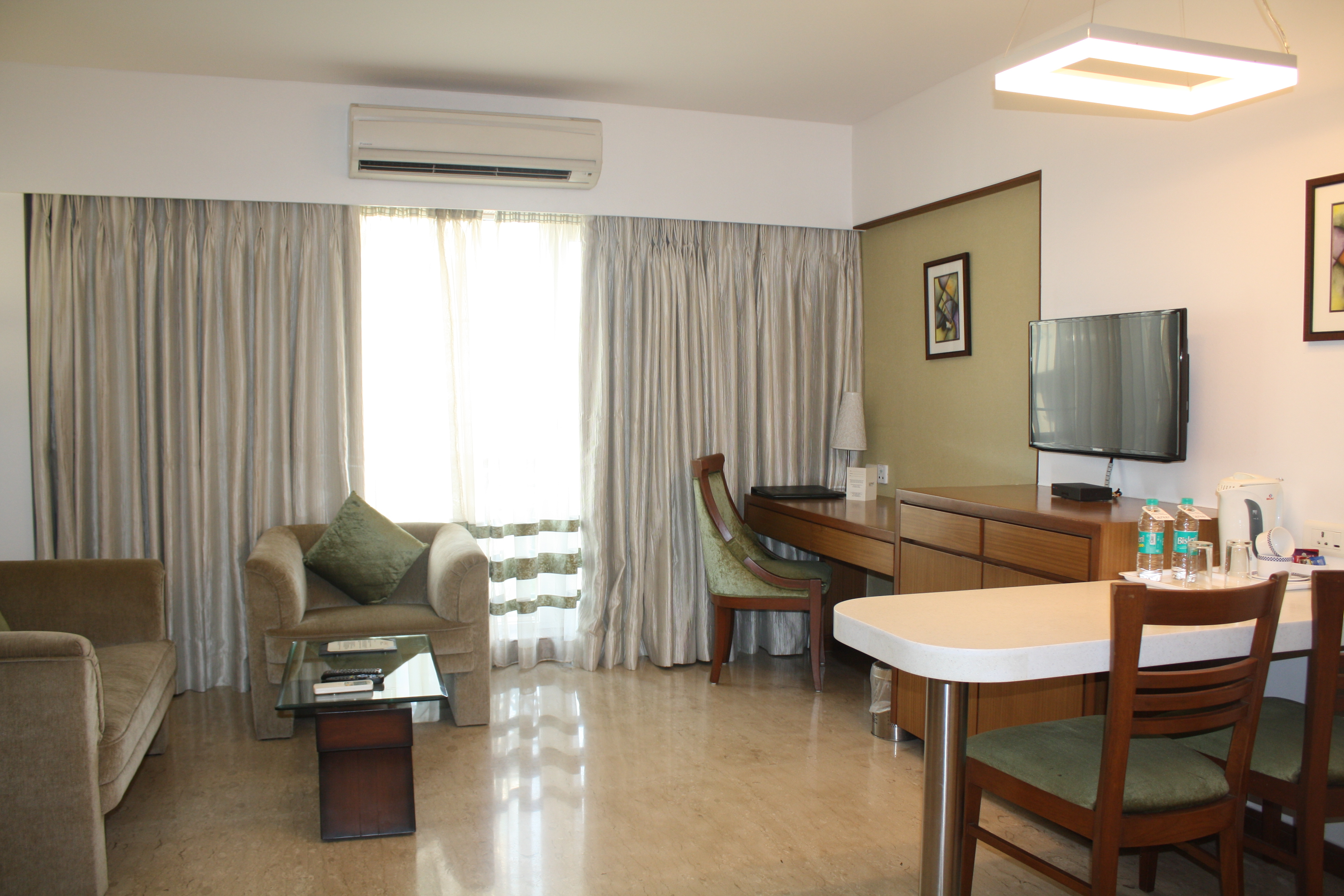
Serviced apartment, Mumbai, India

A serviced apartment is any-size space for residential living that includes regular maid and cleaning services provided by the rental agent. Serviced apartments or serviced flats developed in the early part of the 20th century and were briefly fashionable in the 1920s and 30s. They are intended to combine the best features of luxury and self-contained apartments, often being an adjunct of a hotel. Like guests semi-permanently installed in a luxury hotel, residents could enjoy the additional facilities such as house keeping, laundry, catering and other services if and when desired.

A feature of these apartment blocks was quite glamorous interiors with lavish bathrooms but no kitchen or laundry spaces in each flat. This style of living became very fashionable as many upper-class people found they could not afford as many live-in staff after the First World War and revelled in a "lock-up and leave" life style that serviced apartment hotels supplied. Some buildings have been subsequently renovated with standard facilities in each apartment, but serviced apartment hotel complexes continue to be constructed. Recently a number of hotels have supplemented their traditional business model with serviced apartment wings, creating privately owned areas within their buildings - either freehold or leasehold.

=== Facilities ===
Laundry room

Apartments may be available for rent furnished, with furniture, or unfurnished into which a tenant moves in with his own furniture. Serviced apartments, intended to be convenient for shorter stays, include soft furnishings and kitchen utensils, and maid service.

Laundry facilities may reside in a common area accessible to all building tenants, or each apartment may have its own facilities. Depending on when the building was built and its design, utilities such as water, heating, and electricity may be common for all of the apartments, or separate for each apartment and billed separately to each tenant. (Many areas in the US have ruled it illegal to split a water bill among all the tenants, especially if a pool is on the premises.) Outlets for connection to telephones are typically included in apartments. Telephone service is optional and is almost always billed separately from the rent payments. Cable television and similar amenities also cost extra. Parking space(s), air conditioning, and extra storage space may or may not be included with an apartment. Rental leases often limit the maximum number of residents in each apartment.

On or around the ground floor of the apartment building, a series of mailboxes are typically kept in a location accessible to the public and, thus, to the mail carrier. Every unit typically gets its own mailbox with individual keys to it. Some very large apartment buildings with a full-time staff may take mail from the carrier and provide mail-sorting service. Near the mailboxes or some other location accessible by outsiders, a buzzer (equivalent to a doorbell) may be available for each individual unit. In smaller apartment buildings such as two- or three-flats, or even four-flats, rubbish is often disposed of in trash containers similar to those used at houses. In larger buildings, rubbish is often collected in a common trash bin or dumpster. For cleanliness or minimizing noise, many lessors will place restrictions on tenants regarding smoking or keeping pets in an apartment.

=== Various ===
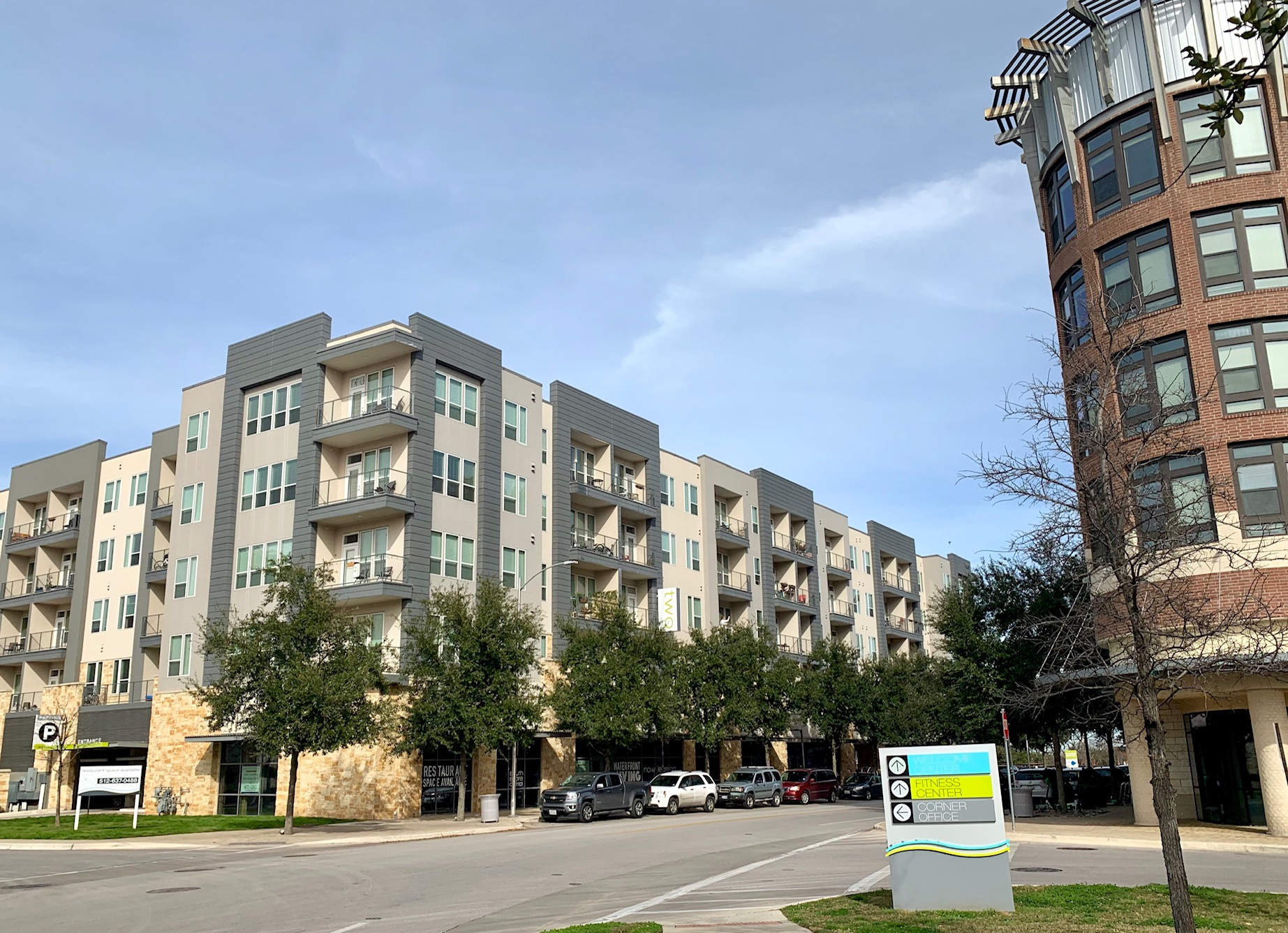
Mid-rise one-plus-five style apartment buildings in Austin, Texas

In more urban areas, apartments close to the downtown (British English town- or city-centre area) have the benefits of proximity to jobs and/or public transportation. However prices per square foot/meter are often much higher than in suburban areas.

Moving up in size from studio flats are one-bedroom apartments, which contain a bedroom enclosed from the other rooms of the apartment, usually by an internal door. This is followed by two-bedroom, three-bedroom, etc. Apartments with more than three bedrooms are rare.

Red Tail Crossing apartment building in Westchester, Los Angeles (2026)

Small apartments often have only one entrance. Large apartments often have two entrances, perhaps a door in the front and another in the back, or from an underground or otherwise attached parking structure. Depending on the building design, the entrance doors may be connected directly to the outside or to a common area inside, such as a hallway or a lobby.

In many American cities, the one-plus-five style of mid-rise, wood-framed apartments have gained significant popularity following a 2009 revision to the International Building Code; these buildings typically feature four wood-framed floors above a concrete podium and are popular with developers due to their high density and relatively lower construction costs.

== Historical examples ==
=== Pre-Columbian Americas ===
The Puebloan peoples of what is now the Southwestern United States have constructed large, multi-room dwellings, some comprising more than 900 rooms, since the 10th century.

In the Classic Period Mesoamerican city of Teotihuacan, apartments were not only the standard means of housing the city's population of over 200,000 inhabitants, but show a remarkably even wealth distribution for the entire city, even by contemporary standards. Furthermore, the apartments were inhabited by the general populace as a whole, in contrast to other Pre-Modern societies, where apartments were limited to housing the lower class members of the society, as with the somewhat contemporary Roman insulae.

=== Ancient Rome ===
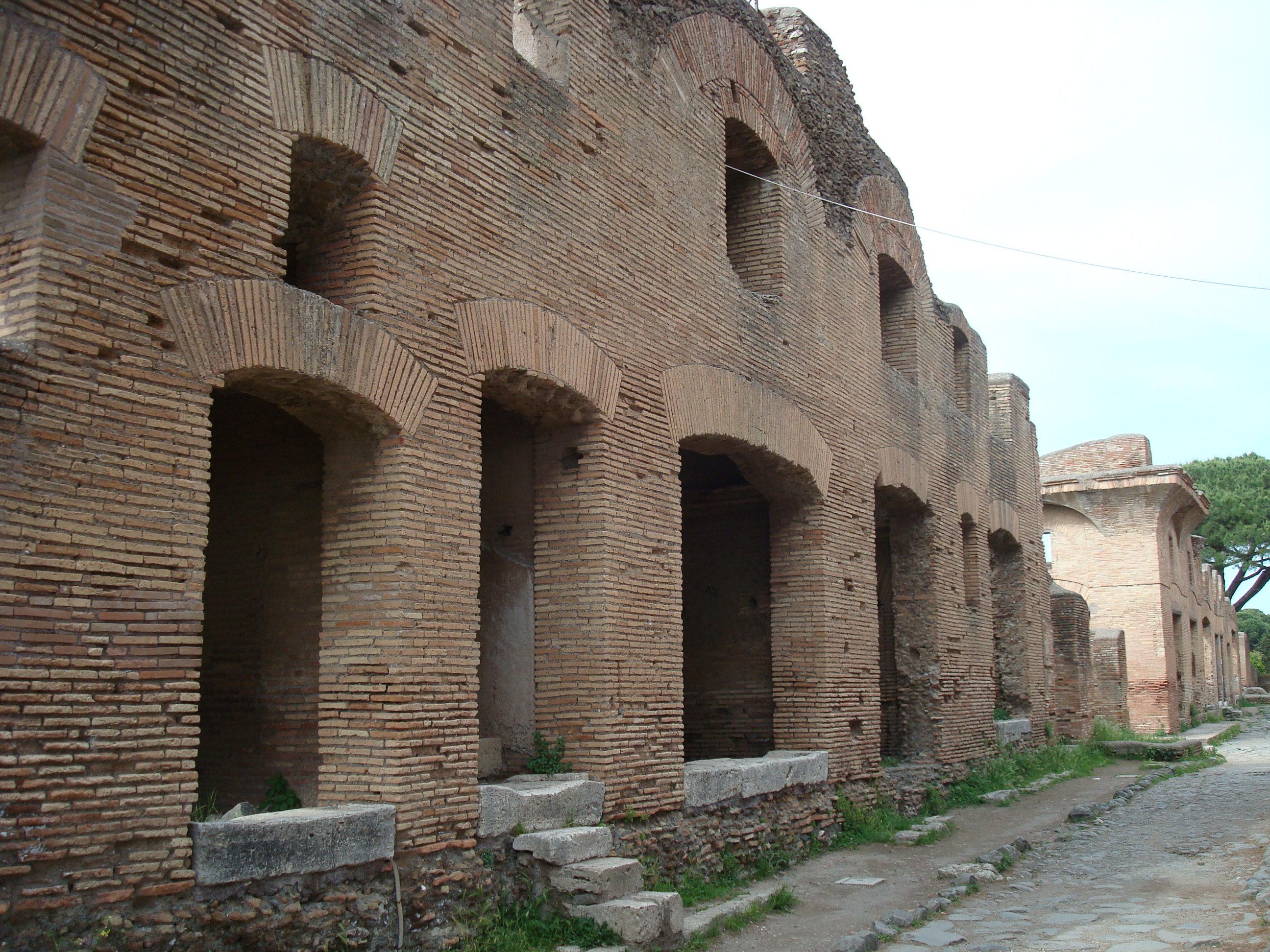
Remains of an Ancient Roman apartment block from the early 2nd century AD in Ostia, the port of Rome

In ancient Rome, the insulae (singular insula) were large apartment buildings where the lower and middle classes of Romans dwelled. The floor at ground level was used for tabernae, shops and businesses, with living space on the higher floors. Insulae in Rome and other imperial cities reached up to ten or more stories, some with more than 200 stairs. Several emperors, beginning with Augustus (r. 30 BC – 14 AD), attempted to establish limits of 20–25 m for multi-story buildings, but met with only limited success. The lower floors were typically occupied by either shops or wealthy families, while the upper stories were rented out to the lower classes. Surviving Oxyrhynchus Papyri indicate that seven-story buildings even existed in provincial towns, such as in 3rd century Hermopolis in Roman Egypt.

=== Ancient and medieval Egypt ===
During the medieval Arabic-Islamic period, the Egyptian capital of Fustat (Old Cairo) housed many high-rise residential buildings, some seven stories tall that could reportedly accommodate hundreds of people. In the 10th century, Al-Muqaddasi described them as resembling minarets, and stated that the majority of Fustat's population lived in these multi-story apartment buildings, each one housing more than 200 people. In the 11th century, Nasir Khusraw described some of these apartment buildings rising up to fourteen stories, with roof gardens on the top story complete with ox-drawn water wheels for irrigating them.

By the 16th century, the current Cairo also had high-rise apartment buildings, in which the two lower floors were for commercial and storage purposes and the multiple stories above them were rented out to tenants.

=== Yemen ===
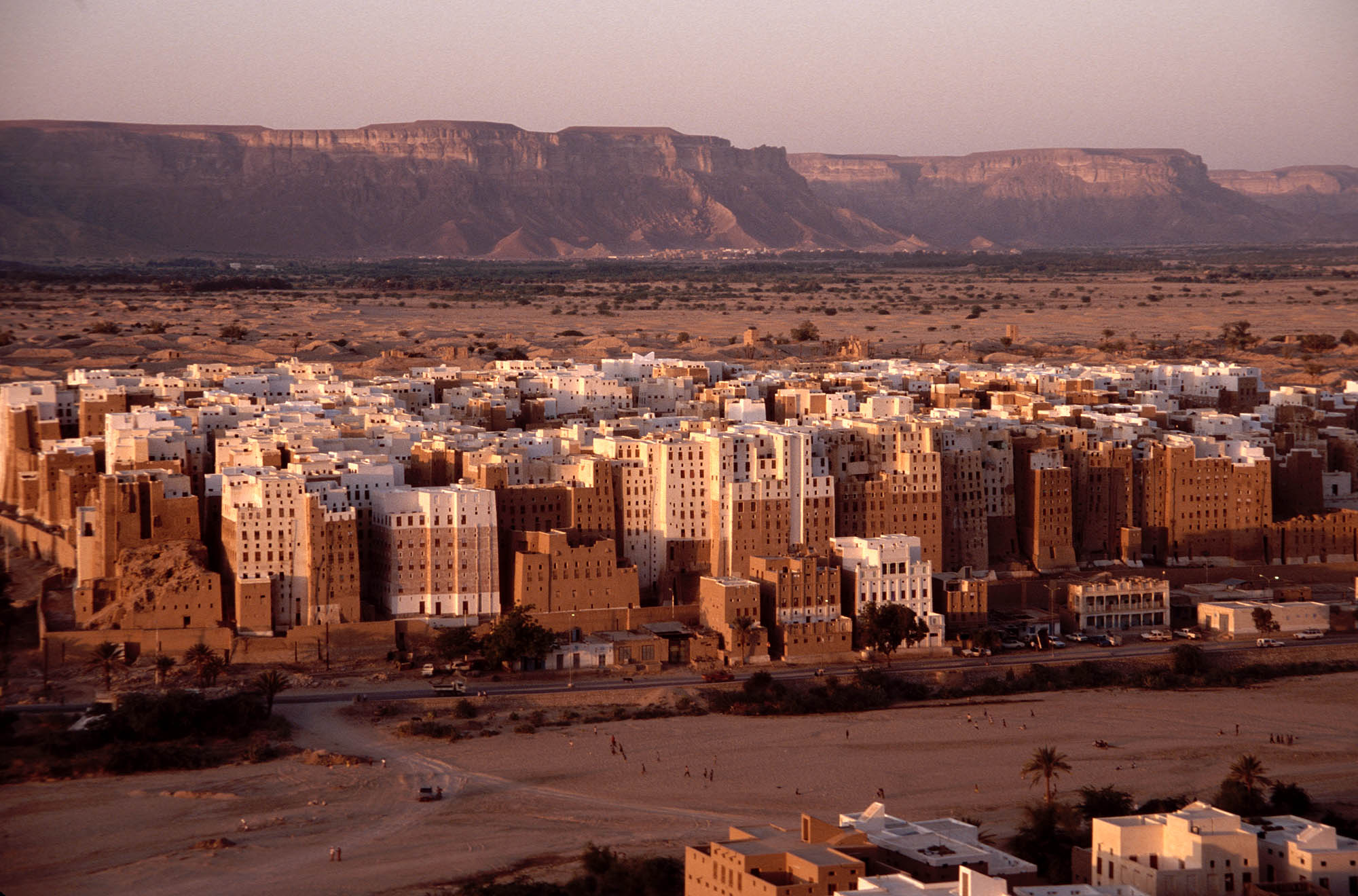
Mudbrick-made tower houses in Shibam, Wadi Hadhramaut, Yemen

High-rise apartment buildings were built in the Yemeni city of Shibam in the 16th century. The houses of Shibam are all made out of mud bricks, but about 500 of them are tower houses, which rise 5 to 11 stories high, with each floor having one or two apartments. Shibam has been called "Manhattan of the desert". Some of them were over 100 feet (30 m) high, thus being the tallest mudbrick apartment buildings in the world to this day.

=== Ancient China ===
The Hakka people in southern China adopted communal living structures designed to be easily defensible, in the form of Weilongwu (围龙屋) and Tulou (土楼). The latter are large, enclosed and fortified earth buildings, between three and five stories high and housing up to eighty families.

== Current examples ==
=== England ===
In London, by the time of the 2011 census, 52 percent of all homes were flats. Many of these were built as Georgian or Victorian houses and subsequently divided up, and many others were built as council flats. Many tower blocks were built after the Second World War. A number of these have been demolished and replaced with low-rise buildings or housing estates.

In the late 19th and early 20th centuries, the concept of the flat was slow to catch on amongst the British middle classes, which generally followed the north European standard of single-family houses dating far back into history. Those who lived in flats were assumed to be lower class and somewhat itinerant, renting for example a "flat above a shop" as part of a lease agreement for a tradesman. In London and most of Britain, everyone who could afford to do so occupied an entire house—even if this was a small terraced house—while the working poor continued to rent rooms in often overcrowded properties, with one (or more) families per room.

During the last quarter of the 19th century, as wealth increased, ideas began to change. Both urban growth and the increase in population meant that more imaginative housing concepts would be needed if the middle and upper classes were to maintain a pied-à-terre in the capital. The traditional London town house was becoming increasingly expensive to maintain. For bachelors and unmarried women in particular, the idea of renting a modern mansion flat became increasingly popular.

The first mansion flats in England were:

- Albert Mansions, which Philip Flower constructed and James Knowles designed. These flats were constructed between 1867 and 1870, and were one of the earliest blocks of flats to fill the vacant spaces of the newly-laid out Victoria Street at the end of the 1860s. Today, only a sliver of the building remains, next to the Victoria Palace Theatre. Albert Mansions was really 19 separate "houses", each with a staircase serving one flat per floor. Its tenants included Sir Arthur Sullivan and Lord Alfred Tennyson, whose connections with the developer's family were long-standing. Philip Flower's son, Cyril Flower, developed most of the mansion blocks on Prince of Wales Drive, London.
- Albert Hall Mansions, designed by Richard Norman Shaw in 1876. Because this was a new type of housing, Shaw reduced risks as much as possible; each block was planned as a separate project, with the building of each part contingent on the successful occupation of every flat in the previous block. The gamble paid off and was a success.

=== Scotland ===
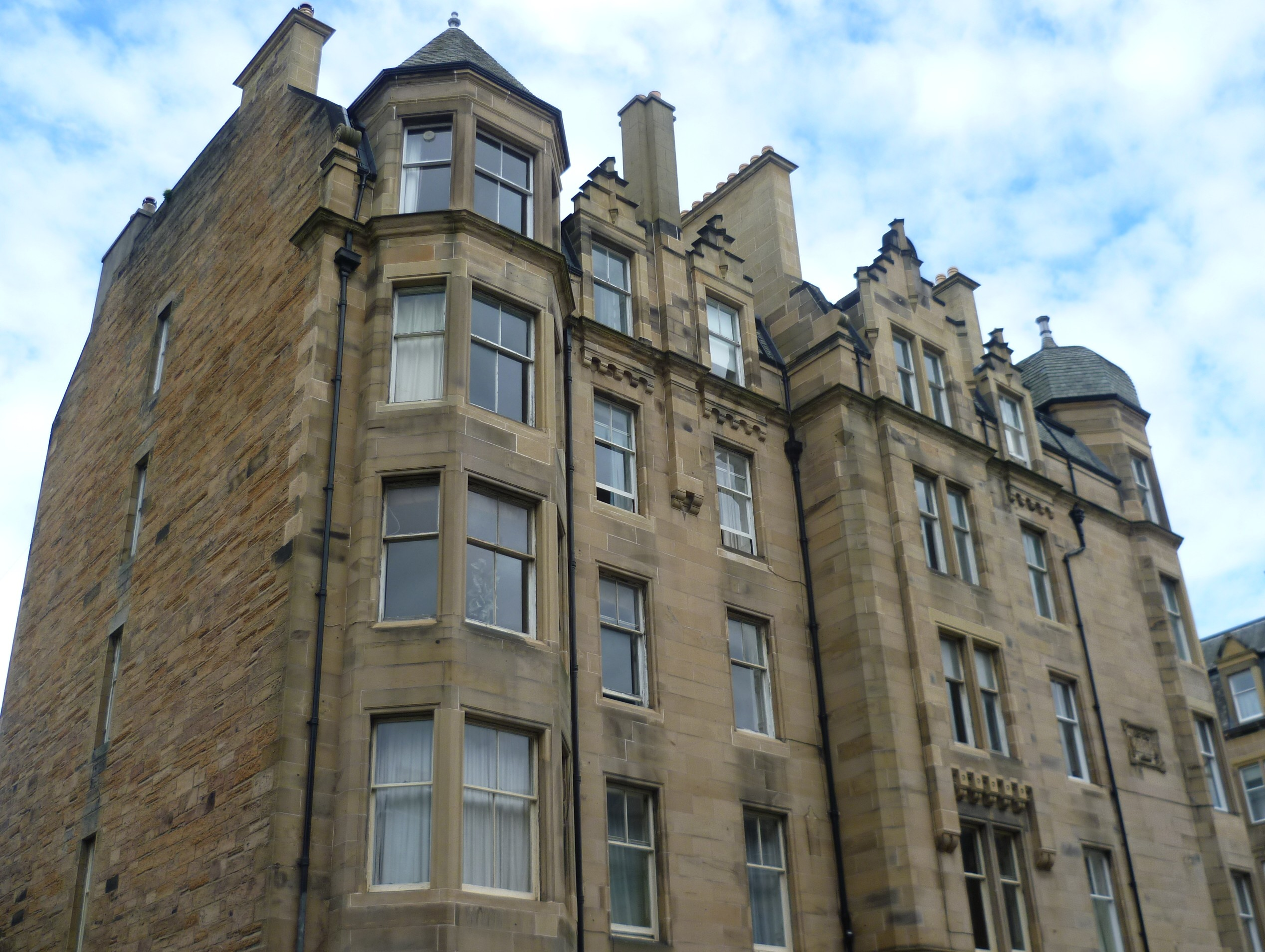
Tenement in Edinburgh, Scotland (1893)

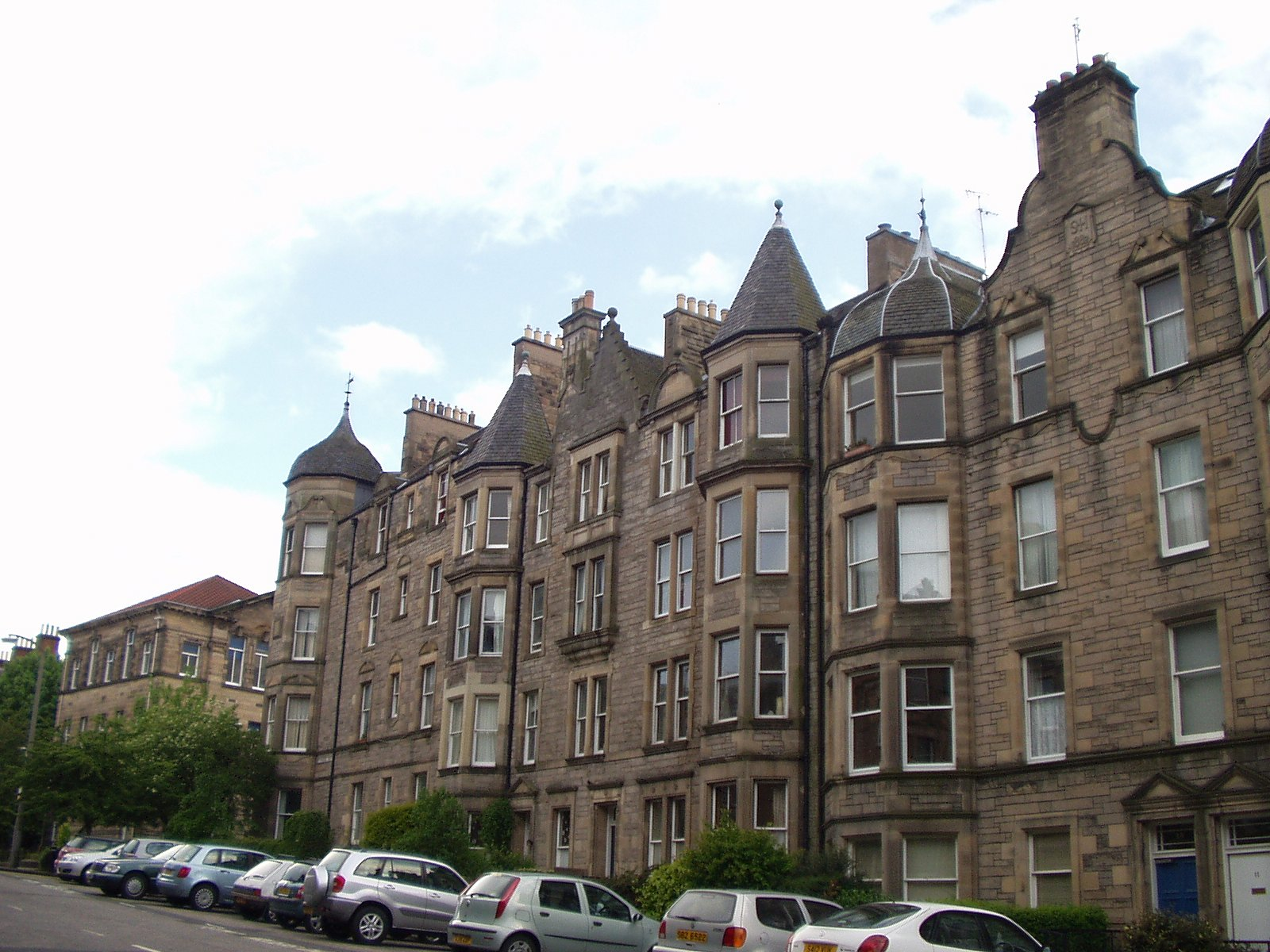
Tenement in Marchmont, Edinburgh, built in 1882

In Scotland, the term "tenement" lacks the pejorative connotations it carries elsewhere and refers simply to any block of flats sharing a common central staircase and lacking an elevator, particularly those constructed before 1919. The staircase is informally called a "close" after the historic word for an alleyway.

Tenements were, and continue to be, inhabited by a wide range of social classes and income groups. Tenements today are bought by a wide range of social types, including young professionals, older retirees, and by absentee landlords, often for rental to students after they leave halls of residence managed by their institution. The Tenement House is a historic house museum operated by the National Trust for Scotland which offers an insight into the lifestyle of tenement dwellers as it was generations ago.

During the 19th century, tenements became the predominant type of new housing in Scotland's industrial cities, although they were very common in the Old Town in Edinburgh from the 15th century, where they reached ten or eleven stories and in one case fourteen stories. Built of sandstone or granite, Scottish tenements are usually three to five stories in height, with two to four flats on each floor. (In contrast, industrial cities in England tended to favour "back-to-back" terraces of brick.) Scottish tenements are constructed in terraces, and each entrance within a block is referred to as a close or stair—both referring to the shared passageway to the individual flats. Flights of stairs and landings are generally designated common areas, and residents traditionally took turns to sweep clean the floors and, in Aberdeen in particular, took turns to make use of shared laundry facilities in the "back green" (garden or yard). It is now more common for cleaning of the common ways to be contracted out through a managing agent or "factor".

In Glasgow, where Scotland's highest concentration of tenement dwellings can be found, the urban renewal projects of the 1950s, 1960s and 1970s brought an end to the city's slums, which had primarily consisted of older tenements built in the early 19th century in which large extended families would live together in cramped conditions. They were replaced by high-rise blocks that, within a couple of decades, became notorious for crime and poverty. The Glasgow Corporation made many efforts to improve the situation, most successfully with the City Improvement Trust, which cleared the slums of the old town, replacing them with what they thought of as a traditional high street, which remains an imposing townscape. (The City Halls and the Cleland Testimonial were part of this scheme.) National government help was given following World War I when Housing Acts sought to provide "homes fit for heroes". Garden suburb areas, based on English models, such as Knightswood, were set up. These proved too expensive, so a modern tenement, three stories high, slate roofed and built of reconstituted stone, was re-introduced and a slum clearance program initiated to clear areas such as the Calton and the Garngad.

After World War II, more ambitious plans, known as the Bruce Plan, were made for the complete evacuation of slums for modern mid-rise housing developments on the outskirts of the city. However, the central government refused to fund the plans, preferring instead to depopulate the city to a series of New Towns. Again, economic considerations meant that many of the planned "New Town" amenities were never built in these areas. These housing estates, known as "schemes", came therefore to be widely regarded as unsuccessful; many, such as Castlemilk, were just dormitories well away from the center of the city with no amenities, such as shops and public houses ("deserts with windows", as Billy Connolly once put it). High-rise living too started off with bright ambition—the Moss Heights, built in the 1950s, are still desirable—but fell prey to later economic pressure. Many of the later tower blocks were poorly designed and cheaply built and their anonymity caused some social problems. The demolition of the tower blocks in order to build modern housing schemes has in some cases led to a re-interpretations of the tenement.

In 1970, a team from Strathclyde University demonstrated that the old tenements had been basically sound, and could be given new life with replumbing providing modern kitchens and bathrooms. The Corporation acted on this principle for the first time in 1973 at the Old Swan Corner, Pollokshaws. Thereafter, Housing Action Areas were set up to renovate so-called slums. Later, privately owned tenements benefited from government help in "stone cleaning", revealing a honey-colored sandstone behind the presumed "grey" tenemental facades. The policy of tenement demolition is now considered to have been short-sighted, wasteful and largely unsuccessful. Many of Glasgow's worst tenements were refurbished into desirable accommodation in the 1970s and 1980s and the policy of demolition is considered to have destroyed fine examples of a "universally admired architectural" style. The Glasgow Housing Association took ownership of the public housing stock from the city council on 7 March 2003, and has begun a £96 million clearance and demolition program to clear and demolish many of the high-rise flats.

=== United States ===
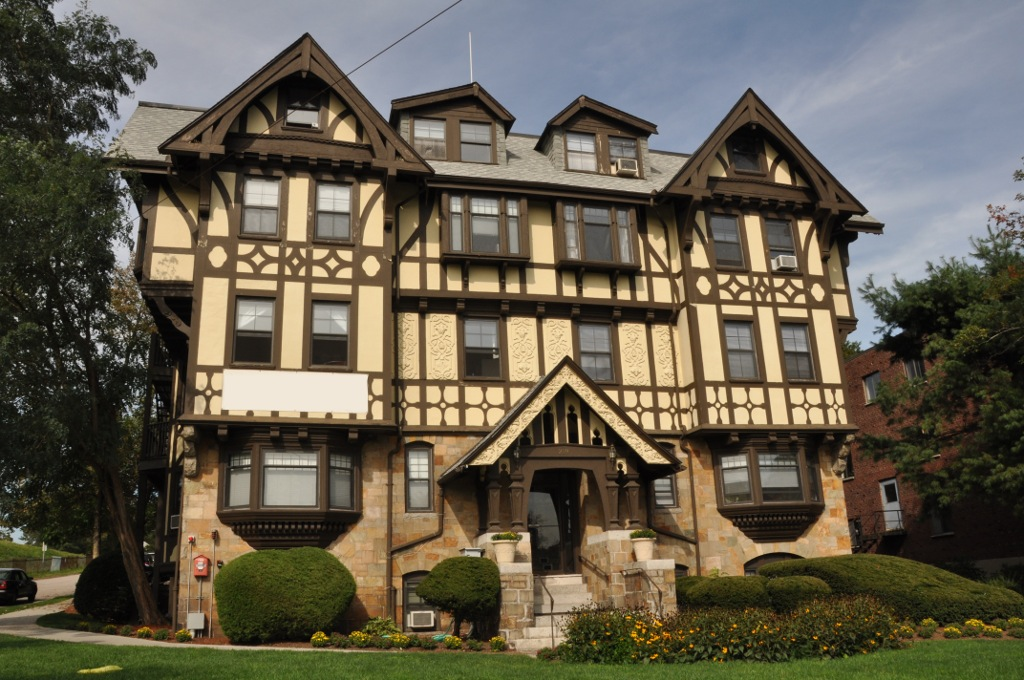
The Chestnut Hill, an 1899 apartment house in Newton, Massachusetts

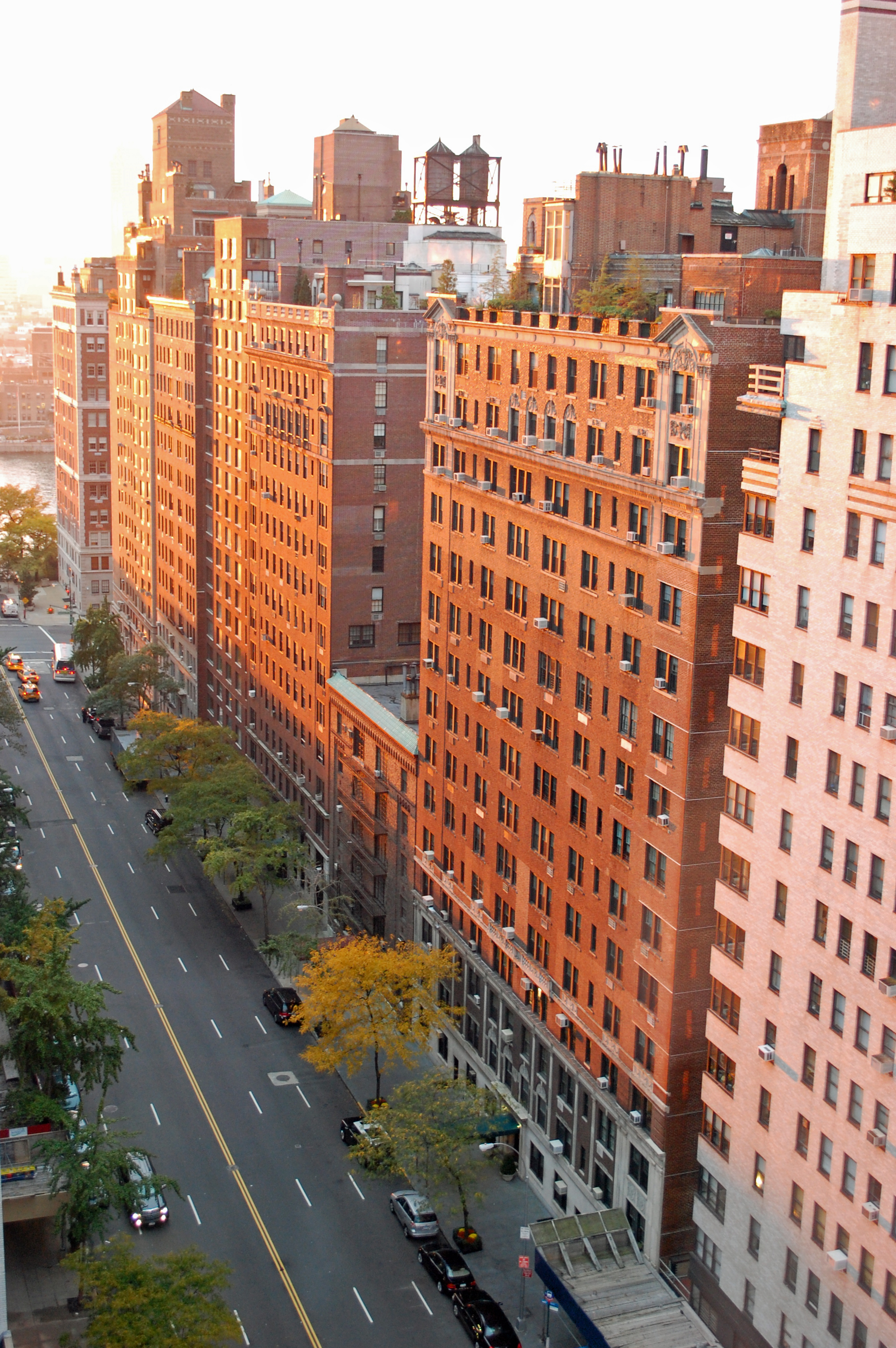
Apartment buildings lining the residential stretch of East 57th Street between First Avenue and Sutton Place in New York

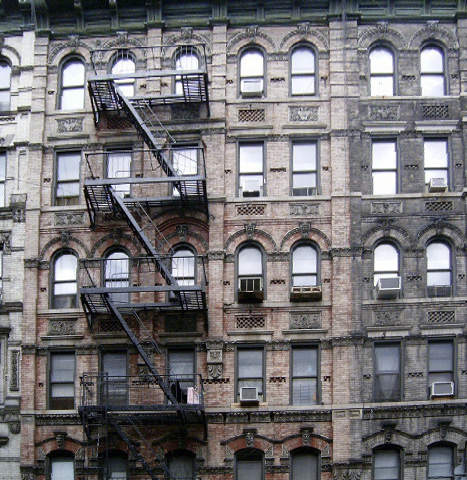
Tenement buildings in Manhattan's Lower East Side

In 1839, the first New York City tenement was built, and soon they became breeding grounds for outlaws, juvenile delinquents, and organized crime. Tenements, or their slum landlords, were also known for their price gouging rent. How the Other Half Lives notes one tenement district:

Blind Man's Alley bear its name for a reason. Until little more than a year ago its dark burrows harbored a colony of blind beggars, tenants of a blind landlord, old Daniel Murphy, whom every child in the ward knows, if he never heard of the President of the United States. "Old Dan" made a big fortune—he told me once four hundred thousand dollars—out of his alley and the surrounding tenements, only to grow blind himself in extreme old age, sharing in the end the chief hardship of the wretched beings whose lot he had stubbornly refused to better that he might increase his wealth. Even when the Board of Health at last compelled him to repair and clean up the worst of the old buildings, under threat of driving out the tenants and locking the doors behind them, the work was accomplished against the old man's angry protests. He appeared in person before the Board to argue his case, and his argument was characteristic. "I have made my will," he said. "My monument stands waiting for me in Calvary. I stand on the very brink of the grave, blind and helpless, and now (here the pathos of the appeal was swept under in a burst of angry indignation) do you want me to build and get skinned, skinned? These people are not fit to live in a nice house. Let them go where they can, and let my house stand." In spite of the genuine anguish of the appeal, it was downright amusing to find that his anger was provoked less by the anticipated waste of luxury on his tenants than by distrust of his own kind, the builder. He knew intuitively what to expect. The result showed that Mr. Murphy had gauged his tenants correctly.

Many campaigners, such as Upton Sinclair and Jacob Riis, pushed for reforms in tenement dwellings. As a result, the New York State Tenement House Act was passed in 1901 to improve the conditions. More improvements followed. In 1949, President Harry S. Truman signed the Housing Act of 1949 to clean slums and reconstruct housing units for the poor.

The Dakota (1884) was one of the first luxury apartment buildings in New York City. The majority, however, remained tenements.

In the United States, "tenement" is a label usually applied to the less expensive, more basic rental apartment buildings in older sections of large cities. Many of these apartment buildings are "walk-ups" without an elevator, and some have shared bathing facilities, though this is becoming less common. The slang term "dingbat" is used to describe cheap urban apartment buildings from the 1950s and 1960s with unique and often wacky façades to differentiate themselves within a full block of apartments. They are often built on stilts, and with parking underneath.

Nationwide, apartments have been part of American urban and suburban developments since their emergence. Apartment living spread rapidly in the late 19th century. Industrial hubs like Chicago and Boston popularized brick "two-flats" and elegant multi-family "French flats," while Spanish-style courtyard apartments flourished across Southern California to maximize natural light and cross-ventilation. Smaller cities like Omaha, Nebraska, Denver, Colorado, and Louisville, Kentucky relied on apartments to meet their expanding residential needs from the 1860s onward, continuing today.

After World War II, U.S. growth reshaped multi-family housing across the Sunbelt and western states. Developers built low-rise garden apartments and sprawling complexes centered on swimming pools, designed to accommodate a mobile, car-dependent post-war workforce. Some significant developments in architectural design of apartment buildings came out of the 1950s and 1960s. Among them were groundbreaking designs in Chicago, including the 860-880 Lake Shore Drive Apartments (1951), Marina City (1964) and Lake Point Tower (1968).

By the late 20th century, urban renewal sparked widespread warehouse and industrial loft conversions across Midwestern and West Coast downtowns. Modern multi-family housing across U.S. metros is largely defined by transit-oriented developments and dense, mixed-use infill construction. Apartments continue to anchor housing developments across the entire nation.

=== Canada ===
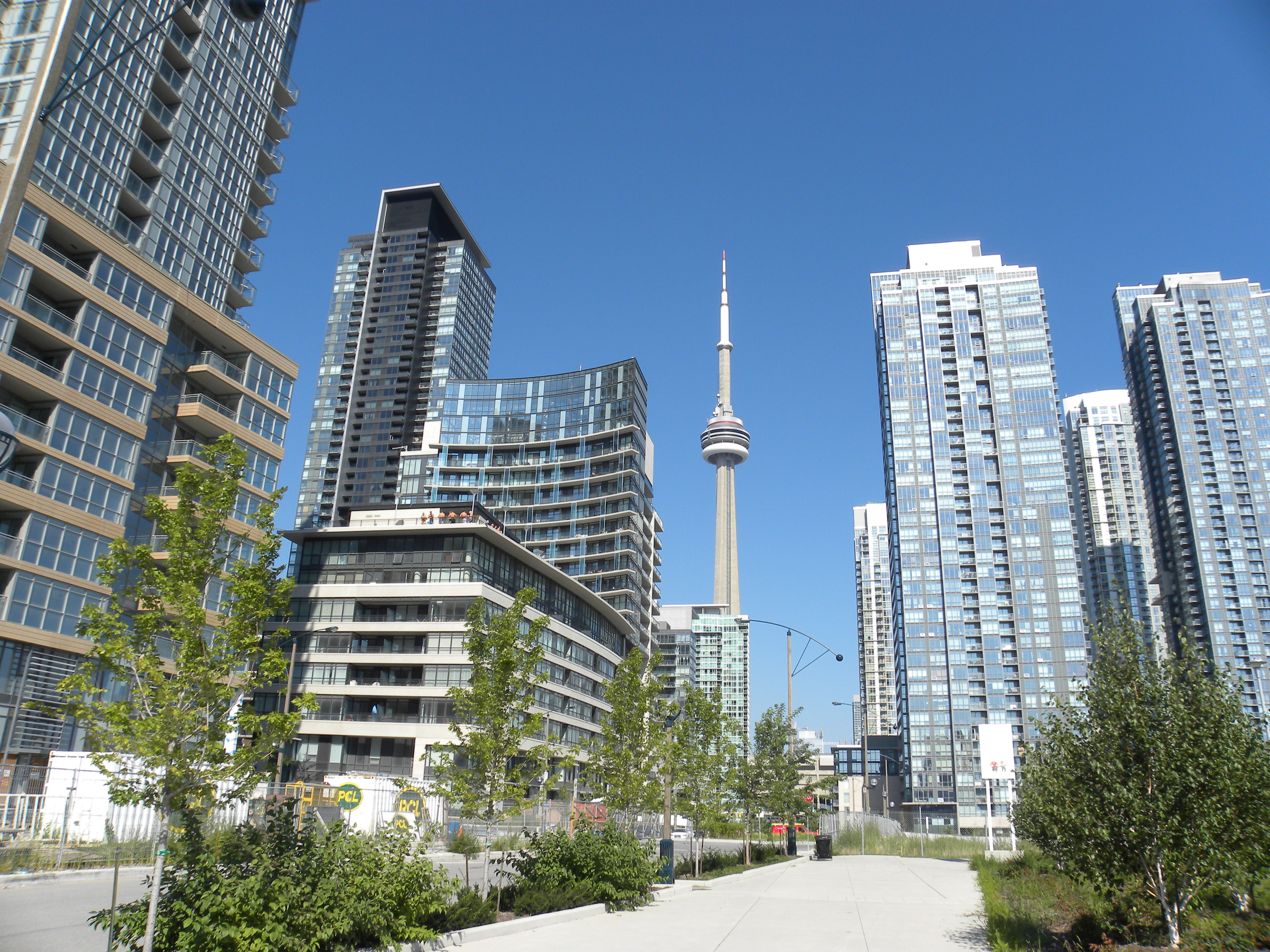
New condominiums in downtown Toronto

At the end of the 19th century, purpose-built apartment buildings started appearing in Canada. Cramming into packed tenements long before that, deliberately planned, self-contained residential suites were essentially unheard of across the country until the 1890s. In 1891, Montreal became the first city in Canada with apartments when a four-storey block went up at Crescent and Sherbrooke Streets. It was designed for well-off tenants and featured dumbwaiters meant to ferry hot meals directly up into suites from a central basement kitchen because its developer believed private household kitchens were obsolete. By 1900, Montreal had added buildings like the red-brick Marlborough Apartments on Milton Street. Toronto followed with its first true apartment block in 1904 when the St. George Mansions opened. Right behind it came the Alexandra Palace on University Avenue. With other Canadian cities ballooning in the early 1900s, places like Winnipeg, Calgary, and Vancouver saw their own first waves apartments between 1905 and 1912.

Apartments continued to be popular across Canada, particularly in urban centers like Vancouver, Toronto, Ottawa, Montreal, and Hamilton in the 1950s to 1970s. By the 1980s, many multi-unit buildings were being constructed as condominiums instead of apartments—both are now very common. In Toronto and Vancouver, high-rise apartments and condominiums have been spread around the city, giving even the major suburbs a skyline. The robustness of the condo markets in Toronto and Vancouver are based on the lack of land availability. The average capitalization rate in the Greater Toronto Area for Q3 2015 hit its lowest level in 30 years: in Q3 2015 it stood at 3.75 per cent, down from 4.2 per cent in Q2 2015 and down almost 50 per cent from the 6.3 per cent posted in Q3 2010.

=== Australia ===
Apartment buildings in Australia are typically managed by a body corporate in which owners pay a monthly fee to provide for maintenance of common premises. Many apartments are owned through strata title. Australian legislation enforces a minimum 2.4 m floor-ceiling height which differentiates apartment buildings from office buildings.

Australia has a relatively recent history in apartment buildings. Terrace houses were the early response to density development, though the majority of Australians lived in fully detached houses. Apartments of any kind were legislated against in the Parliament of Queensland as part of the Undue Subdivision of Land Prevention Act 1885.

The earliest apartment buildings were in the major cities of Sydney and Melbourne as the response to fast rising land values–both cities are home to the two oldest surviving apartment buildings in the country, Kingsclere in Potts Point, and The Canterbury Flats in St Kilda. Melbourne Mansions on Collins Street, Melbourne (now demolished), built in 1906 for mostly wealthy residents is believed by many to be the earliest. Today the oldest surviving self-contained apartment buildings are in the St Kilda area including the Fawkner Mansions (1910), Majestic Mansions (1912 as a boarding house) and the Canterbury (1914—the oldest surviving buildings contained flats). Kingsclere, built in 1912 is believed to be the earliest apartment building in Sydney and still survives.

During the interwar years, apartment building continued in inner Melbourne (particularly in areas such as St Kilda and South Yarra), Sydney (particularly in areas such as Potts Point, Darlinghust and Kings Cross) and in Brisbane (in areas such as New Farm, Fortitude Valley and Spring Hill).

Post–World War II, with the Australian Dream apartment buildings went out of vogue and flats were seen as accommodation only for the poor. Walk-up flats (without a lift) of two to three stories however were common in the middle suburbs of cities for lower income groups. The main exceptions were Sydney and the Gold Coast, Queensland where apartment development continued for more than half a century. In Sydney a limited geography and highly sought after waterfront views (Sydney Harbour and beaches such as Bondi) made apartment living socially acceptable. Since the 1960s, these cities maintained much higher population densities than the rest of Australia through the acceptance of apartment buildings.

In other cities, apartment building was almost solely restricted to public housing. Public housing in Australia was common in the larger cities, particularly in Melbourne (by the Housing Commission of Victoria) where a number of high-rise housing commission flats were built between the 1950s and 1970s by successive governments as part of an urban renewal program. Areas affected included Fitzroy, Flemington, Collingwood, Carlton, Richmond and Prahran. Similar projects were run in Sydney's lower socioeconomic areas like Redfern.

In the 1980s, modern apartment buildings sprang up in riverside locations in Brisbane (along the Brisbane River) and Perth (along the Swan River).

In Melbourne, in the 1990s, a trend began for apartment buildings without the requirement of spectacular views. As a continuation of the gentrification of the inner city, a fashion became New York "loft" style apartments (see above) and a large stock of old warehouses and old abandoned office buildings in and around the central business district became the target of developers. The trend of adaptive reuse extended to conversion of old churches and schools. Similar warehouse conversions and gentrification began in Brisbane suburbs such as Teneriffe, Queensland and Fortitude Valley and in Sydney in areas such as Ultimo. As the supply of buildings for conversion ran out, reproduction and modern high-rise apartments followed. This was particularly the case in Melbourne thanks to official planning policies (Postcode 3000), making the CBD the fastest growing, population wise in the country. Apartment building in the Melbourne metropolitan area has also escalated with the advent of the Melbourne 2030 planning policy. Urban renewal areas like Docklands, Southbank, St Kilda Road and Port Melbourne are now predominantly apartments. There has also been a sharp increase in the number of student apartment buildings in areas such as Carlton in Melbourne.

Despite their size, other smaller cities including Canberra, Darwin, Townsville, Cairns, Newcastle, Wollongong, Adelaide and Geelong have begun building apartments in the 2000s.

Today, residential buildings such as the Eureka Tower and Q1 are among the tallest in the country.

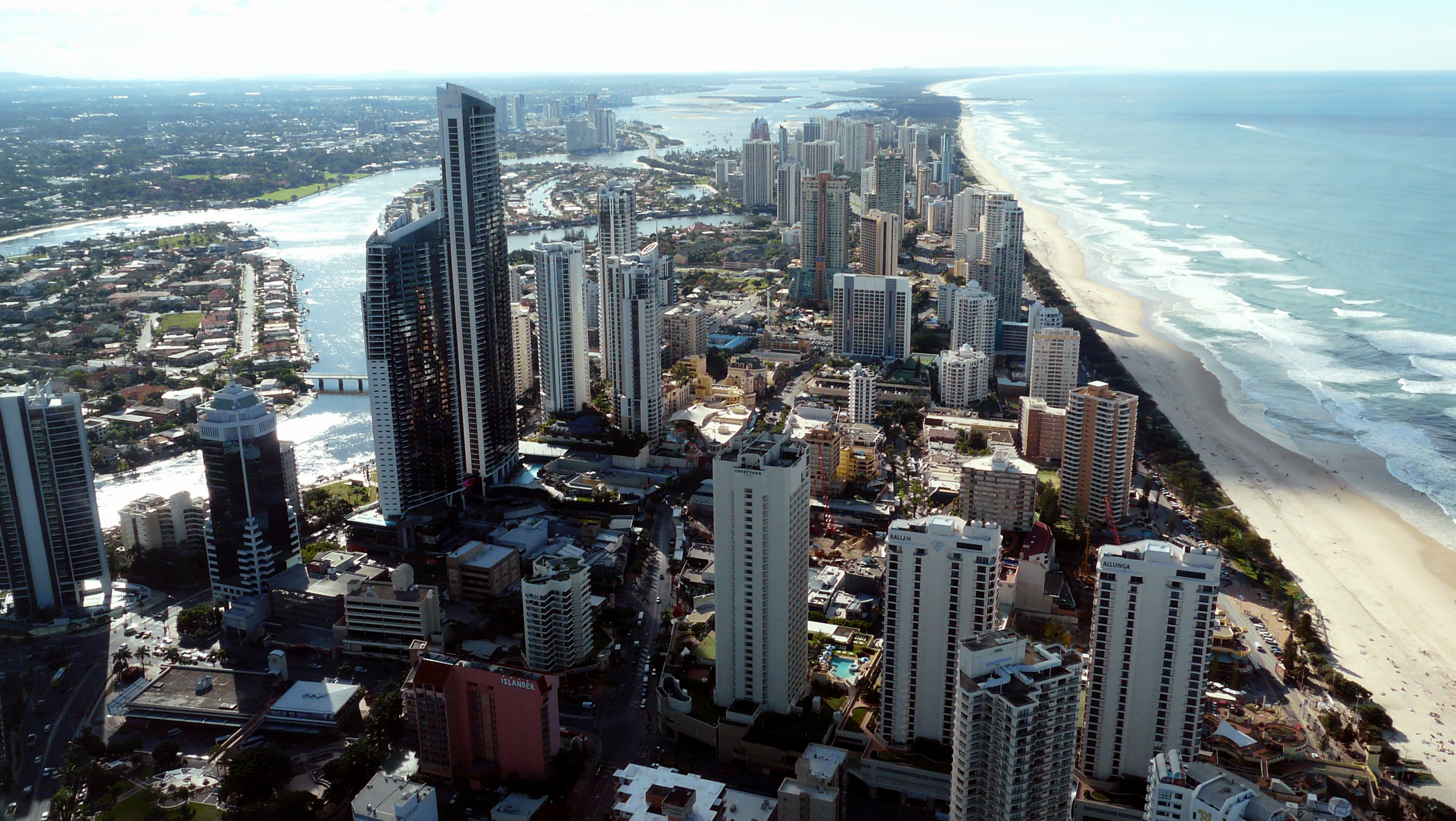
The skyline of the Gold Coast in Queensland is dominated by apartments.

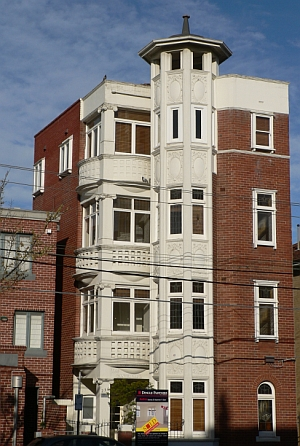
The Canterbury in St Kilda, Victoria is one of the earliest surviving apartment buildings in Australia.

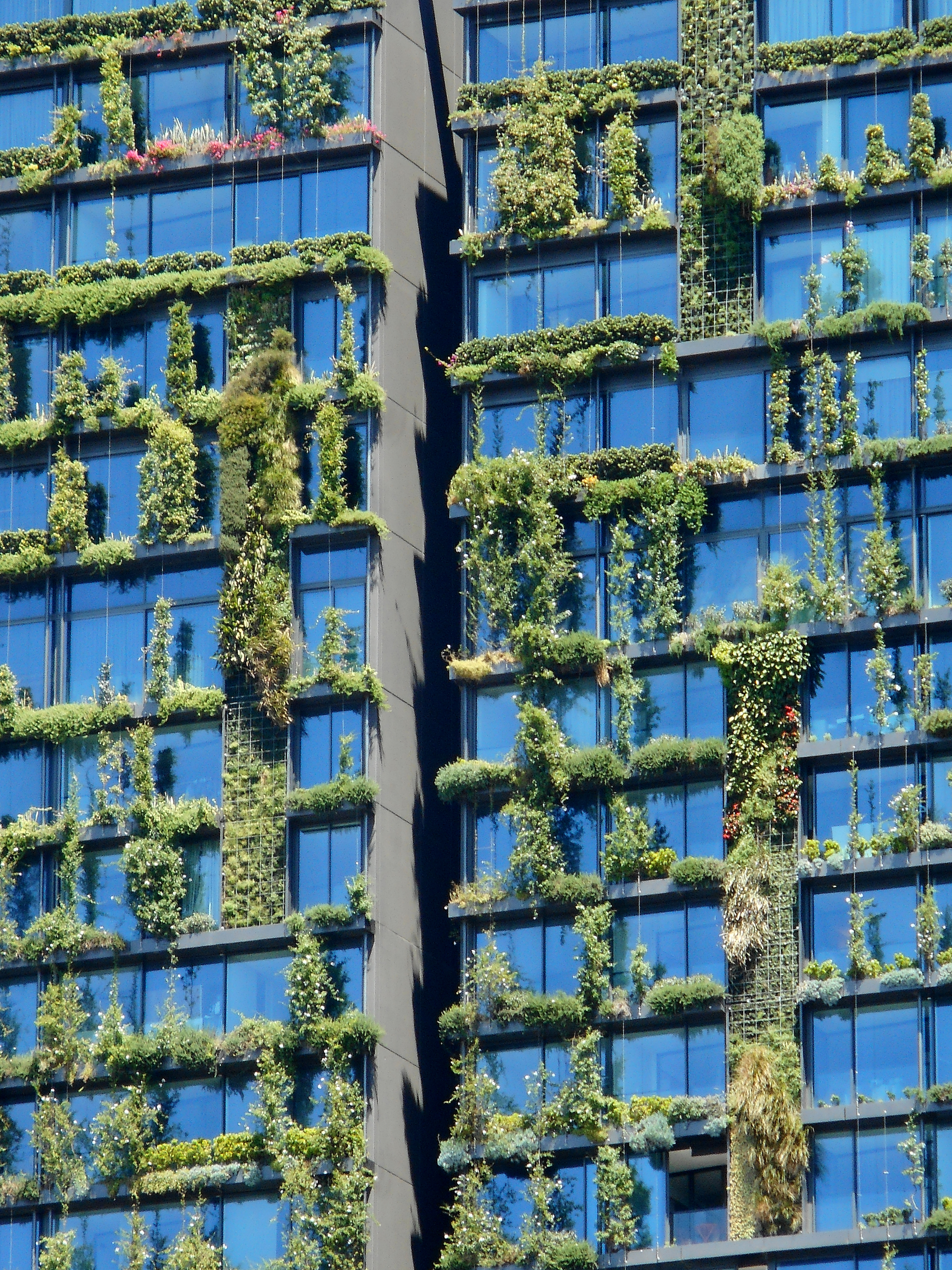
One Central Park, Sydney, which features vertical hanging gardens and sustainable green design

=== South Korea ===
As of 2019, a majority of Koreans live in apartments. Since the 1980s, the number of apartment residents has soared, and as the number of apartments has steadily increased, apartments have become a representative form of residence where more than half of the Korean population resides.

It is the most common house in small and medium-sized cities in Korea, and even these days, apartments are quite visible in rural areas such as remote areas. This is because small and medium-sized construction companies have technology, but they lack the capital to build large complexes in large cities. The better the location, the more expensive the apartment is, and the more expensive the apartment complex built by a large construction company and with a large number of households. Also, even the same type of flat in the same complex is not all of the same price. Due to problems such as the right to sunlight and prospects, the low-rise households on the first and third floors are generally the cheapest, and the higher they go, the more expensive they become. In addition, the price varies depending on other conditions such as the viewing area and the direction of the house, such as south, east, west, and north. The upper floors with a south-facing view are the most expensive. Apartment sales and lease prices are actually the largest and most stable assets owned by a middle-class family in Korea, symbolizing the social status of a family, which forms a class and determines life satisfaction. For this reason, the Korean people have no choice but to react very sensitively to apartment prices.

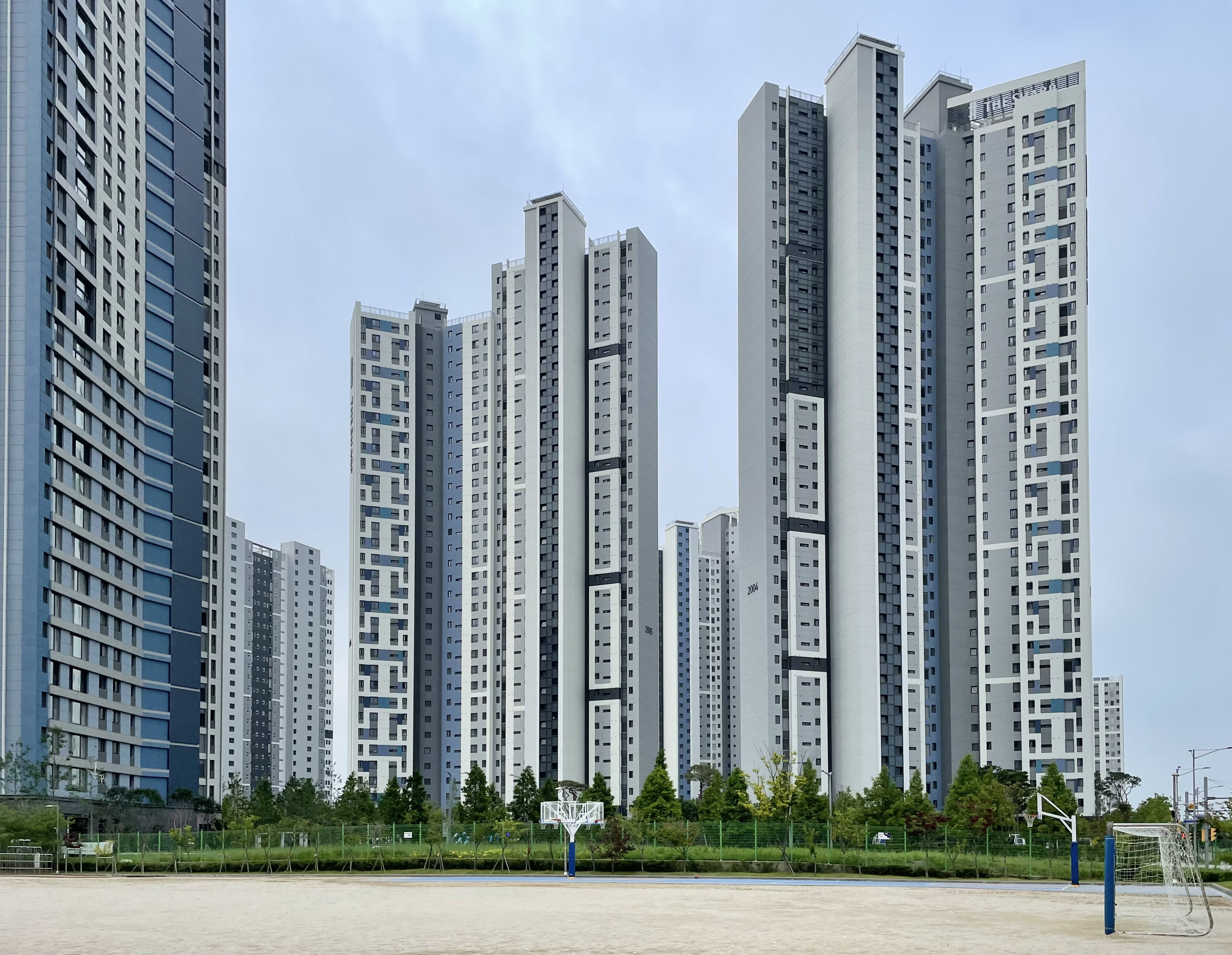
An apartment in Songdo International City, Incheon

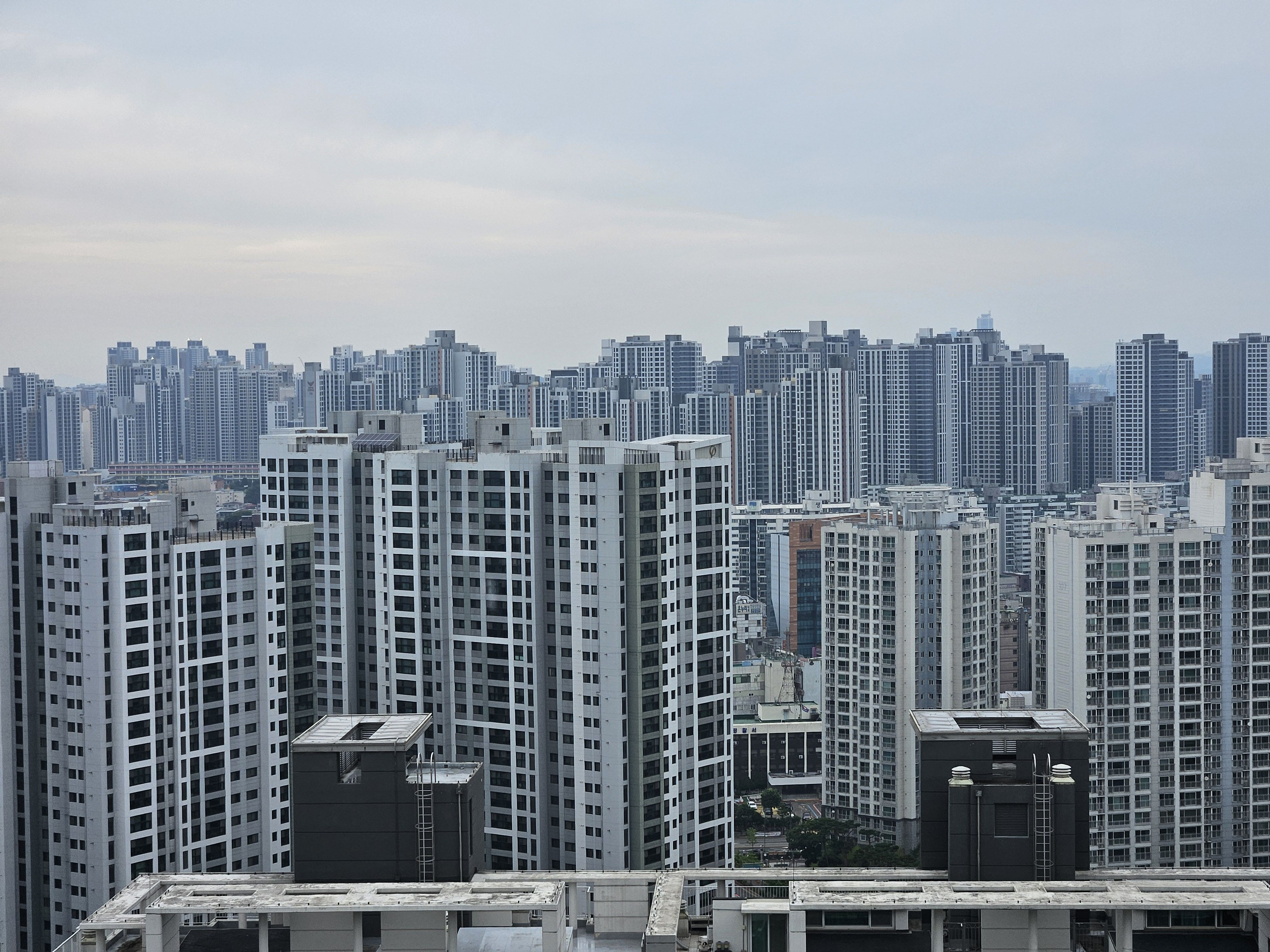
A landscape lined with large apartment complexes (Gwangmyeong City)

== See also ==
- Condominium
- Kamienica in Poland
- List of house types
- Polykatoikia in Greece
