= William Flakefield =

William Flakefield (fl. 1700), was the first weaver of checked linen in Great Britain.

== Origins ==
Flakefield was, it is said, son of a native (named Wilson) of Flakefield, in the parish of East Kilbride, Lanarkshire, who became a merchant in Glasgow about 1650. He was called Flakefield in order to distinguish him from another merchant named Wilson. However this may be, Richard Fleckfield was deacon of the incorporation of weavers of Glasgow in 1640, John Fleckfield in 1670, and Robert Fleckfield in 1673, 1675, and 1676 (James Cleland, Annals of Glasgow, p. 425). William Flakefield may probably have been the son of John or Robert Fleckfield.

== Military service ==
After having learned the art of weaving, he enlisted about 1670 in the Cameronian regiment; from this he was afterwards transferred to the Scots guards. While on service abroad he came across a blue and white check handkerchief of German make. He resolved immediately to imitate it when he returned to Glasgow, and when he obtained his discharge in 1700 he carried out his intention.

== Checked linen ==
With some difficulty he got together the means for making a web of two dozen handkerchiefs. The novelty of the blue and white check and the unusual fineness of the texture made the article so popular that it was soon very largely manufactured in Glasgow and its neighbourhood. As late as 1771 striped and checkered linen cloth and handkerchiefs were among the most important textile manufactures of Glasgow. Probably in consequence of being outstripped by imitators with larger means of carrying on the new manufacture, Flakefield himself seems to have obtained no benefit from the success of his scheme, for in his old age he was made town-drummer of Glasgow, and died in that office.
