= Melbourne Mansions =

Demolished residential building in Melbourne, Victoria

- Interactive map of the Melbourne Mansions area

General information
- Architectural style: Federation architecture
- Location: Melbourne, Australia, 95 (91-101) Collins Street, Melbourne, Australia
- Coordinates: 37°48′52.17″S 144°58′14.25″E
- Completed: 1906
- Demolished: 1958
- Client: David Syme

Technical details
- Floor count: 5

Design and construction
- Architects: Walter Butler and George Inskip

Melbourne Mansions was a five-storey plus semi-basement apartment building located in Collins Street in Melbourne, Australia. Constructed in 1906, it was the first purpose-built residential apartment block in the city. Designed in the Federation Free Style by the architectural partnership of Walter Butler and George Inskip for newspaper proprietor David Syme, its facade featured prominent arched bays with inset raised first floor and balconies behind, with contrasting central and side bays of oriel windows, a top level of bow window and balconies, and a tall parapet. The basement and ground levels had medical rooms, while the floors above housed 25 apartments. Three types of apartments were originally available, including large suites with a kitchen and servants rooms, large and smaller ones with meals centrally supplied by service elevators, and others who relied on the ground level dining room.

The building was sold in 1949, and demolished in 1958 by Whelan the Wrecker, making way for the 26-storey CRA Building.
