= James Cleland (statistician) =

Scottish statistician and historical writer

James Cleland LLD (1770–1840) was Superintendent of Public Works in Glasgow but is remembered as a Scottish statistician and historical writer.

== Life ==
He was a native of Glasgow, and began life as a cabinet-maker, spending some in London. In 1803 he was made Bailie for the Gorbals area, and Bailie for the City in 1806. During his year as a Glasgow baillie in 1806–07, Cleland prepared a report on the structural problems of the Episcopal chapel, St Andrew's-by-the-Green. He was Treasurer for the city from 1808.

He obtained in 1814 the post of superintendent of public works in Glasgow. In 1819 he was employed by the municipal authorities in taking a census of Glasgow, the most ambitious in the United Kingdom. He was similarly employed in 1821 and 1831.

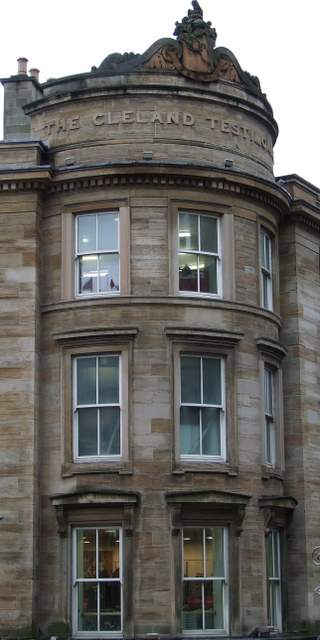
The "Cleland Testimonial" at the corner of Sauchiehall Street and Buchanan Street, Glasgow.

The "Cleland Testimonial" building in Buchanan Street, Glasgow, was designed by David Hamilton and was completed in 1836. James Cleland lived there at the end of his life. It is now a category B listed building.

He lived his final years at 130 West Nile Street in central Glasgow and died there in 1840.

== Works ==
Cleland published:

- Annals of Glasgow, Glasgow, 1816.
- Rise and Progress of the City of Glasgow, Glasgow, 1820.
- Enumeration of the Inhabitants of Glasgow, Glasgow, 1832.
- Historical Account of Bills of Mortality of the Probability of Human Life in Glasgow and other large towns, Glasgow, 1836.
- Description of the Banquet in honour of the Right Honourable Sir R. Peel, Lord Rector of the University of Glasgow, 13 Jan. 1837, Glasgow, 1837.
- Description of the City of Glasgow, Glasgow, 1843.

== Notes ==
Attribution

This article incorporates text from a publication now in the public domain: "Cleland, James". Dictionary of National Biography. London: Smith, Elder & Co. 1885–1900.
