= Dr. Stone season 3 =

2023 Japanese television season

Dr. Stone: New World
- Season 3
- Japanese cover art for the first home media box set of Dr. Stone: New World as released by Toho Animation
- No. of episodes: 22

Release
- Original network: Tokyo MX, KBS
- Original release: April 6 – December 21, 2023

Season chronology
- ← Previous; S2: Stone Wars Next → S4: Science Future

Dr. Stone is an anime television series produced by TMS Entertainment based on the manga series of the same name written by Riichiro Inagaki and illustrated by Boichi. Set 3,700 years after a mysterious light turns every human on the planet into stone, genius boy Senku Ishigami emerges from his petrification into a "Stone World" and seeks to rebuild human civilization from the ground up.

The third season, titled Dr. Stone: New World, aired in two split season cours consisting of 11 episodes each. The first cours aired from April 6 to June 15, 2023, while the second cours aired from October 12 to December 21 of the same year. The season premiered on Tokyo MX and KBS in a dual simulcast, with other networks following at later timeslots. It focuses on the story of the "New World" arc from the manga series. The season is streamed by Crunchyroll worldwide outside of Asia, with multiple language dubs to follow two weeks after airing. The English dub for the first cours of New World aired on Adult Swim's Toonami programming block from June 4 to August 27, 2023. The second cours aired on Toonami from November 12, 2023, to February 4, 2024.

Immediately following the season finale, a fourth and final season, titled Dr. Stone: Science Future, was announced.

For the first cours, the opening theme song is "Wasuregataki" (ワスレガタキ; lit. 'Forget-Me-Not') performed by Huwie Ishizaki, while the ending theme song is "Where Do We Go?" performed by Okamoto's. For the second cours, the opening theme song is "Haruka" (遥か; lit. 'Far Away') performed by Ryujin Kiyoshi, while the ending theme song is "Suki ni Shinayo" (好きにしなよ; lit. 'Suit Yourself') performed by Anly.

== Episodes ==
No. overall	No. in season	Title	Directed by (Note: Production staff information is taken from the ending credits of each episode)	Storyboarded by	Original release date	English air date
Part 1
36	1	"New World Map"	Tomomi Ikeda	Shinji Takagi	April 6, 2023	June 4, 2023
Returning from their balloon flight, Senku reveals to Ryusui his plan to construct an oil-powered ship to reach the source of the petrification ray, South America. Before that, they must successfully locate the still existing Sagara Oil Field. Ryusui enthusiastically agrees to help navigate as the ship's captain. Realizing their journey across the ocean will require tons of preserved food, they use their balloon and search teams on the ground to locate cedar trees for shipbuilding, wild animal herds for hunting, and an entire valley of wheat to make flour. To increase food production, Senku introduces crop farming, freeing the village from their reliance on foraging. Taiju, Magma, and Yo take to farming with particular enthusiasm as more food means they can afford to free more statues from petrification. In the post-credits, Senku's first attempt to bake bread is so bad it is practically poisonous. So he and Ryusui agree they must find a professional chef and free them from petrification immediately.
37	2	"Greed Equals Justice"; Transliteration: "Hoshī Ikōru Seigi" (Japanese: 欲しい=正義)	Tomochi Kosaka	Hiroyuki Hata	April 13, 2023	June 11, 2023
Senku reveals they have run out of revival fluid, but Ryusui correctly deduces that journalist Minami hid one person's worth of fluid, so Gen makes a secret deal with her to get it back. At Ryusui's direction, they locate and revive Francois, Ryusui's butler/chef of indeterminate gender and nationality. As a professional, Francois is unconcerned about 3,700 years have passed and gets to work producing Stollen, a Christmas sweet bread containing butter, nuts, fruit, and alcohol that can stay edible for a whole year. Minami demands that Senku fulfill her deal with Gen, so, working with Kaseki and Chrome, Senku recreates a daguerreotype, the world's first primitive camera. Minami swears she will photograph every stage of Senku's progress in reviving civilization. Senku also plans to use aerial photography in their search for the oil field. Ryusui surprises everyone by agreeing that the historic first photograph should be of Senku. After much arguing, Senku agrees to be photographed, but only in a very specific pose.
38	3	"First Contact"; Transliteration: "Fāsuto Kontakuto" (Japanese: ファーストコンタクト)	Yoshinobu Kasai	Yoshinobu Kasai	April 20, 2023	June 18, 2023
Despite the aerial photographs, the oil field remains hidden. Autumn arrives, and the wheat is harvested. Francois plans a gourmet celebration dinner, so Kohaku gathers Japanese boar piglets to raise on the farm for meat. While searching the photographs for a good spot to forage truffles, Kohaku accidentally locates the general location of the oil field. When they still cannot locate the oil, Senku remembers the Sagara Oil Field was originally discovered by Japanese boars bathing in oil-soaked mud. Managing to stop Francois in time, they instead use the boars as sniffer-boars who lead them directly to the oil. Suika adopts a Japanese boar as a pet, naming it Sagara. After processing oil into gasoline, Senku builds a rudimentary engine-powered speedboat, allowing them to visit the ocean. Chrome begins to realize just how big the world is. Senku announces his next goal, to create a GPS powered by a massive radio tower and Senku's wireless telephone. At Ginro's urging, Ruri almost uses the system to confess to Chrome. Unfortunately, it is interrupted by another signal. With his enhanced hearing, Ukyo confirms the signal is coming from a second functional radio tower, meaning other humans are alive somewhere on the planet, endlessly broadcasting the question "WHY?".
39	4	"Eyes of Science"; Transliteration: "Kagaku no Me" (Japanese: 科学の眼)	Shigeki Awai	Shinji Satō & Daiki Koyama	April 27, 2023	June 25, 2023
The existence of Why-Man is heavily debated as he may be a new enemy. Senku immediately crafts Scientific Eyes, using glass coated in sphalerite and the electricity channeling power of crystals. He creates a rudimentary cathode-ray tube television screen, which, when connected to the radio tower, becomes a radar/sonar to accurately pinpoint targets over vast distances, even underwater. Testing the sonar, Chrome is astounded it can even find fish, a welcome bonus for the upcoming voyage. The next issue emerges while making an engine, because one big enough for a ship will require tonnes of iron. Surprisingly, it is Chrome who solves the issue using what he learned from Senku. He connects an electromagnet to the radar and spontaneously reinvents the metal detector. Locating an iron deposit in a cave 1 mile (1.6 km) from the village, they begin mining, with Senku declaring they have reached the Industrial Revolution. Senku uses a petrol by-product plus gravel to make asphalt concrete, allowing iron to be driven from the mine to the river by a paved road, where Ryusui then sails it to the village. Under Senku and Kaseki's expertise, the minecarts are designed to make mining the iron even easier.
40	5	"Science Vessel Perseus"; Transliteration: "Kagakusen Peruseusu" (Japanese: 科学船ペルセウス)	Nana Harada	Chie Nishizawa	May 4, 2023	July 9, 2023
Even with Kaseki's skills, the ship proves impossible to assemble accurately. Ryusui recreates a scale model of a ship, allowing Senku to use a pantograph to accurately copy the ship pieces to the accurate size and shapes. The ship's construction begins running smoothly, but the engine requires Senku's absolute focus during its construction, as a single mistake could cause an explosion. Almost a year later, the ship is finished. As it may be the last time they are all together, Minami insists on a commemorative photograph to mark the launching of the ship Perseus on the 10th of September, 5741 AD. After careful consideration, the Perseus crew is finalized: Ryusui, Senku, Chrome, Kaseki, Yuzuriha, Ukyo, Francois, Kohaku, Magma, Taiju, Nikki, Yō, Gen, and Kinro. As they are too dangerous to leave behind, Senku brings Hyoga and Homura to the ship's brig. Ginro fakes bravery by pretending to swim after the ship, hoping to impress Ruri, only to be hauled aboard by Taiju, dooming him to join the crew. Before starting the voyage to South America, Senku intends to find the island where his father, Byakuya, returned to Earth with the other astronauts and locate something vital for their mission, the crashed Soyuz rocket.
41	6	"Treasure Box"	Tomochi Kosaka	Shinji Takagi	May 11, 2023	July 23, 2023 (Note: Episode 42 of Dr. Stone erroneously aired in place of episode 41 on Adult Swim on the night of July 15/16, 2023. To accommodate for the mistake, the block aired #41 the following week on July 23rd and re-aired #42 on July 30th. For reader consistency, the table uses the intentional rebroadcast date for #42.)
Senku reveals the Soyuz, the birthplace of the Hundred Tales, will help produce enough revival fluid for the whole planet. Senku had noticed a lot of villagers were named after ores (Magma, Chrome, Kohaku, Kin) and deduced from one of the Tales that Byakuya left a stash of valuable ores in the Soyuz, including platinum, a catalyst that can produce the nitric acid which gives the revival fluid its power. One of the crew, No-Name, abruptly reveals he is not a native of Ishigami village. He was found and adopted; his real name is Soyuz, and he comes from another village of astronaut descendants that live on the island with the crashed rocket. Everyone is happy but also nervous in case these distant cousins of theirs are hostile or may even be Why-man. Many villagers become seasick, so Senku extracts a seasickness medicine, scopolamine, from the flower devil's trumpet. A storm hits, providing an opportunity to sail close to the island and use Senku's technology to determine if the locals are hostile. As they approach, Soyuz is overjoyed to finally see where he was born.
42	7	"Ray of Despair, Ray of Hope"; Transliteration: "Zetsubō to Kibō no Hikari" (Japanese: 絶望と希望の光)	Tomomi Ikeda	Shinpei Nagai	May 18, 2023	July 30, 2023
The crew sends Senku, Soyuz, Kohaku, and Gen to find the islanders. Ryusui finds Suika stowed away on the ship. Ukyo and Ginro find statues underwater and realize they couldn't be from the petrification event 3700 years ago since the island was uninhabited before the astronauts arrived, so these statues were petrified much later. Losing radio contact, Soyuz and Gen find everyone on board petrified into statues, except for Suika, whom Ryusui saved by throwing her overboard. The shock causes Soyuz to remember he and his parents left the island to escape something. Finding evidence of foraging, Senku and Gen use forensics and psychological profiling to determine it is a young girl of average height with dark hair who lives by the mountains. They soon spot the girl, Amaryllis, and determine from her conversation she is engaged to an anonymous Master who uses petrification. Senku openly approaches Amaryllis, who is amazed to see other people. A sudden commotion takes them to Amaryllis' village, where a mob plans to rebel against the Master. For their safety, Senku incapacitates them with chloroacetone, aka World War 1 tear gas. Seeing Senku's "sorcery", Amaryllis begs them to defeat the Master in exchange for the secret of petrification.
43	8	"The Trump Card Aboard the Science Vessel"; Transliteration: "Kirifuda wa Kagaku no Fune ni" (Japanese: 切り札は科学の船に)	Tomoko Hiramuki, Ying Xing Mao, Tomochi Kosaka & Erio	Mitsuko Kase	May 25, 2023	August 6, 2023
5 years ago, Amaryllis had attempted to leave the island with her friends, but they were caught by guards Moz and Kirisame, who petrified and threw them into the ocean. Amaryllis avoided the weapons' light by inches. Amaryllis has been plotting all these years to marry the Master and steal the weapon. Senku is glad to confirm it is a weapon and not magic since weapons follow scientific principles and can be defeated. As the Master only marries the cutest girl, Kohaku volunteers as she stands the best chance of stealing the weapon. Amaryllis donates a dress, but Senku requires the mobile lab from the ship to make makeup, which the Master's Minister Ibara has now captured. Seeing Ibara smashing the crew statues, Kohaku flies into a rage and fights Kirisame while shouting for the mobile lab. Kirisame has never heard of a lab, so Gen convinces her that Senku is her boyfriend, Lab, embarrassing Kirisame into leaving. Miraculously, both Ginro and Suika had survived due to Ukyo shooting the weapon slightly off target. Ginro is unanimously written off as useless by everyone, but Suika, having heard Kohaku shouting, is determined to get the lab off the ship to Senku.
44	9	"Beautiful Science"; Transliteration: "Utsukushī Kagaku" (Japanese: 美しい科学)	Yoshihiro Nishio	Nana Harada	June 1, 2023	August 13, 2023
Ginro attempts to flee the ship due to his cowardice, but when he sees Suika bravely creating a distraction, he is guilted into helping tip the lab overboard and reunite with Senku. To throw off the guards, Senku convinces them the lab is a giant animal by combining sulfur with amine from rotten shellfish and skatole from jasmine to create the smell of dung. Hiding the lab in a cave, Senku makes shampoo by mixing coconut oil with salt, sodium hydroxide and sulphuric acid; hair conditioner from coconut oil, honey, and lemon; makeup from coconut oil, crushed mica and other colored rocks; lipstick from coconut oil, honey and crushed insects; and perfume from lemon, jasmine, and vanilla. Kohaku is transformed from a wild gorilla to a cute beauty. To increase their chances, Amaryllis uses makeup to disguise Ginro as a cute girl too. Ibara selects all three of them and a dozen other girls to be presented to the Master for choosing. Moz narrowly prevents Kohaku from breaking the oblivious Ibara's fingers and, excited by her secret strength, promises to fight her himself when she causes trouble at the palace. Senku begins making plans to steal the petrification weapon.
45	10	"Science Wars"	Harume Kosaka	Satoshi Shimizu	June 8, 2023	August 20, 2023
Senku is revealed to have disguised a Rochelle salt sound transmitting crystal and a copper wire antenna as an earring, allowing him to send instructions from his wireless telephone into Kohaku's ear, though she can't send replies. As only Kirisame has been seen using the weapon, Senku plans to steal it when Kirisame throws it into the air to activate it. For that, he intends to recreate the radio-controlled drone by combining a bamboo frame with four plastic propellers and electromagnetically powered motors controlled by radio signals. Inside the citadel of interconnected tree houses, Kohaku sneaks around and finds something important. An elder wife informs them they must train for a week before meeting the Master. Senku manages to send a basic radio-controlled car to Kohaku so she can send back a written message. As none of them have learned to write yet, Kohaku sends Senku a confusing drawing. Using all his mentalist tricks, Gen puts himself in Kohaku's mind; illiterate but smart with basic science knowledge and limited time to make the drawing. Eventually, Senku deduces a sentence: "We found platinum", confirming that the Soyuz capsule is inside the citadel.
46	11	"With This Fist, A Miracle"; Transliteration: "Kiseki wa Kono Tenohira de" (Japanese: 奇跡はこの掌で)	Nana Harada	Satoshi Shimizu	June 15, 2023	August 27, 2023
Kohaku confirms the capsule is buried under the citadel's largest tree, protected by another concrete shell, which she cannot break open without alerting guards. Senku, having deduced Byakuya would preserve the capsule using concrete, decides to send Kohaku a silent bomb. By mixing diluted sulphuric acid with anhydrite he creates expanding plaster, which, when inserted into holes in the concrete, forcibly expands and cracks the concrete open from the inside. Kohaku finds a glass bottle she accidentally breaks but sends the powder it contains to Senku on the toy cars. It turns out to be mostly gold dust, but Senku can find an entire test tube worth of pure platinum. Given platinum's rarity, Senku realizes Byakuya must have spent decades dredging rivers to collect it for him; confirmed by flashbacks that Byakuya continued obsessively collecting it until his death of extreme old age while still dredging a river. His children and grandchildren would then seal the bottle in the Soyuz per his wishes. Senku is beyond grateful for Byakuya's sacrifice and, determined not to waste it, gets to work producing the nitric acid using a Ostwald process machine for more revival fluid. Ibara finds the Soyuz and realizes an enemy has infiltrated the citadel. Senku's first goal is to rescue his petrified friends on the Perseus.
Part 2
47	12	"The Kingdom of Science's Counterattack"; Transliteration: "Hangeki no Kagaku Ōkoku" (Japanese: 反撃の科学王国)	Tomomi Ikeda	Satoshi Shimizu	October 12, 2023	November 12, 2023
To improve his drone, Senku decides to revive Kaseki first, but realizes guards are throwing all their friends' smashed statues into the ocean. This means they will first require Ryusui to dive and retrieve them. Ibara takes Ryusui to the citadel and begins smashing him to pieces, hoping to provoke enemy infiltrators to reveal themselves. Kohaku diverts suspicion by destroying Ryusui herself, knowing he can be revived as long as he is rebuilt first. They send the pieces to Senku on the radio cars, allowing Ryusui to be rebuilt and revived. To handle the water's depth, Senku creates scuba gear by borrowing steam pipes from the mobile lab, though it will only hold 10 minutes of air. Ryusui and Soyuz dive and locate Kaseki hopelessly buried in the sand. With only 4 minutes of air left, Ryusui realizes they need brute strength, so by Morse code, he asks for revival fluid from Senku and performs an emergency underwater revival on Taiju. Despite only having one breath of air, Taiju grasps the situation and tears Kaseki free of the sand, making it to the surface with only seconds to spare.
48	13	"The Medusa's True Face"; Transliteration: "Medyūsa no Sugao" (Japanese: メデューサの素顔)	Koichiro Kuroda	Satoshi Shimizu	October 19, 2023	November 19, 2023
Taiju begins freediving to retrieve the statues. Kaseki is revived, and with his help, Senku makes the drone propeller by coating feathers in plastic attached to a fidget spinner. Taiju collects all the statues, including an extra statue that has been petrified for years. In the citadel, Ginro is chosen to marry the Master. Moz deduces that Kohaku is the infiltrator. Terrified of the Master's impending molestation, Ginro decides to use a gas bomb Senku made from vinegar, alcohol and sulphuric acid to cause the Master intense mental confusion. Entering the Master's room, Ginro encounters Ibara, who insists all girls traditionally must satisfy him first before marrying the Master. Exposed, Kohaku begins fighting Moz. Ginro neutralizes Ibara with the gas and discovers the Master was petrified years ago so Ibara could secretly take over. Moz is attracted to Kohaku for her beauty and strength and is irritated she rejects him for lacking honor. Ginro is fatally stabbed by Ibara but manages to tell Kohaku the Master was almost certainly Soyuz's father. To save his life, Kohaku provokes Kirisame into petrifying them both, trusting Senku to find and revive them. As the weapon activates, Kohaku sees it clearly for the first time, a complex scientific device she dubs the Medusa, from a story Senku told her of the mythical Greek monster.
49	14	"Deal Game, Test of Wit"; Transliteration: "Zunō-sen no Dīru Gēmu" (Japanese: 頭脳戦のディールゲーム)	Nana Fujiwara	Shinichi Tōkairin	October 26, 2023	November 26, 2023
Senku begins reviving the rest of the crew just as Amaryllis arrives with news of Kohaku and Ginro's petrification and that Soyuz is likely the Master's son. Senku and the others deduce there is only one Medusa weapon, but due to the range of its attack, it risks petrifying the one who activates it, which is why Ibara daren't use it himself and forces Kirisame to do it. This also means Kirisame isn't aware the Master is petrified or how evil Ibara is. Moz appears in the cave at that moment, but in a moment of extremely rapid deduction, everyone realizes Moz knew Kohaku and Ginro were intruders yet never told Ibara, meaning Moz is secretly Ibara's enemy. Using every mentalist trick he knows, Gen has Moz admit he wants to kill Ibara and rule himself, but only fear of petrification has stopped him. Moz agrees to help defeat Ibara, but only if he can keep Medusa and become the new Master. They outfit Moz with his own sound-receiving earring as he returns to the citadel. Needing Ibara worried enough to use the Medusa again, Senku sends Moz a modern scientific spear so he can attack his own men disguised as a kingdom of science warrior.
50	15	"Battle in Three Dimensions"; Transliteration: "Sanjigen no Kessen" (Japanese: 三次元の決戦)	Yusaku Saotome	Shinji Takagi	November 2, 2023	December 3, 2023
Moz's attack terrifies the soldiers as planned. Knowing Moz will likely betray them, Senku crafts a weapon to neutralize Moz's superior strength, a rudimentary gunpowder pistol, though Senku is deeply saddened to have reintroduced guns to the world and consoles himself that at least no one will be killed due to the healing factor of petrification/revival. For safety, Senku gives the gun to Yō, a former police officer, but when he turns out to be a bad shot, Amaryllis tricks the villagers into playing loud music so Ibara's men don't hear Yō practicing. Senku plans to tangle the Medusa's rope with the drone when Kirisame throws it. As it will then become a tug-of-war to capture Medusa, Senku revives Magma and Nikki and crafts tough carbon fiber rope from tar. Hearing what happened to Ginro, Kinro insists on defeating Moz personally with his new golden spear. Senku upgrades the drone using the gyroscopic properties of the fidget spinner, making it easier to control. As an expert pilot, the controls are given to Ryusui. With everything ready, Moz lures Kirisame and his men to the ambush site atop a cliff by the ocean.
51	16	"Total War"; Transliteration: "Zendo Dairansen" (Japanese: 全土大乱戦)	Osamu Nabeshima	Osamu Nabeshima	November 9, 2023	December 10, 2023
Kirisame throws the Medusa while Moz waits for the right moment to betray them. It is revealed Ibara stole Kohaku's earrings and heard every conversation between Moz and Senku, so he had Kirisame use a fake Medusa. They are forced to flee in the mobile lab but Yo realizes that Magma and Gen are missing and Magma has stolen the gun, planning to shoot Ibara and be the hero. However, they realize Ibara has stolen Perseus and brought everyone from the village and citadel onboard, meaning he can petrify the entire island and only target Senku and his friends. Surprisingly, Senku instantly concocts a plan to win; by retrieving the previous master's statue they can expose Ibara in front of everyone and make Soyuz the master by birthright. Magma and Gen steal a boat to reach Perseus, forcing half of Senku's team to try to catch him before he wastes all the ammunition. The others find the master's statue destroyed, and Yuzuriha realizes that due to the abuse it received from Ibara over 20 years, much of it has eroded into dust, so even if they reassemble him he can never be revived. Remembering his father's face, Soyuz decides to reassemble him anyway. Magma, Senku and the others reach the Perseus.
52	17	"Joker"	Nana Harada & Tomochi Kosaka	Susumu Nishizawa	November 16, 2023	December 17, 2023
Magma fires the gun randomly, scaring many of Ibara's men into jumping overboard. Nikki retrieves the pistol which has only two shots remaining. Moz knocks Yo and the pistol overboard and defeats Kinro, so everyone retreats into Perseus' lower decks. Ibara follows to gloat at his victory, but Senku reveals he was actually looking for Hyoga, petrified in his cell since they reached the island, whom Senku now revives. Ibara flees after realizing Senku can revive statues, correctly deducing they are reassembling the master. Hyoga considers joining Moz as Moz's value of strength is similar to his own, but when he learns Moz only values women for their beauty he chooses Senku and engages Moz in a spear duel. Kirisame approaches the Perseus with Medusa. Senku and the others flee ashore while Moz defeats Hyoga easily. Ibara orders a soldier, Oarashi, to activate Medusa on the island, even though it would petrify him too, claiming it is the will of the master. Kirisame, who remembers the master as a kind man, finally questions Ibara's abuse of power, just as Taiju appears with the master's statue for everyone to see. Angered at being exposed, Ibara petrifies Kirisame and pushes her overboard, but before he can petrify anyone else Yō shoots his hand so he drops the Medusa, which Yō catches before it can sink underwater.
53	18	"Flicker of Doom"; Transliteration: "Horobi no Kirameki" (Japanese: 滅びの煌めき)	Harume Kosaka	Shinji Takagi	November 23, 2023	December 17, 2023
Yō attempts to petrify Moz as he continues to duel Hyoga, but has no idea how Medusa is activated. Hyoga escapes to the island after Senku, trusting he has a plan as Moz chases him. It is revealed Hyoga was struggling in the fight as he is unused to Kinro's spear. Knowing this, Senku has begun crafting pieces to recreate a flexible kuda yari spear that Hyoga trained with for years. Now armed with his ideal weapon, Moz is overwhelmed by Hyoga's superior technique. Ibara activates Medusa with a voice command, petrifying Yō, then retrieves Medusa which he programs to petrify the whole island in 15 minutes before forcing Oarashi to swallow it to carry it to the center of the island. Senku and the others capture Oarashi but can't remove Medusa from his stomach before it activates, petrifying everyone. Ibara returns to the island but finds all the statues posed in the same unusual stance in a straight line. He also recognizes Soyuz as the master's missing heir. After smashing Oarashi to retrieve Medusa, Ibara finds Senku somehow avoided being petrified and has prepared several scientific weapons to fight Ibara himself in a showdown.
54	19	"Last Man Standing"	Tomomi Ikeda	Shinichi Tōkairin	November 30, 2023	January 14, 2024
It is revealed everyone lined up so Senku could time the intervals between their being petrified and calculate the green light moves at 10 meters per second. Knowing this, Senku was able to toss a jar of revival fluid into the air at just the right moment that it would fall on him 2 seconds after he was petrified, reviving him straight away. Senku runs Ibara over with the mobile lab and grabs Medusa, but Ibara reveals he is wearing primitive body armor, wounds Senku's arm, and takes back Medusa. Senku is forced to run while Ibara throws Medusa with a 5-second timer, unaware Senku had also revived Ryusui who enacts their original plan to steal Medusa with the drone. Unfortunately, Ibara wins the tug of war, retrieves Medusa again, and throws it at Senku as the timer expires. Ryusui sacrifices himself to save Senku and is petrified again. Ibara grabs Medusa, unaware Ryusui had attached a transmitter earring to it. With a voice command sent via mobile telephone, Medusa activates and petrifies Ibara. Senku's celebration is short-lived as he realizes he is alone again. At that moment he receives a telephone call from Ruri asking how the voyage is going; reminding him that this time he is not truly alone.
55	20	"First Dream"	Nana Fujiwara	Daiki Koyama	December 7, 2023	January 21, 2024
Senku revives Chrome to help make revival fluid for everyone. Chrome is worried about Ruri, whose call to Senku ended when the phone battery died, and since Ibara smashed all the equipment on the Perseus they can't call her back. After reviving the rest of the crew, Senku also revives Kirisame who leads them to the statues of Kohaku and Ginro, whose fatal stab wounds are completely healed by the revival process. They also revive and befriend Oarashi and Ibara's soldiers. Senku repairs the telephone, but Why-Man interrupts his call to Ruri and attempts to voice command Medusa to activate a blast of 12,800,000 metres (8,000 mi), big enough for the whole planet. Such blatant hostility confirms that Why-Man is an enemy, but also confuses everyone as Why-Man speaks in Senku's voice. Ukyo confirms the voice is somehow computer-generated in the stone world. Needing answers, they revive the extra statue Taiju retrieved from the ocean, which has a visible Medusa tattoo. The man, Matsukaze, who was petrified hundreds of years ago, reveals he and his village were petrified when dozens of Medusas fell from the sky. Excited, Senku repurposes the old sonic cannon into a parabolic antenna to track Why-Man's signal, confirming without a doubt that Why-Man can only be in one place; the moon. Senku decides his next goal is to reinvent space flight.
56	21	"Treasure Island"; Transliteration: "Takarajima" (Japanese: ｢宝島｣)	Nana Harada	Satoshi Shimizu	December 14, 2023	January 28, 2024
Senku's plan involves collecting skilled people and materials from all over the world, so they plan to leave after freeing everyone Ibara petrified. Soyuz decides to stay and is accepted as the new master. With Soyuz as an intermediary, the islanders become allies of the Kingdom of Science and begin construction of their own radio tower. To cement their friendship, Gen provides cotton candy, ramen, sushi, and other modern pleasures. Kirisame and Matsukaze agree to accompany Senku to other countries. Surprisingly, Matsukaze swears loyalty to Ginro, who bears such a close resemblance to his master before he was petrified that he must have been Ginro's direct ancestor. Senku puts on a special show by reinventing fireworks, which were always Byakuya's favorite. Senku feels unexpected nostalgia, realizing Byakuya stood on the same beach thousands of years ago and paved the way for Senku to survive and one day reach outer space. As they depart on the Perseus, Senku reasons that going to space will require Ryusui as the pilot, himself as a scientist, and their strongest warrior. Returning to Ishigami village with Medusa, everyone rejoices as Senku can now petrify and revive the fatally injured Tsukasa, still safely preserved in the freezer where Senku placed him.
57	22	"Beyond the New World"	Shūhei Matsushita	Satoshi Shimizu	December 21, 2023	February 4, 2024
Senku reveals Medusa's power supply is running out. Luckily, it has just enough to petrify Tsukasa, after which Senku revives him completely healed. After his initial shock, Tsukasa accepts Senku's goal of reaching the moon. As Senku is the only person to still have petrification scars, everyone recreates their own scars with paint, vowing not to remove them until they defeat Why-Man. Yuzuriha and Kaseki craft a massive globe of the earth showing each country they will need to visit for materials. Senku plans to revive as many people as possible around the world to support his space program. Ukyo abruptly reminds everyone of Dunbar's number, a theory suggesting a group can only function with less than 150 people, add any more and differing opinions can lead to conflict and the eventual collapse of the group. So if Senku revives too many people, the chaos will end the space program before it starts. Deciding to risk it anyway Senku plots a course east across the Pacific Ocean to the United States to find their first material: sweetcorn as a food source and for brewing enough corn-based alcohol to make thousands of gallons of revival fluid. With preparations complete, Senku and his crew set sail to America.

== Home media release ==
=== Japanese ===
Toho Animation (Japan – Region 2/A)
Box		Discs	Episodes	Release date	Ref.
3rd Season	1	3	1–11 + Dr. Stone: Ryusui	July 19, 2023	
3rd Season	2	3	12–22	February 21, 2024	

=== English ===
Crunchyroll LLC (North America – Region 1/A)
Part		Episodes	Release date	Ref.
Season 3	1	1–11	May 21, 2024	
Season 3	2	12–22 + Dr. Stone: Ryusui	December 31, 2024	
