= Dr. Stone season 4 =

2025 Japanese television season

Dr. Stone: Science Future
- Season 4
- Japanese cover art for the first home media disc box set of Dr. Stone: Science Future
- No. of episodes: 37

Release
- Original network: Tokyo MX, KBS
- Original release: January 9, 2025 – June 25, 2026

Season chronology
- ← Previous; S3: New World

Dr. Stone is an anime television series produced by TMS Entertainment based on the manga series of the same name written by Riichiro Inagaki and illustrated by Boichi. Set 3,700 years after a mysterious light turns every human on the planet into stone, genius boy Senku Ishigami emerges from his petrification into a "Stone World" and seeks to rebuild human civilization from the ground up.

Immediately following the conclusion of the third season, a fourth and final season titled Dr. Stone: Science Future was announced. The season comprises 37 episodes split across three cours, with the first cours (12 episodes) airing from January 9 to March 27, 2025. The second cours (12 episodes) aired from July 10 to September 25, 2025. The third and final cours (13 episodes) aired from April 2 to June 25, 2026.

For the first cours, the opening theme song is "Casanova Posse" performed by ALI, while the ending theme song is "Rolling Stone" performed by Breimen. For the second cours, the opening theme song is "Supernova" performed by Kana-Boon, while the ending theme song is "No Man's World" performed by Otoha. For the third and final cours, the opening theme song is "Skins" performed by Asian Kung-Fu Generation, while the ending theme song is "Rocket" performed by Burnout Syndromes.

For the series finale, "Good Morning World", performed by Burnout Syndromes, was used for its closing credits. The song was also used as the series' first opening theme.

== Episodes ==
No. overall	No. in season	Title	Directed by (Note: Production staff information is taken from the ending credits of each episode)	Written by	Storyboarded by	Original release date
Part 1
58	1	"Ryusui vs. Senku"	Nana Harada	Kurasumi Sunayama	Satoshi Shimizu	January 9, 2025
Ryusui and Senku argue over which route to take to America. Ryusui desires to use the easier rhumb line that will take 70 days, while Senku desires to take the more dangerous Great Circle Route that will take 40 days. Senku wants to arrive in America in time to harvest corn to make revival fluid, knowing if they arrive in winter, they'd have to wait another year. To settle the dispute, Senku and Ryusui decide to play a game of poker where the winner will decide which route to take. Gen joins Ryusui's side, filling Senku with suspicion that they will cheat, causing Kohaku to join Senku's side and use her sight to keep an eye on Gen. While Kohaku catches Gen numerous times, she and Senku become distracted for a split second, allowing Gen to change Ryusui's hand. Senku counters this and wins with a royal straight flush due to marking his cards with urushiol, which he is allergic to. To improve conditions for the crew, Ryusui sets up a casino so that everyone can join in on the fun while Senku creates beer as a last component for the morale boost.
59	2	"Science Journey"	Nana Fujiwara	Kurasumi Sunayama	Hideaki Oba	January 16, 2025
Francois makes non-alcoholic cocktails for Suika, Tsukasa, Gen, Kohaku, and Senku at Ryusui's request, much to their satisfaction. Matsukaze shares his story about his late master to a drunken Ginro. Senku revives Hyoga who agrees to train Matsukaze in modern fighting techniques at Tsukasa's request on the condition that he have the right to revive two people, and as a result, Moz and Homura are revived by Senku and reluctantly join the crew. Inspired by the story of the Vikings who sailed across the sea all the way to America, Chrome creates a sunstone with a piece of calcite that they can use to pinpoint the location of the sun in any type of weather condition. After days of sailing across the Pacific Ocean, the science crew finally arrives in America.
60	3	"Light Trap in the Darkness"; Transliteration: "Kurayami no Yūgatō" (Japanese: 暗闇の誘蛾灯)	Tomomi Ikeda	Aki Kindaichi	Satoshi Shimizu	January 23, 2025
The science crew anchors in the San Francisco Bay, splitting into two teams: one to gather resources on the ship, the other to search for corn nearby. Tsukasa and the fighters escort the scouting party up the Sacramento River to protect them from wildlife. They are suddenly ambushed by a horde of crocodiles, which the fighters quickly dispatch, providing fresh meat for burgers. Inside a croc's stomach, they find corn, prompting them to continue upstream. Kohaku spots more corn floating downriver, sparking Senku's suspicion. Senku contacts the ship to check for corn in the Bay, then uses a light trap to attract insects. Among them are moths that feed on corn, signaling a large supply nearby. Just as the group considers this, Tsukasa senses danger. Realizing they've been led into a trap, they are attacked by an unknown assailant wielding a machine gun. Forced to retreat under heavy fire, they regroup. Ukyo deduces that someone must have revived independently, cultivated corn, and built their own settlement. Senku concludes that they are dealing with another scientist, one with hostile intentions, raising his determination.
61	4	"Dr. X"	Kayona Yamada	Kurasumi Sunayama	Chie Nishizawa	January 30, 2025
As the scouting team returns to the ship, they are suddenly attacked by the unknown assailant, now revealed to be flying a plane. Acting quickly, Senku crafts an acetylene gas grenade, which Kirisame throws at the aircraft, disabling its engines. The assailant crashes nearby but escapes before capture. Investigating the wreck, the team finds the plane intact enough to commandeer, seeing it as a valuable tactical advantage. Inside, they discover corn kernels, suggesting the enemy is using the cornfield as a runway. Senku sends Gen, Chrome, and Kohaku to locate it. Following the assailants' footprints, Gen grows convinced that they're being lured into a trap. Taking the risk himself, he continues ahead alone, leaving a trail of flower petals for his companions to follow. Gen is soon confronted by the pilot Stanley Snyder who escorts him to his leader. There, Gen meets Dr. Xeno, the head of the American colony and one of the world's most brilliant scientists. Xeno begins interrogating him, seeking the identity of the opposing scientist. Wanting to protect Senku, Gen lies to him, naming Taiju as their leader.
62	5	"Doctor vs. Doctor"	Chako Sato	Aki Kindaichi	Daiki Koyama	February 6, 2025
From a distance, Chrome and Kohaku scout the enemy's base and spot Gen inside. They contact the science crew, but Senku abruptly ends the call to avoid the enemy eavesdropping on their conversation. Moments later, Dr. Xeno reaches out over their frequency, requesting Taiju, believing him to be the group's scientist. Using this mistaken identity to their advantage, Taiju confronts Xeno about endangering lives with machine guns. Xeno counters this by revealing that he has built a Haber-Bosch plant, enabling limitless gunpowder production. When pressed for information on revival fluid, Taiju refuses, even at the risk of war, prompting Xeno to end the call. Soon, Stanley's plane flies overhead, confirming Xeno knows their location. Realizing the enemy won't risk low-altitude pursuit after the river incident, Senku proposes converting the Perseus into an aircraft carrier to launch their captured plane. Meanwhile, the crew plans to seize the enemy's factory and cornfield by deducing Chrome and Kohaku's position from radio signal timing, suggesting Xeno's base is close by. At Hyoga's suggestion, a battle team consisting of Hyoga, Tsukasa, Ukyo, and Suika is dispatched to locate Chrome and Kohaku while also attempting to capture Xeno.
63	6	"Science Is Elegant"	Osamu Nabeshima	Kurasumi Sunayama	Osamu Nabeshima	February 13, 2025
As part of Xeno's plan to eliminate the Kingdom of Science's leader, Stanley sends a young woman named Luna to infiltrate the science crew and find Taiju so that he can kill him once she lures him out in the open. Ryusui becomes suspicious of her, believing that she's a spy. Senku on the other hand secretly plans to extract as much information from Luna as possible about Xeno and his crew, that way, he will transmit the encrypted message to Tsukasa's special squad. Luna searches for Taiju and succeeds in locating him, but before she can attempt to give Stanley the signal, Senku appears and begins to charm her in an attempt to extract information from her about Xeno. He is suddenly interrupted by Ryusui and Francois as the former puts in a request to give her something desirable. This results in Senku and Francois making ice cream for her to enjoy, much to her delight. In a surprising turn of events, Senku begins to realize who Dr. Xeno truly is and reveals that he is a former NASA scientist, as well as his old science mentor from his childhood who helped kickstart his passion of building advanced rockets.
64	7	"The Two Scientists"; Transliteration: "Futari no Kagaku-sha" (Japanese: 二人の科学者)	Shunji Yoshida	Aki Kindaichi	Satoshi Shimizu	February 20, 2025
As Senku realizes who Dr. Xeno is, he flashes back to when he was a child still attempting to build his first rocket with Taiju. A failed attempt had him reach out to NASA for assistance, where most of the scientists agreed to not give a child that kind of information. However, a 20 year old Xeno responds with instructions and materials he can use, allowing Senku to borrow his father Byakuya's government-supplied credit card to gather what he needs. At the same time, however, Xeno's own projects keep getting rejected at NASA, leaving him bitter. When approached with a hypothetical stone world scenario by Byakuya at NASA, Xeno says he would rule with an iron fist, destroying any who opposed him. On the eve of humanity's petrification, both Xeno and Senku analyze the petrified swallows, with Xeno realizing they're still alive and can maintain consciousness. As the petrification wave hits the planet, Xeno orders Stanley, Luna, and the others to remain conscious at all costs. Knowing they'd both need corn for their respective plans, Xeno and Senku strategize an eventual trip to California when they both suddenly break free of petrification.
65	8	"Lock On"	Chako Sato	Kurasumi Sunayama	Satoshi Shimizu	February 27, 2025
Xeno breaks free from petrification and locates a nearby cave, deducing his freedom came because of bat manure-filled nitric acid. Using this compound, he awakens Stanley and the rest of his team, relocates to northern California, and establishes his Haber-Bosch base in order to set himself up for world dominance. Back in the present, aboard the Perseus, Luna feels conflicted about pointing out Taiju to Stanley nearby for him to snipe, so she mouths the name "Senku" into the nearby trees for Stanley and his team to relay to Xeno. Ryusui witnesses this, raising his suspicions even more, and as Stanley's team contacts Xeno, the radio signals aboard the ship show signs of scrambling, indicating a sniping team is nearby. As Ryusui announces this warning, Stanley is able to deduce who Senku truly is due to Xeno realizing that Senku is the true scientist upon calculating his height from an archive of voice recordings. With limited time, Senku takes cover and quickly combines starch and water in a bag to make a viscous bulletproof vest. Even while hiding, Senku's position on the Perseus is calculated by Stanley, allowing him to fire, striking Senku as he holds his bag.
66	9	"Light of Science"; Transliteration: "Kagaku no Akari" (Japanese: 科学の灯)	Tomomi Ikeda	Aki Kindaichi	Daiki Koyama	March 6, 2025
While his bulletproof bag softened the blow, Senku is badly wounded from the sniper shot and is now bedridden. As a former med student from the old world, Luna offers to help treat Senku's wounds after Taiju begs her to do so. Meanwhile, Chrome and Kohaku continue to scout the American's base from afar as Tsukasa, Hyoga, Ukyo, and Suika arrive, having followed Gen's flower trail. In order to infiltrate their base undetected, Tsukasa and Hyoga suggest digging their way in from beneath the base using an invention Senku could create. However, the team soon receives a Uesugi cipher message informing them of what happened to Senku. To buy themselves time to build their machine, Ukyo shoots an arrow with the Medusa to Xeno's base for him to analyze, as well as intimidate him about the true nature of the device itself. In his base, Xeno plans for a new weapon to be ready in two weeks, while Chrome, remembering everything Senku taught him, begins his roadmap to create the tunneling drill.
67	10	"Dirty Roads"; Transliteration: "Tsuchi Mamire no Michi o" (Japanese: 土まみれの道を)	Kayona Yamada	Kurasumi Sunayama	Kayona Yamada	March 13, 2025
In need of parts to construct the drill, Taiju drives the mobile lab with equipment to Chrome's team. Along the way, he picks up Carlos, one of Xeno's two spies keeping an eye on the Perseus, knowing they'd tail him if he didn't. With parts in hand, Chrome's team puts the drill together and successfully test it. On the ship, Senku continues to give instructions to convert the boat into an aircraft carrier, causing Luna to fall in love with him for his leadership through duress. She sends Chrome's team an encrypted message, claiming Senku as her boyfriend, which causes Carlos to align with the Kingdom of Science since he's always "Team Luna" and draws them a map of the layout of Xeno's base. Having been wearing the radio earring the whole time, Gen breaks the number code for his understanding while Xeno's team finishes their new weapon. As Stanley flies his plane toward the Perseus as a sign of war, Ryusui and a mending Senku board their commandeered plane and launch it into the sky from the carrier to begin the dogfight.
68	11	"Those Who Know the Rules; Those Who Make Them"; Transliteration: "Rūru o Shiru-mono; Tsukuru-mono" (Japanese: ルールを知る者創る者)	Tomochi Kosaka & Nana Harada	Aki Kindaichi	Yoshiharu Ashino	March 20, 2025
Senku and Ryusui engage with Stanley in an aerial dogfight, with both sides demonstrating complicated maneuvers in order to get behind the other. Just as Stanley is about to be cornered, Xeno's hidden weapon is revealed to be a submarine, which travels undetected down the river. It then rams into the Perseus, destroying the bow of the ship, while Xeno's war team inside captures members of the Kingdom of Science. Senku carpet bombs Stanley's plane with acetylene gas and disables it, though he accidentally opens a gas bomb aboard their own plane and causes it to crash as well. Intending to capture Stanley, Senku and Ryusui instead find a lookalike decoy while the real Stanley appears with the submarine team and shoots Moz and Matsukaze, incapacitating them as they attempted to free the Kingdom of Science. At the same time, Tsukasa and the battle team emerge from their tunnel and corner a defenseless Xeno in his base.
69	12	"Reunion"; Transliteration: "Saikai" (Japanese: 再会)	Osamu Nabeshima	Kurasumi Sunayama	Osamu Nabeshima	March 27, 2025
The battle team infiltrates Xeno's tower, rescues Gen, and successfully captures Xeno. During their escape through the tunnel, Chrome’s homemade bomb accidentally causes a collapse, trapping him with Xeno. As both sides work to dig them out, Xeno, impressed by Chrome's intellect, attempts to recruit him, but Chrome refuses. Once freed, Chrome radios Senku to report their success. Elsewhere, the Perseus spy Max frees Luna, along with Francois and Kaseki at her request. They regroup with the battle team, Senku, and Ryusui, forming a new advance party. Hijacking a small boat, Senku contacts Brody, Xeno's top mechanic. Offering the revival fluid recipe, Senku proposes an alliance to build a city in America by reviving one million people. Intrigued, Brody agrees and frees the Perseus crew but warns him that Stanley will pursue them relentlessly. As the boat nears the Perseus, Stanley opens fire, knocking the Medusa from its bow, and assuming Gen lied about its purpose, he vows to hunt them across the globe. After saying goodbye to their allies who are staying behind, Senku's group sets course for South America, the epicenter of the original petrification beam.
Part 2
70	13	"Watching the Same Moon"; Transliteration: "Onaji Tsuki o Mite" (Japanese: 同じ月を見て)	Shunji Yoshida	Aki Kindaichi	Hiroyuki Shimazu	July 10, 2025
A flashback shows young Xeno meeting Stanley for the first time, impressing him by calculating a machine-gun shot's trajectory with a device he built. Grateful, Xeno offers to share his scientific genius with Stanley, forging their own lifelong bond. In the present, Senku's advance party prepares to travel towards South America while carefully avoiding Stanley and his loyal forces who are determined to pursue them across the globe. Xeno proposes joining Senku in unraveling the mystery of the original petrification beam. Senku agrees, but only under the condition that they pool their intellect equally. Back in America, Stanley and his team repair the Perseus, intending to chase down the advance party and reclaim Xeno. Onboard, the wounded Matsukaze is taken to the medical bay where he encounters a terrified Ginro hiding in secret. Before losing consciousness, Matsukaze inadvertently reveals himself as a bargaining chip. Stanley interrogates him for the group's whereabouts, but Matsukaze refuses to speak. As Stanley prepares to execute him, Ginro panics, desperate not to lose Matsukaze, and blurts out their location by accident. Meanwhile, Senku, Xeno, and Chrome collaborate to trace the petrification beam's point of origin, concluding it lies deep within the Amazon rainforest.
71	14	"Earth Race"	Nobutaka Kondō	Kurasumi Sunayama	Satoshi Shimizu	July 17, 2025
Senku reveals the advance party's true mission: constructing a superalloy city deep in the Amazon rainforest. To reach it, they must sail around South America, a long voyage requiring frequent stops for fuel and lumber, leaving them vulnerable to Stanley's pursuit. One night, Taiju and Suika notice glowing letters in the sky and fear the Why-man, but Senku and Xeno determine the lights were created using kites coated in phosphorescent paint. The next day, the group discovers a shelter and encounters a nearsighted young woman. After providing her with glasses and clothing, Xeno recognizes her as Dr. Chelsea, a talented geographer he once met at a conference she attended after Senku proved that petrified birds were real swallows. Chelsea explains she awakened three years after Senku and Xeno, but, due to poor eyesight, mistakenly traveled south. She admits to sending the glowing kites as a distress signal. Chelsea proposes a shortcut: traveling overland from Northern Ecuador, across mountains, and down the Amazon River. She also recommends building motorcycles to make trekking possible. Senku agrees and begins constructing six bikes. Chelsea also donates her kites as sails to hasten the voyage. The team then sets course for rubber trees, essential for completing the motorcycles.
72	15	"The Escape"; Transliteration: "Hōimō Toppa-sen" (Japanese: 包囲網突破戦)	Tomomi Ikeda	Aki Kindaichi	Satoshi Shimizu	July 24, 2025
Under Chelsea's guidance, the advance party searches for rubber trees near the long-blocked Panama Canal. Anticipating Stanley's pursuit, they use the mobile lab as a decoy to lure him away. However, Stanley quickly sees through the ruse, destroys the mobile lab, and resumes his course. Chelsea successfully leads the group to a rubber tree, and they collect sap from it to craft tires. With time running out, they reach Northern Ecuador and use parts from their disassembled ship to construct motorcycle frames. Just as Stanley's forces arrive to attack, the team escapes on their newly completed motorcycles, using Xeno as a human shield to disrupt enemy fire. To aid their getaway, the group creates a smokescreen, though Stanley manages to injure Tsukasa and Hyoga with a calculated shot. As Xeno signals with Morse code via blinking, Stanley sends a plane to pursue them from the air. However, the plane's engine suddenly fails, which is revealed to be sabotage by Senku who had added sugar water to the fuel tank back in America, predicting it would be reused. With Stanley's forces temporarily disabled, the advance party begins a dangerous cross-continental trek through South America, aiming for their ultimate destination: the Amazon.
73	16	"Medusa Mechanism"	Kayona Yamada	Kurasumi Sunayama	Kayona Yamada	July 31, 2025
While trekking across South America, Senku contacts the Corn City crew and instructs them to dismantle and reactivate the Medusa device recovered from Homura. This step is crucial for the advance party's ultimate goal: retrieving the original Medusa responsible for petrifying humanity thousands of years ago. Chelsea maps out the Americas, and the advance party transmits her chart to Corn City via fax and Morse code. Using the map, the Corn City crew locates and revives the former Rodex CEO who directs them to Joel, a master watchmaker. Though reluctant, Joel agrees to analyze the Medusa. Upon dismantling it, he discovers a diamond-powered central core. While reinstalling the battery, Joel accidentally activates the device and petrifies himself, leaving the battery unusable. Meanwhile, Senku's group pushes towards the Andes Mountains, the second major obstacle on their journey to the Amazon. Anticipating Stanley's pursuit in his nearly completed plane, they strive to enter the rainforest swiftly and use the trees as natural cover. Chelsea advises evenly distributed weight across their motorcycles for the climb, prompting Senku to build a balance scale. The terrain proves too harsh, so Senku decides to repurpose the bike parts into a ropeway system, enabling the team to cross the Andes.
74	17	"Sickening Yet Beautiful"; Transliteration: "Ozomashiku mo Utsukushiku" (Japanese: 悍ましくも美しく)	Osamu Nabeshima	Aki Kindaichi	Osamu Nabeshima	August 7, 2025
The advance party quickly construct their ropeway system to cross the Andes Mountains and reach the Amazon in order to avoid detection from Stanley in the Amazon rainforest. Their main concern is who to pair Hyoga and Xeno up with, given their past history with the former, but Senku decides to risk pairing them up together while crossing the mountains. While sending everyone across, a huge gust of wind blows Suika off the ropeway, but Kohaku saves her, and Hyoga helps them up, implying that he has truly reformed. The group reaches the Amazon and continues their trek through the rainforest and down the Amazon River, intending to reach Manaus, Brazil where the original petrification beam occurred. Along the way, they craft more items to overcome the various challenges of the harsh jungle, such as rubber boots and insect repellent. Furthermore, Chrome's idea of an invention capable of protecting everyone from petrification leads the group to deduce that they might find more than one Medusa device there. After traversing the jungle on foot all day, and upon discovering a Medusa device, the group finally reaches their destination and discover a huge pyramid, implied to be made out of Medusa devices.
75	18	"Diamond Heart"	Shigeki Awai	Kurasumi Sunayama	Takashi Kawabata	August 14, 2025
Upon reaching their destination, the advance party discovers a massive pile of Medusa devices, all rendered inactive by dead batteries and remnants of the ancient petrification event. Determined to restore one before Stanley arrives, Senku leads the team in dismantling the devices to study their mechanisms. Tsukasa smashes a unit to expose its interior while the group constructs a stealth ship to evade Stanley's pursuit along the Amazon. During testing, they learn that the devices can absorb radio waves, effectively masking its signal. Inspired by Chrome, they cover the entire ship with these units, greatly enhancing its stealth. Meanwhile, Senku and Xeno examine the devices more closely, discovering that each one contains a charred diamond at its core. The breakthrough draws near when Chrome finds one unblackened diamond, proving it to be relatively new. Encouraged, the team searches for similar intact stones, but most of the devices turn out to be duds caused by microscopic defects. Senku formulates a solution: swap a dud's diamond with a pristine one to potentially reactivate the Medusa. He contacts the Corn City crew, instructing them to craft a diamond using alcohol. After painstaking trial and error, they succeed in creating ultra-small diamonds, setting the stage for the Medusa's reactivation.
76	19	"Stone Sanctuary"	Nana Harada	Aki Kindaichi	Akira Nishimori	August 21, 2025
After crafting ultra-small diamonds, Senku reveals that reactivating the Medusa requires natural diamonds from Lassen Volcanic National Park, polished with synthetic diamond dust. Though the Corn City crew protests, he insists the process is crucial. He also warns that the advance party must sever communications to evade Stanley who is circling around South America and closing in fast. The advance party presses deeper into the Amazon, selecting the stone sanctuary of Araxá as the foundation for their Superalloy City. Secretly, Xeno transmits a coded message to Stanley who swiftly deciphers their location. Aware of Xeno's betrayal, Senku nonetheless chooses to confront him directly rather than discard his scientific knowledge. At Araxá, the group fortifies their position, preparing to lure Stanley's forces into a decisive showdown. Chrome devises a bold strategy: reactivate the Medusa, petrify both armies, and rely on a distant ally to safely revive their own side, guaranteeing victory. While refining the Medusa, Kaseki succeeds in opening it without damage, discovering an atomic flaw in the diamonds that reveals a potential weakness. With Stanley's army drawing closer, the advance party races against time to perfect the Medusa, setting the stage for their final confrontation.
77	20	"What I Once Sought to Destroy"; Transliteration: "Katsute Kesō to Shita Mono wa" (Japanese: かつて消そうとしたものは)	Tomomi Ikeda & Yoshinari Saitō	Aki Kindaichi	Osamu Yamasaki	August 28, 2025
Following Chrome's plan, Senku sends Suika and Francois to a safe distance, tasked with reviving the advance party after self-petrification with the reactivated Medusa. While scouting, they spot the Americans searching for the group, still holding Ginro and Matsukaze captive. Before they can return to warn the others, Charlotte, one of Stanley's operatives, is bitten by a venomous spider and paralyzed. Suika saves her with a nitroglycerin pad, but is discovered and forced to flee. Francois aids her escape by throwing a knife to Matsukaze who frees Ginro as he fights the soldiers, only to be subdued again by Stanley. Acknowledging Suika's act of kindness, Francois surrenders, and both are captured. Meanwhile, Kohaku tracks the Americans just as Tsukasa and Hyoga arrive. The Americans are soon distracted by recorded gunfire created by the advance party as a diversion. Hyoga suggests disabling their comms, giving the trio a chance to rescue their friends. They clash with the Americans; Tsukasa defeats Maya but is shot, Hyoga is fatally struck by Stanley, and Kohaku destroys the comms before being gunned down. Gravely wounded, Tsukasa entrusts Senku to activate the Medusa, hoping it can even restore the dead.
78	21	"Our Dr. Stone"	Kayona Yamada	Kurasumi Sunayama	Yui Miura	September 4, 2025
As the advance party struggles to ready the Medusa device, the American forces launch their assault on the fortress. Senku orders Luna and Chelsea to flee while the crew sustains heavy casualties. Amid the chaos, Joel contacts them with critical news: he has completed the Medusa, powered by a functional diamond battery. Relief turns to despair when Brody, having intercepted Francois' Morse code message, arrives, seizes the Medusa, and locks it inside a vault to keep it from the Corn City crew, fearing mass petrification. Senku then reveals that their only chance of victory is triggering another worldwide petrification, mirroring the original event from millennia ago. Rallying behind him, the Corn City crew launches a desperate charge against the Americans to reclaim the Medusa. Despite their determination, they are mercilessly gunned down until only Joel survives, gravely wounded. Struggling forward, he reaches for the device just as Brody smashes the vault onto his arm. Though all hope seems lost, Joel reveals he had secretly activated a transmission not from Senku, but from the Why-man itself. Speaking in Senku's voice, the Why-man remotely triggers the Medusa, unleashing a second global petrification.
79	22	"Until We Meet Again"; Transliteration: "Mata Au Hi Made" (Japanese: また逢う日まで)	Osamu Nabeshima	Aki Kindaichi	Osamu Nabeshima	September 11, 2025
As the petrification wave nears, Ukyo frees Francois, Suika, Ginro, and Matsukaze, urging them to deliver the revival fluid to Senku. Stanley fatally guns down Ukyo, Francois, Ginro, and Matsukaze, but Suika escapes with the vials. She delivers them to the advance party who places one of them inside the Medusa tower as planned. Gravely wounded, Senku entrusts humanity's future to nature, hoping the last vial will someday break and revive an ally. He tells Suika to hide in the tower's center before he and Xeno share a quiet farewell and succumb to petrification. Stanley prepares to destroy the final vial but hesitates, recalling his bond with Xeno and acknowledging that the Kingdom of Science still needs his intellect to restore civilization. Accepting defeat, he too allows himself to be petrified. Meanwhile, across Ishigami Village and Treasure Island, the survivors collapse carefully to keep their statues intact. Approximately two years later, Suika is naturally revived. Desperate to find revival fluid, she fails and collapses in despair, fearful of starving alone. Remembering Senku's determination after his revival, she steels herself and begins her objective to gather all the statues into one place, vowing to save everyone.
80	23	"Scientist, All Alone"; Transliteration: "Hitoribocchi no Saientisuto" (Japanese: ひとりぼっちのサイエンティスト)	Nana Harada	Kurasumi Sunayama	Chie Nishizawa, Satoshi Shimizu & Osamu Nabeshima	September 18, 2025
Suika begins gathering everyone's statues and placing them all together in one place despite the hard struggle, all while attempting to survive on her own. One day, Suika discovers the roadmap for the original revival fluid recipe and becomes determined to recreate it and revive everyone. While reviewing the recipe, Suika decides to choose the first two options and begins the hard process of putting the ingredients together. Her attempts fail for both options, resulting in her begrudgingly choosing the third option, which will take a much longer time to do. Suika draws her own roadmap and begins the long hard process of collecting and putting the ingredients together for the revival fluid, still determined to complete it, even if she must endure repeated attempts through trial and error. Years later, Suika, now a teenager, completes the revival fluid and successfully revives Senku who congratulates her for completing the revival fluid in just seven years.
81	24	"Whole New World"	Osamu Yamasaki	Aki Kindaichi	Satoshi Shimizu	September 25, 2025
More than seven years after the second global petrification, Senku revives and is accompanied by a now-teenage Suika. Together they spend sixteen days producing enough revival fluid to restore the rest of their allies. Emotional reunions follow: Suika embraces Kohaku who marvels at her growth while the group is relieved when Hyoga, who was killed during the American assault, returns to life. During the celebration, Ryusui declares that the Kingdom of Science will resume their grand mission of reviving all of humanity, not just those in Japan, America, and Treasure Island. Chrome overhears Senku and Tsukasa discussing a startling possibility: that petrification may not only heal wounds, but also reverse death itself, hinting at potential immortality. When Chrome considers telling everyone, Tsukasa cautions that immortality could destabilize humanity's future. Senku revives Xeno, equipping him with the earpiece first created on Treasure Island. He explains that Why-man has gone silent since the second global petrification. Recognizing that his dream of ruling humanity is now impossible, Xeno agrees to ally with Senku in building a spaceship bound for the moon. In return, the Kingdom of Science promises to eventually revive Stanley once humanity is up and running again. United at last, Senku and Xeno begin planning humanity's greatest project: confronting Why-man on the moon.
Part 3
82	25	"Future Engine"	Kim Min Seon & Yoshinari Saitō	Kurasumi Sunayama	Satoshi Shimizu	April 2, 2026
Using Argon gas, Xeno constructs a Geiger counter to detect radioactive material and rare earth metals for the spacecraft, including chrome and nickel. The team also raises the sunken Perseus to salvage the iron, which Senku alloys with chrome to produce stainless steel. As other materials are scattered across the world, Xeno begins constructing the rocket engine while Senku constructs the new Perseus. Xeno builds a machine to produce pure nickel gas so he can improve steel even further. As they have no oil to power the Perseus, Senku produces biofuel using food waste, plants, and faeces. Xeno uses steel, nickel, and other metals to produce the superalloy titanium. Xeno and Senku then successfully construct a gas turbine engine powered by bio-fuel. By necessity, the group splits into three teams. Xeno stays in Superalloy City to continue work on the engine. Taiju leads a team back to Corn City to revive their allies, and continue corn production for revival fluid, while Senku and Ryusui lead their team across the Atlantic Ocean on their new rocket powered Perseus back to Ishigami Village. During their voyage, the team deciphers a message from the Why-man via radio signals, repeatedly saying "Do you wanna die?"
83	26	"Fire"	Shinichi Fukumoto	Aki Kindaichi	Akira Nishimori	April 9, 2026
Senku reveals they are heading through the Mediterranean to Barcelona, Spain to find fluorite, while Ryusui and Francois seek olive oil, as it allows them to increase the variety of food they can cook. Senku revives many Spanish locals while Kohaku, Chrome and Ryusui capture a herd of wild bulls and cows for meat and milk, expanding their menu even further. The locals volunteer to help mine for fluorite crystals from the coast. As fluorite can be polished like glass, Senku makes a lens for a telescope powerful enough to see the moon. Senku builds a small rocket to begin test flights, but as this requires extremely accurate calculations, their next stop is India, which has the highest number of genius mathematicians. Unfortunately, they do not have enough fuel for the trip around Africa. Chrome suggests passing through the man-made Suez Canal, shortening the voyage by half. Unfortunately, using a hot air balloon and the new telescope, Chelsea confirms the canal is blocked by debris. Senku retrofits his rocket into a missile, destroying the blockage and allowing the Perseus to enter the canal. Ryusui reveals they are searching for one particular man, the greatest living mathematician.
84	27	"The Universe Is Written in the Language of Mathematics"; Transliteration: "Uchū wa Sūgaku to iu Gengo de Kakarete iru" (Japanese: 宇宙は数学という言語で書かれている)	Osamu Nabeshima	Kurasumi Sunayama	Osamu Nabeshima	April 16, 2026
Ryusui reveals that his family opened a university in India dedicated to mathematics research, so it should still be filled with hundreds of mathematicians. Arriving in India, they forage seeds for spices and herbs now growing wild everywhere, which Francois uses to make curry. Ryusui deduces that their genius target Sai would have been on his laptop on the university roof during the petrification event, making it easier for Senku and Chelsea to triangulate his current location. Upon being revived, Sai immediately runs away from Ryusui, refusing to work for him ever again since he fled to India to get away from the Nanami family. Ryusui reveals Sai is actually his older brother, Sai Nanami. It is revealed that despite his mathematical ability, Sai only ever wanted to create computer games and resisted his parent's attempts to make him study more, eventually escaping to India. As computers no longer exist in the stone world, and that it would take ten years to begin building a basic one, Sai isolates himself on the Perseus. Later, the team discovers Sai has recreated the code for Dragon Quest to alleviate his boredom. Senku realizes that Sai is exactly who they need to get to the moon and begins planning to build a computer as fast as possible.
85	28	"Dawn of the Computer"; Transliteration: "Konpyūtā no Yoake" (Japanese: コンピューターの夜明け)	Tomomi Ikeda	Aki Kindaichi	Mitsuko Kase	April 23, 2026
Taiju and his team arrive in Corn City and revive everyone, reuniting with Yuzuriha. Xeno's subordinates agree to help reach the moon. Senku explains that instead of semiconductors, they will be using parametrons, small rings of copper and zinc wrapped with wire that oscillate between electronic frequencies. By oscillating between ON and OFF, or 0 and 1 in the binary language of computers, it is possible to construct a yes/no logic circuit that can perform addition. Unfortunately, their computer requires 200,000 parametrons, which will require some automated production along with Yuzuriha and other craftspeople wrapping wires by hand. As they must send complicated circuit diagrams to each other, Xeno suggests fax machines. Using Xeno's designs, the teams build machines that communicate via radio and generate electrical currents that burn images onto sphalerite coated paper. Sai refuses to leave India, despite Ryusui's insistence that they need him. The Corn City team uses the fax machine to send a team selfie. Gen notices that the picture upsets Ryusui and Sai, with Sai revealing that they were always excluded from family photographs because they were children of mistresses. Gen suggests that Ryusui just wants to be close to his brother. Thinking back, Sai realizes that every "order" that Ryusui gave him as children was an overeager request to do something together. Sai decides to join Ryusui on the Perseus.
86	29	"The Truth About the Rocket"; Transliteration: "Roketto no Shinsō" (Japanese: ロケットの真相)	Yuka Yamato	Kurasumi Sunayama	Hiroyuki Oshima	April 30, 2026
Senku reinvents magnetic-core memory to allow the computer to store information. He crafts small doughnut shaped magnets 0.5mm wide where the North polarity is 1 and South is 0, enabling the computer to store numbers in binary. After sewing 30 million of them into large mesh grids, then wiring the mesh to Nixie tubes, the numbers will light up based on which magnets have currents running through them. With the computer finished, Senku moves on to the rocket. As this calls for aluminum, the Perseus reaches Australia to mine for bauxite, which is common in Australia's red stone. While delivering food from Corn City, Ukyo delivers Ibara's Medusa, repaired with one of Kaseki's batteries. Senku reveals that due to the threat of Why-man, they must build the rocket as quickly as possible, so there is only time to build a one-way model incapable of returning to earth, so whoever travels to the moon will be required to petrify themselves after facing Why-man, possibly for thousands of years until humanity progresses and reaches the moon to rescue them, though all their friends will be dead if they ever do make it back. Unable to stand the thought of this, Chrome is determined to construct his own rocket capable of returning to Earth, which he and Suika decide to keep secret from Senku.
87	30	"Stone to Space"	Nana Harada	Kurasumi Sunayama	Hatsuki Tsuji	May 7, 2026
Chrome and Suika beg Sai to teach them math in order to build their two-way rocket before Senku finishes the one-way rocket. Senku reveals that making aluminum requires massive amounts of electricity, which will only be possible with a hydro-electric dam. Everyone is happy to learn that the ideal location will be in Ishigami Village. They visit Indonesia to harvest rubber from rubber trees. As they will be reviving Ishigami Village, Senku reveals another reason he chose Indonesia—wild rice to feed everybody. After harvesting all they can find, they cultivate the area into a rice farm, and several weeks later harvest an even larger amount. They also visit Treasure Island to revive Soyuz, Amaryllis, and others. Upon arrival in Ishigami Village, they revive everyone, and Ruri is surprised that having been frozen in time, she and Chrome are now the same age. Everyone is disappointed when Chrome does not immediately confess to Ruri. Ruri is confused as to why there is a stone wall around their statues since it was not there before they were petrified. Suika realizes her pig Sagara and dog Chalk are still alive after ten years and built the wall to protect the statues while also having families of their own. To celebrate, Francois uses the rice to make a sushi feast. Ruri reveals that before they left, Senku had given her a secret mission, so she is able to show them a fully built concrete dam.
88	31	"Unknown Known"	Yingchen Lin	Aki Kindaichi	Susumu Nishizawa	May 14, 2026
Ryusui decides to reintroduce popular entertainment. Senku uses his cathode ray tubes to make a basic television, then constructs a device he dubs SAL 9000. He reveals Sal 9000 has 10,000 donut magnets with a CPU of 16bits and 512kilobits of memory, which when combined with punched card programming provided by Sai, results in an NES console that plays Tetris, Pac-Man and Galaga. For their safety, Senku vacuum seals the Medusa in a glass case inside a steel safe, but it suddenly activates on its own, petrifying Gen and Yo. They are quickly revived and explain they heard the glass break, then a click, then a flash of light. Unsure how Why-man activated the Medusa, Senku removes the battery. Chelsea suggests the activation could have been programmed months or years ago. Senku adds even more security by mixing Selenium with Arsenic and Tellurite painted onto glass, which converts light passing through it into electrical signals. By sending these signals to the television, Senku reinvents the security camera, letting them watch the Medusa from a safe distance. Ryusui realizes this is live television, and before long, the various cities across the world are now broadcasting live news and sports to each other. Senku reveals his plan to launch a satellite with a camera to find Why-man's exact location on the moon.
89	32	"Challengers of Science"; Transliteration: "Kagaku no Chōsen-sha" (Japanese: 科学の挑戦者)	Yasuro Tsuchiya	Kurasumi Sunayama	Hatsuki Tsuji	May 21, 2026
Senku explains that due to free fall in zero gravity, the Senku-1 satellite does not require fuel, but it still requires electricity, so he constructs solar panels from magnesium, gold, copper, selenium and glass. Soyuz and his team build a launch pad on Treasure Island to launch the satellite with Xeno's engine. Unfortunately, the rocket crashes, with Xeno discovering that metal corrosion caused an engine misfire. They spend weeks repairing the damage for a second launch, but the second, third, fourth, fifth and sixth rockets all fail due to similar small issues. Chrome and Suika watch every single step, learning from their mistakes. After months of failures, the Senku-7 reaches space. Chrome and Suika realize that a rocket capable of returning to Earth needs to be five times larger. Senku takes satellite images of the moon, and with her perfect vision, Kohaku locates an unnatural structure, revealed to be Why-man. Having run out of time, Chrome reveals that his plan involves building a return rocket in several pieces, launching them like satellites, and assembling them in space. Senku and Xeno reveal that NASA rejected the same idea because the design was impossibly complex. Chrome demands a democratic vote, and the decision is made to build the return rocket. As the return rocket will require input from everybody around the globe, they require a more complex means of communication, so Senku decides to reinvent the Internet.
90	33	"Wanting Everything"; Transliteration: "Subete ga Hoshikute" (Japanese: 全てが欲しくて)	Yuka Yamato & Yūki Taki	Aki Kindaichi	Tetsuo Hirakawa	May 28, 2026
Senku demands they find the Eucommia tree, which has some of the stickiest sap in nature, like rubber only stronger, and that it can resist both water and electricity. Chrome deduces that Senku is making under sea cables to connect the cities. With conference-calling now possible, the modern engineers can have complicated conversations and share their rocket designs in real time. Xeno reveals that there will only be space for three astronauts, and for safety, they must spend almost the entire trip in statue form. As they are unsure what challenges await them, they decide to send a pilot, a scientist, and a warrior. Ryusui insists on being the pilot, and Senku is naturally chosen as the scientist. Yuzuriha reunites with Taiju. The only two options for the warrior are Tsukasa and Kohaku. After a short duel, Kohaku is chosen as she is more agile and weighs less so she is more suitable for fights on Moon and there is less strain on the engine. In case Why-Man attacks the rocket with Medusas, they fit the rocket with two anti-Medusa weapons; Resurrection Watches, built by Joel so the astronauts can set the watches to release one dose of revival fluid seconds after they are petrified. They also plan to use a net/grenade gun which can trap the Medusas in a net, then explode them before they activate. Ryusui is forced to admit to himself that there is only one man who is both a superior pilot and a superior marksman who should be going to the moon instead of him: Stanley Snyder.
91	34	"Countdown"	Tomomi Ikeda	Kurasumi Sunayama	Hiroyuki Oshima	June 4, 2026
Senku reluctantly agrees that Stanley is more suitable for their mission to confront Why-Man on the moon. Xeno agrees to act as a hostage, whom Tsukasa may kill if Stanley betrays them. As a professional soldier, Stanley, after being revived, agrees to fly the rocket to the moon. In private, Ryusui is upset that he will not be going to the moon. Senku creates spacesuits from vinyl. As there is still time before the launch, Senku recreates many modern conveniences, including the microwave, and a washing machine. Taiju jokingly requests a smartphone and is amazed that Senku can make an LCD touchscreen. By mixing toluene with petroleum, Senku makes a liquid crystal for the screen which lets light pass through until electricity is applied, causing the liquid crystal to block light instead. By applying vinyl over the LCD, electricity will pass through whenever they press on it with their fingertip, making it possible to play games and send text messages via touch screen. Kaseki and Joel place a new diamond battery in the Medusa which Senku uses to petrify himself, Kohaku, and Stanley in the rocket. Xeno carefully monitors the rocket systems during the countdown. Once again awake inside his statue form, Senku entrusts Xeno in keeping them safe. The world then celebrates 9 minutes after the launch as the rocket safely reaches space.
92	35	"Giant Step"	Osamu Nabeshima	Aki Kindaichi	Osamu Nabeshima	June 11, 2026
Senku's watch revives him, but not the others. Xeno admits that he tampered with their watches, granting Senku a minute alone to process that; like Byakuya before him, he made it to space. Upon reviving, Stanley connects their command module to the life support module. An electrical malfunction damages the LCD, making connection to the service module difficult. Senku discovers a hair caught in the circuit board that was petrified during the launch, causing a short-circuit. The board blows, turning off the LCD. Without a replacement board, they cannot steer the ship. The lunar module begins steering itself towards them, and Senku realizes that Ryusui stowed away on it, refusing to miss his chance to reach space. Senku claims that steering should be impossible as the lunar module has no reaction wheel, a spinning device that generates momentum to steer. Ryusui reveals that he strapped himself to a disc and started spinning, thus becoming a human reaction wheel. The lunar module connects and Senku replaces the board with one from the lunar module. The four petrify themselves for the long trip and revive upon entering lunar orbit. Ryusui volunteers to stay on the ship, allowing Senku to join Kohaku and Stanley on the moon. The lunar module lands, and when they set foot on the moon's surface, Senku declares it is "One giant step forward for humanity".
93	36	"Why-Man"	Nana Harada	Kurasumi Sunayama	Hiroyuki Oshima	June 18, 2026
After landing on the moon, Senku, Kohaku, and Stanley search the Taurus–Littrow valley for Why-man. During the mission, Why-man imitates Senku's voice to trick Kohaku into opening the Medusa capsule, but Stanley notices the deception. Kohaku hurls the capsule far away before it can fully activate. They soon discover that Why-man is not a single being, but a colony of Medusa devices, including the capsule they carried. Xeno concludes that Why-man's purpose is to grant intelligent life eternal existence through petrification. Why-man explains that it identifies advanced civilizations by detecting radio waves, first petrifying the swallows as a test before targeting humanity from South America. Overtime, most of the Medusa devices corroded in Earth's oxygen, leaving the survivors on the Moon. Centuries later, signals from Treasure Island’s polished crystals and antenna-like ornaments attracted their attention again. But Why-man became disappointed when humans neither maintained the Medusas nor replaced their power sources. Senku's radio transmissions convinced them that humanity had rejected petrification in favor of scientific progress, prompting Earth's second petrification. Declaring that science still has limitless potential, Senku rejects Why-man's philosophy and proposes a one-on-one negotiation to decide humanity's future once and for all.
94	37	"Ushers of an Exhilarating Future"; Transliteration: "Mirai o Sosoru Mono" (Japanese: 未来を唆るもの)	Shūhei Matsushita	Kurasumi Sunayama	Satoshi Shimizu	June 25, 2026
Senku proposes a final negotiation with Why-man, arguing that humanity and the Medusas should cooperate to advance science together. The other Medusas reject the idea, deeming humanity unworthy and preparing to petrify Earth once more before seeking out a new intelligent species. Although Stanley appears ready to attack, the Medusas anticipate him, despite his intention to avoid escalating the conflict. Why-man insists the chance of success is 0%, but Senku argues it is merely close to zero, a possibility worth pursuing. While the colony departs the moon to search the cosmos for intelligent life after declining Senku's proposition, one Medusa remains behind, choosing to believe in Senku's vision. With the threat gone, Senku, Kohaku, Stanley and Ryusui return to Earth as heroes. Over the following years, civilization flourishes. Ryusui leads global reconstruction, Tsukasa safeguards public safety, Ukyo joins the new government, Gen becomes a foreign diplomat, and Taiju and Yuzuriha marry well launching a fashion company with their friends. Meanwhile, Senku, Chrome, Suika, Kaseki, Joel and Xeno continue pushing scientific boundaries. When their friends visit the laboratory, they discover the team's ultimate project; a time machine. instead of accepting history, Senku intends to travel to the past and prevent humanity's first petrification, saving billions of lives. No matter how long it takes, the scientists vow to uncover new laws of the universe and use science to create humanity’s brightest possible future.

== Home media release ==
=== Japanese ===
Toho Animation (Japan – Region 2/A)
Box		Discs	Episodes	Release date	Ref.
4th Season	1	3	1–12	June 18, 2025	
4th Season	2	2	13–24	December 17, 2025	
4th Season	3	2	25–37	July 15, 2026	

=== English ===
Crunchyroll LLC (North America – Region 1/A)
Part		Episodes	Release date	Ref.
Season 4	1	1–12	June 29, 2026	
