= Dr. Stone season 1 =

2019 Japanese television season

Dr. Stone
- Season 1
- First Japanese home media volume, featuring the main characters of the prologue story arc
- No. of episodes: 24

Release
- Original network: Tokyo MX
- Original release: July 5 – December 13, 2019

Season chronology
- Next → S2: Stone Wars

Dr. Stone is an anime television series produced by TMS Entertainment based on the manga series of the same name written by Riichiro Inagaki and illustrated by Boichi. Set 3,700 years after a mysterious light turns every human on the planet into stone, genius boy Senku Ishigami emerges from his petrification into a "Stone World" and seeks to rebuild human civilization from the ground up. The series is directed by Shinya Iino, with Yuichiro Kido as scriptwriter, and Yuko Iwasa as character designer. Tatsuya Kato, Hiroaki Tsutsumi, and Yuki Kanesaka compose the series' music.

The first season aired from July 5 to December 13, 2019, on Tokyo MX and other networks. The first season ran for 24 episodes. The season is streamed by Crunchyroll worldwide outside of Asia, while then-separate company Funimation produced a simuldub. The English dub of the first season aired on Adult Swim's Toonami programming block from August 25, 2019, to February 22, 2020.

Used from episodes 1–13: the first opening theme song is "Good Morning World!" performed by Burnout Syndromes, while the first ending theme song is "Life" performed by Rude-α. Used from episodes 14–24: the second opening theme song is "Sangenshoku" (三原色; lit. 'Primary Colors') performed by Pelican Fanclub, while the second ending theme song is "Yume no Yō na" (夢のような; lit. 'Like a Dream') performed by Saeki YouthK.

== Episodes ==
No. overall	No. in season	Title	Directed by (Note: Production staff information is taken from the ending credits of each episode)	Storyboarded by	Original release date	English air date
1	1	"Stone World"	Shinya Iino	Shinya Iino	July 5, 2019	August 25, 2019
After five years of infatuation, Taiju Oki is about to confess his love to fellow student Yuzuriha Ogawa. Suddenly a green light turns every human on the planet into stone and 3,700 years later, nature has taken over. Taiju manages to break free from his imprisonment. After finding the tree in Yuzuriha's petrified state is in, he soon meets up with his genius friend Senku Ishigami, who had awoken six months earlier. As the only two humans freed from stone, Senku seeks to rebuild civilization in this "stone world" using his knowledge of science and Taiju's brawn to help him develop a nital solution out of a miracle water made from bat guano that could free people from their petrified state. After a year of development, the two friends created a successful blend of "revival fluid".
2	2	"King of the Stone World"	Nana Harada	Yuu Kou & Yūki Ukai	July 12, 2019	September 1, 2019
Senku and Taiju prepare enough revival fluid to free one person from stone, with Taiju choosing Yuzuriha to be the first subject. However, they are suddenly chased by a group of hungry lions, leading them to instead revive the strongest fighter in their town, Tsukasa Shishio, to fight them off. Tsukasa killed the male lion and skins it to add to his attire. As Tsukasa proves to be a valuable hunter, providing food for the trio, Senku assigns Taiju with harvesting seashells and grinding them into calcium carbonate as a first step towards advancing civilization. However, Tsukasa reveals to Senku his intention to murder petrified adults to create a world free of corrupt adults, clashing with Senku's ideals of reviving everyone.
3	3	"Weapons of Science"; Transliteration: "Kagaku no Buki" (Japanese: 科学の武器)	Hideaki Oba	Hideaki Oba	July 19, 2019	September 8, 2019
Aware of Tsukasa's murderous intent, Senku sends him away to the source of the revival fluid while he and Taiju make a batch of revival fluid to revive Yuzuriha finally. Needing weapons of science to stop Tsukasa's murder spree, Senku and the others begin traveling towards Hakone, with Yuzuriha managing to find the Great Buddha of Kamakura to serve as a landmark. The trio eventually arrive at a volcanic hot spring, giving Senku the means to create gunpowder.
4	4	"Fire the Smoke Signal"; Transliteration: "Noroshi o Agero" (Japanese: 狼煙をあげろ)	Oyunam	Osamu Nabeshima	July 26, 2019	September 15, 2019
After Senku creates a successful batch of gunpowder, which Taiju accidentally sets alight, the group spots a different source of smoke in the distance, suggesting other survivors. Senku decides to light the gunpowder further to use as a smoke signal, leading Tsukasa to find him and use Yuzuriha as a hostage to obtain the recipe for the revival fluid. As Senku relinquishes the recipe to save Yuzuriha and is given the choice of either abandoning science or dying, he recalls how he developed his love of science and became friends with Taiju. Refusing to abandon science, Senku prepares to die at Tsukasa's hands.
5	5	"Stone World the Beginning"	Tomomi Ikeda	Yuu Kou & Yūki Ukai	August 2, 2019	September 22, 2019
With Senku seemingly killed after Tsukasa delivers a fatal blow to his neck, Taiju, and Yuzuriha use his gunpowder to set off an explosion around Tsukasa, allowing them to escape. Realizing that Senku wouldn't simply sacrifice himself, Taiju and Yuzuriha discover a spot of petrification remaining on his neck, allowing them to heal the fatal injury by using the revival fluid to turn the petrification back to healthy flesh. Meanwhile, a flashback shows how Senku first emerged from his petrification and developed the tools needed to survive.
6	6	"Two Nations of the Stone World"; Transliteration: "Ishi no Sekai no Futatsu no Kuni" (Japanese: 石の世界の二つの国)	Nana Harada	Yuu Kou & Yūki Ukai	August 9, 2019	October 5, 2019 (Note: Adult Swim premiered episodes 6 and 7 of Dr. Stone at 11:30 p.m. and 12:00 a.m. EDT/PDT, respectively, on the night of October 5–6, 2019. While episode 6 actually aired on Saturday night, episode 7 effectively aired on Sunday morning.)
The flashback continues, showing how Senku found Taiju and began work on un-petrifying him. Back in the present, Senku successfully revives thanks to the revival fluid, leading him to become more curious about the fluid's regenerative properties. To this end, Senku sends Taiju and Yuzuriha to infiltrate Tsukasa's army as spies while he searches for new allies. Meanwhile, a mysterious girl named Kohaku attempts to attack Tsukasa, who traps her under a tree before heading towards the miracle water cave. Discovering Kohaku after Tsukasa has left, Senku manages to use his science know-how to create a block and tackle to lift the tree off of Kohaku.
7	7	"Where Two Million Years Have Gone"; Transliteration: "Ni-hyaku-man-nen no Arika" (Japanese: 200万年の在処)	Kentarō Kawajiri & Osamu Nabeshima	Osamu Nabeshima	August 16, 2019	October 6, 2019
Kohaku takes Senku back to her village, where he meets guards Kinro and Ginro and a sorcerer named Chrome. Although Chrome's attempts at sorcery fail to prove himself superior, Senku realizes Chrome's sorcery is actually the primitive beginning of the Stone World's first scientific discoveries. Impressed with how far Chrome has come on his own Senku makes him his apprentice. Learning that Chrome became a sorcerer to help Kohaku's sickly sister, Ruri, Senku tells him about the world that existed 3,700 years ago and decides to help him develop an antibiotic to save Ruri.
8	8	"Stone Road"	Hideaki Oba	Hideaki Oba	August 23, 2019	October 13, 2019
As Senku, Kohaku, and Chrome begin searching for the elements needed to create an antibiotic, they are aided by another villager named Suika. Needing more manpower to turn ironsand into iron, the gang sends Suika to gain intel on what the villagers want. Finding food to be a common theme of the villager's wants, Senku manages to use foxtail millet to recreate ramen to win them over.
9	9	"Let There Be the Light of Science"; Transliteration: "Kono Te ni Kagaku no Hi o" (Japanese: この手に科学の灯を)	Tomomi Ikeda	Norihiro Naganuma	August 30, 2019	October 20, 2019
During their ramen patronage, the gang are approached by Gen Asagiri, a revived magician from Senku's time, who had been sent by Tsukasa to confirm Senku's death but claims he will give a false report instead. Using the completed iron, Senku takes advantage of a sudden thunderstorm to turn it into powerful magnets. While Gen uses his street magic to ward off a violent villager named Magma, the gang uses the magnets to build a power generator which they manage to convince Kinro and Ginro to operate, leading to the reinvention of the lightbulb.
10	10	"A Flimsy Alliance"; Transliteration: "Usuppera no Dōmei" (Japanese: 薄っぺらの同盟)	Kentarō Kawajiri & Yūsuke Onoda	Kentarō Kawajiri	September 6, 2019	October 27, 2019
While recalling the time he was first revived by Tsukasa, Gen is suddenly attacked by a mysterious assailant, barely managing to survive thanks to fake blood bags he had protected himself with. Learning that the culprit was Magma, who believed that Gen was the sorcerer instead of Senku, Kohaku reveals that Magma did so to win the Grand Bout, a tournament Kohaku has previously beaten him in to keep him from marrying Ruri and becoming village elder. As Kohaku, Kinro, and Ginro train for the Grand Bout, Gen gives a false report to Tsukasa after Senku promises to make him a bottle of cola.
11	11	"Clear World"	Nana Harada	Hideto Komori	September 13, 2019	November 3, 2019
Senku uses quartz sand to produce glass, which he uses to create glasses for the short-sighted Suika. Lacking the skills needed to glassblow useable lab utensils, Chrome brings in a skilled craftsman named Kaseki, who is able to quickly adapt to the unfamiliar substance. To break into their new lab, Senku offers to make Ginro a silver spear as part of a dangerous mission.
12	12	"Buddies Back to Back"; Transliteration: "Senaka Awase no Nakama-tachi" (Japanese: 背中合わせの仲間たち)	Hideaki Oba	Shunsuke Machitani	September 20, 2019	November 10, 2019
The silver spear made by Senku is revealed to be a sensor to detect poisonous gases coming from a pool of sulfuric acid, which they need for the antibiotic. Knowing the risks involved, Senku offers to teach Chrome everything he knows about science on the off-chance that he dies, but Chrome refuses, instead proposing a tag-team style approach. While gathering the acid using special gas masks, Chrome nearly falls into the pool but is saved by Ginro, who overcomes his fear and helps the duo obtain a bottle of the acid.
13	13	"Masked Warrior"; Transliteration: "Kamen no Senshi" (Japanese: 仮面の戦士)	Atsuji Kaneko	Kentarō Kawajiri	September 27, 2019	November 17, 2019
With their base ingredients obtained, Senku and the others begin producing the other elements for the antibiotic. Needing alcohol for the remaining elements, Senku ends up joining the others in the Grand Bout, which offers alcohol for the winner. Upon arriving in the village for the Grand Bout, Senku is greeted by Ruri, who appears to know his name from somewhere. Magma's henchman, Mantle, kidnaps Suika, ties her to a tree, and tells Kohaku that Suika is drowning, prompting Kohaku to run off even while knowing he's lying. As Kinro faces off against Magma in the first round, Suika, managing to escape her captivity and noticing Kinro struggling with his vision, gives him her mask containing the lenses of her glasses, allowing him to see more clearly and beat Magma.
14	14	"Master of Flame"	Osamu Nabeshima	Hideaki Oba	October 4, 2019	November 24, 2019
Magma tricks Kinro into consulting the referee so he can attack from behind and win the match for himself. He then has Mantle throw his match against Chrome in order to disqualify Kohaku, who fails to get back in time. Faced in a one-sided semi-final match against Magma, Chrome uses his own tears with Suika's glasses to create a magnifying lens that can start a fire. Needing to buy time, Gen returns and uses his "sorcery" to distract Magma long enough for Chrome to set fire to Magma's clothes and win the match.
15	15	"The Culmination of Two Million Years"; Transliteration: "Ni-hyaku-man-nen no Kesshō" (Japanese: 200万年の結晶)	Tomomi Ikeda	Osamu Nabeshima	October 11, 2019	December 8, 2019
Following Chrome's match, Ginro informs Ruri he and Senku would throw their matches so Chrome and her could be together. When Ruri says she'll marry whoever wins and won't pick a side, Ginro is determined to win against Senku and be the new chief which everyone fears. After running from Ginro, Senku uses Chrome's weapon to hit Ginro's groins to win the match, just before Chrome passes out. As a result of Chrome passing out before the final match, Senku is declared as Ruri's husband but immediately divorces her once he gets the alcohol he needs. After working over the night, the gang finally completes their sulfa drug and gives it to Ruri. With Ruri's illness revealed to be pneumonia, the sulfa drugs prove to be effective and Ruri makes a full recovery. As thanks, Senku is declared the new chief of the village, which is revealed to be named Ishigami Village, after which Ruri reveals that she knew of Senku beforehand.
16	16	"A Tale for the Ages"; Transliteration: "Ikusen-nen Monogatari" (Japanese: 幾千年物語)	Nana Harada	Shunsuke Machitani	October 18, 2019	December 15, 2019
Ruri reveals that she learned of Senku's name through a tale passed down to her by her mother. The tale speaks of Senku's father, Byakuya, who became an astronaut after Senku made an electric suit to help him pass the swimming exam for JAXA. Five years after passing his exams, Byakuya travels to the International Space Station, alongside cosmonaut Shamil Volkov and American songstress Lillian Weinburg, joining fellow crew members Connie, Dalia, and Yakov. During their stay, Byakuya and the crew witness the phenomenon that turned everyone on Earth into stone, leaving them as the only six humans left.
17	17	"A Hundred Nights and a Thousand Skies"; Transliteration: "Hyaku no Yoru to Sen no Sora" (Japanese: 百の夜と千の空)	Nana Harada & Kentarō Kawajiri	Ikuo Morimoto	October 25, 2019	January 4, 2020 (Note: Adult Swim moved Dr. Stone from 12:00 a.m. to 11:30 p.m. EST/PST, making the airing dates from episodes 17 to 24 actually on Saturday night.)
After Byakuya deduces that the phenomenon originated in South America, Shamil, Lillian, and Connie venture down to the surface, but wind up in the middle of the ocean, prompting Byakuya and the others to go down and rescue them. The six begin living together on a nearby island, forming relationships and raising children together. As the crew starts to gradually die from pneumonia, however, Byakuya writes down the "Hundred Tales" to pass essential knowledge down to future generations in the hope that Senku will one day be able to use them. Back in the present, Ruri takes Senku to the village cemetery where Byakuya lies, relaying Byakuya's final message to Senku that the Hundred Tales is a scientific gift for him. Afterward, Gen warns Senku and the others that Tsukasa and his army are coming.
18	18	"Stone Wars"	Hideaki Oba	Hideaki Oba	November 1, 2019	January 11, 2020
A group of Tsukasa's army, led by a man named Hyoga, approaches the village and beats down Kinro. With Ginro unwilling to cut down the bridge to the village with Kinro still on it, Senku, with the aid of Gen and Magma, convinces Hyoga's group that they've already produced guns, forcing them to retreat. Three days later, during a storm where guns would be unusable, Hyoga's team attacked again, only to discover that Senku and the villagers had managed to produce katanas. Although Hyoga proves to be a powerful foe with his spear technique, the spear breaks thanks to some sneaky sabotage by Gen.
19	19	"To Modernity"; Transliteration: "Soshite Gendai e" (Japanese: そして現代へ)	Shunji Yoshida	Daiki Maezawa	November 8, 2019	January 18, 2020
Hyoga reveals that his attack was merely a distraction so his ally, Homura, could sneak in and set fire to the village, forcing the villagers out into the open. Wanting to protect the kingdom of science, Suika manages to successfully lure Hyoga's troops away from the village and strand him and Homura above the poisonous gases from the acid pool. Hyoga pushes three of his minions off the tree where they are killed by the poisonous gases. Aiming to attack Tsukasa's army before it grows too big, Senku sets his sights on reinventing the cellular phone. Meanwhile, Hyoga reports to Tsukasa that Senku is still alive.
20	20	"The Age of Energy"; Transliteration: "Dōryoku no Jidai" (Japanese: 動力の時代)	Shizutaka Sugahara & Tomomi Ikeda	Sakura Koyama	November 15, 2019	January 25, 2020
Senku and Ishigami Village begin work on the cell phone, planning to complete its construction by spring. To manufacture gold filaments for wiring, Senku creates a cotton candy machine to test with sugar. Senku brings cotton candy to Homura, who has been spying on the Kingdom of Science. After running into imperfections making filaments, Senku develops a gear train for the cotton candy machine, inspiring Chrome to construct a waterwheel with Kaseki. Senku then connects the waterwheel to the power generator, turning it into a hydroelectric power plant.
21	21	"Spartan Crafts Club"; Transliteration: "Suparuta Kōsaku Kurabu" (Japanese: スパルタ工作クラブ)	Tetsuji Nakamura & Osamu Nabeshima	Osamu Nabeshima	November 22, 2019	February 1, 2020
With electricity now available, Senku mechanizes the ironmaking process, freeing up the villagers to prepare for winter. Meanwhile, Senku, Chrome, and Kaseki begin developing light bulbs, allowing them to celebrate Christmas by decorating a tree. Chrome uses the new invention to explore deeper in caves, where he finds a host of new minerals. Senku and Kaseki attempt to create a vacuum tube, but they cannot find a filament that can withstand the heat. During a New Year's sunrise, Senku notices Suika holding scheelite, and realizes tungsten is the solution to the filament issue, so he employs himself, Chrome, and Magma on a spelunking expedition.
22	22	"The Treasure"	Nana Harada & Tomochi Kosaka	Daiki Maezawa	November 29, 2019	February 8, 2020
In the search for tungsten, Senku, Chrome, and Magma search for a nearby cave. After encountering a mica vein, Magma tries to save Senku from falling into a sinkhole, but both eventually are trapped. Chrome saves them both by filling the sinkhole with water. The three hurriedly return to the village after encountering a deposit rich with minerals to make it in time to celebrate Senku's birthday. While the three were gone, Gen and the village built an observatory for Senku.
23	23	"Wave of Science"; Transliteration: "Kagaku no Nami" (Japanese: 科学の波)	Kentarō Kawajiri, Hideaki Oba, & Shinya Iino	Kentarō Kawajiri, Hideaki Oba, & Shinya Iino	December 6, 2019	February 15, 2020
Senku unveils the pile of scheelite for final preparation. After being crushed into a fine powder, the tungsten within needs to be heated at an extremely high temperature for it to become usable. While Senku readies the tungsten powder, he charges Chrome and Kaseki to create a method of pinpointing high-temperature heating using everything they have learned since Senku arrived in the village. Once the tungsten filament is created, everyone splits into groups to complete the remaining tasks; Suika and her friends finish twining the gold wire, Senku and Chrome create the necessary plastic, Kinro, Ginro, and Kohaku burn coal for its ash and make a microphone, and Gen and Ruri create zinc-carbon batteries. They all finish their tasks and Senku puts it all together, creating the first modded cell phone in the new world.
24	24	"Voices Over Infinite Distance"; Transliteration: "Koe wa Mugen no Kanata e" (Japanese: 声は無限の彼方へ)	Tomomi Ikeda & Shinya Iino	Ikuo Morimoto & Shinya Iino	December 13, 2019	February 22, 2020
To the villagers' dismay, Senku informs them they require two cell phones for full functionality. After testing the cell phone across a wire, Ruri tells Senku of one of the Hundred Tales, hinting towards a time capsule sealed in Byakuya's gravestone: a glass record. Byakuya intended to create a record to communicate with Senku across millennia. Using a phonograph he reconstructed, Senku and the villagers can hear the voices of the astronauts for the first time since petrification as well as a song from Lillian. The song inspires the villagers to recreate the entertainment of the modern world. With the support of the village and the cell phone, Senku declares a stone war against Tsukasa. Taiju and Yuzuriha wait for Senku to complete his part of the plan as Yuzuriha prevents Taiju from blowing their cover. Tsukasa and Hyouga prepare for the upcoming attack on Ishigami Village.

== Home media release ==
=== Japanese ===
Toho Animation (Japan – Region 2/A)
Volume	Episodes	Artwork	Release date	Ref.
1	1–4	Yuzuriha Ogawa, Senku Ishigami and Taiju Oki	October 16, 2019	
2	5–8	Senku Ishigami and Tsukasa Shishio	November 20, 2019	
3	9–12	Senku Ishigami, Ginro, Kinro, Chrome and Kohaku	December 18, 2019	
4	13–16	Senku Ishigami, Ruri and Chrome	January 22, 2020	
5	17–20	Senku Ishigami, Kaseki, Suika and Gen Asagiri	February 19, 2020	
6	21–24	Byakuya Ishigami and Senku Ishigami	March 18, 2020	

=== English ===
Crunchyroll LLC (North America – Region 1/A)
Part		Episodes	Regular edition release date	Limited edition release date	Ref.
Season 1	1	1–12	September 22, 2020	N/A	
Season 1	2	13–24	December 1, 2020		
Season 1	SteelBook	1–24	December 14, 2021	N/A	
