= Dr. Stone season 2 =

2021 Japanese television season

Dr. Stone: Stone Wars
- Season 2
- Japanese cover art for the lone home media box set of Dr. Stone: Stone Wars as released by Toho Animation
- No. of episodes: 11

Release
- Original network: Tokyo MX, KBS
- Original release: January 14 – March 25, 2021

Season chronology
- ← Previous; Season 1 Next → S3: New World

Dr. Stone is an anime television series produced by TMS Entertainment based on the manga series of the same name written by Riichiro Inagaki and illustrated by Boichi. Set 3,700 years after a mysterious light turns every human on the planet into stone, genius boy Senku Ishigami emerges from his petrification into a "Stone World" and seeks to rebuild human civilization from the ground up.

Dr. Stone's second season, titled Dr. Stone: Stone Wars, aired from January 14 to March 25, 2021. The season premiered on Tokyo MX and KBS in a dual simulcast, with other networks following at later timeslots. It focuses on the story of the "Stone Wars" arc from the manga, in which Senku and the Ishigami villagers of the Kingdom of Science go to war with Tsukusa's Kingdom of Strength. The season is streamed by Crunchyroll worldwide outside of Asia, while then-separate company Funimation produced a simuldub. The season ran for 11 episodes. A sequel was announced after second season finale. The English dub for Stone Wars aired on Adult Swim's Toonami programming block from May 16 to July 25, 2021.

The opening theme song is "Rakuen" (楽園; lit. 'Paradise') performed by Fujifabric, while the ending theme song is "Koe?" (声?; lit. 'Voice?') performed by Hatena.

== Episodes ==
No. overall	No. in season	Title	Directed by (Note: Production staff information is taken from the ending credits of each episode)	Storyboarded by	Original release date	English air date
25	1	"Stone Wars Beginning"	Nana Harada	Shinya Iino	January 14, 2021	May 16, 2021
Senku decides to make space food, so that they can eat during the war with Tsukasa. With the help of Chrome and Kaseki, he utilizes freeze drying to make cup ramen. That night Senku, Gen and Chrome decide to fool the Tsukasa Empire soldiers with the record of Lillian's voice, in order to raise their hopes about someone trustworthy out there. In the morning, Chrome, Gen and Magma prepare to go near the battlefield to set the phone. They make a blast with sound bombs in the forest to distract Homura, a member of Tsukasa Empire. The plan works and the three run towards the battlefield. Note: Due to the COVID-19 pandemic, Funimation added a disclaimer at the beginning of each episode stating that the English dub voice actors were able to record their lines from the safety of their homes. This disclaimer is played weekly before the English dub broadcast.
26	2	"Hot Line"	Kentarō Kawajiri	Kentarō Kawajiri	January 21, 2021	May 23, 2021
Gen, Chrome, and Magma embark on taking the phone to Taiju and Yuzuriha. As Homura is lured in by the sounds of the bombs, Kohaku moves to catch her. Kohaku starts chasing Homura, and a flashback of Homura's past as a gymnast is shown. Senku captures Homura after blinding her with a flare. However, Homura easily escapes. Homura notices the absence of Gen, Chrome, and Magma after counting the villagers. Homura is lured with a fake antenna and captured by Kohaku. The Phone-Squad finishes installing the phone at the graveyard. Taiju and Yuzuriha find the phone and establish communication with Senku.
27	3	"Call from the Dead"; Transliteration: "Shisha Kara no Denwa" (Japanese: 死者からの電話)	Osamu Nabeshima	Osamu Nabeshima	January 28, 2021	May 30, 2021
Nikki watches as Yuzuriha and Taiju visit the grave. Gen, Chrome, and Magma hide from Ukyo. Chrome starts a fire to let Gen and Magma escape, Taiju requests Nikki to hear what his friend has to say. Nikki shows surprise at seeing a phone, Gen impersonates Lillian Weinberg. However, Nikki asks "Lillian" how many CDs she's sold to know if she is real. Senku tells Gen the right answer. Nikki, still unconvinced, asks what Lillian's proportions are, after receiving an answer she realizes she's speaking to an impostor. Senku plays the recording of the real Lillian he received from Byakuya. Hearing this, Nikki agrees to cooperate with Senku.
28	4	"Full Assault"; Transliteration: "Zengun Shutsugeki" (Japanese: 全軍出撃)	Tomomi Ikeda	Shinya Iino	February 4, 2021	June 6, 2021
Nikki and Senku discuss bringing more men from Tsukasa's Empire to their side. Chrome surrenders and is captured by Ukyo. Magma returns to Ishigami Village. In the village, Kaseki finished building a wheel. Senku creates blueprints for a steam engine vehicle. Using beeswax, Senku creates a mold for pistons and other parts. At Tsukasa's headquarters, Chrome declares to teach Tsukasa how amazing science is. Hyoga dangles Chrome at the waterfall while Tsukasa interrogates him. Tsukasa wants Chrome to betray Senku and the village in exchange for Senku's head and the village's safety. When Tsukasa asks Ukyo what Chrome is doing, Ukyo lies saying he found him possibly scouting caves. Back at the village, Senku finishes making the locomotive.
29	5	"Steam Gorilla"	Kentarō Kawajiri	Kentarō Kawajiri	February 11, 2021	June 13, 2021
Chrome is imprisoned at Tsukasa's headquarters. Kaseki and the others finish making the body of the automobile, dubbing it the Steam-Gorilla. The Science Team embarks to rescue Chrome as the elderly villagers decide to remain behind. They set up camp near a cliff, Kohaku keeps watch, while Suika moves ahead to scout. Senku decides to modify the Steam-Gorilla and make it a tank. He makes Paper-Shields to armor the Steam-Gorilla. Kinro expresses disbelief at the strength of the Paper-Shield, to test it Senku asks him to attack the shield with his spear, however, Kinro's spear breaks when he attacks the shield. Senku finishes the Steam-Gorilla Tank. Tsukasa builds anti-vehicle traps, wary of Senku possibly building a vehicle.
30	6	"Prison Break"	Nana Harada	Masayuki Miyaji	February 18, 2021	June 20, 2021
Tsukasa revives Yō, a former police officer known for his strength. A flashback of Yō's previous life is shown where he was fired for killing a fleeing criminal. Chrome manages to go outside by using the need to excrete as an excuse, where he collects materials. Chrome mulls over the need for a battery to escape. Later that night someone sneaks a battery into his cell. Chrome tries to use the battery to blow up the bamboo gate. However, Yō quickly stops it. Chrome exercises to use his sweat and make "sodium hydroxide" to melt the rope holding the bamboo together, consequently Chrome avoids the anti-vehicle traps and escapes. Yō corners Chrome. However, Chrome fakes pneumonia and strikes Yō who is taken aback, escaping to Senku's hideout.
31	7	"Secret Mission"; Transliteration: "Gokuhi no Misshon" (Japanese: 極秘のミッション)	Osamu Nabeshima	Osamu Nabeshima	February 25, 2021	June 27, 2021
Senku decides to use the Steam-Gorilla to capture The Miracle Cave. Using Lillian's recording, Senku gains the trust of more of Tsukasa's men. Ukyo reveals he saw Yuzuriha's secret mission to reassemble the fragments of statues Tsukasa destroyed. Yo orders one of his subordinates to blame Chrome's escape on him, after which he gives the stone on his right eye to him and runs away. Ukyo dictates his term of "no death" with which he would cooperate with Senku, to which Senku agrees as Ukyo suspected that Hyoga sacrificed some warriors to the poison gas. Tsukasa visits the grave with Hyoga to pay respects to Yō. Senku finishes building the tank as Taiju and Yuzuriha arrive. Tsukasa discovers the phone hidden at the grave.
32	8	"Final Battle"	Nana Harada	Norihiro Naganuma	March 4, 2021	July 4, 2021
Senku is shown earlier when he first de-petrified. Taiju and Senku look back at when they woke up and where everything first started. The Kingdom of Science marches towards the miracle cave, consequently, Senku fires the gorilla-tank intending to reduce morale. Kohaku and the others begin their frontal assault, however the tank falls prey to the anti-steam vehicle traps. Magma and Chrome use their new weapon, the Sonic-Cannon, to immobilize multiple soldiers of the Tsukasa Empire. Nikki and Ukyo stop Minami from warning Tsukasa. To the surprise of Ukyo, Tsukasa and Hyoga arrive at the miracle cave where Hyoga wounds Ukyo. Kohaku and Kokuyo rush Tsukasa to make time for Senku to escape.
33	9	"To Destroy and to Save"; Transliteration: "Kowasu Mono Sukuu Mono" (Japanese: 壊すもの救うもの)	Tomomi Ikeda & Shinya Iino	Shinya Iino	March 11, 2021	July 11, 2021
As Kohaku's team fights Tsukasa and Hyoga, Senku, Gen, and Chrome try to figure out a way to make gunpowder. Chrome gets sulfuric acid from the tank, which is mixed with the nitric acid and glycerin from soap to make nitroglycerin, and subsequently dynamite. This makes Tsukasa's men surrender. Tsukasa and Senku talk out as to why the former wants to make a pure world when it is learned that he's doing it for his little sister Mirai. A flashback is shown of Tsukasa's past; his sister was deemed clinically brain dead, thus becoming comatose. He made it his life's mission to protect her, so he became a boxer at a young age. After the flashback, Senku wants a truce in exchange for reviving Mirai. Senku and his group go to the area where her former hospital was. Tsukasa discusses his beliefs and laments about his actions, but won't change his goal. Senku and his crew dig up Mirai from the area.
34	10	"Humanity's Strongest Tag Team"; Transliteration: "Jinrui Saikyō no Taggu" (Japanese: 人類最強のタッグ)	Kentarō Kawajiri	Kentarō Kawajiri	March 18, 2021	July 18, 2021
Senku demands a truce from Tsukasa in return for reviving his sister Mirai whom Tsukasa learns is alive. Using the revival-fluid, Mirai is revived. Using dynamite, Homura collapses the miracle cave after being freed by Yō. Hyoga attempts to kill Mirai. However, Tsukasa protects her and is speared instead. Senku and Tsukasa are pushed into a river while Hyoga jumps in. They wash up on the riverside. Hyoga narrates his doctrine of only the elite surviving and the mediocre perishing. However, Tsukasa quickly attacks Hyoga, assisted by Senku. Senku uses gunpowder to set Hyoga afire. However, he quickly subdues the fire using his robe. Hyoga quickly overpowers both of them. Using a makeshift taser, Senku stuns Hyoga.
35	11	"Prologue of Dr. Stone"	Nana Harada	Shinya Iino	March 25, 2021	July 25, 2021
Chrome and Tsukasa's men now unite to build a scientific civilization. Kohaku apprehends Homura while Hyoga is restrained. Gen revives a manga artist from the past. Yō returns to civilization and decides to help put back all the broken statues as a means to make up for his crimes. Senku directs how to make superglue to seal wounds. However, he reveals it's only to buy Tsukasa time. Senku decides to petrify Tsukasa to keep him alive, constructing a refrigerator. Tsukasa dies, and is frozen inside the refrigerator with his injuries still intact; Senku promises to return and revive him once he can figure out how to petrify and de-petrify him to heal the wounds. Senku calls an assembly where he announces that they will find the secret of the petrification. He also reveals that they will construct a ship to explore the world.

== Recap special ==
No. overall	No. in season	Title	Original release date
24.5	0	"Eve of the Battle Special Feature"; Transliteration: "Kaisen Zen'ya Supesharu Eizō" (Japanese: 開戦前夜スペシャル映像)	October 11, 2020
A recap special summarizing the first season plus a bonus original animation that leads-in to the second season

== Home media release ==
=== Japanese ===
Toho Animation (Japan – Region 2/A)
Title	Discs	Episodes	Release date	Ref.
2nd Season Box	4	1–11	May 26, 2021	

=== English ===
Crunchyroll LLC (North America – Region 1/A)
Title	Discs	Episodes	Regular edition release date	Limited edition release date	Ref.
Season 2	2 (BD); 2 (DVD, limited only)	1–11	March 15, 2022		
