= The Marshal King =

Japanese manga series

- Cover of the first tankōbon volume, featuring (clockwise from left): Jimmu (holding gun), Mira (wearing white hat), and Agera (with green goggles)
- Genre: Western
- Manga
- Written by: Boichi
- Published by: Shueisha
- English publisher: NA: Viz Media
- Imprint: Jump Comics
- Magazine: Shōnen Jump+
- Original run: February 7, 2025 – October 16, 2026
- Volumes: 4

The Marshal King is a Japanese manga series written and illustrated by Boichi, set in a post-apocalyptic future which resembles the Wild West. It was serialized online on Shueisha's Shōnen Jump+ service from February 2025 to October 2026.

== Plot ==
Jimmu Godspeed, son of legendary outlaw M. Godspeed, struggles to overcome his father's infamy; he seeks to collect the belongings of the first Marshal King to enforce law and order on a desolate world ruled by desperadoes.

== Characters ==
=== AGP Club ===
Jimmu Godspeed
A young, naive man whose gunfighting skills are undeniable, but he lacks social polish.
Agera Dutch Sheaffer
An observant young woman who becomes Jimmu's first follower.
Mira Abigail Black
The daughter of a famous rich Marshal, Mira was chosen to fight Jimmu in the third school challenge because of her unyielding endurance.
Nano Serizawa / Zen X 800
An android from the past who witnessed the apocalyptic end of civilization; he has since adopted his former master's name. He is powered by a miniature stellarator fusion power device embedded in his chest.

=== Marshals ===
Principal Fair Lady
Agera's grandmother, aka "The Invincible Marshal". A cyborg, she has been replaced from the neck down with a robotic body.

=== Desperadoes ===
M. Godspeed
A legendary outlaw who possessed the golden arms of the Marshal King.
Wrangler
M. Godspeed's former partner.

== Publication ==
Written and illustrated by Boichi, The Marshal King was serialized on Shueisha's Shōnen Jump+ service from February 7, 2025, to October 16, 2026. The series' chapters were compiled into four tankōbon volumes released from June 4, 2025, to November 4, 2026.

The series' chapters are published in English on Viz Media's Shonen Jump app and Shueisha's Manga Plus app.

No.	Original release date	Original ISBN	English release date	English ISBN
1	June 4, 2025	978-4-08-884603-3	August 4, 2026	978-1-9747-1687-6
Shot 001 – 007
Legendary outlaw M. Godspeed ambushes a heavily armed train laden with gold for the U.S. Central Bank; he senses his son's approach and proposes they team up. Two months later, Jimmu Godspeed, naked and starving, drags his father's coffin into Grammerly town, where the crooked sheriff proposes they kill Jimmu and collect the $10 million bounty on his father. Before they can act, a subterranean gang gets the jump on them, intent on the bounty, and they in turn are killed by Jimmu. The sole survivor, the sheriff, directs Jimmu to the Western U.S. Marshal Training Institute, where he intends to enroll. At the Institute, cocky Jimmu attracts hostile attention from the other students for his heritage; Agera Dutch Sheaffer interrupts a confrontation and takes him to Class 1-C, where he meets Mira Abigail Black, who challenges him to a fast draw competition. Agera is the only one to see that he truly won. When the Wrangler Gang raids the Institute, Jimmu saves Agera by deflecting a bullet with his right hand, then sneaks away to claim the legendary King Magnum Excalibur. M. Godspeed also had asked Wrangler, his former partner, to help Jimmu steal it; when they meet in the school's boiler room, Agera fears the worst, but Jimmu says he is a Marshal and guns down Wrangler. His goal is to claim the body parts of the first Marshal King — including Excalibur and the golden arms used by his father — to revive the King's power and end the current Age of Desperados. After he calls the arms to him and smashes Wrangler, he grabs Excalibur and fires it to defeat the raiding gang. He says farewell to the school administrators and prepares to set out alone on his quest.
2	August 4, 2025	978-4-08-884683-5	November 10, 2026	978-1-9747-1688-3
Shot 008 – 015
Before Jimmu receives his Marshal's badge, the angry faculty demand he stay for further lessons. Principal Fair Lady, the Invincible Marshal, interrupts his demands and ushers him out as they conference with Agera, who tells them how to beat him through a series of challenges: win or lose, they will award him a badge as long as he accepts. The first task is to recover a flag without using guns, simulating being out of ammunition, against the cyborg principal. Although she knocks him down, she realizes that he avoided striking her last human parts, giving him the win. The next is a fast draw contest against thirteen other gunfighters surrounding him; he succeeds by firing a dozen shots before they can fire, and taking down the last with a thrown gun. The principal volunteers to face off against eighteen, using other teachers as her backup, demonstrating that a team is more powerful than the individual and giving her the win. The final contest is also a fast draw competition, this time against Mira, but with a twist: each gunslinger must fire 20,000 shots before fighting hand-to-hand for three minutes, repeating with the shots and fighting as needed until one falls. Although Jimmu takes an early lead, Mira is the first to 20K and strikes first. When Jimmu reaches 20K, he refuses to strike her and she drops out of the contest to join his side; class 1-C erupts in celebration. Jimmu wins his badge, but returns to school for further lessons, storing the golden arms and Excalibur.
3	November 4, 2025	978-4-08-884790-0	February 2, 2027	978-1-9747-6860-8
Shot 016 – 022
As they recover from the challenges, Jimmu asks Agera to become his first companion in the Adventure of Godspeed Posse Prep Club; when asked, Mira initially refuses, but agrees to join the AGP Club. The first order of business is to earn money: Mira suggests M. Godspeed amassed a vast fortune, but Jimmu replies that he discarded the entire unethical hoard; they decide to go bounty hunting. For their first mission, the Club challenges a monster in Devil's Canyon reputed to have eaten hundreds of people. When they arrive, Jimmu's shots mysteriously deflect around the masked monster; Jimmu realizes there is a person behind the mask. As they pursue, Jimmu has the women go first and trigger the traps, which he shoots before they can harm the party. They catch up to the monster again, and the person inside, Nano Serizawa, pleads to be left alone, as he is trapped in this world from the past. When he woke up a century ago, following a long slumber, Nano encountered a group of three hostile miners who tried to kill him. After fleeing, he found a mask and wore it while defending his home against the intruding humans, earning an unsavory reputation. Pinned down by another trap, the AGP Club toss Mira to subdue and capture Nano; Jimmu realizes that Nano never killed anyone.
4	November 4, 2026	978-4-08-885296-6	—	—

=== Chapters not yet in tankōbon format ===
These chapters have yet to be published in a tankōbon volume:

- Shot 023 – 034
