= Origin (manga) =

Japanese manga series

- First tankōbon volume cover, featuring Origin
- Genre: Action; Science fiction
- Manga
- Written by: Boichi
- Published by: Kodansha
- English publisher: NA: Kodansha USA
- Magazine: Weekly Young Magazine
- Original run: September 5, 2016 – February 9, 2019
- Volumes: 10
- icon

Origin (stylized in all caps) is a Japanese manga series written and illustrated by Boichi. It was serialized in Kodansha's seinen manga magazine Weekly Young Magazine from September 2016 to February 2019, with its chapters collected in ten tankōbon volumes. In 2019, Origin won the Grand Prize at the 22nd Japan Media Arts Festival.

== Media ==
=== Manga ===
Origin, written and illustrated by Boichi, was serialized in Kodansha's seinen manga magazine Weekly Young Magazine from September 5, 2016, to February 9, 2019. Kodansha collected its chapters in ten tankōbon volumes, released from January 6, 2017, to June 6, 2019.

During their panel at Anime NYC 2022, Kodansha USA announced that they licensed the manga for a Fall 2023 release.

==== Volumes ====
No.	Original release date	Original ISBN	English release date	English ISBN
1	January 6, 2017	978-4-06-382908-2	November 21, 2023	978-1-64-729287-4
2	April 6, 2017	978-4-06-382946-4	January 16, 2024	978-1-64-729288-1
3	August 4, 2017	978-4-06-510075-2	March 19, 2024	978-1-64-729289-8
4	November 6, 2017	978-4-06-510350-0	May 28, 2024	978-1-64-729290-4
5	March 6, 2018	978-4-06-511092-8	July 30, 2024	978-1-64-729291-1
6	May 7, 2018	978-4-06-511452-0	September 3, 2024	978-1-64-729292-8
7	August 6, 2018	978-4-06-512408-6	November 12, 2024	978-1-64-729293-5
8	November 6, 2018	978-4-06-513441-2	January 14, 2025	978-1-64-729294-2
9	February 6, 2019	978-4-06-514512-8	March 18, 2025	978-1-64-729295-9
10	June 6, 2019	978-4-06-515744-2	May 20, 2025	978-1-64-729296-6

=== Film ===
In December 2023, it was announced that Kodansha and the production company Majestic Limited have closed a deal for a feature film adaptation of Origin.

== Reception ==
Origin won the Grand Prize of the Manga Division at the 22nd Japan Media Arts Festival in 2019.
