= Sun-Ken Rock =

Japanese manga series

- First tankōbon volume cover, featuring Ken Kitano

サンケンロック (Sanken Rokku)
- Genre: Gangster, martial arts
- Manga
- Written by: Boichi
- Published by: Shōnen Gahōsha
- English publisher: NA: JManga (former, digital); Crunchyroll (digital); BookWalker (digital); Manga Planet (digital); Kodama Tales (print)
- Imprint: Young King Comics
- Magazine: Young King
- Original run: April 24, 2006 – February 22, 2016
- Volumes: 25
- icon

Sun-Ken Rock (Japanese: サンケンロック, Hepburn: Sanken Rokku) is a Japanese manga series written and illustrated by Boichi. It was serialized in Shōnen Gahosha's seinen manga magazine Young King from April 2006 to February 2016, with its chapters collected in 25 tankōbon volumes. The manga has been digitally available in English by JManga (2012–2013), Crunchyroll (since 2014), BookWalker (since 2015), and Manga Planet (since 2020). Kodama Tales has licensed the manga for print publication in English, with the first volume set to be released in 2026.

The series follows Ken, a high school delinquent turned down by the girl he loved, Yumin, who promptly left Japan to become a police officer in Korea. Yearning to see the girl he loved, Ken dropped out of high school to travel to Korea and become an officer just like Yumin. Though Ken managed to travel to Korea, he found himself unable to become an officer and instead became a poor shut-in with no money or job. After saving an old man from being abused by a group gang members, he was scouted by the head of a local gang led by Tae-Soo Park, who made him the new boss.

== Plot ==
The story revolves around Ken Kitano, a man from an upper-class family that was orphaned young due to his family's involvement with the yakuza; he became a highschool delinquent known for fighting. The only thing that motivates him to take action is through his romantic affections for a classmate, Yumin. After learning she decided to move to Korea to become a police officer, Ken left his life in Japan behind and tried to follow in Yumin's footsteps; due to unforeseen circumstances, he incidentally becomes the head of a local gang and tries to hide it from Yumin. As the leader, the gang is renamed the "Sun-Ken Rock Group". At first, the gang only consisted of few members and did not even have a base.

As the story progresses, the Sun-Ken Rock Group becomes bigger as they recruited new members and take over other gangs' territories and investments. The Sun-Ken Rock Group acquires an MMORPG company, a large casino, one of the biggest television media companies in Korea, as well as garnering political favors (making them the most powerful gang in Korea). However, throughout all of this, Ken has done his best to evade revealing himself to Yumin as a gang leader as she despises gangs. Ironically, Yumin was groomed to become an advanced plant in Korea to help her yakuza group lay the foundations to expand their hold into South Korea; due to Yumin's refusal to join the "family business", their plans were stalled as various members either tried to take her back to Japan or try to get her back into yakuza control.

In between Ken's rise, he and Yumin got closer and Yumin started to have feelings for Ken. However, things were always complicated by the interference of either Ken's gang activities and/or Yumin's yakuza connections. The turning point in the story is when Yumin is kidnapped by her own group and Ken is exposed as a gang leader in his attempts to rescue her from his greatest rival, Kim Ban Phuong (a Vietnamese-Korean that has a vicious score to settle with Ken).

== Characters ==
Ken Kitano (北野堅, Kitano Ken)
Ken is a former high-school delinquent who leaves Japan to follow Yumin, his love interest. In Korea, he lives as a shut-in until saving an old man from loan sharks, leading to his recruitment into a local gang under Tae-Soo. After defeating Tae-Soo in a fight, Ken is offered leadership but initially refuses, aspiring to join the police. Manipulated into accepting, he earns loyalty through his strength and justice while concealing his role from Yumin. Orphaned at 13 due to yakuza violence, Ken later relinquishes control of his gang to protect Japan, remaining devoted to Yumin despite their separation.
Yumi "Yumin" Yoshizawa (吉沢祐美, Yoshizawa Yumi)
Yumi is a Japanese woman who moves to Korea under the alias Yumin, concealing her identity to join the organized crime police unit. Despite hating gangs due to her mother and sister's deaths in yakuza violence, she is the daughter of a yakuza boss—the same man who killed Ken's parents. Skilled in martial arts, she initially manipulates Ken to overthrow her father's syndicate but later genuinely falls for him. After being kidnapped and discovering Ken's underworld ties, she forgives him and supports his fight against Kim Ban-Phuong. Following their victory, she and Ken destroy her father's organization, but guilt over her deception leaves her tormented, even as she assumes control of the remnants.
Tae-Soo Park (朴 泰秀(パク・テス), Pak Tesu)
Tae-Soo is a Korean gangster and former leader of the Sun-Ken Rock Group, passing control to Ken after recognizing his potential. As Ken's right-hand man, he manages the gang's operations and underworld connections, often employing ruthless methods. Though loyal to Ken, their conflicting ideologies create tension over leadership. After being comatose from an attack by Kim Ban-Phuong, he later stages a coup to seize control—only to reveal it as a ruse, positioning himself as the gang's sole criminal figurehead. This allows Ken and their allies to confront the White Dragon Clan unburdened. Tae-Soo's actions ultimately shield the group from legal repercussions.
San-Dae "Pickaxe" Yang (梁 相太(ヤン・サンテ), Yan Sande)
One of the original members of Tae-Soo's gang and one of Ken's henchman. He dislikes Ken and often comes into conflict with him. While his loyalty is sometimes questionable, he is highly competitive and does not back down from a fight. He left his village when he was 16 after he had sex with a farmer's wife. Later on San-dae finds his hometown turned into a US Army base and realizes that he can never go back to his previous life. His nickname comes from the fact that he uses an actual pickaxe in combat. His past reveals that San-dae used to be a superhero/vigilante called Diago Knight and was rejected by female supervillains.
Do-Heun Chang (張 頭弘(チャン・ドゥホン), Chan Duhon)
Chang is a muscular but mild-mannered member of Ken's gang, recruited after being defeated in a fight. Despite his imposing size, he displays surprising agility, capable of evading attacks from multiple skilled opponents. He has a passion for car maintenance and Japanese cuisine. After surviving a fall from a building by landing on his vehicle, he continues serving the group. His personal milestones include losing his virginity at the Kiss Club.
San-Ki "Marin" Lee (マリン / 李 爽崎(イ・サンギ), Marin / I Sangi)
The first member of Tae-Soo's gang after the death of Tae-Soo's father long before the story begins and one of Ken's henchmen. He is loyal to both Tae-Soo and Ken. An Ex-Korean soldier, he often fights dual-handed with wrenches.
Kae-Lyn Kim (金 恵隣(キム・ヘリン), Kim Herin)
A female member of the gang, also the "cleaner" of the Sun-Ken Group. She is a weapon specialist and the 'cleaner' of the group. She mainly uses knives, and is obsessed with Ken.
Ji-Hae "Miss Yoo" Yoo
A tea house barmaid targeted by a local gang, she develops feelings for Ken after he intervenes in her troubles. Following Ken's defeat by Kim Ban-Phuong, she attempts to seduce him before returning to her hometown. There, she is assaulted and forced into prostitution by the Garugi Gang. Ken later discovers her in a brothel, where she compels him to vow control over the Pleasure District to protect its exploited women.
Oh Dal-Soo
A corrupt businessman whose son was beaten by Yang-bae and later arrested. He asks Ken to find the man behind his son's beating.
Rei Huzimi
Rei is a bodyguard of Yumin's father who saved her from her Yazuka past. He also bears a striking resemblance with Ken. He develops feelings for Yumin and is forced by her father, the boss of the Japanese Yakuza, to kill her, but is defeated by her. He later fights Ken in Ryu's office, where Ken defeats him by exploiting his desperation to be loved by Yumi.
Kim Ban-Phuong
Kim Ban-Phuong is the mixed-race son of a Korean Vietnam War veteran and a Vietnamese woman. Trained in martial arts by his father and uncle, he moves to South Korea after his father's death. There, he falls for Hae-yi, a Vietnamese woman whose suicide—following an attempted rape by her employer—drives him to murder the perpetrators and join the Garugi Gang. After defeating Ken in combat, he vanishes, only to resurface leading an assassin guild allied with the White Dragon Clan. He exposes Ken's gang ties to Yumin but ultimately dies protecting Ken and Yumin from her father's forces.
Bae-Dal
A former monk turned casino director who trained Ken and his group for ten months. Enjoying the luxury, he eventually loses his touch but stills proves to be a contender.
Benito Armani (ベニト・アルマーニ, Benito Arumāni)
An Italian man who is a failed pornographic actor. He is a ladies man and is next in line to a powerful Italian Mafia. He is quite agile, but uses this skill mostly to escape. He joined Ken's gang with blessings from the mafia, with the hidden agenda to kill Ken if he grows too powerful. Although he is quite the ladies' man, he is troubled by premature ejaculation. He has recently been forced to return to Italy due to the death of Don Prego so that he can succeed the aforementioned Don, though he still values the time he spent with Ken and the others.
Sun
A famous K-Pop singer who Ken becomes a road manager for during an identity crisis.
Don Prego
A famous boss known throughout Italy as one of the powerful mafia bosses ever. He has ordered Benito to follow Ken but kill him if he grows too powerful.
Han
The corrupt District attorney whom Yumin is working with. He is attracted to Yumi and does not know her secret.
Kim Yang-bae
A Casino dealer and ex-pit fighter who fought Ken during the casino arc. He was once a homeless boy who was taken care of Tae Soo's father. He later became a member of the Sun-Ken Rock Group after losing to Ken.
Ryu Yoshizawa
Yumin's father and boss of the White Dragon Clan, the one who killed Ken's parents. He sent his own daughter, Yumin, to South Korea to act as a vanguard for the family yakuza. When Yumin fled, he sends Rei to track her down. To gain control of South Korea, he hires the assassin's guild to defeat the "strongest gang in Korea", not knowing that it is the Ken Rock Gang.
Muftal Batil
Members of the Kim Ban-Phuong's gang. He is originally from Kazakhstan but came to Korea to chase after his sister, who married a Korean. He tracks her down to a brothel where he then kills everyone, including his sister's husband. His sister commits suicide, causing him to go into depression. He meets BanPhuong and greatly respects him.
Kim Gae-ha
Owner of KG Entertainment who used aspiring singers as sex slaves. He hates Ken for the fact that Ken can possibly ruin his future at the agency and sought the help of the Ken Rock Gang to help in getting rid of him, not knowing Ken is the leader. Once he starts distributing the girls to powerful politicians for his greed, Ken defeats him.
Director Yan Tae-shin
He works with KG Entertainment under Gae-Ha. Both him and Gae-Ha sexually abused young girls who sought celebrity and stardom. When the pop idol group became expendable, Tae-Shin is overcome with guilt since he has built a bond with them overtime. He is forced by Ken to stay with the company to atone for his sins against young women.
Jang Ah-jung
A member of a girl group, daughter of politician Jang Yunchang. Her father specifically request to lay with her during the KG Entitlement merge.
Minhiro
A member of a girl group with short hair and big breasts. She and Na Yun-jeong become close through a photoshoot.
Na Yun-jeong
A member of a girl group. She lived as a homeless person in the United States, and then was found by the agency. She apparently is bisexual and masochistic.
Jang Yunchang
A corrupt politician who lusted after his illegitimate daughter Ah-Jung. He is kept alive by Tae-Soo so that he can be manipulated and blackmailed for the sex scandal against his own daughter.
Ju-Mon
Chef lieutenant who worked under Man-Gu. Despite hating Man-Gu, Ju-Mon respects him for his professionalism. He later defects to Ken.
Hui-Rin
The first lieutenant, recruited by Man-Gu, that Ken fought against. He is a veteran who was extremely skilled. He later defects to serve Ken instead.
Cherry twins
Twin sisters who are both lieutenants under Man-Gu. After fighting Ken, they defect to him.
Moon Ji-Ae
Sun's manager who does not hold Ken in high regards, often calling him poor.
Oh Man-Won
Sun's manager-in-chief in KG Entitlement. He and Ken work to make sure that Sun is generally provided for during road trips to her live performances.
Lee Man-gu
Imperial Casino Director who previously worked under TaeSoo's father and later betrays him to gain control of the casino. Initially, he employed the Ken Rock Gang against DalSoo, of the Fine Corporation, but refused to pay them afterwards. Despite recruiting five lieutenants to fight against Ken, he is defeated and is forced to hand over the paperwork of the casino. He is killed by BanPhuong while Kae-Lyn attempted to kill him.
Nami
A 16-year-old runaway who met Benito Armani and was saved by him from a gang.
Goshi-Wan
A Korean man who became Ken's roommate and friend.

== Publication ==
Written and illustrated by Boichi, Sun-Ken Rock was serialized in Shōnen Gahosha's seinen manga magazine Young King from April 24, 2006, (Note: It debuted in the magazine's 10th issue of 2006, released on April 24 of that same year.) to February 22, 2016. Shōnen Gahosha collected its chapters in 25 tankōbon volumes, released from September 27, 2006, to April 25, 2016.

The manga was first published digitally in English JManga on July 26, 2012; the site ended its service on May 30, 2013. The series was licensed by Crunchyroll for a simultaneous release, as the chapters were published in Japan, in February 2014. BookWalker added the series to its digital service in November 2015. Manga Planet added the series to its digital service on May 21, 2020. In October 2025, Kodama Tales announced that it had licensed the manga for an English-language print release in North America, with the first volume set to be released in 2026.

A spin-off, titled Yumin ni Gohan o Tabesasetai (ユミンにご飯を食べさせたい; 'I Want to Feed Yumin'), was released in one volume on November 26, 2012.
