= Turret gun =

19th century multi-shot handheld firearm

A turret gun is a type of multi-shot hand-held firearm. It is a variation on the percussion revolver, designed with chambers in a drum mounted so it would rotate horizontally (around a vertically mounted pivot), rather than around a horizontal axis, in an attempt to circumvent the patent of Samuel Colt. Chambers opened in all directions, and the weapon was prone to row ignition, all chambers firing in sequence, resulting in fatal accidents because one chamber always faces the shooter.

Several designs were attempted, including an 1837 Cochran and an 1851 Porter.

A number of turret rifles were also attempted. None of these weapons were successful, due to the row-firing hazard. As a result, they are very rare and much sought after.

== Sources ==
- Jeff Kinard, Pistols, 2004, ISBN 1-85109-470-9 (page 64) (Google Books)
