= Boichi =

South Korean mangaka (born 1973)

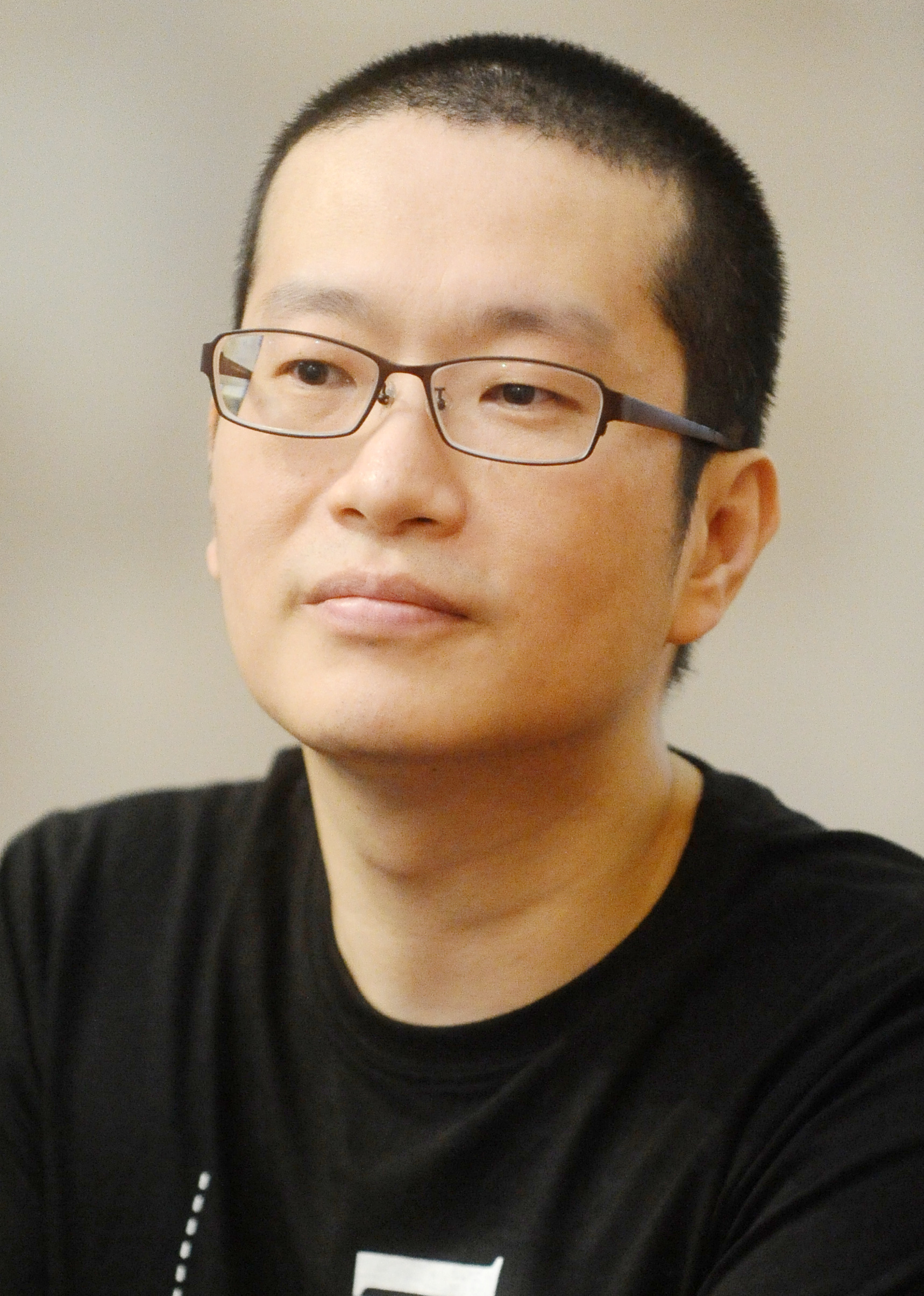
- Boichi at Lucca Comics & Games 2014
- Born: Mu-jik Park; January 29, 1973 (age 53); Seoul, South Korea
- Other name: Boichi
- Occupation: Manga artist
- Known for: Sun-Ken Rock; Dr. Stone
- Awards: Gran Guinigi 2011 - Best Short Story; 2019 Shogakukan Manga Award - Shōnen Category; 2019 Japan Media Arts Festival Awards - Grand Prize

Mu-jik Park (Korean: 박무직; RR: Bak Mujik; born January 29, 1973), known professionally as Boichi, is a South Korean manhwa-turned-manga artist living in Japan.

== Biography ==
Intending to be a manga artist from his childhood days, Boichi majored in physics in college as preparation to draw science fiction works, and also to learn the technology of performance and imaging. He went on to graduate school to major in image technology. In 1993, while still enrolled, Boichi debuted in a Korean girls manhwa magazine. Since then, he gained popularity releasing a number of works and publishing books on how to draw manga targeting a wide range of readers.

=== Manga career ===
In 2004 he transitioned into the world of Japanese manga. His "Ultimate Space Emperor Caesar", serialized in Monthly Comic Gum, was his first tankōbon in Japan. In 2005, 9 out of 11 of Boichi's hentai one-shot serialized in the Comic Aun were reunited under the volume titled Lovers in Winter. In 2006, he released two science fiction one-shot, "Hotel" and "Present" which, in 2008, were compiled in a volume titled Hotel along the other one-shots "It was all for the tuna", "Stephanos" and "Diadem".

In 2006, Boichi's first serialized manga, Sun-Ken Rock, was published in the bi-weekly magazine Young King. The manga spawned a side-story based on the character Yumin in 2011 and another based on Pickaxe in 2012. Another spin-off based on Yumin was released in 2012, entitled I want to feed Yumin and serialized in Monthly Young King. I want to feed Yumin is about the main character of Sun-Ken Rock, treating Yumin to traditional Korean food.

Boichi also worked as the artist of a five-volume manga titled Raqiya, written by Masao Yajima and published in 2009. He also served as the artist of the Brutality one-shot by Takeda Yuusuke in 2007.

In later 2011, he started the serialization of another manga titled "H.E the hunt for energy" in a new monthly magazine: Jump X. In this year, he won the Gran Guinigi prize for "It was all for the Tuna", about a scientist doing anything to revive the extinct tuna, experimenting on everything tuna-related and sacrificing his own happiness.

To express his sentiment towards the Vietnam War and apologize for Korea's actions during the war, Sun-Ken Rock volume 2′s royalties were donated to the Humanitarian Services for Children of Vietnam (HSCV). He asked Korean manga artists to contribute towards drawing a support page for the 2011 Tōhoku earthquake and tsunami, giving the royalties from the proceeding to the Red Cross. He also donated the money he planned to use to buy a new car towards helping tsunami victims.

In 2019, Boichi received two awards for Dr. Stone for the Shōnen category, respectively, Origin for the Best Manga category.

Since 2020, Boichi has been doing the artwork for manga adaptation of One Piece novel A titled One Piece episode A.

== Japanese works ==
- Lovers In Winter
- Hanzai wa Dame desu
- Personal lesson full of love
- Brutality (artwork)
- Raqiya (artwork)
- Hotel
- Present
- It was all for the tuna
- Stephanos
- Diadem
- Space Chef Caisar
- Sun-Ken Rock (サンケンロック)
- Sun-Ken Rock Gaiden – Yumin
- Sun-Ken Rock Gaiden – Pickaxe
- I want to feed Yumin
- Eques (script only)
- H · E The Hunt for Energy
- Trigun: The Lost Plant (appears in the anthology Trigun: Multiple Bullets)
- Wallman
- Kuntwagon
- The Space Between
- Anti-magma
- Terra Formars Gaiden: Asimov
- Origin
- Dr. Stone (artwork)
- One Piece episode A (artwork)
- He was there
- The Marshal King

== Korean works ==
- T.R.Y (Take off Rush Youth)
- Feeling
- TOON
- The constitution of Korea first amendment
- Param in the sky and the stars
- Black & White
- Metatron Diablo
- Hocus matsogeum
- Do not believe the movie
- Hotel: since A.D. 2079
- Super String: Marco Polo's Travel to Multiverse (later serialized in manga format in Weekly Shōnen Sunday)

== Awards ==
- Gran Guinigi 2011 – Best Short Story for It was all for the tuna, in Hotel (Panini Comics)
- Shogakukan Manga Awards 2019 – Shōnen Category for Dr. Stone (Shueisha)
- Japan Media Arts Festival 2019 – Manga Grand Prize for Origin (Kodansha)
