= List of Dr. Stone chapters =

Dr. Stone is a Japanese manga series written by Riichiro Inagaki and illustrated by Boichi. It was serialized in Weekly Shōnen Jump from March 6, 2017, to March 7, 2022. The individual chapters were collected and published by Shueisha in 26 tankōbon volumes as of July 2022. A 27th tankōbon volume was released on April 4, 2024. Viz Media licensed the manga in North America and the first volume was published in September 2018.

== Volumes ==
No.	Title	Original release date	English release date
1	Stone World	July 7, 2017; 978-4-08-881184-0	September 4, 2018; 978-1-9747-0261-9
1. "Stone World"; 2. "Fantasy vs. Science"; 3. "King of the Stone World"; 4. "Pure White Seashells" (純白の貝殻, Junpaku no Kaigara); 5. "Yuzuriha" (杠); 6. "Taiju vs. Tsukasa" (大樹VS(バーサス)司, Taiju Bāsasu Tsukasa); 7. "The Gunpowder Adventure" (火薬の冒険, Kayaku no Bōken)
Teen genius Senku Ishigami manages to revive his friend Taiju Oki, the two having been mysteriously petrified along with all of humanity for over 3,700 years with most traces of human civilization gone. As the only two humans freed from stone, Senku seeks to rebuild civilization in this "stone world" using his knowledge of science and Taiju's brawn to help him develop a nital solution out of a "miracle water" made from bat guano that could possibly free people from their petrified state. After a year-long process, the two friends intended to test the formula on their classmate Yuzuriha Ogawa, but a lion attack forces them to revive the strongest fighter in their school, Tsukasa Shishio. Tsukasa proved to be a valuable asset until Senku learns of his conflicting intent to create a world free of the old generation's corruption. Once they revive Yuzuriha after tricking Tsukasa, Senku takes his group to a volcanic hot spring in Hakone to create gunpowder. But Tsukasa realizes Senku's plan to reinvent firearms and pursues the group.
2	Two Kingdoms of the Stone World; Ishi no Sekai no Futatsu no Kuni (石の世界の二つの国)	September 4, 2017; 978-4-08-881259-5	November 6, 2018; 978-1-9747-0262-6
8. "Raise the Smoke Signal" (狼煙をあげろ, Noroshi o Agero); 9. "Senku vs. Tsukasa" (千空VS(バーサス)司, Senkū Bāsasu Tsukasa); 10. "Student of Science" (科学の徒, Kagaku no To); 11. "Weapon of Science" (科学の武器, Kagaku no Buki); 12. "Epilogue of Prologue (End of Part 0)" (Epilogue of Prologue (序章最終話), Epirōgu obu Purorōgu (Joshō Saishū-wa)); 13. "Part 1: Stone World The Beginning" (第一章 STONE WORLD THE BEGINNING, Dai Isshō: Sutōn Wārudo Za Biginingu); 14. "Those Who Have Faith" (信ずるもの, Shinzuru Mono); 15. "Two Kingdoms of the Stone World" (石の世界の二つの国, Ishi no Sekai no Futatsu no Kuni); 16. "Kohaku" (コハク)
After Senku creates a batch of gunpowder, an accident caused by Taiju reveals there are other humans in the Stone World. Senku's decision to light more gunpowder attracts Tsukasa, who takes Yuzuriha hostage to demand the recipe for the revival fluid. Senku relinquishes the recipe to save Yuzuriha and allows Tsukasa to snap his neck after refusing to abandon science. However, having used gestures to lay clues to Taiju prior, Senku is revived when the revival fluid is placed on the stone fragment on his neck. Senku then gives Taiju and Yuzuriha instructions to join Tsukasa, allowing him to believe Senku is dead, as spies while he searches for the smoke signal's source and acquire allies. Senku eventually meets Kohaku, who attacked Tsukasa before he trapped her under a tree. Senku manages to use his science know-how to create a block and tackle to lift the tree off of Kohaku who takes him to her village.
3	Two Million Years of Being; Nihyakuman-nen no Arika (200万年の在処)	December 4, 2017; 978-4-08-881288-5	January 1, 2019; 978-1-9747-0263-3
17. "Nasty Looks" (ワッッルい顔, Warrrui Kao); 18. "Sorcery Showdown" (妖術決戦, Yōjutsu Kessen); Side Story: "Chrome vs. Senku! Arithme-Battle!!" (クロムVS(バーサス)千空 算術決戦!!, Kuromu Bāsasu Senkū: Sanjutsu Kessen!!); 19. "Two Million Years of Being" (200万年の在処, Nihyakuman-nen no Arika); 20. "Stone Road"; 21. "Dawn of Iron" (鉄の夜明け, Tetsu no Yoake); 22. "Survival Gourmet"; 23. "The Smooth Talker" (ペラッペラな男, Perappera na Otoko); 24. "Lightning Speed!!!" (電光石火!!!, Denkō Sekka!!!); 25. "By These Hands, the Light of Science" (この手に科学の灯を, Kono Te ni Kagaku no Hi o)
Kohaku takes Senku to the outskirts of her village, where he meets guards Kinro and Ginro along with a "sorcerer" named Chrome who Senku takes as his assistant after recognizing his "magic" as primitive science. Learning that Chrome became a sorcerer to help Kohaku's sickly sister, Ruri, Senku reveals to him about the world that existed 3,700 years ago and decides to help him and Kohaku develop an antibiotic to save Ruri. The trio are aided by the guards and a girl named Suika in a multi-part series to develop the means to make antibiotics with by-products, including the reinvention of electricity. At that time, the gang are approached by Gen Asagiri, a stage magician who Tsukasa revived to make sure Senku died but has his own agenda.
4	Senku's Lab	February 2, 2018; 978-4-08-881341-7	March 5, 2019; 978-1-9747-0446-0
26. "A Shallow Alliance" (薄っぺらの同盟, Usuppera no Dōmei); 27. "A Certain Scientist's Wish" (とある科学者の願い, Toaru Kagaku-sha no Negai); 28. "Clear World"; 29. "Senku's Lab"; 30. "Death Green"; 31. "Friends Have Each Other's Backs" (背中合わせの仲間たち, Senaka Awase no Nakama-tachi); 32. "Brains & Heart" (BRAIN & HEART); 33. "Baaad Chemicals" (ヤベー薬, Yabē Kusuri); 34. "Sneaky Grand Bout Strategy" (謀略の御前試合, Bōryaku no Gozen-Jiai)
Following a sudden attempt on Gen's life by the villager Magma, Kohaku reveals an upcoming Grand Bout where the winner becomes the new chief and marries Ruri. As Kohaku, Kinro, and Ginro train for the Grand Bout to prevent Magma from disposing of Ruri, Gen gives a false report to Tsukasa after Senku promised a bottle of cola. Senku develops glass, using some to create corrective lenses for the short-sighted Suika, while Chrome enlists the village's skilled craftsman Kaseki to develop lab equipment. Senku breaks in his lab by making Ginro a silver spear while enlisting him to safely acquire the sulfuric acid needed for the antibiotic. Despite Ginro's fear of dying, he overcomes it in time to help Senku and Chrome.
5	Tale for the Ages; Ikusen-nen Monogatari (幾千年物語)	April 4, 2018; 978-4-08-881381-3	May 7, 2019; 978-1-9747-0501-6
35. "The Masked Warrior" (仮面の戦士, Kamen no Senshi); 36. "Kinro and Ginro" (金狼(キンロー)と銀狼(ギンロー), Kinrō to Ginrō); 37. "Science-User Chrome" (科学使いクロム, Kagaku Tsukai Kuromu); 38. "Master of Flame"; 39. "And the Winner Is..."; 40. "Two Million Years in the Making" (200万年の結晶, Nihyakuman-nen no Kesshō); 41. "Doctor Stone"; 42. "Tale for the Ages" (幾千年物語, Ikusen-nen Monogatari); 43. "Humanity's Final Six" (人類 最後の6人, Jinrui Saigo no Roku-nin)
Senku only needs alcohol to complete the antibiotic as he and Chrome join the others in the Grand Bout, which commences with Magma's lackey Mantle forcing Kohaku to get herself disqualified after abducting Suika. Suika returns during Kinro's match with Magma, giving him her mask to remove his near-sightness, only for Magma to take him out with a cheat shot. But Chrome manages to defeat Magma with Gen's help, using his own tears with Suika's glasses to create a magnifying lens to set Magma's clothes on fire. After Ginro's humiliating defeat when he deviates from their plan, Senku wins the tournament when Chrome passes out before the final match. Senku quickly divorces Ruri once obtaining the alcohol and completes the sulfa drug, with Ruri making a full recovery. Senku is then accepted as new village chief, with Ruri revealing the village's name to be named Ishigami Village and that she learned of Senku through one of the many oral stories her bloodline kept alive. Ruri proceeds to tell the hundredth tale: The story of Senku's father, Byakuya, who became an astronaut and traveled to the International Space Station, alongside cosmonaut Shamil Volkov and American songstress Lillian Weinburg, joining fellow crew members Connie, Dalia, and Yakov. During their stay, Byakuya and the crew witness the petrification phenomenon.
6	Stone Wars	July 4, 2018; 978-4-08-881558-9	July 2, 2019; 978-1-9747-0506-1
44. "One Hundred Nights, One Thousand Skies" (百の夜と千の空, Hyaku no Yoru to Sen no Sora); 45. "Epilogue of Chapter 1 (End of Part 1)" (Epilogue of Chapter 1 (第一章最終話), Epirōgu obu Chaputā Ichi (Dai Isshō Saishū-wa)); 46. "Stone Wars"; 47. "Science vs. Power"; 48. "Blades of Science" (科学の刃, Kagaku no Yaiba); 49. "To the Present" (そして現代へ, Soshite Gendai e); 50. "Humanity's Greatest Weapon" (人類最強の武器, Jinrui Saikyō no Buki); 51. "Sweets for the Stone World" (石の世界にスイーツを, Ishi no Sekai ni Suītsu wo); 52. "Age of Energy" (動力の時代, Dōryoku no Jidai)
Ruri continues telling Senku how Byakuya, after deducing that the phenomenon originated in South America, returned to Earth with his crewmates as they started the families which the Ishigami Villagers descended from. In time, after Dalia and Yakov departed in an attempt to find a cure for Connie, the rest of the crew gradually die from pneumonia as Byakuya wrote down the "Hundred Tales" to preserve his knowledge for future generations in hopes that Senku would one day use them. After visiting Byakuya's grave marker, Senku learns from Gen that a group of Tsukasa's men under his right hand man Hyoga plan to attack the village. Despite Senku's gambit to hold Hyoga's forces off long enough to product katanas while Gen sides with them, Hyoga reveals his attack as a distraction for his ally Homura to set the village on fire and force everyone into the open. Suika manages to lure Hyoga's group away, stranding Hyoga and Homura on the treetops to avoid the poison gas from the acid pool. As Hyoga informs Tsukasa of Gen's betrayal and Senku's survival, Senku sets his sights on reinventing the cellular phone by spring time. This involves many steps, including creating a cotton candy machine.
7	Voices from Here to Eternity; Koe wa Mugen no Kanata e (声は無限の彼方へ)	September 4, 2018; 978-4-08-881610-4	September 3, 2019; 978-1-9747-0778-2
53. "Hard Knocks Crafting Club" (スパルタ工作クラブ, Suparuta Kōsaku Kurabu); 54. "Flickering Blue Jewel" (瞬きのブルージュエル, Matataki no Burū Jueru); 55. "Treasure Dungeon"; 56. "The Treasure"; 57. "Heat Heart"; 58. "Wave of Science" (科学の波, Kagaku no Nami); 59. "Voices from Here to Eternity" (声は無限の彼方へ, Koe wa Mugen no Kanata e); 60. "Angel's Song, Devil's Whisper" (天女の歌と悪魔の囁き, Ten'nyo no Uta to Akuma no Sasayaki); 61. "Stone Wars Begin" (STONE WARS BEGINNING)
Using the water wheel Chrome built, Senku mechanizes the ironmaking process so the villagers can prepare for winter while his group begin developing light bulbs to celebrate Christmas with. Following a spelunking expedition for tungsten, Gen having led the villagers to build an observatory as a birthday present, Senku leads his group in creating the components needed to make two functional cell phones. After testing the phones, Senku is inspired by Ruri to find a time capsule sealed in Byakuya's gravestone: a glass record that Byakuya made to communicate with Senku. Using a phonograph, Senku and the villagers are able to hear a recording of the astronauts with Lillian's song inspiring the villagers to recreate the entertainment of the modern world. With the village's support and the cell phone, Senku declares a stone war against Tsukasa.
8	Hotline; Hot Line	December 4, 2018; 978-4-08-881667-8	November 5, 2019; 978-1-9747-0952-6
62. "Double Chase"; 63. "Information Warfare" (情報戦争, Jōhō Sensō); 64. "Hot Line"; 65. "Call from the Dead" (死者からの電話, Shisha Kara no Denwa); 66. "Liars and Truth Tellers" (ウソつきと正直者, Usotsuki to Shōjiki-mono); 67. "Full Mobilization" (全軍出撃, Sengun Shutsugeki); 68. "Flames of Revolution" (革命の火, Kakumei no Hi); 69. "Steam Gorilla"; 70. "Paper Shield"
After tasking Chrome, Magma and Gen with delivering the cell phone to Tsukasa's territory, they get chased by Homura, who had been watching the village from a distance since the first attack from Tsukasa's forces. Anticipating this, Senku develops a steam-powered automobile to give chase while carrying the villagers in force, along with his chemicals, into enemy territory. With Homura captured, the delivery team manages to bury the cell phone by a fake grave marker so it will be found by Taiju and Yuzuriha, who receive the first long-distance call from Senku. From there, he relays his plan to win over Tsukasa's men using Lillian's song and having Gen impersonating her, leading them into thinking the United States are rebuilding and will send help. While their ruse is quickly discovered by Nikki, a female follower of Tsukasa who happens to be a hardcore fan of Lillian, she agrees to help upon listening to her song. Chrome winds up captured by Ukyo, a sharp-shooting archer in Tsukasa's employ, while Senku and the villagers are working on improving the automobile, so Senku reinforces it with impromptu carbon fiber plating in order to both break Chrome out and intimidate Tsukasa's men.
9	Final Battle	February 4, 2019; 978-4-08-881726-2	January 7, 2020; 978-1-9747-1074-4
71. "Prison Break"; 72. Experience Points" (経験値, Keiken-chi); 73. "Top-Secret Mission" (極秘のミッション, Gokuhi no Misshon); 74. "Fateful 20 Seconds" (運命の20秒, Unmei no Nijū-byō); 75. "20-Second Countdown" (COUNT DOWN 20, Kaunto Daun Nijū); 76. "Final Battle"; 77. "The Power of Science" (科学の力, Kagaku no Chikara); 78. "That Which Destroys or Saves" (壊すもの救うもの, Kowasu mono Sukū mono); 79. "For This Very Moment" (ずっとこの瞬間を, Zutto kono Toki o)
After being taunted by Yo, the warden of his prison who used to be a crooked police officer, Chrome devises a way to escape from his prison cell by attempting to synthesize impromptu sodium hydroxide to fray the ropes holding the bamboo bars together; while he only manages to produce a solution similar to bleach, it still works and he makes his way out, fooling Yo into thinking he has a fatal disease, and he rejoins the Kingdom of Science's troops. With Chrome released, and Ukyo deciding to side with the Kingdom of Science when Senku ensures his desire of winning the war without casualties, Senku decides to repurpose the tank for a frontal assault on the Cave of Miracles, providing a distraction that allows Tsukasa's men to surrender while Senku, Chrome and Gen make their way in to synthesize gunpowder from the nitric acid. Tsukasa and Hyoga step in, destroying the materials needed for gunpowder, but Senku manages to synthesize nitroglycerin from the nitric acid, forcing Tsukasa into a stalemate. Senku manages to negotiate to bring Tsukasa's little sister, Mirai, back to life, in return for a ceasefire. Shortly after Mirai is successfully revived, however, Hyoga turns on Tsukasa, fatally stabbing him when he shields his sister from a sudden attack.
10	Wings of Humanity; Hito no Tsubasa (ヒトの翼)	April 4, 2019; 978-4-08-881801-6	March 3, 2020; 978-1-9747-1121-5
80. "Humanity's Strongest Tag Team" (人類最強のタッグ, Jinrui Saikyō no Taggu); 81. "Fingertip"; 82. "Epilogue of Stone Wars (End of Part 2)" (EPILOGUE OF STONE WARS (第二章最終話), Epirōgu obu Sutōn Wōzu (Dai Nishō Saishū-wa)); 83. "Dr. Stone"; 84. "People Equal Power" (人 = (は)力, Hito wa Chikara); 85. "Ultimate Resource" (資源の王様, Shigen no Ōsama); 86. "Money"; 87. "Senku's Department Store" (デパート千空, Depāto Senkū); 88. "Wings of Humanity" (ヒトの翼, Hito no Tsubasa)
Hyoga reveals that his true objective with joining Tsukasa was to cull humanity even further than what Tsukasa practiced, believing that not only the young, but also the more rational ones should be the only people allowed to live. Disagreeing with him, Senku teams up with Tsukasa, who realized the error of his ways, and they defeat Hyoga with Senku using an improvised taser. With the war ended and Hyoga and Homura imprisoned, Tsukasa's Empire is unified with the Kingdom of Science, and Senku resolves to build a ship in order to navigate to the origin point of the phenomenon that petrified the people of Earth, his idea being petrifying Tsukasa again so the rocky coating will heal his wound. Tsukasa is put in cryosleep in a "refrigerator" built by Senku while the Kingdom of Science sets about building the ship. Knowing a captain will be necessary to steer the ship across the ocean, Senku releases Ryusui Nanami, the wealthy heir of a shipping conglomerate who is also an expert sailor. Ryusui promptly informs that the ship will need a more powerful fuel to sail across the sea: petroleum. Sending Chrome, Kohaku and Ukyo to scout for oil wells, they find out that successive eruptions of Mount Fuji throughout the last 3,700 years caused the seaboard to change, leading Senku to devise a hot air balloon so the landmasses can be scouted from above.
11	First Contact; Fāsuto Kontakuto (ファーストコンタクト)	July 4, 2019; 978-4-08-881881-8	May 5, 2020; 978-1-9747-1479-7
89. "Adventurers" (冒険者たち, Bōkensha-tachi); 90. "New World Map"; 91. "Need Bread? Start with Wheat" (パンが無ければ麦から作ればいいじゃない, Pan ga Nakereba Mugi kara Tsukureba Ī Janai); 92. "Desire Is Noble" (欲しい = (イコール)正義, Hoshī Ikōru Seigi); 93. "The First Shot Is Yours" (一枚目はあなたに, Ichi-mai-me wa Anata ni); 94. "The Scent of Black Gold" (黒い宝石(ブラックジュエル)の香り, Burakku Jueru no Kaori); 95. "First Contact" (ファーストコンタクト, Fāsuto Kontakuto); 96. "Eye of Science" (科学の眼, Kagaku no Me); 97. "The Joy of Leadership" (楽しい帝王学, Tanoshī Teiō-gaku)
12	The Secret of Petrification; Sekka no Himitsu (石化の秘密)	September 4, 2019; 978-4-08-882055-2	July 7, 2020; 978-1-9747-1529-9
98. "Ryusui" (龍水); 99. "Kingdom of Science Photo Journal" (科学王国写真日記, Kagaku Ōkoku Shashin Nikki); 100. "Origin of the 100 Tales" (はじまりの百物語, Hajimari no Hyaku-Monogatari); 101. "Treasure Chest" (TREASURE BOX); 102. "Perseus, Ship of Science" (科学船ペルセウス, Kagakusen Peruseusu); 103. "Light of Hope and Despair" (絶望と希望の光, Zetsubō to Kibō no Hikari); 104. "Men of Forensics" (科捜研の男たち, Kasōken no Otoko-tachi); 105. "The Island's Greatest Beauty" (島一の美少女, Shima-ichi no Bishōjo); 106. "The Secret of Petrification" (石化の秘密, Sekika no Himitsu)
13	Science Wars	November 1, 2019; 978-4-08-882106-1	September 1, 2020; 978-1-9747-1728-6
107. "Ace in the Hole on the Ship of Science" (切り札は科学の船に, Kirifuda wa Kagaku no Fune ni); 108. "Double Ace in the Hole" (切り札二枚, Kirifuda Ni-mai); 109. "Great Escape" (大脱走, Dai Dassō); 110. "Beauty Science" (美しい科学, Utsukushī Kagaku); 111. "Science Wars"; 112. "King of Three Dimensions" (三次元の王者, Sanjigen no Ōja); 113. "Cryptography Science" (暗号通信の科学, Angō Tsūshin no Kagaku); 114. "Silently, Science Pierces the Stone" (そして科学は静かに石を穿つ, Soshite Kagaku wa Shizuka ni Ishi o Ugatsu); 115. "One Second, One Grain" (一秒と一粒, Ichi-byō to Hito-tsubu)
14	Medusa's True Face; Medyūsa no Sugao (石化光線(メデューサ)の素顔)	February 4, 2020; 978-4-08-882206-8	November 3, 2020; 978-1-9747-1729-3
116. "Miracle in Hand" (奇跡はこの掌で, Kiseki wa Kono Tenohira de); 117. "The Kingdom of Science Strikes Back" (反撃の科学王国, Hangeki no Kagaku Ōkoku); 118. "Silent Soldiers"; 119. "Science Soldiers"; 120. "Top Secret"; 121. "Medusa's True Face" (石化光線(メデューサ)の素顔, Medyūsa no Sugao); 122. "Brain-Battle Puzzle Pieces" (頭脳戦のパズルピース, Zunō-sen no Pazuru Pīsu); 123. "Brain-Battle Gambit" (頭脳戦のディールゲーム, Zunō-sen no Dīru Gēmu); 124. "Invention of Gods and Devils" (神と悪魔の発明品, Kami to Akuma no Hatsumei-hin)
15	The Strongest Weapon Is... Saikyō no Buki wa (最強の武器は)	April 3, 2020; 978-4-08-882255-6	February 2, 2021; 978-1-9747-2003-3
125. "Decisive Three-Dimensional Battle" (三次元の決戦, Sanjigen no Kessen); 126. "Three-Dimensional Stratagem" (三次元の謀略, Sanjigen no Bōryaku); 127. "Medusa & Perseus"; 128. "Island-Wide Battle Royale" (全土大乱戦, Zendo-Dai Ransen); 129. "Joker"; 130. "Devil's Choice" (悪魔の選択, Akuma no Sentaku); 131. "Nasty Crimes" (悪りー罪, Warī-zai); 132. "The Strongest Weapon Is..." (最強の武器は, Saikyō no Buki wa); 133. "Flash of Destruction" (滅びの煌めき, Horobi no Kirameki)
16	Medusa vs. Science	July 3, 2020; 978-4-08-882350-8	April 6, 2021; 978-1-9747-2006-4
134. "Commander Faceoff" (大将戦, Taishō-sen); 135. "Counting"; 136. "Medusa vs. Science"; 137. "Last Man Standing"; 138. "Epilogue of Chapter 3 (End of Part 3)" (Epilogue of Chapter 3 (第三章最終話), Epirōgu obu Chaputā San (Dai Sanshō Saishū-wa)); 139. "First Dream"; 140. "New World Pilots" (新世界飛行士, Shin Sekai Hikō-shi); 141. "First Team"; 142. "World Power"
17	Pioneers of Earth; Chikyū no Kaitaku-sha-tachi (地球の開拓者たち)	September 4, 2020; 978-4-08-882405-5	July 6, 2021; 978-1-9747-2280-8
143. "Ryusui vs. Senku"; 144. "Ryusui & Gen vs. Senku & Kohaku" (RYUSUI GEN VS. SENKU KOHAKU); 145. "Bar Francois"; 146. "Bar Francois: Bitters" (BAR FRANÇOIS ~BITTER SIDE~); 147. "Science Journey"; 148. "Pioneers of Earth" (地球の開拓者たち, Chikyū no Kaitaku-shatachi); 149. "Light Lure in Darkness" (暗闇の誘蛾灯, Kurayami no Yūgatō); 150. "Righteous Science-User" (正義の科学使い, Seigi no Kagaku Tsukai); 151. "Dr. X"
18	Science Is Elegant	November 4, 2020; 978-4-08-882473-4	September 7, 2021; 978-1-9747-2405-5
152. "Doctor vs. Doctor"; 153. "War Game"; 154. "Spy vs. Spy"; 155. "Science Is Elegant"; 156. "Two Scientists" (二人の科学者, Futari no Kagaku-sha); 157. "Same Time, Same Place" (同じ刻同じ場所で, Onaji Toki Onaji Basho de); 158. "Who's the Scientist?" (科学者は誰だ, Kagaku-sha wa Dare da); 159. "Lock On"; 160. "Torch of Science" (科学の灯, Kagaku no Akari)
19	Corn City: Population One Million; Hyakuman-nin no Kōnshiti (100万人のコーンシティ)	January 4, 2021; 978-4-08-882550-2	November 2, 2021; 978-1-9747-2515-1
161. "Craft Wars"; 162. "Down the Earth-Stained Path" (土まみれの道を, Tsuchi Mamire no Michi o); 163. "Multifront Final Battle" (全世界決戦, Zen Sekai Kessen); 164. "Re-Lock On"; 165. "Know the Rules, Make the Rules" (ルールを知る者創る者, Rūru o Shiru-mono; Tsukuru-mono); 166. "Ultimate Knight" (最強のナイト, Saikyō no Naito); 167. "Different Strokes" (好きなモンは, Sukina Mon wa); 168. "Corn City: Population One Million" (100万人のコーンシティ, Hyakuman-nin no Kōn-shitī); 169. "Risk or Heart"
20	Medusa Mechanism	April 2, 2021; 978-4-08-882598-4	February 1, 2022; 978-1-9747-2719-3
170. "Staring Up at the Same Moon" (同じ月を見て, Onaji Tsuki o Mite); 171. "Staring at the Same Light" (同じ光を見て, Onaji Hikari o Mite); 172. "Marked with an X of Wisdom" (叡知の道標, Eichi no Michishirube); 173. "Earth Race"; 174. "The Specter of the Panama Canal" (幻のパナマ運河, Maboroshi no Panama Unga); 175. "Ultra Race Across South America" (南米横断ウルトラレース, Nanbei Ōdan Uruto Rarēsu); 176. "Net-Breaking Battle Plan" (包囲網突破戦, Hōimō Toppa-sen); 177. "Medusa Mechanism"; 178. "Science Scales Mountains" (科学は山を超えて, Kagaku wa Yama o Koete)
21	Stone Sanctuary	June 4, 2021; 978-4-08-882687-5	May 3, 2022; 978-1-9747-2897-8
179. "Bounds on the High-Wire" (綱渡りの絆, Tsuna Watari no Kizuna); 180. "Sickening Yet Beautiful" (悍ましくも美しく, Ozomashiku mo Utsukushiku); 181. "New World Science"; 182. "Diamond Heart"; 183. "Stone Sanctuary"; 184. "Fort Medusa" (メデューサの砦, Mede'yūsa no Toride); 185. "Lovely Cleavage Plane" (美しき劈開面, Utsukushiki Hekikaimen); 186. "To Each Their Own Blade" (刃十人十色, Yaiba Jūnintoiro); 187. "Cyber Guerilla"
22	Our Stone World	August 4, 2021; 978-4-08-882735-3	July 5, 2022; 978-1-9747-3216-6
188. "What I Once Sought to Destroy" (かつて消そうとしたものは, Katsute Kesō to Shita Mono wa); 189. "Our Dr. Stone"; 190. "Science Transcends Life" (科学は生命を越えて, Kagaku wa Inochi o Koete); 191. "Divine Scream, Down to Earth" (世界に神の叫びを, Sekai ni Kami no Sakebi o); 192. "Until We Meet Again" (また逢う日まで, Mata Au Hi Made); 193. "Our Stone World"; 194. "Homo Sapiens, All Alone" (ひとりぼっちのホモサピエンス, Hitoribocchi no Homosapiensu); 195. "Treasure Hunter, All Alone" (ひとりぼっちのトレジャーハンター, Hitoribocchi no Torejā Hantā); 196. "Scientist, All Alone" (ひとりぼっちのサイエンティスト, Hitoribocchi no Saientisuto)
23	Future Engine	November 4, 2021; 978-4-08-882820-6	October 4, 2022; 978-1-9747-3395-8
197. "A Stony Eden and Its Forbidden Fruit" (石だらけのエデンと禁断の果実, Ishi-darake no Eden to Kindan no Kashitsu); 198. "Whole New World"; 199. "Superalloys" (超合金, Chōgōkin); 200. "Future Engine"; 201. "Morse Talk"; 203. "Ryusui Corp." (龍水財閥, Ryūsui Zaibatsu); 204. "Missile Heart"; 205. "The Universe Is Written in the Language of Mathematics" (宇宙は数学という言語で書かれている, Uchū wa Sūgaku to iu Gengo de Kakarete iru); 206. "Universe of Zeroes and Ones" (宇宙を作る0と1, Uchū o Tsukuru Zero to Ichi)
24	Stone to Space	January 4, 2022; 978-4-08-882877-0	January 3, 2023; 978-1-9747-3437-5
206. "Dawn of the Computer" (コンピュータの夜明け, Konpyūta no Yoake); 207. "Linking the Circuit Board" (繋がる回路図, Tsunagaru Kairozu); 208. "Science Transcends Humanity" (科学は人知を超える, Kagaku wa Jinchi o Koeru); 209. "The Rocket's Hard Truth" (ロケットの真相, Roketto no Shinsō); 210. "Not One-Way"; 211. "World Tour for Resources" (世界一周素材旅行, Sekai Isshū Sozai Ryokō); 212. "Final Part: Stone to Space" (終決章 STONE TO SPACE, Shūketsu Shō: Sutōn tu Supēsu); 213. "Unknown Known"; 214. "Stone World's Earth Defense Force" (石世界地球防衛軍, Ishi Sekai Chikyū Bōei-gun)
25	Zero; 0	March 4, 2022; 978-4-08-883032-2	April 4, 2023; 978-1-9747-3631-7
215. "Long, Long Road"; 216. "Hello, World"; 217. "Science Underdogs" (科学の挑戦者, Kagaku no Chōsen-sha); 218. "WWW (World Wide Workshop)" (W(ワールド)W(ワイド)W(ワークショップ), Wārudo Waido Wākushoppu); 219. "Three Heroes" (三勇士, San Yūshi); 220. "A Desire for All" (全てが欲しくて, Subete ga Hoshikute); 221. "Entrusting It All" (全てを託して, Subete o Takushite); 222. "Science Road"; 223. "0"
26	A Future to Get Excited About; Mirai o Sosoru Mono (未来を唆るもの)	July 4, 2022; 978-4-08-883032-2	July 4, 2023; 978-1-9747-3867-0
224. "In Space" (IN THE SPACE); 225. "Docking"; 226. "Giant Step"; 227. "It Was You" (YOU ARE); 228. "Life Stone"; 229. "Why-Man"; 230. "Human"; 231. "A Future to Get Excited About" (未来を唆るもの, Mirai o Sosoru Mono); 232. "Final Chapter: Dr. Stone" (最終話 Dr.STONE, Saishū wa Dokutā Sutōn)
27	Future Science	April 4, 2024; 978-4-08-884037-6	June 3, 2025; 978-1-9747-5576-9
One-shot: "Terraforming"; Bonus: 4D Science; 1D. "Future Message"; 2D. "Future Road Map"; 3D. "Future Science"
