= Industrial porcelain enamel =

Type of metal surface coating

Industrial porcelain enamel (also known as glass lining, glass-lined steel, or glass fused to steel) is the use of vitreous enamel for industrial, rather than artistic, applications. Porcelain enamel, a thin layer glass applied to a substrate of metal, is used to protect surfaces from chemical attack and physical damage, modify the structural characteristics of the substrate, and improve the appearance of the product.

Enamel has been used for art and decoration since the period of Ancient Egypt, and for industry since the Industrial Revolution. It is most commonly used in the production of cookware, home appliances, bathroom fixtures, water heaters, and scientific laboratory equipment.

== Characteristics ==
The most essential characteristic of porcelain enamel, from an industrial perspective, is its resistance to corrosion. Mild steel is used in almost every industry and a vast array of products; enamel is an economical way of protecting this, and other chemically vulnerable materials, from corrosion. It can also produce extraordinarily smooth, glossy finishes in a wide array of colours; these colours will not fade when exposed to UV light, unlike paint. Enamel is highly heat-resistant; this allows it to be used in high-temperature applications where an organic anti-corrosion coating or galvanization may be impractical or even dangerous (see Metal fume fever).

Porcelain enamel also sees less frequent employment of some of its other properties; examples are its abrasion resistance, where it may perform better than many metals; its resistance to organic solvents, where it is entirely impervious; its resistance to thermal shock, where it can resist rapid cooling from temperatures 500°C and higher; and its longevity.

== Terminology ==
The term porcelain enamel can be a source of linguistic confusion. Primarily used in the United States, the term is misleading because the material is not porcelain, indeed not any type of ceramic. It refers instead to vitreous enamel, which is a structurally distinct class of material.

Outside the United States, the material is termed vitreous enamel, derived from the Latin word for glass. Production involves melting glass-forming minerals to create a granular substance known as frit. This frit is applied to a metal surface and fired in a furnace, causing the glass to melt and chemically bond with the metal.

Porcelain is a solid, clay-based ceramic produced by firing refined clay, quartz and feldspar at high temperatures. Conversely, vitreous enamel consists of a thin glass coating fused to a metallic substrate, such as cast iron, steel or aluminium.

From a materials science perspective, classifying such a coating as a ceramic is technically inaccurate. Whilst glass and ceramics are related, ceramics possess crystalline structures, whereas glass is an amorphous solid. Because the enamel coating is a glass, it lacks the crystalline arrangement of porcelain.

== Applications ==
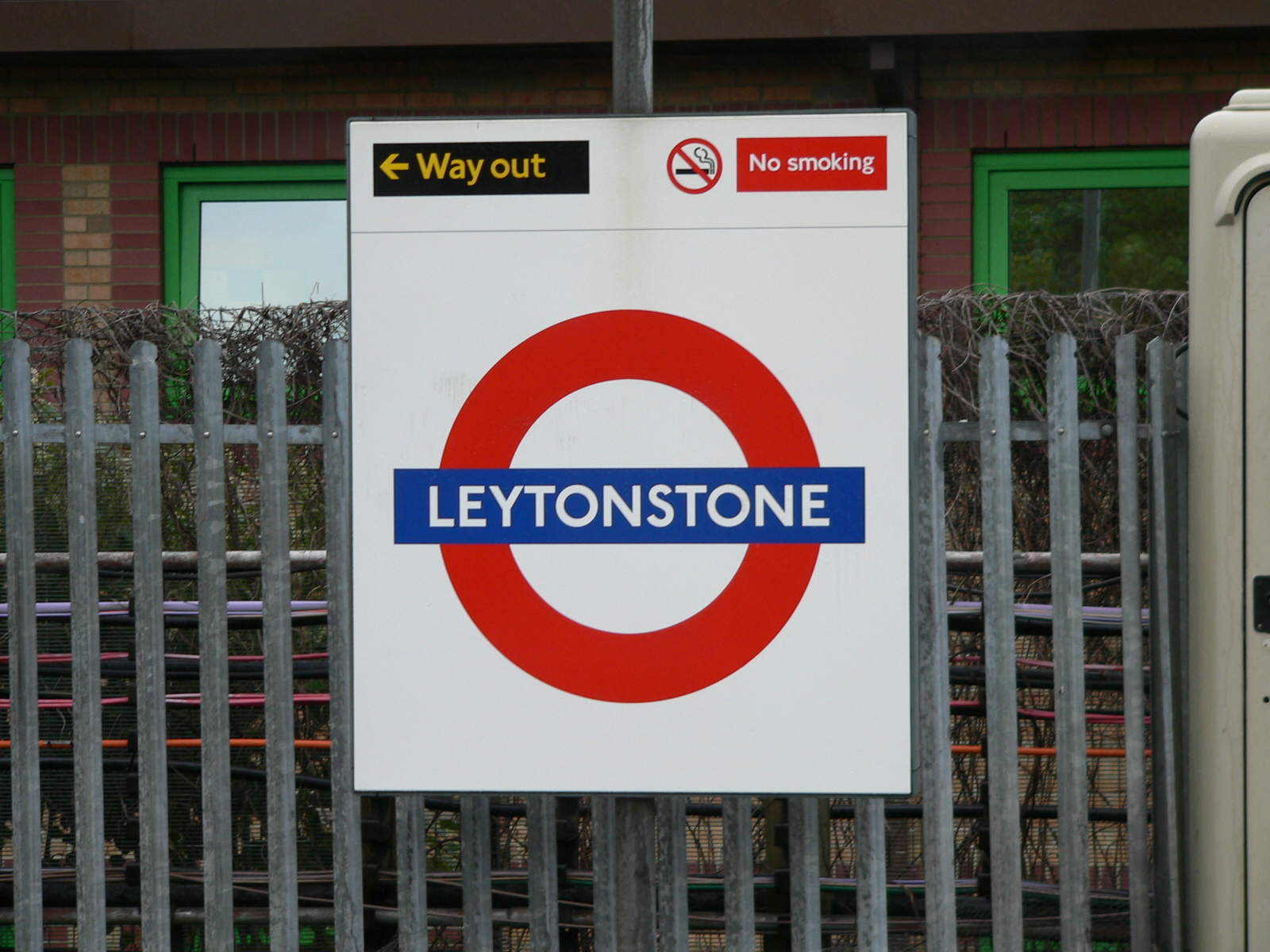
A porcelain-enamelled London Underground sign at Leytonstone tube station

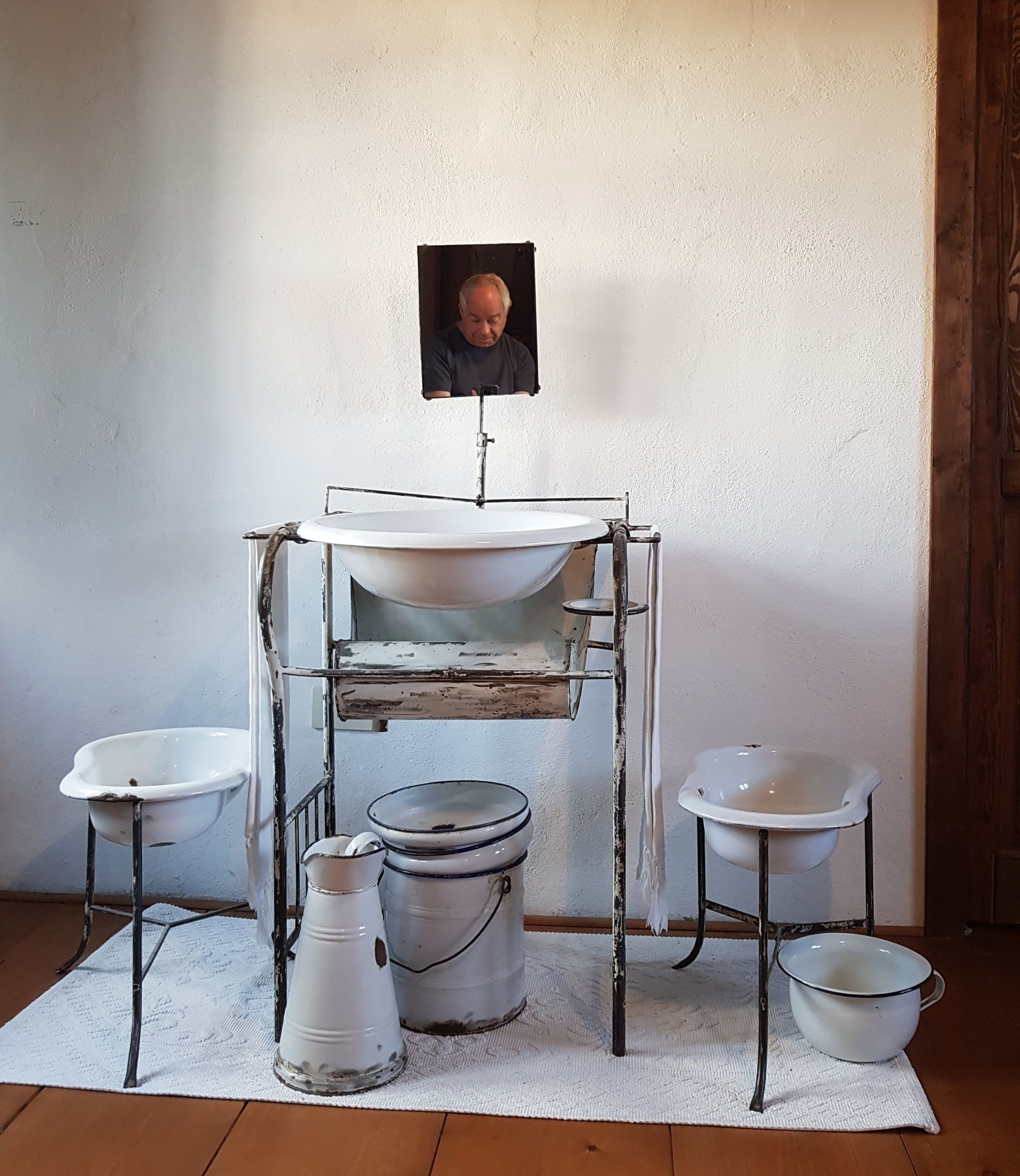
Assortment of old enamel bathroom appliances in Sardinia

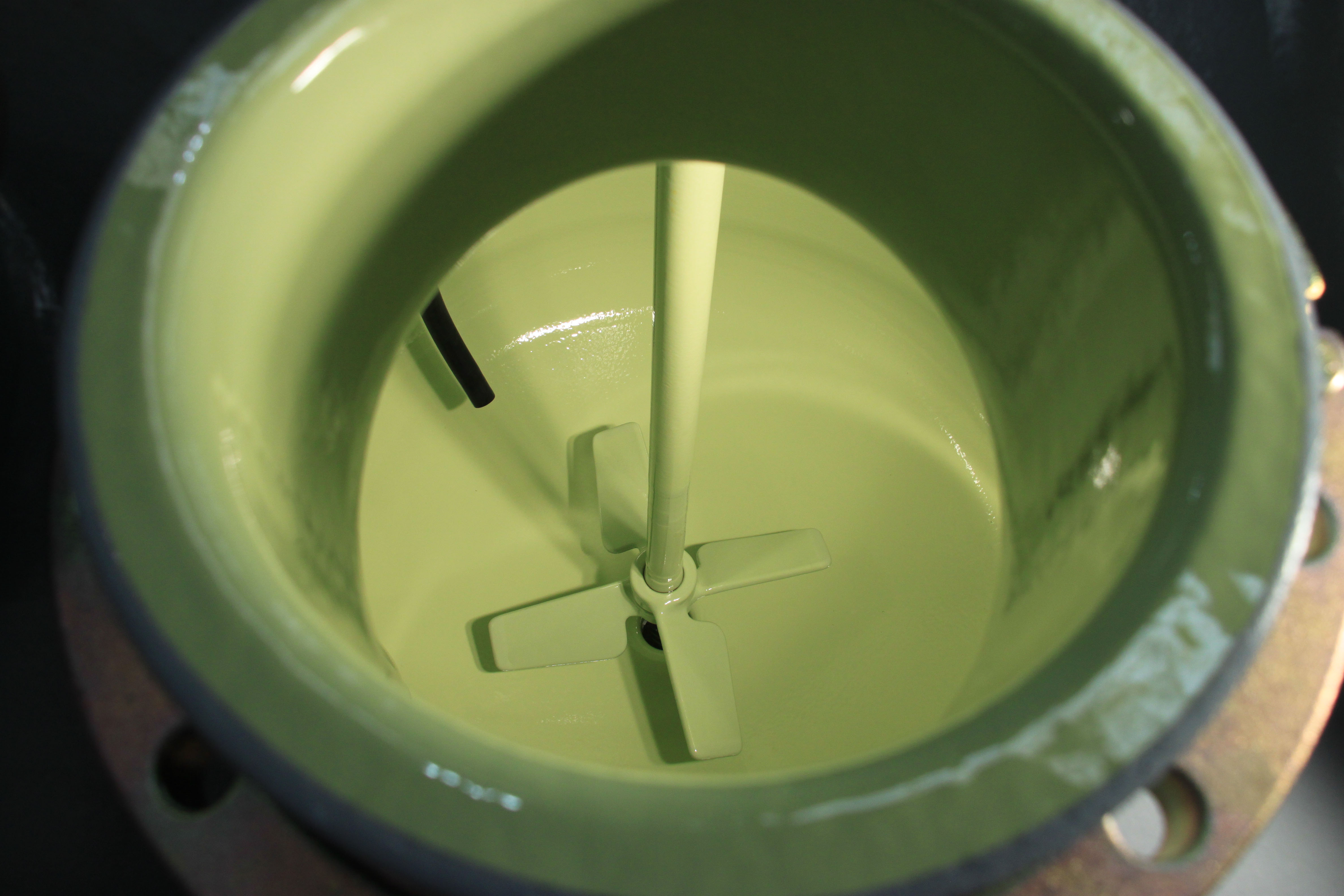
The porcelain-enamelled interior of a chemical reaction vessel

Porcelain enamel is used most often in the manufacture of products that will be expected to come under regular chemical attack or high heat, such as cookware, burners, and laboratory equipment. It is used in the production of many household goods and appliances, especially those used in the kitchen or bathroom area: pots, pans, cooktops, appliances, bathtubs, even walls, counters, and other surfaces.

Porcelain enamel is also used architecturally as a coating for wall panels. It may be used externally to provide weather resistance and desirable appearance, or internally to provide wear resistance; for example, on escalator side panels and tunnel walls. In recent years, agricultural silos have also been constructed with porcelain enamelled steel plates to protect the interior from corrosion and the exterior from weathering; this may indicate a future trend of coating all outdoor mild steel products in a weather-resistant porcelain enamel.

== Enamelling process ==
The application of industrial porcelain enamel is a complex process involving numerous technical steps. All enamelling processes involve the mixture and preparation of frit, the unfired enamel mixture; the preparation of the substrate; the application and firing; and then finishing processes. Most modern applications also involve two layers of enamel: a ground coat to bond to the substrate and a cover coat to provide the desired external properties.

Because frits are frequently mixed at higher temperatures than the firing process requires, most modern industrial enamellers do not mix their frits completely; instead, frit is most often purchased from dedicated frit producers in standard compositions, and any special ingredients are added before application and firing.

=== Frit ===
For ground coats, the composition of a frit for any given application is determined primarily by the metal used as the substrate: different varieties of steel, and different metals such as aluminium and copper, require different frit compositions to bond to them. For cover coats, the frit is composed to bind to the ground-coat and produce the desired external properties. Frit is typically prepared by mixing the ingredients and then milling the mixture into a powder. The ingredients, most often metal oxides and minerals such as quartz (or silica sand), soda ash, borax, and cobalt oxide, are acquired in particulate form; the precise chemical composition and amount of each ingredient must be carefully measured and regulated. Once prepared, this powdered frit is then slumped and stirred to promote even distribution of materials; most frits are smelted at temperatures between 1150 and 1300°C. After smelting, the frit is again milled into a powder, most often by ball mill grinding.

For wet application of enamel, a slurry of frit suspended in water must be created. To remain in suspension, frits must be milled to an extremely fine particle size, or mixed with a suspension agent such as clay or electrolytes.

=== Substrate ===
The metal to be used as a substrate is primarily determined by the application to which the product will be put, independent of any enamel considerations. Most commonly used are steels of various compositions, but also used are aluminium and copper.

Before applying enamel, the substrate's surface must be prepared through several processes. The most critical processes are the cleaning of the surface of the substrate; all remnants of chemicals, rusts, oils, and other contaminants must be removed entirely. To facilitate this, frequent processes performed on substrates are degreasing, pickling (which can also etch the surface and provide anchoring points for the enamel), alkaline neutralization, and rinsing.

=== Application ===
Enamel can be applied to the substrate via various methods. These methods are most often delineated into either wet or dry applications, determined by whether the enamel is applied as a dry powder or a liquid slurry suspension.

==== Dry application ====
The simplest method of dry application, especially for cast-iron substrates, is to heat the substrate and roll it in powdered frit. The frit particles melt on contact with the hot substrate and adhere to its surface. This method requires a high level of operator skill and concentration to achieve an even coating, and due to its inconstant nature, is not often used in industrial applications.

The most common method of dry application used in industry today is electrostatic deposition. Before application, the dry frit must be encapsulated in an organic silane; this allows the frit to hold an electrical charge during application. An electrostatic gun fires the dry frit powder onto an electrically earthed metal substrate; electrical forces bind the charged powder to the substrate, causing it to adhere.

==== Wet application ====
The simplest method of wet application is to dip the substrate in a bath of slurry, which completely immerses all available surfaces of the substrate. Dipping is not often used in industry, however, because many preliminary trial dippings are required before the thickness of the coat can be predicted reliably enough for the desired application.

A form of dipping suitable for modern industrial application is flow coating. Rather than dip the product in a bath of slurry, slurry is flowed over the surface of the substrate to be coated. This method enables a more economical use of slurry and time, allowing for very rapid production runs.

Wet enamel may also be sprayed onto the product using specialized spray guns. Slurry is fed into the nozzle of a spray gun, and compressed air atomizes the slurry and ejects it from the nozzle of the gun in a controlled jet.

=== Firing ===
Firing, where coated substrates are passed through a furnace to experience long periods of stable high temperatures, converts the adhering particles of frit into a continuous glass layer. The effectiveness of the process is highly dependent on the time, temperature, and the quality or thickness of the coating on the substrate. Most frits for industrial applications are fired for as low as 20 minutes, but frits for very heavy-duty industrial applications may take double this time. Porcelain enamel coatings on aluminium substrates may be fired at temperatures as low as 530°C, but most steel substrates require temperatures over 800°C.

== History ==
Vitreous enamel has been applied to jewelry metals such as gold, silver, and copper since antiquity for the purposes of decoration. It was not until the Industrial Revolution that ferrous metals first became the subject of porcelain enamelling processes; these first attempts were met with limited success. A reliably successful technique was not developed until the middle of the 19th century, with the development of a method for enamelling cast-iron cooking pots in Germany. It was not long before this method of enamelling became outdated with the development of new ferrous substrates, and most modern research into porcelain enamelling is concerned with creating an acceptable bond between enamels and new metal substrates.

The production of enamelled products on an industrial scale first began in Germany in 1840. The method used was very primitive compared to modern methods: the product was heated to a very high temperature and then dusted with enamel, which was immediately fired. This frequently resulted in poor adhesion or a spotty coat; two coats were always required to achieve a continuous, corrosion-resistant surface. It could only be applied to cast- and wrought-iron, and only used for relatively simple products like pots and pans.

The ability to apply enamel to sheet steels was not developed until 1900, with the discovery that making minor changes to the composition of the enamel, such as including cobalt oxides as minor components, could drastically improve its adhesion ability to carbon steels. Concurrent with this development was the first use of wet-slurry enamel application; this allowed the enamel to be applied to much more complex shapes by dipping the shape into the liquid enamel slurry.

Until the 1930s, all enamel applications required two coats of enamel: an undercoat to adhere to the substrate, which was always blue (due in part to the presence of cobalt oxides), and a top coat of the desired color (most often white). It was not until 1930 that the use of zero carbon steel (steel with less than 0.005% carbon content) as a substrate was linked to allowing lighter-colored enamels to adhere directly to the substrate.
