= Friction extrusion =

Friction extrusion is a thermo-mechanical process that can be used to form fully consolidated wire, rods, tubes, or other non-circular metal shapes directly from a variety of precursor charges including metal powder, flake, machining waste (chips or swarf) or solid billet. The process imparts unique, and potentially, highly desirable microstructures to the resulting products. Friction extrusion was invented at The Welding Institute in the UK and patented in 1991. It was originally intended primarily as a method for production of homogeneous microstructures and particle distributions in metal matrix composite materials.

== Description of the Process and Essential Process Variables ==
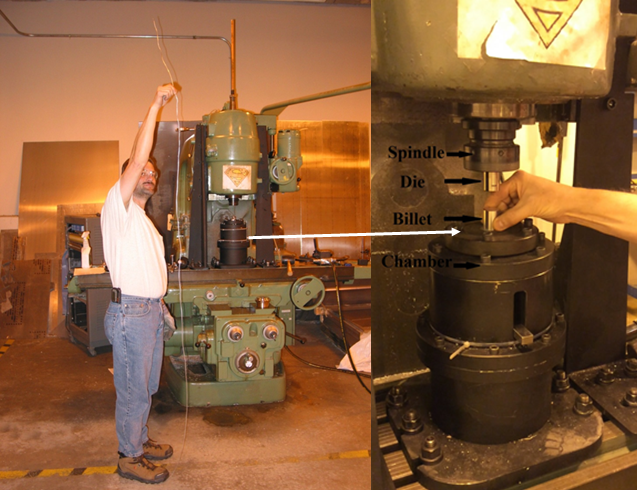
Figure 1. C-frame milling machine modified for friction extrusion. At left is an overview image and at right is a close up of the mechanical spindle which provides die rotation and the hydraulic cylinder that provides the extrusion pressure. Wire is extruded vertically through the hollow draw bar of the milling machine. This configuration corresponds to a direct extrusion with a rotating die: i.e. the charge (billet in this case) is pushed into the rotating die.

As in conventional extrusion processes, in friction extrusion, a shape change is enforced on the charge by forcing its passage through a die. However, friction extrusion differs from conventional extrusion in several key ways. Critically, in the friction extrusion process, the extrusion charge (billet or other precursor) rotates relative to the extrusion die. In addition, similar to conventional extrusion, an extrusion force is applied so as to push the charge against the die. In practice either the die or the charge may rotate or they may be counter-rotating. The relative rotary motion between the charge and the die has several significant effects on the process. First, the relative motion in the plane of rotation leads to large shear stresses, hence, plastic deformation in the layer of charge in contact with and near the die. This plastic deformation is dissipated by recovery and recrystallization processes leading to substantial heating of the deforming charge. Because of the deformation heating, friction extrusion does not generally require preheating of the charge by auxiliary means potentially resulting in a more energy efficient process. Second, the substantial level of plastic deformation in the region of relative rotary motion can promote solid state welding of powders or other finely divided precursors, such as flakes and chips, effectively consolidating the charge (friction consolidation) prior to extrusion. Scrolled features on the face of the die aid material flow into the extrusion orifice which can lead to order of magnitude reduction in extrusion force compared to conventional extrusions of equivalent cross section. Third, the combined effects of elevated temperature and large levels of deformation normally lead the extrudate to have a relatively fine, equiaxed, grain structure which results from recrystallization after the conclusion of deformation: desirable crystallographic textures may also be created by the process and formation of nanocomposite structures are also possible.

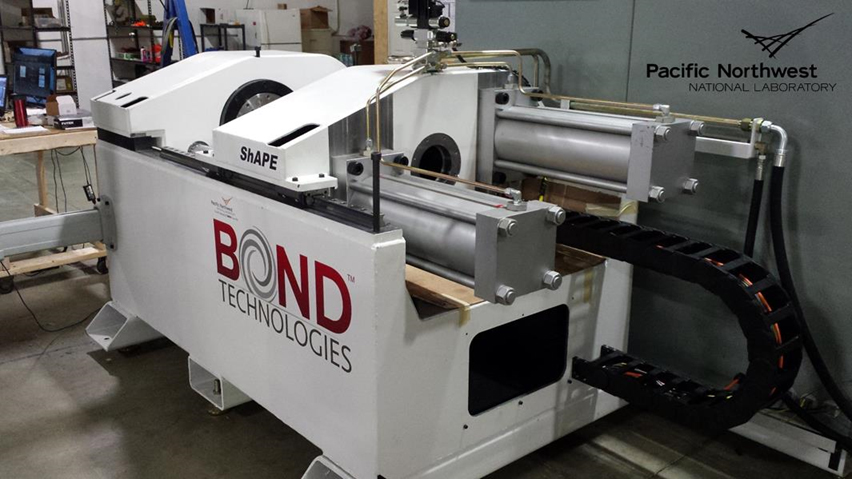
Figure 2. ShAPE™ machine at Pacific Northwest National Laboratory capable of 100 ton linear force and 1000 ft-lb torque at 500 rpm.

Based on the foregoing, it can be said that the essential controlled parameters in friction extrusion are typically:

1. The die rotation rate.
2. The die geometry.
3. The extrusion force normal to the die face or, the rate of die advance into the charge.

The corresponding response parameters include:

1. The required torque and power.
2. The extrusion temperature.
3. The extrusion rate in force controlled extrusion or the extrusion force in rate controlled extrusion.
4. The extrudate microstructure and properties.

== Friction Extrusion Equipment ==
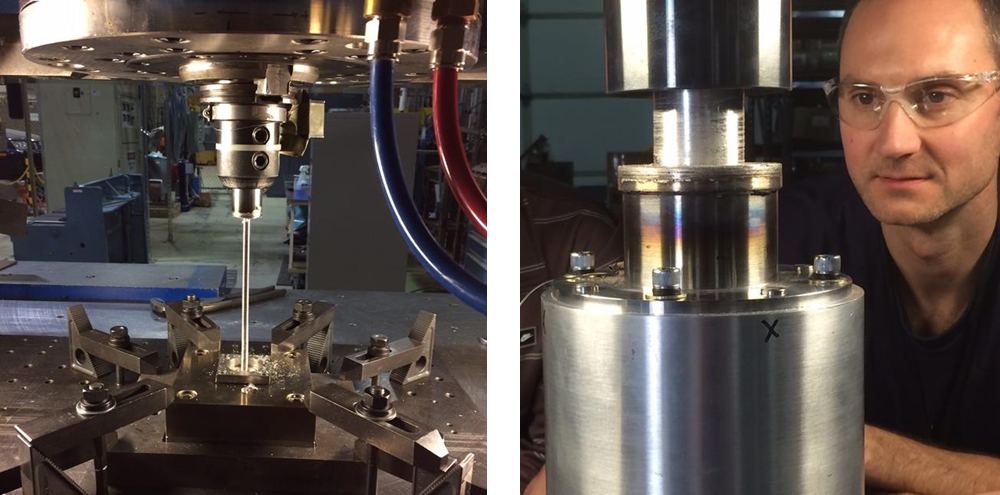
Figure 3. The friction extrusion process is highly scalable. The extrusion on the left has a 7.5mm diameter, the one on the right has a 50 mm diameter. These extrusions were performed on a TTI friction sir welding machine.

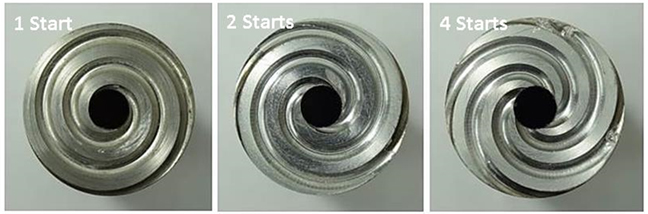
Figure 4. Typical die scroll geometries for making rod and tube. Dies are rotated such that the scrolls aid material flow toward the die opening.

In principle, friction extrusion can be performed on any machine which can produce the required rotary and linear motions between the die and charge. Examples include machines built for friction stir welding, milling machines modified to accommodate the extrusion forces, and purpose built friction extrusion equipment such as the shear assisted processing and extrusion (ShAPE™) machine at the Pacific Northwest National Laboratory. Figures 1-3 show examples of friction extrusion equipment and extruded products. Figure 4 shows typical friction extrusion dies designed for production of wire, rod and tube. Dies are rotated in the direction which enhances material flow toward the extrusion orifice during the process.

== Strain in Friction Extrusion ==
In conventional extrusion, the strain imparted to the charge is loosely defined by the extrusion ratio. The extrusion ratio is simply the cross-sectional area of the extrusion billet, A_{0,} divided by the cross sectional area of the extrudate, A_{f}. The extrusion strain is then e=ln(A_{0}/A_{f}).

In friction extrusion there is an additional strain component which will arise from the shearing motion of the rotating die as it contacts the charge. The strain produced by the rotation of the die results in redundant work as it does not accomplish a shape change. In order to investigate the strain due to shearing, studies have been performed with marker materials embedded in the material to be extruded. After extrusion, these materials are detected by metallographic methods and provide insight regarding the way in which material flows during the extrusion process. Figure 5 shows an example of how the amount of shear strain changes with changing ratios of extrusion rate to die rotation rate. In the limit of very high extrusion rates, the friction extrusion process closely mimics the conventional extrusion process with respect to strain levels.

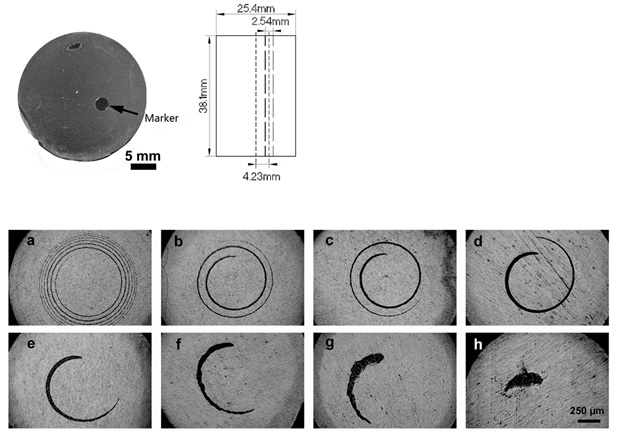
Figure 5. Distribution of AA2195 marker wire in an extruded 6061 wire. The marker was inserted into the billet at 1/3 of the billet radius prior to extrusion. The amount of shearing is a function of the extrusion rate relative to the die rotation rate: this ratio increases from a-h.

== Typical microstructure resulting from friction extrusion ==
Figure 6 shows the cross section and microstructure of a titanium wire produced by friction extrusion of Ti-6-4 powder. Notably, the cross section is fully consolidated and the transformed b microstructure indicates that extrusion likely occurred near 1000 °C (above the beta transus for the alloy). Figure 7 shows grain size and crystallographic orientation typical of thin walled tubing extruded from AZ91 melt spun flake. Grains are refined to less than 5 mm and orientation of the (0001) planes are off-normal due to the rotational shear component. Figure 8 shows examples of friction extruded magnesium alloy tubes. Friction consolidation has also been used to refine grain size and preferentially orient texture in functional materials such as bismuth-telluride thermoelectrics and iron-silicon magnets. Examples of the effect of friction extrusion of microstructure have been reported for AZ31, various aluminum alloys and pure copper.

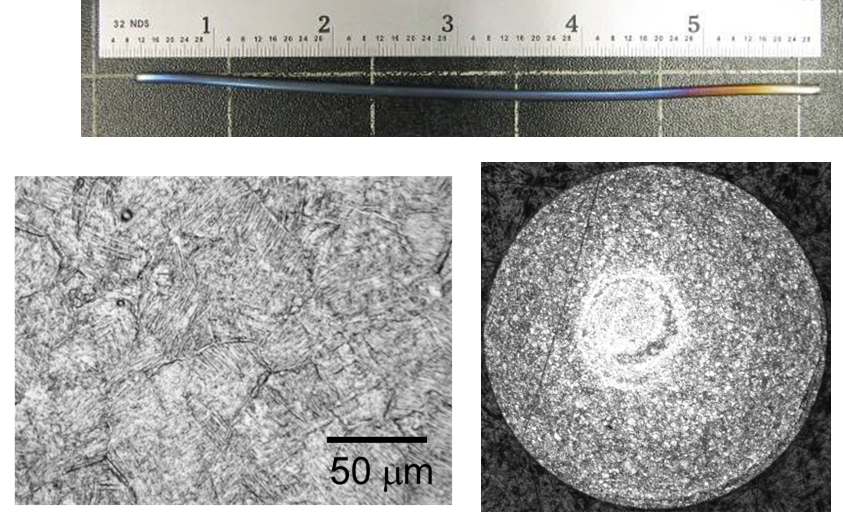
Figure 6. As extruded wire, overall cross section, and microstructure of a wire produced by friction extrusion of Ti-6-4 powder.

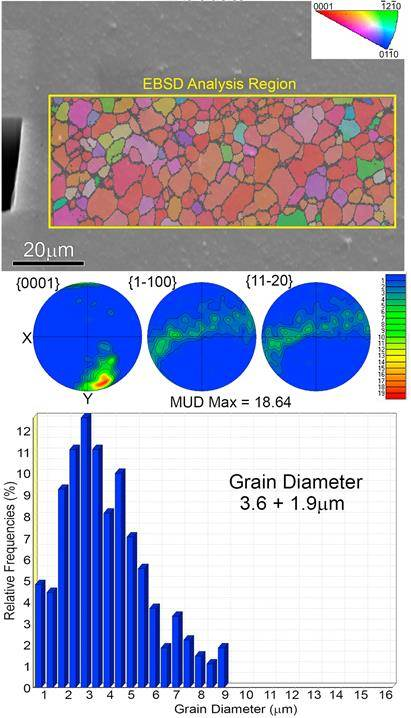
Figure 7. Grain size and texture development in a friction extruded tube produced directly from AZ91 (magnesium alloy) melt spun flake.

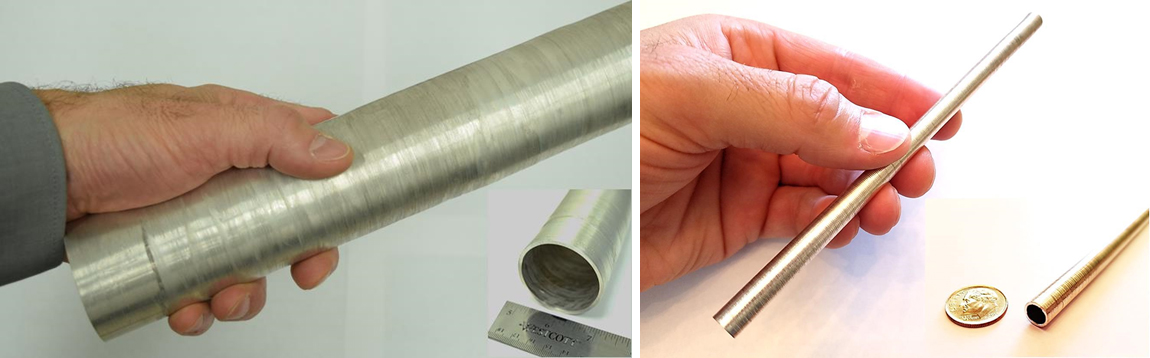
Figure 8. Friction extruded tubes of magnesium alloy ZK60 extruded from a cast billet using the ShAPE machine at Pacific Northwest National Laboratory. The extruded tubes exhibit desirable microstructure and crystallographic texture, which enhance their ductility and ability to absorb deformation energy compared to conventionally extruded tubes.

== Potential of Friction Extrusion for Commercialization ==
1. Creep resistant steel piping.
2. Lightweight magnesium and aluminum structures.
3. Materials with enhanced thermal properties.
4. Recycling of aluminum machining waste and swarf.
5. Nanocomposite functional materials.

== Advantages and Disadvantages Relative to Conventional Extrusion ==
=== Advantages ===
1. Potential for significantly lower power consumption and extrusion force compared to conventional extrusion due to rotational shear generating the necessary process heat and scroll features aiding material flow into the extrusion orifice.
2. Friction extrusion is capable of refining microstructure from powder/flake/chip (bottom-up) and solid billets (top-down).
3. Enables extrusion of materials, such as Mg_{2}Si which cannot be readily extruded by conventional means.
4. As a solid-phase process, friction extrusion can be done at low temperature thereby retaining nanoscale second phases and particles present in precursor material. Enables fabrication of bulk nanocomposite materials.
5. Enables enhanced bulk properties, such as energy absorption in magnesium alloys.

=== Disadvantages ===
1. Extrusion rates competitive with conventional extrusion processes have yet to be demonstrated.
2. Uniformity of microstructure and material properties are difficult to obtain in plane perpendicular to extrusion direction because the imposed strain is non-uniform.
3. Full range of process scalability has not been assessed.
