= Keller's reagent =

Keller's reagent can refer to two different reagents:

- Keller's reagent (metallurgy), used to etch aluminum alloys
- Keller's reagent (organic), used to detect alkaloids
