= Real Ispat and Power =

REAL Group | Real Ispat and Power and Ltd
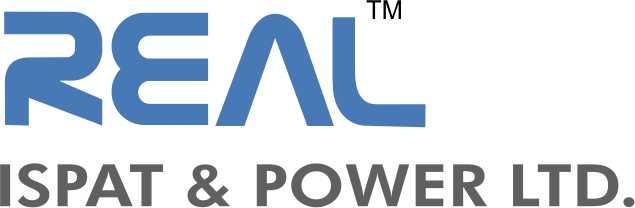
- Company type: Private Limited company
- Industry: Steel industry
- Founded: 1999; 27 years ago
- Headquarters: Raipur, India
- Key people: Rajesh Agrawal; Umesh Agrawal; Ramesh Agrawal
- Products: Sponge Iron, Power, Billet, TMT Rebars, Wire Rod, HB Wire, Binding Wire, GI Wire, Barbed Wire, Eco Bricks
- Brands: GK TMT Rebars; REAL Wire
- Website: www.realgroup.org

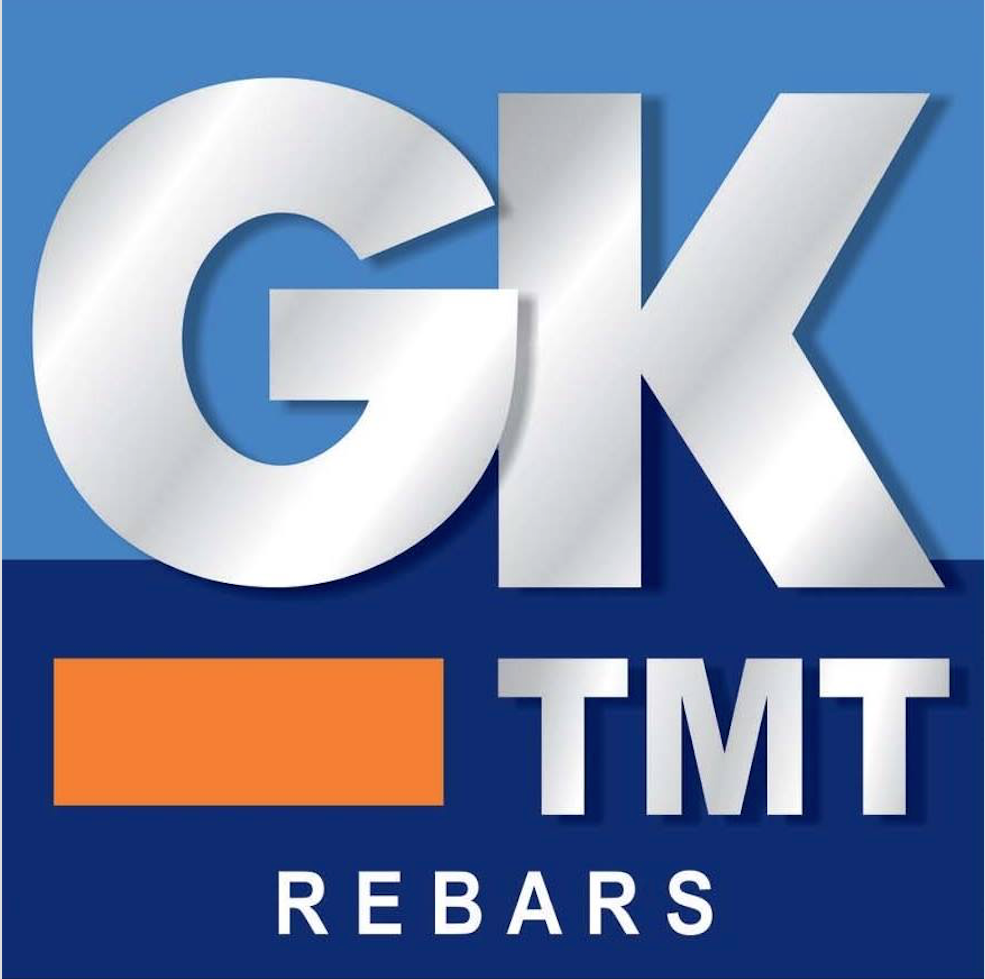
GK TMT Rebars Logo

REAL Group | Real Ispat and Power Limited (RIPL) is an Indian integrated steel and electric power manufacturing firm based in Raipur, Chhattisgarh, India. The company manufactures sponge iron, power, billet, TMT rebars, wire rod, H.B. wire, binding wire, galvanized iron (GI) wire, barbed wire and eco bricks. The main company brands are Real Wire and GK TMT rebars.

== History ==
RIPL, the flagship company of the Real Group, was incorporated on October 4, 1999, as Real Ispat Pvt Ltd, with the objective of manufacturing steel.

It was reconstituted as a limited company with the current name on May 6, 2005. The company's final products, thermos-mechanically-treated (TMT) bars, wire rods, and steel wires were sold under the GK TMT Rebars and Real Wire brand names.

REAL Group's subsidiaries are as below. All four plants of the REAL Group are in Chhattisgarh, with its head-office in City Raipur.

== Manufacturing units ==
- Real Ispat and Power Ltd
- API Ispat and Powertech Private Limited
- Shivalay Ispat and Power Private Limited
- Real Ispat and Energy Private Limited
