= Acid etching =

Acid etching may mean:

- Glass etching, etching glass
- Etching, acid etching of metal surfaces in printing
- Printed circuit board § Chemical etching, acid etching in the production of circuit boards
- Chemical milling, industrial acid etching
