= Photochemical machining =

Process that uses chemicals to machine sheet metal

Photochemical etching (center), compared to reactive ion etching (bottom)

Photochemical machining (PCM), also known as photochemical milling or photo etching, is a chemical milling process used to fabricate sheet metal components using a photoresist and etchants to corrosively machine away selected areas. This process emerged in the 1960s as an offshoot of the printed circuit board industry. Photo etching can produce highly complex parts with very fine detail accurately and economically.

This process can offer economical alternatives to stamping, punching, laser or water jet cutting, or wire electrical discharge machining (EDM) for thin gauge precision parts. The tooling is inexpensive and quickly produced. This makes the process useful for prototyping and allows for easy changes in mass production. It maintains dimensional tolerances and does not create burrs or sharp edges. It can make a part in hours after receiving the drawing.

PCM can be used on virtually any commercially available metal or alloy, of any hardness. It is limited to materials with a thickness of 0.0005 to 0.080 in (0.013 to 2.032 mm). Metals include aluminium, brass, copper, inconel, manganese, nickel, silver, steel, stainless steel, zinc and titanium.

Photochemical machining is a form of photo engraving, and a similar process in microfabrication is called photolithography.

== Process ==
The process starts by printing the shape of the part onto optically clear and dimensionally stable photographic film. The "phototool" consists of two sheets of this film showing negative images of the parts (meaning that the area that will become the parts is clear and all of the areas to be etched are black). The two sheets are optically and mechanically registered to form the top and bottom halves of the tool.

The metal sheets are cut to size, cleaned and then laminated on both sides with a UV-sensitive photoresist. The coated metal is placed between the two sheets of the phototool and a vacuum is drawn to ensure intimate contact between the phototool and the metal plate. The plate is then exposed in UV light that allows the areas of resist that are in the clear sections of the film to be hardened. After exposure, the plate is "developed", washing away the unexposed resist and leaving the areas to be etched unprotected.

The etching line is a multi-chambered machine that has driven-wheel conveyors to move the plates and arrays of spray nozzles above and below the plates. The etchant is typically an aqueous solution of acid, frequently ferric chloride, that is heated and directed under pressure to both sides of the plate. The etchant reacts with the unprotected metal essentially corroding it away fairly quickly. After neutralizing and rinsing, the remaining resist is removed and the sheet of parts is cleaned and dried.

== Applications ==
Thin gauge (under 0.050 in (1.3 mm)) parts in a broad range of alloys are candidates for photo etching.

Industrial applications include fine screens and meshes, apertures and masks, battery grids, fuel cell components, sensors, springs, pressure membranes, heat sinks, flexible heating elements, RF and microwave circuits and components, semiconductor leadframes, motor and transformer laminations, metal gaskets and seals, shields and retainers, electrical contacts, encoders and light choppers, EMI/RFI shields, jewelry and washers.

== Economics ==
Phototooling is quick and inexpensive to produce. Most phototools costs less than $350 and can be produced in two days or less. Unlike "hard" tools, such as stamping and punching dies, phototools are exposed only to light and therefore do not suffer wear. Due to the cost of hard tooling for stamping and fine blanking, significant volume is required to justify the expense. Some parts, such as semiconductor leadframes, are so complex and fragile that, despite volumes in the millions of pieces, they can only be produced by photo etching.

In PCM, the unit of labor is the sheet. Therefore, it is most economical to plan the largest sheet size possible consistent with the size and dimensional tolerances of the part. The more parts per sheet the lower the unit labor cost per part.

Material thickness affects costs as a function of the length of time to etch through. Most alloys etch at rates between 0.0005–0.001 in (0.013–0.025 mm) of depth per minute per side.

In general, steel, copper or aluminium workpieces with a thicknesses up to 0.020 in (0.51 mm), part costs will approximate $0.15–0.20 per square inch. As the geometry of the part becomes more complex, photochemical machining gains greater economic advantage over sequential processes such as CNC punching, laser or water-jet cutting, and electrical discharge machining.
