= Heterogenia Linguistico =

Japanese manga series

- Heterogenia Linguistico: An Introduction to Interspecies Linguistics
- First tankōbon volume cover

ヘテロゲニア リンギスティコ ～異種族言語学入門～ (Heterogenia Ringisutiko ~ Ishuzoku Gengogaku Nyūmon ~)
- Genre: Fantasy comedy
- Manga
- Written by: Salt Seno
- Published by: Kadokawa Shoten
- English publisher: NA: Yen Press
- Imprint: Kadokawa Comics A
- Magazine: Young Ace Up
- Original run: March 9, 2018 – present
- Volumes: 7

Heterogenia Linguistico: An Introduction to Interspecies Linguistics (ヘテロゲニア リンギスティコ ～異種族言語学入門～, Heterogenia Ringisutiko ~ Ishuzoku Gengogaku Nyūmon ~) is a Japanese manga series written and illustrated by Salt Seno. It began serialization on Kadokawa Shoten's Young Ace Up manga website in March 2018.

== Synopsis ==
Hakaba, a rookie researcher, is entrusted with fieldwork in the demon world in place of an injured professor. With Susuki, a young girl who is a demi-human, as his guide, he continues his journey while trying to communicate with the monsters, who do not speak his language.

== Publication ==
Written and illustrated by Salt Seno, Heterogenia Linguistico: An Introduction to Interspecies Linguistics began serialization on Kadokawa Shoten's Young Ace Up manga website on March 9, 2018. Its chapters have been compiled into seven tankōbon volumes as of August 2026. The series is licensed in English by Yen Press.

No.	Original release date	Original ISBN	North American release date	North American ISBN
1	December 4, 2018	978-4-04-107620-0	October 27, 2020	978-1-9753-1807-9
Logs 1–10; Bonus
2	October 4, 2019	978-4-04-108597-4	January 19, 2021	978-1-9753-1809-3
Logs 11–19; Bonus
3	September 4, 2020	978-4-04-109748-9	June 29, 2021	978-1-9753-2425-4
Logs 20–27; Bonus
4	December 28, 2021	978-4-04-109749-6	December 13, 2022	978-1-9753-6002-3
Logs 28–36; Bonus
5	July 4, 2023	978-4-04-113158-9	June 18, 2024	978-1-9753-9456-1
Logs 37–44; Bonus
6	November 1, 2024	978-4-04-115486-1	January 20, 2026	979-8-8554-2027-2
Logs 45–53; Bonus
7	August 4, 2026	978-4-04-117004-5	—	—

== Reception ==
The series' first volume was recommended by Mafia Kajita.

The series, alongside Sweat and Soap and Dr. Stone, was ranked seventeenth in the 2020 edition of Takarajimasha's Kono Manga ga Sugoi! guidebook for the best manga for male readers. The series was also nominated for the sixth Next Manga Awards in the web category in 2020.
