= Sweat and Soap =

Japanese manga series

- First volume cover, featuring Asako Yaeshima (left) and Kotaro Natori

あせとせっけん (Ase to Sekken)
- Genre: Romantic comedy; Slice of life
- Manga
- Written by: Kintetsu Yamada
- Published by: Kodansha
- English publisher: NA: Kodansha USA
- Magazine: D Morning (June 21, 2018 – August 22, 2019); Morning (October 3, 2019 – January 7, 2021)
- Original run: June 21, 2018 – January 7, 2021
- Volumes: 11
- Television drama
- Directed by: Shūhei Shibue; Yuki Kumagai
- Written by: Moral; Tete Inoue; Santa Ikegame
- Original network: MBS
- Original run: February 4, 2022 – April 1, 2022
- Episodes: 9
- icon

Sweat and Soap (Japanese: あせとせっけん, Hepburn: Ase to Sekken) is a Japanese manga series written and illustrated by Kintetsu Yamada. It was serialized in Kodansha's digital seinen manga magazine D Morning from June 2018 to August 2019, and later in Morning from October 2019 to January 2021, with its chapters collected in eleven tankōbon volumes. A nine-episode television drama adaptation was broadcast on MBS from February to April 2022.

== Plot ==
Asako Yaeshima is a timid office worker at Lilia Drop, a toiletry company. Asako loves the company, because she is ashamed of her sweating problems and body odor, and the scent of the soap produced by the company is the only thing capable of undermining her insecurities. However, when Kotaro Natori, the company's lead product developer, approaches her and gets a deep whiff, he states that he loves Asako's smell and finds her inspirational. As the two continue to meet for work, Asako begins to care less about being sniffed by Kotaro, and they start a romantic relationship.

== Characters ==
Asako Yaeshima (八重島 麻子, Yaeshima Asako)
Portrayed by: Yuno Ōhara
Kotaro Natori (名取 香太郎, Natori Kotaro)
Portrayed by: Kanta Sato
Korisu Ichise
Portrayed by: Haruka Kudō
Keita Yaeshima
Portrayed by: Kazuto Mokudai
Yūji Suzumura
Portrayed by: Shūzō Ōhira
Maki Sakashita
Portrayed by: Ayaka Nakata
Osamu Hashitani
Portrayed by: Yūsaku Mori
Jin Ōkura
Portrayed by: Mansaku Ikeuchi

== Media ==
=== Manga ===
Written and illustrated by Kintetsu Yamada, a one-shot chapter of Sweat and Soap was published on Kodansha's digital manga magazine D Morning on January 4, 2018. It was later published as a full-fledged serialized manga in the same magazine from June 21, 2018, to August 22, 2019. The series was then transferred to Morning, being serialized from October 3, 2019, to January 7, 2021. Kodansha collected its chapters in eleven tankōbon volumes, released from October 10, 2018, to May 21, 2021.

In North America, Kodansha USA announced the English language release of the manga in July 2019. The eleven volumes were published from February 25, 2020, to December 14, 2021.

After the serialization, Yamada published a 24-page doujinshi titled Kodomo Tsukuru Hon (こどもつくる本; 'A Book of Making a Baby') in Comitia 136 in June 2021. The story is about Asako and Kotaro having sex without contraception for the first time.

==== Volumes ====
No.	Original release date	Original ISBN	English release date	English ISBN
1	October 10, 2018	978-4-06-513342-2	February 25, 2020	978-1-64659-336-1
2	January 23, 2019	978-4-06-514297-4	April 28, 2020	978-1-64659-474-0
3	April 23, 2019	978-4-06-515186-0	August 18, 2020	978-1-64659-573-0
4	July 23, 2019	978-4-06-516516-4	October 20, 2020	978-1-64651-006-1
5	October 23, 2019	978-4-06-517224-7; 978-4-06-517777-8 (LE)	January 5, 2021	978-1-64659-435-1
6	January 23, 2020	978-4-06-518208-6; 978-4-06-518783-8 (LE)	June 1, 2021	978-1-64659-766-6
7	April 23, 2020	978-4-06-519205-4; 978-4-06-519708-0 (LE)	July 27, 2021	978-1-64659773-4
8	July 20, 2020	978-4-06-520281-4; 978-4-06-520364-4 (LE)	August 31, 2021	978-1-64659779-6
9	November 20, 2020	978-4-06-520980-6; 978-4-06-521127-4 (LE)	September 21, 2021	978-1-63699390-4
10	February 22, 2021	978-4-06-522342-0; 978-4-06-522341-3 (LE)	November 16, 2021	978-1-63699391-1
11	May 21, 2021	978-4-06-523109-8; 978-4-06-523274-3 (LE)	December 14, 2021	978-1-64651297-3

=== Drama ===
In January 2022, it was announced that the series would receive a television drama adaptation, which was broadcast on MBS's Drama Tokku programming block from February 4 to April 1 of the same year. (Note: MBS lists the air dates for the series on Thursday at 25:09, which is effectively Friday at 1:09 a.m. JST.)

== Reception ==
Sweat and Soap placed second in the third annual Tsutaya Comic Awards in 2019. The series also placed ninth in the fifth Next Manga Awards in the digital category. Alongside Dr. Stone and Heterogenia Linguistico, the series ranked 17th on Takarajimasha's Kono Manga ga Sugoi! list of best manga of 2020 for male readers. It ranked sixth on "Nationwide Bookstore Employees' Recommended Comics of 2020" by the Honya Club online bookstore. The manga was nominated for the 45th Kodansha Manga Award in the general category in 2021.

Rebecca Silverman of Anime News Network noted that while the central "sniff-based" romance premise was somewhat awkward, the series was ultimately worth reading. She found it easy to become invested in the relationship between Asako and Natori, which she considered the most crucial element for a romance narrative. Writing for Otaku USA, Brittany Vincent described the protagonists' relationship as enviable and praised the story for its unique premise and well-paced narrative. Demelza of Anime UK News acknowledged that the initial premise could be perceived as off-putting but was surprised by the series' wholesome and heartwarming content. She concluded that it was a compelling read and recommended it for those seeking a sweet love story featuring adult characters.
