= Thermomechanical processing =

Metallurgical process

Thermomechanical processing is a metallurgical process that combines mechanical or plastic deformation process like compression or forging, rolling, etc. with thermal processes like heat-treatment, water quenching, heating and cooling at various rates into a single process.

== Application in rebar steel ==
The quenching process produces a high strength bar from inexpensive low carbon steel. The process quenches the surface layer of the bar, which pressurizes and deforms the crystal structure of intermediate layers, and simultaneously begins to temper the quenched layers using the heat from the bar's core.

Steel billets 130mm² ("pencil ingots") are heated to approximately 1200°C to 1250°C in a reheat furnace. Then, they are progressively rolled to reduce the billets to the final size and shape of reinforcing bar. After the last rolling stand, the billet moves through a quench box. The quenching converts the billet's surface layer to martensite, and causes it to shrink. The shrinkage pressurizes the core, helping to form the correct crystal structures. The core remains hot, and austenitic. A microprocessor controls the water flow to the quench box, to manage the temperature difference through the cross-section of the bars. The correct temperature difference assures that all processes occur, and bars have the necessary mechanical properties.

The bar leaves the quench box with a temperature gradient through its cross section. As the bar cools, heat flows from the bar's centre to its surface so that the bar's heat and pressure correctly tempers an intermediate ring of martensite and bainite.

Finally, the slow cooling after quenching automatically tempers the austenitic core to ferrite and pearlite on the cooling bed.

These bars therefore exhibit a variation in microstructure in their cross section, having strong, tough, tempered martensite in the surface layer of the bar, an intermediate layer of martensite and bainite, and a refined, tough and ductile ferrite and pearlite core.

When the cut ends of TMT bars are etched in Nital (a mixture of nitric acid and methanol), three distinct rings appear: 1. A tempered outer ring of martensite, 2. A semi-tempered middle ring of martensite and bainite, and 3. a mild circular core of bainite, ferrite and pearlite. This is the desired micro structure for quality construction rebar.

In contrast, lower grades of rebar are twisted when cold, work hardening them to increase their strength. However, after thermo mechanical treatment (TMT), bars do not need more work hardening. As there is no twisting during TMT, no torsional stress occurs, and so torsional stress cannot form surface defects in TMT bars. Therefore TMT bars resist corrosion better than cold, twisted and deformed (CTD) bars.

After thermomechanical processing, some grades in which TMT Bars can be covered includes Fe: 415 /500 /550/ 600. These are much stronger compared with conventional CTD Bars and give up to 20% more strength to concrete structure with same quantity of steel.
