= Keller's reagent (metallurgy) =

Chemical reagent in metallurgy

Hazards
- GHS labelling
| Pictograms | (GHS03: Oxidizing) (GHS05: Corrosive) (GHS06: Toxic) (GHS07: Exclamation mark) |
| Signal word | Danger |
| Hazard statements | H272, H290, H300, H310, H314, H330, H335 |
| Precautionary statements | P210, P220, P221, P234, P260, P262, P264, P270, P271, P280, P284, P301+P310, P302+P350, P305+P351+P338, P310, P320, P321, P330, P361, P363, P370+P378, P403+P233, P405, P501 |
| NFPA 704 (fire diamond) | 4 0 |
- Except where otherwise noted, data are given for materials in their standard state (at 25 °C [77 °F], 100 kPa). Infobox references

In metallurgy, Keller's reagent is a mixture of nitric acid, hydrochloric acid, and hydrofluoric acid, used to etch aluminum alloys to reveal their grain boundaries and orientations. It is also sometimes called Dix–Keller reagent, after E. H. Dix, Jr., and Fred Keller of the Aluminum Corporation of America, who pioneered the use of this technique in the late 1920s and early 1930s.

== Safety ==
Keller's reagent contains oxidizing nitric acid and toxic hydrofluoric acid. The reagent and its fumes may be lethal via contact, inhalation of its fumes, etc. Hydrogen produced on contact with some metals may pose a fire hazard.

== See also ==
- Aqua regia
