= Dr. Stone =

Japanese manga series

- First tankōbon volume cover, featuring Senku Ishigami
- Genre: Adventure; Post-apocalyptic; Science fiction
- Manga
- Written by: Riichiro Inagaki
- Illustrated by: Boichi
- Published by: Shueisha
- English publisher: NA: Viz Media
- Imprint: Jump Comics
- Magazine: Weekly Shōnen Jump
- English magazine: NA: Weekly Shonen Jump
- Original run: March 6, 2017 – March 7, 2022
- Volumes: 27
- Anime television series
- Directed by: Shinya Iino (S1–2); Shūhei Matsushita (SP, S3–4)
- Written by: Yuichiro Kido (S1–3, SP); Kurasumi Sunayama (S4)
- Music by: Tatsuya Kato; Hiroaki Tsutsumi; Yuki Kanesaka
- Studio: TMS Entertainment: 8PAN (S1–2); Die4Studio (SP, S3–4)
- Licensed by: Crunchyroll; SEA: Medialink
- Original network: Tokyo MX, KBS, SUN, BS11, TVh, TBC, TVA, TVQ
- English network: US: Adult Swim (Toonami)
- Original run: July 5, 2019 – June 25, 2026
- Episodes: 94 + SP
- Manga

Dr. Stone Reboot: Byakuya
- Written by: Boichi
- Published by: Shueisha
- English publisher: NA: Viz Media
- Imprint: Jump Comics
- Magazine: Weekly Shōnen Jump
- Original run: October 28, 2019 – December 23, 2019
- Volumes: 1
- Video game

Dr. Stone: Battle Craft
- Developer: Poppin Games Japan
- Publisher: Poppin Games Japan
- Genre: Strategy
- Platform: Android, iOS
- Released: JP: September 1, 2021; NA: November 28, 2023
- Anime

Dr. Stone: Terraforming
- icon

Dr. Stone (stylized as Dr.STONE) is a Japanese manga series written by Riichiro Inagaki and illustrated by the South Korean artist Boichi. It was serialized in Shueisha's shōnen manga magazine Weekly Shōnen Jump from March 2017 to March 2022, with its chapters collected in 27 tankōbon volumes. The story follows Senku Ishigami, a scientific genius who plans to rebuild civilization after humanity was mysteriously petrified for 3,700 years.

In North America, the manga was licensed by Viz Media. Shueisha began to simulpublish the series in English on the website and app Manga Plus in January 2019. An anime television series adaptation produced by TMS Entertainment aired on Tokyo MX from July to December 2019. A second season, titled Dr. Stone: Stone Wars, aired from January to March 2021. A television special that takes place between the second and third seasons, titled Dr. Stone: Ryusui, aired in July 2022. A third season, titled Dr. Stone: New World, aired for two split cours; the first cours from April to June 2023, and the second cours from October to December 2023. A fourth and final season, titled Dr. Stone: Science Future, aired for three split cours; the first cours from January to March 2025, the second cours from July to September 2025, and the third and final cours from April to June 2026. A sequel based on the Terraforming one-shot has been announced.

By March 2026, the manga had over 20 million copies in circulation. In 2019, Dr. Stone won the 64th Shogakukan Manga Award for the shōnen category.

== Plot ==
In June 2019, a mysterious green flash suddenly petrifies ostensibly all humans. The human race is petrified in stone for 3,719 years until in April 5738, when 15-year-old prodigy Senku Ishigami is suddenly revived to find himself in a world where all traces of human civilization have been eroded by time. Senku sets up a base camp and begins to study the petrified humans in order to determine the cause of the event, as well as a cure. Over the next six months, Senku's friend Taiju Oki wakes up and Senku learns their revival was made possible with nitric acid. With this discovery, they develop a compound that will allow them to instantly revive others. They begin by reviving a famous high school martial artist named Tsukasa Shishio and their classmate Yuzuriha Ogawa with the goal of rebuilding civilization with a focus on science.

Tsukasa ultimately reveals that he opposes Senku's idea of forming a new scientific civilization, believing the old world was tainted and should not be restored. Instead, he desires to establish a new world order based on power and strength, going so far as to destroy any petrified adults he encounters in order to prevent them from interfering with his goals. After extorting the formula for the revival compound from Senku, Tsukasa attempts to murder him when he realizes that Senku knows how to create weapons that he cannot defend against. Believing he successfully killed Senku, Tsukasa leaves to begin establishing his own faction in the Stone World.

After recovering from his near death experience, Senku discovers a tribe of people already living on the planet and sees this as an opportunity to create his Kingdom of Science. These people are originally hesitant, but eventually learn the benefits that science can bring to their survival. Over time, Senku becomes more trusted by the tribe, eventually being taught of their past where the village was started by his adoptive father Byakuya, along with five other astronauts, who were unaffected due to being in the International Space Station at the time of the petrification event. Together with his new allies and friends, Senku's Kingdom of Science engages in a war with the Tsukasa Empire, ultimately emerging victorious and affirming themselves as a force to be reckoned with. After the victory, they discover that Byakuya had left platinum which can be used as catalyst to mass-produce revival fluid in the nearby island which is now inhabited by a tribe known as the Petrification Kingdom, who possess the device used to petrify the world so long ago.

After defeating Ibara, who had established a dictatorship on the island, the Kingdom of Science discovered the exact location of Why-Man, the mastermind behind the petrification. They then decide to establish multiple cities across every continent to gather the materials needed to build a rocket to the Moon and find Why-Man. Aboard the ship Perseus, the team heads to North America where they encounter the bittersweet Dr. Xeno, Stanley Snyder, and their companions who are more technologically advanced. After an air duel, the Kingdom of Science takes Dr. Xeno hostage and heads to South America. With Stanley in hot pursuit, they travel across the Andes mountain range and into the Amazon rainforest to discover the origin of the first petrification wave. They set up camp and train to fight Stanley and his forces. After a fierce battle, the entire world is hit by a second worldwide petrification wave. Only Suika is left alive, having been revived by the forces of nature.

Suika spends the next seven years learning how to make nitric acid and succeeds in reviving her friends. They leave the reformed Dr. Xeno and a few others behind to build the rocket while Senku sets off to revive Sai, a brilliant Indian mathematician. After much strenuous effort, they finally build a rocket for Senku, Kohaku, and Stanley to board. Ryusui joins them later. They head to the Moon where they finally uncover the truth about Why-Man.

== Production ==
Dr. Stone was one from a number of story proposals Riichiro Inagaki brought to his editor, who chose it because he had no idea how it would develop. Boichi, who was looking for a story to work on, was approached around the time Inagaki (a fan of his art) finished the storyboards for chapter three. Inagaki first began working on Dr. Stone with the initial idea of creating a protagonist that was considered a relatively normal character unlike many others within the genre. He decided that his best approach with creating Senku was to create a character that was ambitious and chose to actively push themselves through hard work in order to fulfill their goals. He also wanted to create a character that closely resembled the character Agon Kongo from his own manga serialization Eyeshield 21 in terms of personality and characteristics and felt that it was appropriate for the chosen setting. Inagaki was personally fascinated by the topic of science as a child and sought to create a science-based story for entertainment purposes that also featured common themes and messages that would be compelling for the audience. In regards to influences, Inagaki stated that Video Girl Ai was a series that had a significant impact on the story's development.

Inagaki worked remotely with his illustrator Boichi in which the former sent his own created storyboards to the latter through his own editor. By the time the pair began working on the series, Inagaki was already quite familiar with Boichi's work as an artist and initially struggled with expressing his ideas for his collaborator to illustrate, oftentimes being uncertain about how to draw some of Senku's inventions and how to make them feel impressive. While developing the setting for the series, Boichi grew captivated imagining how to create the look of a futuristic Japan set 3,700 years after humanity had turned to stone. He settled upon the idea of creating a vast beautiful world in which Japan's nature was left untarnished due to the loss of humanity's influence. When asked about scientific accuracies, Inagaki revealed that both himself and Boichi have conducted research into the subject during the development of the series while also receiving help from a consultant.

=== Adaptation ===
Director Shinya Iino expressed that one of the challenges with adapting the series into animation was determining how the backgrounds would appear in a different medium. He would go on to state that Boichi had provided his assistance by sending his own rough sketches as a way to facilitate the adaptation process. Iino would also state that the theme of science, featured in the story, captured his attention, as it was not a theme that was featured in many other shōnen manga series.

== Media ==
=== Manga ===
Written by Riichiro Inagaki and illustrated by Boichi, Dr. Stone was serialized for five years in Shueisha's shōnen manga magazine Weekly Shōnen Jump from March 6, 2017, to March 7, 2022. Shueisha collected its 232 individual chapters in 26 tankōbon volumes, released between July 7, 2017, and July 4, 2022. An additional chapter, "Dr. Stone: Terraforming", was published on July 4, 2022. A 27th tankōbon volume was released on April 4, 2024.

At its panel at Anime Boston, Viz Media announced the license of the manga. The 26 volumes were released from September 4, 2018, to July 4, 2023. Viz Media released the 27th volume on June 3, 2025. Shueisha began to simulpublish the series in English on the website and app Manga Plus in January 2019.

A nine-chapter spin-off, Dr. Stone Reboot: Byakuya, was published in Weekly Shōnen Jump from October 28 to December 23, 2019. A collected tankōbon volume was released on March 4, 2020. Viz Media published the volume on March 2, 2021. A three-chapter spin-off, Dr. Stone: 4D Science, set after the main series finale, was published in Weekly Shōnen Jump from November 6 to December 25, 2023. It was collected in the 27th volume along with "Dr. Stone: Terraforming".

=== Anime ===
An anime television series adaptation was announced in Weekly Shōnen Jump on November 19, 2018. The series is animated by TMS Entertainment, with Shinya Iino as director, Yuichiro Kido as scriptwriter, and Yuko Iwasa as character designer. Tatsuya Kato, Hiroaki Tsutsumi, and Yuki Kanesaka composed the series' music. The first season aired from July 5 to December 13, 2019, on Tokyo MX and other networks. It ran for 24 episodes. The first opening theme is "Good Morning World!", performed by Burnout Syndromes, while the series' first ending theme is "Life", performed by Rude-α. The second opening theme is "Sangenshoku" (三原色; lit. 'Primary Colors'), performed by Pelican Fanclub, while the series' second ending theme is "Yume no Youna" (夢のような; lit. 'Like a Dream'), performed by Saeki YouthK.

A second season of the anime adaptation was announced after the first season's finale. The second season focused on the story of the "Stone Wars" arc from the manga series. Subtitled Stone Wars, the second season aired for eleven episodes from January 14 to March 25, 2021. The opening theme for the second season is "Rakuen" (楽園; lit. 'Paradise'), performed by Fujifabric, while the ending theme for the second season is "Koe?" (声?; lit. 'A voice?'), performed by Hatena.

A sequel to the TV series was announced after the second season's final episode aired. At the Jump Festa '22 event, it was revealed that a third season would premiere in 2023. A television special titled Dr. Stone: Ryusui that focuses on the character Ryusui Nanami premiered on July 10, 2022. Shūhei Matsushita directed the special, while the rest of the main staff returned from previous seasons. After the airing of the special, a third season, subtitled New World, was revealed, with Matsushita returning to direct. It consisted of two split season cours; the first cours aired for eleven episodes from April 6 to June 15, 2023. For the first cours of the season, the opening theme is "Wasuregataki" (ワスレガタキ; lit. 'Hard to Forget'), performed by Huwie Ishizaki, while the ending theme is "Where Do We Go?", performed by Okamoto's. The second cours was broadcast for eleven episodes from October 12 to December 21, 2023. For the second cours of the season, the opening theme is "Haruka" (遥か; lit. 'Far Away') by Ryujin Kiyoshi, while the ending theme is "Suki ni Shinayo" (好きにしなよ; lit. 'Do Whatever You Want') by Anly.

Immediately following the conclusion of the third season, a fourth and final season, subtitled Science Future, was announced. It ran for three split cours. The first 12-episode cours aired from January 9 to March 27, 2025. For the first cours, the opening theme is "Casanova Posse", performed by ALI, while the ending theme is "Rolling Stone", performed by Breimen. The second cours aired from July 10 to September 25, 2025. For the second cours, the opening theme is "Supernova", performed by Kana-Boon, while the ending theme is "No Man's World", performed by Otoha. The third and final cours aired from April 2 to June 25, 2026. For the third and final cours, the opening theme is "Skins" (スキンズ, Sukinzu), performed by Asian Kung-Fu Generation, while the ending theme is "Rocket", performed by Burnout Syndromes.

At the "Stone Fes. 2026" event in October 2026, a new sequel was announced. The sequel will adapt the "Terraforming" one-shot from the 27th manga volume, set after the main story.

The series is streamed by Crunchyroll worldwide outside of Asia, and Funimation produced a simuldub. Medialink holds the license to the series in Southeast Asia. The English dub of the anime began airing on Adult Swim's Toonami programming block on August 25, 2019. The second and third seasons premiered on Toonami respectively on May 16, 2021, and June 4, 2023.

=== Video game ===
In December 2020, a smartphone game based on the series, Dr. Stone: Battle Craft, was announced. The game was developed by Poppin Games Japan and is a strategy game with elements of open world games, role-playing games, and raising games. It was released on September 1, 2021.

== Reception ==
=== Manga ===
By April 2021, the manga had over 10 million copies in circulation; over 14 million copies in circulation by July 2022; over 15 million copies in circulation by December of that same year; over 18 million copies in circulation by December 2024; over 19 million copies in circulation by July 2025; and over 20 million copies in circulation by March 2026.

Dr. Stone won the 64th Shogakukan Manga Award for the shōnen category in 2019. The series placed second on the fourth Next Manga Awards in 2018. Dr. Stone ranked fifteenth, along with Keep Your Hands Off Eizouken!, on Takarajimasha's Kono Manga ga Sugoi! list of top manga of 2018 for male readers, and seventeenth, alongside Sweat and Soap and Heterogenia Linguistico, on the 2020 edition. Dr. Stone was one of the Jury Recommended Works in the Manga Division at the 21st Japan Media Arts Festival in 2018. The manga was nominated for the 54th Seiun Award in the Best Comic category in 2023.

On TV Asahi's Manga Sōsenkyo 2021 poll, in which 150,000 people voted for their top 100 manga series, Dr. Stone ranked 100th. Barnes & Noble listed Dr. Stone on their list of "Our Favorite Manga of 2018".

Before its anime series adaptation, Nicholas Dupree of Anime News Network included Dr. Stone on his list of "The Most Underrated Shonen Jump Manga". Dupree wrote that the series is "brimming with surprisingly accurate facts about chemistry and engineering", additionally commenting: "Tons of Jump manga can make impassioned speeches about the power of friendship or determination, but only Dr. Stone can do the same for the power of a light bulb".

=== Anime ===
In November 2019, Crunchyroll listed Dr. Stone in their "Top 25 best anime of the 2010s". IGN also listed Dr. Stone among the best anime series of the 2010s. Gadget Tsūshin listed Senku's catchphrase "This is exhilarating!" in their 2019 anime buzzwords list. Dr. Stone was the eighth most watched anime series on Netflix in Japan in 2019. In 2020, Senku won the "Best Protagonist" category at the 4th Crunchyroll Anime Awards. The second season was praised for its pacing and how it managed to conclude Senku and Tsukasa's rivalry. It has also been noted for being scientifically accurate. Kari Byron of Mythbusters praised much of the scientific accuracies presented in the show while also noting some of the liberties the creators took. She also commented that Senku's character shared many similarities to members of her own team.

The Encyclopedia of Science Fiction described Dr. Stone as an anime distinguished by its enthusiastic celebration of science and technology, pointing out how Senku frequently interrupts the narrative to explain scientific principles and the processes behind rebuilding civilization. It considered the scientific explanations generally sound despite occasional artistic liberties, while criticizing the implausibility of several characters' abilities and circumstances. The encyclopedia characterized Senku as frequently irritating but ultimately likeable, contrasting his politically indifferent enthusiasm for science with the charismatic and distinctly fascistic worldview of his rival, Tsukasa. It also identified the potential sociological implications of their competing visions of society as an intriguing aspect of the series.
