= Phototool =

Printed film used for manufacturing printed circuit boards

A phototool is a printed film used in the process of manufacturing a printed circuit board (PCB). The phototool is used as a mask to expose a photoresist material.

Traditionally, phototools were made with silver halide film or diazo film, but in recent years, many suppliers have come out with films that do not fit into either of these categories. All dry-film phototools are printed using a similar process to film photograph.

The main alternative to using phototools is maskless lithography, more commonly referred to as direct imaging.

== References and further reading ==
- Chemistry of Photography By: Dr. Drew Myers, Chemistry Coordinator
- Mees, C.E.K, and James, T.H., The Theory of the Photographic Process, 3rd ed., The Macmillan Co., New York, 1966.
