= Nital =

Solution of nitric acid and alcohol

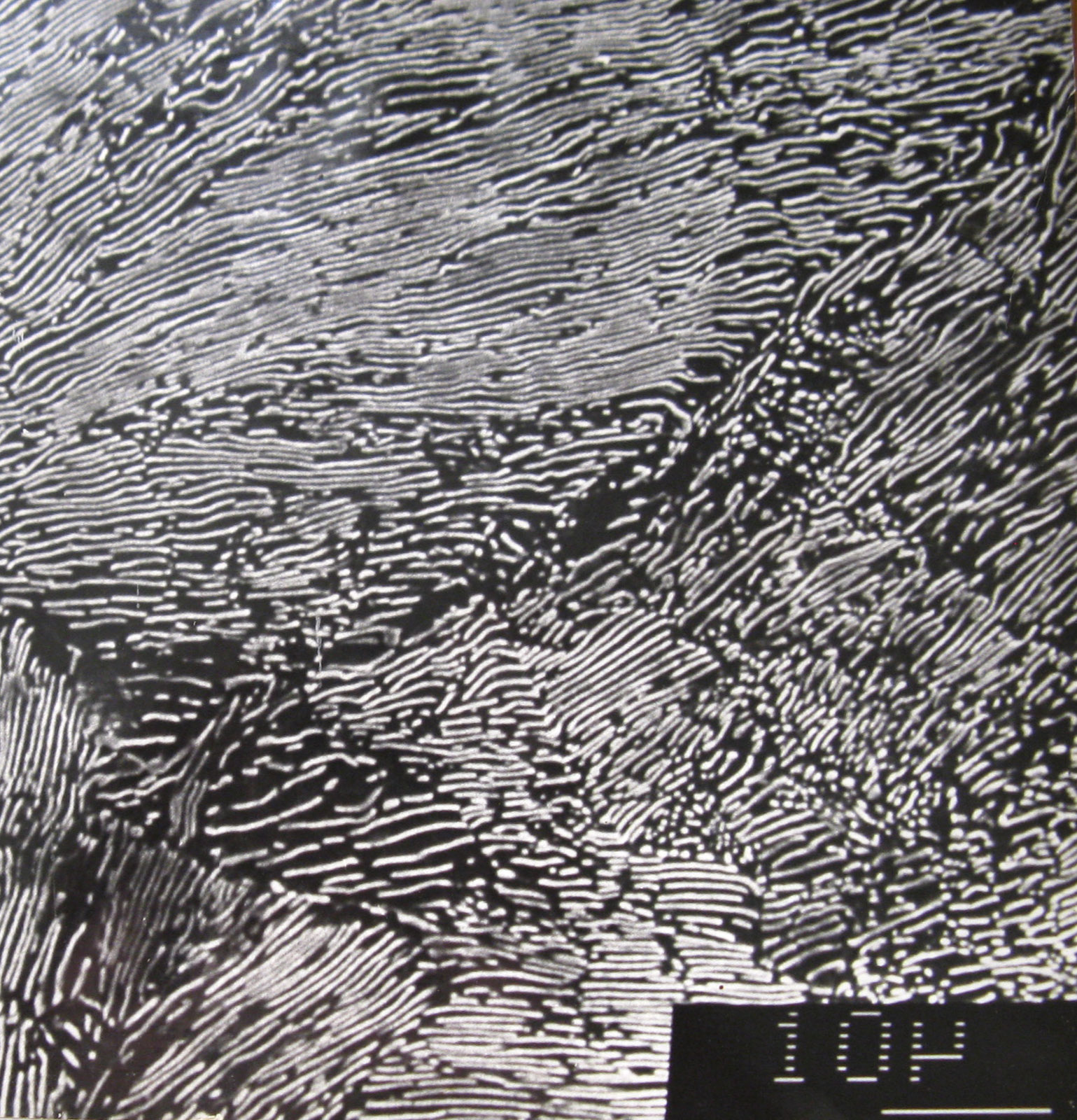
SEM micrograph of lamellar pearlite in a eutectoid (0.8% carbon) steel after annealing. Nital etch.

Nital is a solution of nitric acid and alcohol commonly used for etching of metals. It is especially suitable for revealing the microstructure of carbon steels. The alcohol can be methanol or ethanol.

Mixtures of ethanol and nitric acid are potentially explosive. This commonly occurs by gas evolution, although ethyl nitrate can also be formed. Methanol is not liable to explosion but it is toxic.

A solution of ethanol and nitric acid will become explosive if the concentration of nitric acid reaches over 10% (by weight). Solutions above 5% should not be stored in closed containers. Nitric acid will continue to act as an oxidant in dilute and cold conditions.

== In popular culture ==
Nital is a critical plot element in the Japanese manga series Dr. Stone, whose story revolves around the mysterious petrification of all mankind. Initially made from nitric acid that they produce from bat guano found in a cave, they then produce nitric acid by using the Ostwald process (using platinum as a catalyst and urine as an ingredient) and highly distilled alcohol with a ratio of 3:7. Nital is dubbed the revival fluid with the unique property of undoing the freezing of petrified people.

In The Simpsons S18, E20, a snake knocks over a flask of ethanol and a flask of nitric acid, creating fumes from which their dog saves Bart.
