= Electrostatic spray-assisted vapour deposition =

Electrostatic spray-assisted vapour deposition (ESAVD) is a technique (developed by a company called IMPT) to deposit both thin and thick layers of a coating onto various substrates. In simple terms chemical precursors are sprayed across an electrostatic field towards a heated substrate, the chemicals undergo a controlled chemical reaction and are deposited on the substrate as the required coating. Electrostatic spraying techniques were developed in the 1950s for the spraying of ionised particles on to charged or heated substrates.

ESAVD (branded by IMPT as Layatec) is used for many applications in many markets including:

- Thermal barrier coatings for jet engine turbine blades
- Various thin layers in the manufacture of flat panel displays and photovoltaic panels, CIGS and CZTS-based thin-film solar cells.
- Electronic components
- Biomedical coatings
- Glass coatings (such as self-cleaning)
- Corrosion protection coatings

The process has advantages over other techniques for layer deposition (plasma, electron-beam) in that it does not require the use of any vacuum, electron beam or plasma so reduces the manufacturing costs. It also uses less power and raw materials making it more environmentally friendly. Also the use of the electrostatic field means that the process can coat complex 3D parts easily.
