= Aces Go Places (film series) =

Hong Kong action film series

- Aces Go Places 1–5 film Blu-ray box set
- Traditional Chinese: 最佳拍檔
- Simplified Chinese: 最佳拍档
- Literal meaning: The Perfect Partners
Transcriptions
Standard Mandarin
- Hanyu Pinyin: Zuì jiā pāidǎng
Yue: Cantonese
- Jyutping: Zeoi^{3} gaai^{1} paak^{3}dong^{3}
- Directed by: Eric Tsang (1-2); Tsui Hark (3); Ringo Lam (4); Lau Kar-leung (5); Chin Ka-lok (5)
- Screenplay by: Raymond Wong (1-3, 6); Karl Maka (4); Chan Kwok-tse (5)
- Produced by: Karl Maka (1, 4-5); Dean Shek (1); Raymond Wong (2-3, 6)
- Starring: Sam Hui; Karl Maka
- Cinematography: Joe Chan Chun-kit (1, 3); Paul Yip (1); Manny Ho (1); Arthur Wong (1-2); Johnny Koo (2); Peter Ngor ((2); Abdul M. Rumjahn (2); Bill Chan (3); Sander Lee (4); Paul Chan (5); Joe Chan Kwong-hung (5); Hung Hin-shing (5); Herman Yau (6)
- Edited by: Tony Chow (1-4); Wong Ming-kong (4); Wong Ming-lam (5); Robert Choi (6)
- Music by: Teddy Robin (1-2, 5); Sam Hui (1-3); Ha On-chia (2); Noel Quinlan (3); Tang Siu-lam (3); Tony Lo (4); Richard Lo (5); Mak Chun Hung (6)
- Production companies: Cinema City & Films Co. (1-5); Hong Kong Action Stunt (1); Eastern Bright Motion Picture (6); Hoi Ming Company (6)
- Distributed by: Cinema City & Films Co. (1-5); Mandarin Films (6)
- Running time: 565 minutes
- Country: Hong Kong
- Language: Cantonese
- Box office: HK$136,393,124

Aces Go Places (Chinese: 最佳拍檔; lit. 'The Perfect Partners') also known as Mad Mission in the United States, is a series of Hong Kong action comedy films created by Raymond Wong. The films star Sam Hui as King Kong, a master thief and martial arts expert who is aided by his bumbling sidekick, Detective Albert "Baldy" Au, portrayed by Karl Maka.

The series began in 1982, with the first two films directed by Eric Tsang. Subsequent films were directed by Tsui Hark, Ringo Lam and Lau Kar-leung respectively. A sixth film, 97 Aces Go Places, was made in 1997 with a different cast.

Lucky Stars Go Places, a crossover with the Lucky Stars film series, was released in 1986.

== Titles in the series ==
- Aces Go Places (Mad Mission 1, 1982)
- Aces Go Places 2 (Mad Mission 2: Aces Go Places, 1983)
- Aces Go Places 3 (Mad Mission 3: Our Man From Bond Street, 1984)
- Aces Go Places IV (Mad Mission 4: You Never Die Twice, 1986)
- Lucky Stars Go Places (1986)
- Aces Go Places 5: The Terracotta Hit (Mad Mission 5, 1989)
- 97 Aces Go Places (1997)

== Cast and characters ==
Character	Film					
Character	1	2	3	4	5	6
King Kong	Sam Hui	Sam Hui	Sam Hui	Sam Hui	Sam Hui	
Albert "Baldy" Au	Karl Maka	Karl Maka	Karl Maka	Karl Maka	Karl Maka	
Nancy Ho	Sylvia Chang	Sylvia Chang	Sylvia Chang	Sylvia Chang		
Giglo Joe	Dean Shek					
Ding Dong	Carroll Gordon					
Uncle Wah	Cho Tat-wah	Cho Tat-wah	Cho Tat-wah	Cho Tat-wah	Cho Tat-wah	
Mad Max	Chan Sing					
Squealie	Hon Kwok-choi	Hon Kwok-choi				
Police officer	Fung King-man		Fung King-man			
Albert's 9th floor neighbor				Fung King-man		
Ballet Director	Tsui Hark					
F.B.I.		Tsui Hark				
Police officer			Tsui Hark			
Priest in taxi	Raymond Wong					
Reverend in wedding		Raymond Wong				
Senior Police Officer						Raymond Wong
Army officer	Lee Pang-fei					
Police officer			Lee Pang-fei			
White Gloves	Robert Houston	Glen Thompson			Brad Kerner	
Nurse	Yu Mo-lin					
Ambulance Driver	George Lam					
Bull		Yasuaki Kurata				
Bull's thug		Billy Lau				
Fattie		Eric Tsang				
Mr. Wu		Charlie Cho				
Mr. Cho			Charlie Cho			
Rickshaw		Sai Gwa-Pau	Sai Gwa-Pau			
Baldy Junior			Cyrus Wong	Cyrus Wong		
Puffer Fish			Ricky Hui			
Police chief			John Shum			
Train engineer			Lowell Lo			
Mr. James Bond			Jean Mersant			
Tom Collins			Peter Graves			
Agent 701			Naomi Otsubo			
Sally Bright				Sally Yeh		
Interpol Ice hockey coach				Shih Kien		
HK Police Ice hockey coach				Kwan Tak-hing		
Professor				Roy Chiao		
Brother Thief					Leslie Cheung	
Sister Thief					Nina Li Chi	
Chinese Rambo					Conan Lee	
Ellen					Ellen Chan	
Prisoner					Danny Lee	
Murderer King					Roy Cheung	
Woman at window					Maria Cordero	
God Mother						Maria Cordero
Thai horse rider					Lau Kar-wing	
Thai horse rider					Hung Yan-yan	
Ho Sik						Alan Tam
Ho Sik's father						Alan Tam
Drunk Gun						Tony Leung Chiu-wai
Mandy Ling						Christy Chung
Mandy Li						Donna Chu
Lui Yu-yeung						Francis Ng
Lung						Ben Lam
Yu-yeung's killer						Billy Chow
Yu-yeung's sidekick						Moses Chan
Ching Yue						Simon Lui
Mr. Chan						Dayo Wong
Driver admiring Sik's car						Chin Siu-ho
Fatty Fok						Vincent Kok
Fatty's man in black						Chin Ka-lok
Fatty's man in black						Dion Lam
Retarded man						Joey Leung
Police special force						Collin Chou
Police special force						Timmy Hung
