= Crocodile Hunter (film) =

1989 Hong Kong film by Wong Jing

- DVD cover

Chinese name
- Traditional Chinese: 專釣大鱷
- Simplified Chinese: 专钓大鳄
Transcriptions
Standard Mandarin
- Hanyu Pinyin: Zhuān Diào Dà È
Yue: Cantonese
- Jyutping: Zyun1 Diu3 Daai6 Ngok3
- Directed by: Wong Jing
- Screenplay by: Wong Jing
- Produced by: Wong Jing
- Starring: Andy Lau; Alex Man; Cheung Kwok-keung; Sandra Ng; Elvina Kong; Lung Fong
- Cinematography: Gigo Lee
- Edited by: Robert Choi
- Music by: Lowell Lo; Sherman Chow
- Production company: Win's Movie Production
- Distributed by: Win's Entertainment
- Release date: 5 October 1989
- Running time: 101 minutes
- Country: Hong Kong
- Language: Cantonese
- Box office: HK$10,880,861

Crocodile Hunter (專釣大鱷) is a 1989 Hong Kong action comedy film written and directed by Wong Jing, and starring Andy Lau as an ace police officer who teams up with his less than competent subordinate (Alex Man) to capture a group of wanted thieves with bounties on their heads.

== Plot ==
While on duty saving hostages in a movie theater, Special Duties Unit officer Happy Chiu is shot in the head by a criminal disguised as a hostage and is hospitalized for nine months. Despite having a bullet lodged in his head, Happy refuses to retire so he applies to transfer as a senior inspector of the Criminal Investigation Department (CID) to earn cash to pay for his mother's kidney transplant operation.

At this time, a group of thieves led by Prince have escaped from prison and the police have issued a bounty of HK$800,000 to have them captured, so Happy assigns his CID detective Bad Odor Chuen, a cowardly, incompetent, officer who was previously humiliated by Prince's underling, Shrimp, who forced Chuen to undress himself at gunpoint. Lam Tin-fu, elder son of Lam's Group CEO Lam Yuet-ting, is unhappy that his father appointing his younger brother to be his successor, so he hires Prince to stage a robber at Lam's Group to get his father and brother killed.

Happy and Chuen then trick Bitchy Ying, the imprisoned girlfriend of Stalled Engine Tak, who is the computer hacker in Prince's gang, into working with them by paying her fellow prisoners to threaten her. Happy is then informed by his superior, Superintendent Wai, that TV actress Lam Ka-sin is being stalked by another one of Prince's underlings, Convulsion, and rushes to her apartment with Chuen and narrowly saves her from being killed by Convulsion and bring her to the safe house where she gets into a fight with Ying as they were childhood rivals. When Prince sees Tak calling his mother asking the whereabouts of Ying, Tak reveals to Prince that Ying is held by Happy and Chuen at Kowloon Peak and pleads the Prince to save her, but he and his gang shoot up the safehouse and also shoots Ying (who was wearing a bullet vest given by Chuen) and lies to Tak that his girlfriend has died but still convinces Tak to work for him. Tak then requests a computer to practice his hacking skills and uses it to send a tip that Prince is robbing the Lam's Building Saturday at 7 PM to his computer at home, which is seen by his family along with Chuen and Ying, who were visiting his family for tips. Happy and Chuen then tail Lam Tin-fu, which irritates the latter, who then frames the two for assaulting him. Happy and Chuen are put under investigation and suspended from their duties, but Superintendent Wai purposely gives them their suspension letters without a start date to allow them to continue to work on the case.

On the night Lam Yuet-ting announces to pass down his position as CEO to his second son, Prince and his gang arrives and holds a number of rich guests hostage while demanding Lam to bring him to the antique vault in the company to obtain the priceless Along the River During the Qingming Festival painting inside. Chuen and Ying were tied up by Shrimp, who forced them to undress themselves, while Happy saves the hostages and keeps them safe locked inside the elevator. Prince then reveals to Lam Ting-yuet that Tin-fu colluded with him before killing the latter and Ting-yuet gives the password to the vault before being killed by Prince. Happy arrives in time and saves Lam's second son while Tak smashes the computer to the vault which triggers the alarm to the police and gets shot by Prince. Chuen and Ying manages to untie themselves and the latter finds Tak who opens the vault and take the priceless painting for themselves. Happy shoots the rest of Prince's gang and kills Convulsion in fight, while Chuen kills Shrimp after re-enacting their first encounter.

Prince pretends to be a hostage and escapes after knocking out an officer, but Happy catches up with him in the parking lot but is at a disadvantage when he drops his glasses. Fortunately, Tak and Ying arrive to help him and Happy kills Prince by throwing and impaling him with a pen belonging to his deceased journalist father. Chuen is then reunited with his estranged wife and daughter after witness his heroic acts on live news.

== Cast ==
- Andy Lau as Happy Chiu (趙快樂), former Special Duties Unit (SDU) officer who transfers to the Criminal Investigation Department (CID) as a senior inspector after getting shot in an operation, hoping to earn bounty money in order to pay for her mother to get a kidney transplant in the United States. He is brave, confident and physically talented, and is skilled at throwing chopsticks in a way similar to knife throwing.
- Alex Man as Sau Hau-chuen (仇厚全), nicknamed Bad Odor Chuen (臭口全), an incompetent and cowardly CID detective who is assigned by Happy to be his assistant and partner.
- Cheung Kwok-keung as Stalled Engine Tak (死火德), an expert computer hacker with knowledge in opening FV-28 safes who is forced by Prince to work for him.
- Sandra Ng as Bitchy Ying (倀雞英), Tak's loud-mouthed, cocky girlfriend who was tricked by Happy and Chuen to work with them and briefly has relationship with the latter during the process.
- Elvina Kong as Lam Ka-sin (藍嘉倩), an attention-seeking TV star and Ying's childhood rival who is stalked by Convulsion.
- Lung Fong as Prince (公子), the slimy, manipulative and ruthless leader of the gang of thieves who would give his underlings once their worth is gone.
- Lau Kong as Superintendent Wai (韋Sir), Happy's superior officer and close friend.
- Rosamund Kwan as Chuen's estranged wife who left him with their daughter due to his cowardice and incompetence. (cameo)
- Frankie Chan as Convulsion (抽筋), Prince's underling who is sex maniac and stalks Ka-sin.
- Shing Fui-On as Officer Kong (江Sir), an SDU team captain who is jealous of Happy's confidence.
- Soh Hang-suen as Happy mother who suffers from kidney problems.
- Stephen Chan as Lee Pang (李鵬), Prince's underling who is hot-headed and abrasive.
- Kan Tat-wah as Portuguese (西洋仔), Prince's underling who was killed by his boss after he was shot by Happy in a gunfight.
- Ricky Wong as Lam Tin-fu (林天富), Lam Yuet-ting's elder son who is unhappy that his father is passing his position as CEO to his younger brother and hires Prince to kill the two.
- Ma Kai
- Foo Wang-tat as Lam Yuet-ting (林月亭), CEO of Lam's Group (林氏集團) who appoints his second son as his successor.
- Sherman Wong as a police officer.
- Jimmy Wong as Lam Yuet-ting's second son who is appointed by his father as his successor to his company.
- Charlie Cho as Chu Lei-ngan (朱利銀), a barrister who courts Ka-sin and was killed by Convulsion.
- Chan King as Lee Pang
- Eddie Maher as Shrimp (鹹蝦), Prince's underling who likes to force his victims to undress themselves.
- Liu Fan as prisoner paid by Happy to threaten Ying.
- Ronald Wong as Fink Fai (二五輝), Chuen's informant.
- Maria Cordero as Lam Ka-sin's assistant.
- Tang Tai-wo as one of rich party guests at Lam's Group.
- Cheung Kwok-wah as one of Tak's relatives.
- Yeung Jing-jing as one of Tak's relatives.
- Lam Kai-wing as The Red (赤軍), Prince's underling.
- Cynthia Khan (cut scene)
- Cheng Ka-sang as one of tak's relatives.
- Fan Chin-hung as a gangster.
- Derek Kok as one of rich party guests at Lam's Group.

== Reception ==
The film is described as a "typical Wong Jin concoction" containing "some really rather silly humor".

“Andy Lau and Alex Man make an entertaining cop team, and the action sequences are as exciting as you'd expect from an early-nineties Hong Kong film. It's Lethal Weapon-style excitement in Crocodile Hunter!” commented YesAsia.
