= Hong Kong Godfather =

Hong Kong Godfather may refer to:

- Hong Kong Godfather (1991 film), a Hong Kong action film
- Hong Kong Godfather (1985 film), a Hong Kong action film
