= Aces Go Places 3 =

1984 Hong Kong film by Tsui Hark

- Film poster
- Traditional Chinese: 最佳拍檔之女皇密令
- Simplified Chinese: 最佳拍档之女皇密令
- Literal meaning: The Perfect Partners: The Queen's Secret Order
Transcriptions
Standard Mandarin
- Hanyu Pinyin: Zuì jiā pāidàng zhī nǚhuáng mìlìng
Yue: Cantonese
- Jyutping: Zeoi^{3} gaai^{1} paak^{3}dong^{3} zi^{1} neoi^{5}wong^{4} mat^{6}ling^{6}
- Directed by: Tsui Hark
- Written by: Raymond Wong
- Produced by: Raymond Wong
- Starring: Sam Hui; Karl Maka; Sylvia Chang; Ricky Hui; John Shum
- Cinematography: Bill Wong; Joe Chan
- Edited by: Tony Chow
- Music by: Noel Quinlan; Tang Siu-lam
- Production company: Cinema City & Films Co.
- Distributed by: Golden Princess Amusement
- Release date: 26 January 1984 (HK)
- Running time: 94 minutes
- Country: Hong Kong
- Language: Cantonese
- Box office: HK$29,286,077

Aces Go Places 3 (Chinese: 最佳拍檔之女皇密令; lit. 'The Perfect Partners: The Queen's Secret Order', also known under the titles Aces Go Places 3 - Our Man from Bond Street and Mad Mission III) is a 1984 Hong Kong action comedy film and the third installment in the Aces Go Places film series. It is directed by Tsui Hark, written and produced by Raymond Wong, and stars Sam and Ricky Hui, Karl Maka, Sylvia Chang, John Shum, and Peter Graves.

Aces Go Places 3 was the highest-grossing film in Hong Kong on its release in 1984 and was the highest-grossing film in the series. The film was released in an English-language dub titled Mad Mission 3 which had scenes cut and altered from the original film.

== Plot ==
The film starts in Paris, where King Kong is recruited by Elizabeth II and a James Bond-esque character to retrieve one of the Crown Jewels which has been stolen and is located in a Hong Kong Police Headquarters vault. Richard Kiel spoofs his role as "Jaws" from the James Bond film series.

== Cast ==
- Sam Hui as King Kong
- Karl Maka as Albert Au
- Sylvia Chang as Nancy Ho
- Cyrus Wong as Baldy Junior
- Ricky Hui as Puffer Fish
- Peter Graves as Tom Collins
- John Shum as Police Chief
- Jean Mersant as Mr. Bond
- Richard Kiel as Big G
- Tsuneharu Sugiyama as Oddjob
- Charlie Cho as Tso
- Walter Tso as Uncle Hua
- Naomi Otsubo as Agent 701
- Lowell Lo as Train engineer
- Ken Boyle as CIA chief
- Diego Swing as Sheikh Abbas
- Huguette Funfrock as Queen of England
- Jay Koch as Ronald Reagan
- Toby Russell as Father Christmas
- Tsui Hark and Fung Ging-man as police officer

== Production ==
Aces Go Places 3 riffs off the plots of the James Bond series and features cameos from actors in various English-language spy features. These include Peter Graves from the Mission: Impossible television series and Richard Kiel who played Jaws in The Spy Who Loved Me and Moonraker. The film also features a character resembling Oddjob. Several sources erroneously report that the character of "Mr Bond", the James Bond-like British secret agent, was played by Neil Connery, Sean Connery's younger brother. The character was actually played by Jean Mersant, a French Sean Connery impersonator.

== Release ==
Aces Go Places 3 was released on 26 January 1984. The film was a success with audiences, becoming the highest-grossing film in Hong Kong in the year end box office and was the highest-grossing film in the Aces Go Places series.

=== Mad Mission version ===
An English-dubbed version of the film was released under the title Mad Mission 3. This version removes about 20 minutes of footage including scenes from the original film with Karl Maka's Albert, the baby and a maid and scenes with Sylvia Chang's character, Ho, in the hospital. This version includes additional comedy scenes with Peter Graves' character.

== Reception ==
Allmovie gave the film three stars out of five, noting that the plot for Aces Go Places 3 was "stronger than usual for the series" and "that film's juvenile sense of humor might put off viewers in search of more sophisticated fare, but many others are likely to find the movie too colorful and exciting to be denied." John Charles, author Hong Kong Filmography 1977-1997 awarded the film a six out of ten rating finding the scenes involving Sylvia Chang and Karl Maka were "tiresome and consist almost exclusively of situations from old sitcoms". In his book Horror and Science Fiction Film IV, Donald C Willis referred to the film as a "lively, routine action comedy."

== See also ==
- Aces Go Places (film series)

== Bibliography ==
- Morton, Lisa (2009). The Cinema of Tsui Hark. McFarland. ISBN 9780786444601.
- Charles, John (2000). The Hong Kong Filmography, 1977-1997. McFarland. ISBN 0786408421.
- Willis, Donald C. (1997). Horror and Science Fiction Films IV. Scarecrow Press. ISBN 0810830558.
