= The Fortune Code =

1990 Hong Kong film by Kent Cheng

- DVD cover
- Directed by: Kent Cheng
- Written by: Barry Wong; Wong Jing
- Produced by: Kent Cheng; Wallace Cheung
- Starring: Andy Lau; Sammo Hung; Anita Mui; Alan Tam; Max Mok; Michael Miu; Austin Wai; Eric Tsang; Frankie Chan; Gordon Liu
- Cinematography: Derek Wan; Gigo Lee; Ma Koon-wa
- Edited by: Wong Ming-lam
- Music by: Richard Lo
- Production company: Movie Impact
- Distributed by: Newport Entertainment
- Release date: 19 January 1990
- Running time: 89 minutes
- Country: Hong Kong
- Language: Cantonese
- Box office: HK$17,527,234

The Fortune Code (Chinese: 富貴兵團) is a 1990 Hong Kong action film directed by Kent Cheng and starring Andy Lau, Sammo Hung, Anita Mui, Alan Tam, Max Mok, Michael Miu, Austin Wai, Eric Tsang, Frankie Chan, and Gordon Liu.

== Plot ==
Set during the Japanese occupation of China, The Fortune Code tells the story of the occupants of a POW camp. When Wah Ying-hung (Andy Lau) manages to escape from the camp to meet up with his sweetheart, he learns that she is a spy. After being enrolled in the secret service he is sent back into the camp on a secret mission.

His mission is to get the code to a Swiss bank account which will release funds to save China; the only person who knows the code is known as the God of Fortune and is held captive in the camp.

== Cast ==
- Andy Lau as Wah Ying-hung
- Sammo Hung as Brother Hung
- Anita Mui as Jone
- Alan Tam as Robin
- Max Mok as Little Candy
- Michael Miu as Little Robot
- Wilson Lam as Red Horse
- Ben Lam as Little Dragon Fly
- Austin Wai as Little Tortoise
- Eric Tsang as Runaway
- Kent Cheng as Chocolate
- Frankie Chan as White Commander
- Charlie Cho as Peter
- Chung Fat as Japanese Soldier
- Billy Lau as Donald Duck
- Ken Lo as Japanese Soldier
- Eddie Chan as Japanese Soldier
- Ridley Tsui as Japanese Officer
- Charine Chan as Nurse
- Jaime Chik as Nurse
- Joan Tong as Nurse
- Sharon Kwok as Nurse
- Jason Pai as Green Commander
- Kirk Wong as Paul
- Gordon Liu as Blue Commander
- Blackie Ko as Hideki Saijo
- Chen Kuan-tai as Triad boss gambler
- Shing Fui-On as Prisoner
- Natalis Chan as Dragon
- Lung Fong as Japanese Camp Commander Chai
- Stephen Chan as Asst. Camp Commander Kent
- Jassie Lam as Gamble Audience
- Bruce Mang as A Cell's muscle POW
