= Gangs '92 =

1992 Hong Kong film by Dick Cho

- Film poster
- Traditional Chinese: 童黨之街頭霸王
- Simplified Chinese: 童党之街头霸王
- Hanyu Pinyin: Tóng Dǎng Zhī Jiē Tóu Bà Wáng
- Jyutping: Tung4 Dong2 Zi1 Gaai1 Tau4 Baa3 Wong4
- Directed by: Dick Cho
- Screenplay by: Law Kam-fai; Lee Man-choi
- Produced by: Jimmy Law; Benny Chan
- Starring: Aaron Kwok; Winnie Lau
- Cinematography: Gary Ho
- Edited by: Robert Choi
- Music by: Tang Siu-lam
- Production company: Suen Woo Film Productions
- Distributed by: Newport Entertainment
- Release date: 7 March 1992
- Running time: 93 minutes
- Country: Hong Kong
- Language: Cantonese
- Box office: HK$6,669,607

Gangs '92 is a 1992 Hong Kong action film directed by Dick Cho and starring Aaron Kwok as a rich heir who befriends a group of junior delinquents and helps them turn their lives around go straight. The film was released on 7 March 1992 by Newport Entertainment, however, Golden Sun Films Distribution currently owns the film's worldwide distribution rights.

== Plot ==
Lone (Leung Sap-yat), Tung (Ricky Ho), Pig Kidney (Tse Wai-kit) and May (Winnie Lau) are a group of delinquents from Kam Tin, New Territories. Lone, Tung and Pig Kidney spend their days in a gambling den in their village while May works at her father's bar where she cons patrons in poker. One day, they con a cellphone from an insurance agent from a parking lot. Later that night, they hang out in an arcade where May plays Street Fighter with Sam (Aaron Kwok), who is a rich heir. Pig Kidney notices Sam's LV wallet and Lone pickpockets it from Sam. As the gang leave the arcade, they are stopped outside by two police officers who search them and find the wallet and arrest them. Sam notices his wallet stolen and catches Tung, who was still inside the arcade, and makes it outside where they also follow the rest to the police station. At the police station, Sam gives his statement while the gang encounters Fat Mum (Maria Cordero), a police officer who they are acquainted with, scolds them for their actions. Fat Mum pleads with her superior to let the kids go and upon seeing this, Sam claims the kids helped him find his wallet in his statement.

The gangs treat Sam to dinner to apologise and thank him. At the restaurant, they encounter the insurance agent whose cellphone they conned. Sam helps them settle the problem by giving HK$20,000 to the insurance agent, who lets the kids go free and Lone promises to pay back the money to Sam the next day. In order to obtain the sum, Tung asks his grandaunt to loan money in her store in Kam Tin. She cries and claims the kids are extorting her for protection fees and the fellow villagers kick them out.

Meanwhile, Sam is getting ready to study abroad in Los Angeles. The kids, who are unable to get money to pay back to Sam, is curious of Sam's identity due to his wealth. May then devises a scheme to the group to con some money from Sam. The next day, they meet Sam at the arcade before they proceed to hang out in a karaoke. In the karaoke, a negotiation between Fu Tin-hang (Karel Yeung) and s rival triad leader Fu Tin-hang (Karel Wong) where Fu stabs his rival to death and triggers a big fight. During the fight, Pig Kidney notices police officer Fong (Lung Fong) letting Fu leave before arresting everyone on the kar oke including the kids. At the police station, Pig Kidney tells Fat Mum what he saw. The kids are later freed with the help of Sam's lawyers.

The next day, Sam hangs out with the kids in a barbeque in Kam Tin where they tell him they his wealth but Sam is grateful to have friends like them. He also tells them of his plan to study biochemistry in the United States, which they laugh off since they believe he belongs to a powerful triad family while Lone tells him he wants Sam to help them start a casino, but Sam suggests him to start a legal business instead.

Later, Sam devises a prank to trick the kids into believing they were trafficking cocaine for him. May plays along with Sam and the three were horrified until they found out the truth. Afterwards, Sam gifts some clothes to the kids as souvenirs at his mansion before he goes to study abroad although Lone refuses and is upset at Sam's prank. Pig Kidney also steals two watches from Sam's mansion before leaving.

The kids mortgage one of the watches at a casino in Kam Tin where they win big. At the suggestion of fellow villagers Brother Nine (Wong Hung), the kids go to a bigger gambling den outside their village owned by triad leader Brother Kong (Lam Wai). The kids mortgage the same watch to Kong for a cash and while gambling, Kong's underling Fu takes over the casino for the rest of the day. After winning again, the kids ask Fu for the watch back. When Fu refuses to give it back, Pig Kidney sets a fire and takes May hostage, forcing the kids to pay him HK$500,000 in two hours for the damages they caused.

With nowhere else to go, they beg Sam for help. Sam then delivers HK$500,000 cash to Fu, who refuses to let May go until Kong arrives. When Kong scolds Fu for his behavior, Fu kills his boss. Fu then forces Officer Fong to frame Sam and the kids for the murder of Kong. Now that they are wanted criminals, the kids call Fat Mum out for help. During an attack by Fu and his henchman, Pig Kidney, Tung, Fat Mum and her subordinate, Little Wah (Chin Shih-erh) were killed.

Sam, Lone and May is bent on seeking revenge on Fu. Sam gives a call to Officer Fong and lures him into revealing where Fu is hiding. Sam, Lone and May arrive to Sha Tin where Sam crashes one of cars of Fu's henchmen down a mountain before fighting Fu and the rest of his henchman. Sam eventually graps hold of Fu where he forces Fu to confess his crimes to a tape. Fong then arrives with a shotgun and shoots Lone and Fu and killing the latter. He then attempts to kill Sam and May until Sam hangs Fong up high with a rope and drops him to his death.

== Cast ==
- Aaron Kwok as Sam Lam (藍靖)
- Winnie Lau as May / Crazy Chicken (癲雞)
- Karel Wong as Fu Tin-hang (傅天恆)
- Ricky Ho as Tung (阿東)
- Leung Sap-yat as Tang Lone (鄧龍) / Lantern (燈龍)
- Tse Wai-kit as Pig Kidney (豬肺)
- Maria Cordero as Fat Mum (肥媽)
- Lung Fong as Officer Fong (方Sir)
- Lam Wai as Brother Kong (剛哥)
- Chin Shih-erh as Little Wah (細華)
- Victor Hon as Uncle Ken (根叔)
- Kwai Chung as Gangster
- Ng Kwok-kin as Fat Mum's superior
- Lam Chung as Sam's father
- Chue Sing-choi as Sam's mother
- Chan Yiu-kwong
- James Ha as Fu's thug
- Nicky Li as Policeman
- Chan Tat-kwong as Fu's thug
- Wilson Yip as Policeman
- So Hing-nin
- Garry Chan as May's father
- Wong Hung as Brother Nine (九哥)
- Hau Woon-ling as Tung's grandaunt
- Fei Pak as Policeman
- Kent Chow as Waiter
- Wai Nai-yip as Thug
- Benny Lai
- Ko Shut-fung
- Hon Chun
- Chun Kwai-bo
- Yu Ngai-ho

== Reception ==
=== Critical reception ===
Gangs '92 earned a score of 5.6/10 stars on the Chinese media rating site, Douban.

=== Box office ===
The film grossed HK$6,669,607 at the Hong Kong box office during its theatrical run from 7 to 20 March 1992.

== See also ==
- Aaron Kwok filmography
