= Let's Have a Baby =

Let's Have a Baby may refer to:

- Let's Have a Baby, a film by Charlie Cho
- "Let's Have a Baby", an episode of the TV series Playing House, GLAAD Media Award for Outstanding Individual Episode
- "Let's Have a Baby", a song on the Prince album Emancipation
