= Lung Fong =

- Born: Li Chien-Min (李健民); 25 February 1954; Hong Kong
- Died: 14 November 2008 (aged 54); Xi'an, Shaanxi, China
- Occupations: Actor, film director, action choreographer
- Years active: 1971–2000

Chinese name
- Traditional Chinese: 龍方
- Simplified Chinese: 龙方
Transcriptions
Standard Mandarin
- Hanyu Pinyin: lóng fāng
Yue: Cantonese
- Jyutping: Lung4 Fong1
- Musical career
- Also known as: Jimmy Lung; Jimmy Lee; Lee Kin-Man; Li Chien-Min
- Genres: Cinema of Hong Kong

Jimmy Lung Fong (龍方) was a Hong Kong actor, film director, and action choreographer. Lung was best known to moviegoers for his frequent portrayal of villains in various Hong Kong films, most notably in films made by Wong Jing. Lung retired from the film industry, and died from lung cancer in 2008.

== Career ==
Lung Fong was born Li Chien-Min. He started his career by playing small roles in porno's and martial arts films during the 1970s. In 1981, he left his acting career, after starring in a series of unsuccessful films. In 1989, director Wong Jing needed someone to play a villain in Casino Raiders. While Wong had dinner at restaurant while Lung was the manager, he asked Lung for an audition. Playing the role turned out to be Lung's biggest career breakthrough, and he was nominated for a "Best New Performer" award at the Hong Kong Film Awards.

Lung left his restaurant job, and went on to play numerous other villains in the following decade. He retired from acting again in 2000 and moved to Mainland China to work as a businessman.

=== Death ===
Ming Pao Daily News quoted Lung's manager as saying he was diagnosed with terminal lung cancer in May 2008, after he saw a doctor about a persistent cough. Lung sought treatment at the Wuhan, Hubei province of China, but by the time he was admitted to hospital in the Xi'an, Shaanxi province, he could not speak and did not leave any last words before his death. Lung died from lung cancer at the age of 54 on 14 November 2008. A memorial service for the actor was held in Shenzhen.

== Filmography ==
=== Actor ===
- The Deadly Duo (1971)
- The Bloody Fists (1972)
- Rage of the Wind (1973)
- A Girl Called Tigress (1973)
- The Imprudent Iron Phoenix (1973)
- Seven to One (1973)
- The Two Cavaliers (1973)
- One by One (1973)
- The Young Dragons (1973)
- Gold Snatchers (1973)
- A Gathering of Heroes (1973)
- Black Panther (1973)
- Empress Dowager's Agate Vase (1974)
- Brother Two (1974)
- Fatal Strike (1974)
- The Rangers (1974)
- Four Real Friends (1974)
- Tiger Force (1975)
- Thou Shall Not Kill ... But Once (1975)
- Dragon Gate (1975) [uncredited]
- A Cookbook of Birth Control (1975)
- Bruce Lee's Deadly Kung Fu (1976)
- The Ming Patriots (1976)
- Master of the Flying Guillotine (1976)
- The Hot, the Cool and the Vicious (1976)
- Struggle with Death (1976)
- Savage Killers (1976)
- The Best of Shaolin Kung Fu (1976)
- Shaolin Death Squads (1977)
- The Greatest Plot (1977)
- Death Challenge (1977)
- Chinese Connection 2 (1977)
- Four Hands of Death (1977)
- Eagle's Claw (1977)
- Two Assassins of the Darkness (1977)
- Hero from Shanghai (1977)
- The Dragon, The Lizard and The Boxer (1977)
- Along Comes a Tiger (1977)
- The Shaolin Kids (1977)
- Iron Fists (1977)
- Fatal Needles vs. Fatal Fists (1978)
- Green Jade Statuette (1978)
- Challenge of Death (1978)
- Phantom Kung Fu (1978)
- Edge of Fury (1978)
- Shaolin Red Master (1978)
- Ten Brothers of Shaolin (1979)
- Big Boss of Shanghai (1979)
- Shaolin Invincible Sticks (1979)
- Scorching Sun, Fierce Winds, and Wild Fire (1979)
- Butcher Wing (1979)
- The Rebellious Reign (1980)
- Dangerous Person (1981)
- The Crazy Chase (1981)
- Crocodile Hunter (1989)
- Fatal Bet (1989)
- Casino Raiders (1989)
- God of Gamblers (1989)
- An Eye for an Eye (1990)
- Dragon in Jail (1990)
- The Big Score (1990)
- No Way Back (1990)
- The Fortune Code (1990)
- King of Gambler (1990)
- Three Great Kingdoms (1990)
- The Banquet (1991)
- Off Track (1991)
- God of Gamblers III: Back to Shanghai (1991)
- Lee Rock (1991)
- Lucky Dragon (1991)
- Angel Force (1991)
- Legend of the Dragon (1991)
- Hong Kong Godfather (1991)
- Secret Police (1992)
- Invincible (1992)
- Kickboxer's Tears (1992)
- Gangs '92 (1992)
- Heroes in Gail (1992)
- Her Judgement Day (1993)
- The Buddhist Spell (1993)
- Angel's Project (1993)
- Combat at Heaven's Gate (1993)
- The Sword Stained With Royal Blood (1993)
- Gambling Baron (1994)
- Hong Kong Adam's Family (1994)
- A Step to Heaven (1995)
- Touch of Evil (1995)
- The Vengeance (1995)
- How to Meet the Lucky Stars (1996)
- Storm Killer (1996)
- Fist of Mercy (1998)
- Gold Rush (1998)
- Leopard Hunting (1998)
- The Longest Nite (1998)
- Deadly Illusion (1998)
- Century of the Dragon (1999)
- The Golden Nightmare (1999)
- Delusion (1999)
- Painting with Human Skin (1999)
- Brother Forever (1999)
- Chinese Midnight Express II (2000)
- Fist Power (2000)
- Ghost Promise (2000)
- My Name is Nobody (2000)
- One Drop of Blood Per Step (2000)

=== Action director ===
- Gold Snatchers (1973)
- Death Challenge (1977)
- Challenge of Death (1978)
- Butcher Wing (1979)

=== Assistant action director ===
- The Hot, the Cool and the Vicious (1976)
- Fatal Needles vs. Fatal Fists (1978)
- Green Jade Statuette (1978)
- Phantom Kung Fu (1978)

=== Director ===
- Death Challenge (1977)

== Nominations ==
Year	Film	Nomination	Occasion
1990	Casino Raiders (1989)	Best New Performer	Hong Kong Film Awards
