= Aces Go Places 2 =

1983 Hong Kong film by Eric Tsang

- Hong Kong film poster
- Traditional Chinese: 最佳拍檔大顯神通
- Simplified Chinese: 最佳拍档大显神通
- Hanyu Pinyin: Zuì Jiā Pāi Dàng Dà Xiǎn Shén Tōng
- Jyutping: Zeoi3 Gaai1 Paak3 Dong3 Daa6 Hin2 San4 Tung1
- Directed by: Eric Tsang
- Written by: Raymond Wong
- Produced by: Raymond Wong
- Starring: Sam Hui; Karl Maka; Sylvia Chang
- Cinematography: Arthur Wong; Johnny Koo; Peter Ngor; Abdul M. Rumjahn
- Edited by: Tony Chow
- Music by: Teddy Robin; Sam Hui; Ha On-chia
- Distributed by: Cinema City & Films Co.
- Release date: 5 February 1983
- Running time: 100 minutes
- Country: Hong Kong
- Language: Cantonese
- Box office: HK$23,273,140

Aces Go Places 2 (Chinese: 最佳拍檔大顯神通) is a 1983 Hong Kong action-comedy film directed by Eric Tsang and starring Sam Hui, Karl Maka, Sylvia Chang. The film has also been dubbed into English and re-edited and was released overseas as Mad Mission II. The film is the second installment in the Aces Go Places film series. In the film, a burglar and a police detective join forces to locate stolen diamonds.

== Plot ==
A James Bond-type burglar King Kong (Sam Hui) and his friend Albert "Baldy" Au (Karl Maka), a bald police detective join forces to try to track down a rare set of stolen precious diamonds before it ends up in the hands of a notorious American mobster named "Black Gloves" (Filthy Harry in the dubbed version and during the English-speaking parts of the original film). The two unlikely duo are supervised by Baldy's wife, Supt. Nancy Ho (Sylvia Chang), a masculine, fiery-tempered policewoman as they are chased by many mafia members throughout the film in crazy chase sequences involving a number of car and motorbike stunts.

== Cast ==
- Sam Hui as King Kong
- Karl Maka as Albert Au
- Sylvia Chang as Supt. Nancy Ho
- Tsui Hark as Mental patient (special appearance)
- Eric Tsang as Fattie (special appearance)
- Raymond Wong as Priest (special appearance)
- Yasuaki Kurata as Bull
- Sue Wang as Juju
- Joe Dimmick as Black Gloves
- Hector Britt
- Charlie Cho as Wong
- Cho Tat-wah as Police Chief Uncle Wah
- Billy Lau as Gunman
- Suzanna Valentino
- Jamie Hales as Stunt man in bicycle stunt sequence
- Sai Gwa-Pau
- Douglas Airth as Stunt man in car on two wheels sequence

== Release ==
Aces Go Places was released in Hong Kong on 5 February 1983. The film was released in the Philippines by Valiant Films as Aces Strike to Win on 7 December 1988.

== Reception ==
Variety described the film as a "well calculated commercial movie" and a "never a dull moment fun film for kids and adults with young minds attuned to things that are basic and elementary." The review stated that Sam Hui "is beginning to be an adept comedian with good timing though he still mugs a lot."

== See also ==
- Aces Go Places (film series)
