= Grasshopper (band) =

Hong Kong band

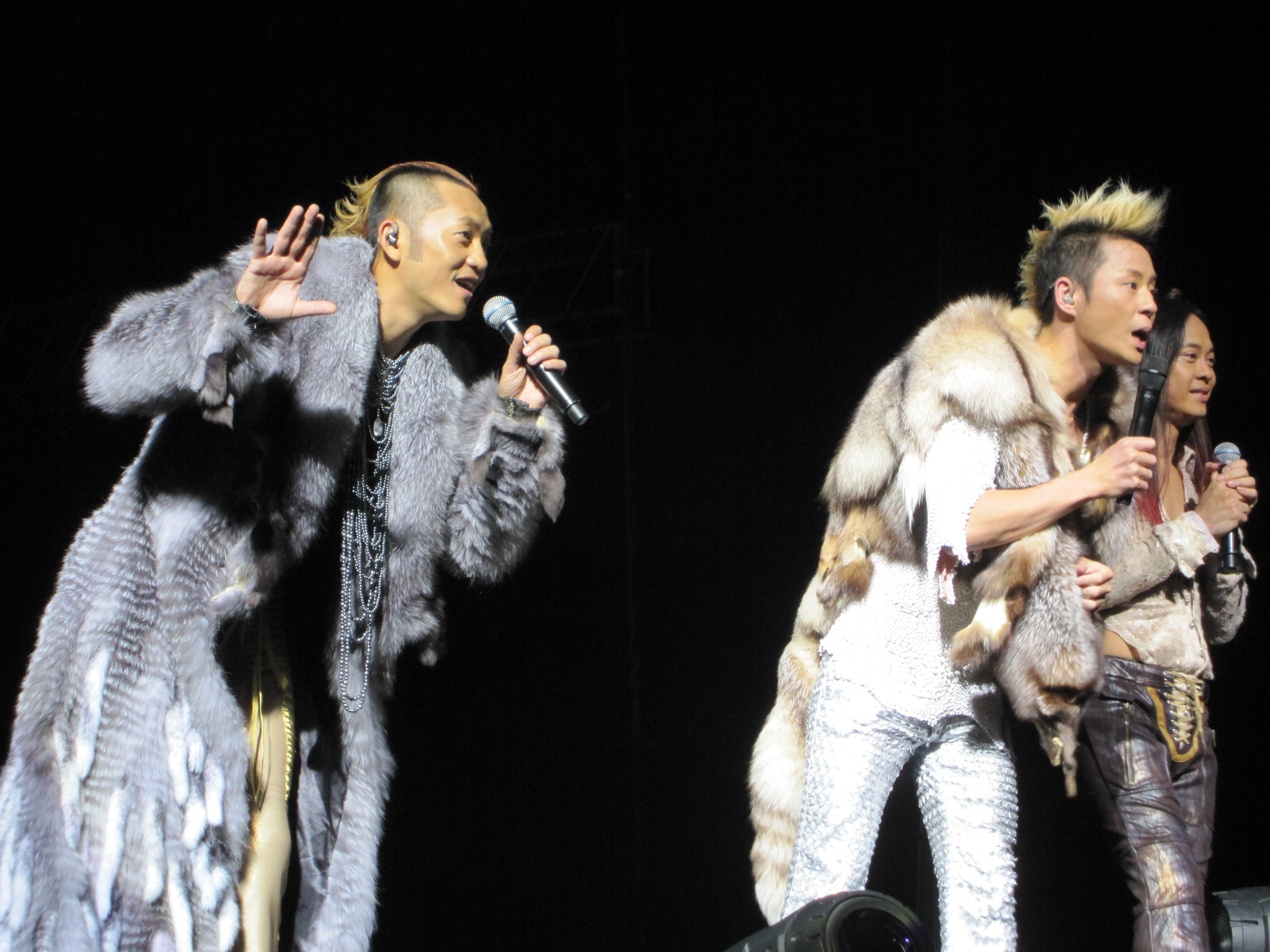
- Edmund So, Remus Choy, and Calvin Choy performing in 2009

Background information
- Origin: Hong Kong
- Genres: Cantopop; Mandopop
- Years active: 1985-present
- Label: Media Asia
- Members: Calvin Choy; Remus Choy; Edmond So

Chinese name
Transcriptions
Standard Mandarin
- Hanyu Pinyin: cǎo měng
Yue: Cantonese
- Jyutping: cou2 maang5

Grasshopper is a Hong Kong Cantopop male group formed in 1985. The band consists of Edmond So Chi-wai (Chinese: 蘇志威), Calvin Choy Yat-chi (Chinese: 蔡一智), and Remus Choy Yat-kit (Chinese: 蔡一傑).

On 28 October, 2026, the trio is officially recognized by Guinness World Record for " “Longest-Running C-Pop Group with No Line-up Changes” after performing together for 41 years and 112 days."

== Career ==
Calvin and Remus are brothers and grew up with neighbour Edmond in a poor neighbourhood in Hong Kong. It was Remus who was interested in dancing and singing at the beginning. His mother was his dancing teacher. In order to enter a talent competition, the 16-year-old Remus enlisted Calvin and Edmond as his back-up dancers. The act did not make it far in the competition but began to perform as a trio. They later named themselves Grasshopper inspired by their agility and favourite cocktail.

In 1985, the trio auditioned in the Hong Kong New Talent Singing Awards where Anita Mui was one of the judges. Before their turn to perform during the audition, the venue had a blackout. While waiting for candles to be lit to illuminate the venue, Anita chatted with the trio and were impressed with them. They would later reach the finals but failed to be placed in the top three. Mui subsequently invited them to be her backup dancers/singers.

The trio released their first album in February 1988 and continued to go on tour with Mui. In 2000, Edmond was approached by TVB to star in a series. This started a period where the Grasshopper members pursued their respective solo careers. Contrary to popular belief, the band was never dissolved.

They stopped singing and focused on acting for a few years, but returned to music in 2005 when they opened a few successful concerts. They are best known for their talent and physical features.

The band currently holds concerts all over the world including in Las Vegas.

Edmond So has two daughters, Yumi (born in 1999) and Ina (born in 2007), with his wife, former singer Winnie Lau Siu Wai. The pair met and began dating in the early 1990s before marrying in 1998. This angered some fans of Roger Kwok as Winnie was Roger's girlfriend at that time. Roger and Edmond starred in a TVB series together in 2003 called the Greed Mask. Calvin Choy has a daughter and a son, and also a stepdaughter Gigi from his wife's previous marriage, but his brother Remus is still single.

In 2020, Remus Choy created his own YouTube channel (傑少煮意RemusKitchen) that mainly focuses on his love for cooking and teaching recipes. His channel has been a huge success, renewing public interest in him not only as a singer, but also as a "chef". Then on 12 December 2021, Grasshopper launched their official YouTube channel called "GRASSHOPPER CHANNEL" focusing on just about everything such as their career, with some elements of a variety show - talk and having fun.

Grasshopper
Name	English	date of birth	Birthplace
蔡一智	Calvin Yat-Chi Choy	3 January 1965 (age 61)	Hong Kong
蘇志威	Edmond Chi-Wai So	3 May 1966 (age 60)	Hong Kong
蔡一傑	Remus Yat-Kit Choy	6 February 1967 (age 59)	Hong Kong

== Discography ==
=== Cantonese ===
1. Grasshopper I (26 February 1988)
2. Grasshopper II (烈火快車) (18 October 1988)
3. Grasshopper III (21 June 1989)
4. Grasshopper IV (1 March 1990)
5. Grasshopper The Best (7 September 1990)
6. Grasshopper (物質女郎) (20 December 1990)
7. Lonely EP (19 April 1991)
8. You Are Everything (18 July 1991)
9. 永遠愛著您 (23 January 1992)
10. Grasshopper 限時忘情- Remix (27 April 1992)
11. La La Means I Love You (13 August 1992)
12. 捨不得的感覺 (18 December 1992)
13. 世界會變得很美 (18 May 1993)
14. 與你在一起 (13 January 1994)
15. 音樂昆蟲 (17 October 1994)
16. 三人主義 (1995)
17. Present (1996)
18. 草蜢音樂店 (Grasshopper Shop) (1996)
19. 照常營業 (Now Open) (1997)

=== Mandarin ===
1. 限時專送 (1990)
2. 失戀陣線聯盟 (1990)
3. 讓妳哭紅了眼睛 (1991)
4. 忘情森巴舞 (1991)
5. 又愛又恨 (1992)
6. 寶貝,對不起 (1993)
7. 暗戀的代價 (1994)
8. 有緣來做伙 (1995)
9. 愛不怕 (1995)
10. Ba-ba-ba 不屬於 (1997)
11. Music Walker音悅行者 (2016)
