= Jimmy Heung =

Hong Kong film producer, director, and presenter (1950–2014)

Jimmy Heung Wah-sing
- Born: 1950
- Died: 20 November 2014 (aged 63–64)
- Occupations: Director; film producer; presenter

Chinese name
- Traditional Chinese: 向華勝
- Simplified Chinese: 向华勝
Transcriptions
Standard Mandarin
- Hanyu Pinyin: Xiàng Huáshèng
Yue: Cantonese
- Jyutping: heung3 wa4 sing3
- Musical career
- Also known as: Heung Wah-Sing; Xiang Huasheng; Heung Wa-Sing

Jimmy Heung Wah-sing (c. 1950 – 20 November 2014) was a Hong Kong film producer, director, and presenter. He was the younger brother of film producer/presenter Charles Heung.

== Career ==
Charles and Jimmy Heung were often hailed as two of Hong Kong's most successful presenters/producers, and one of the most controversial due to his family's triad background. Heung is widely suspected of ties to one of Hong Kong's largest and most powerful organized crime groups, the Sun Yee On triad. His father, Heung Chin, founded the Sun Yee On in 1919.

The two became partners in the formation of Win's Entertainment Ltd., however the partnership ended in 1992, as Charles felt that Jimmy's style of negotiating business too closely resembled that of a triad member. Following the partnership split between Charles and Jimmy, Win's Entertainment Ltd. later became a subsidiary for Charles's production company China Star Entertainment Group, which he formed in 1992.

== Films ==
Heung was the producer of films featuring some of Hong Kong's cinematic icons. These included films such as the Fight Back to School trilogy and the God of Gamblers series. The stars he highlighted as a presenter included Stephen Chow, Andy Lau, Chow Yun-fat, Rosamund Kwan, and Ng Man Tat. Jimmy made his directorial debut with the 1989 film Fatal Bet, followed a week later by another film based on the same true story, Casino Raiders, which he co-directed with Wong Jing, featuring his brother Charles in a supporting role. He also co-directed the sequel to Casino Raiders, No Risk, No Gain (1990), together with Taylor Wong.
