= Lung Fung Restaurant =

1990 Hong Kong film by Poon Man-kit

- Film poster
- Traditional Chinese: 龍鳳茶樓
- Simplified Chinese: 龙凤茶楼
- Hanyu Pinyin: Lóng Fèng Chá Lóu
- Jyutping: Lung4 Fung6 Cha4 Lau4
- Directed by: Poon Man-kit
- Written by: Hau Chi-keung; Clarence Yip
- Produced by: Clarence Yip
- Starring: Max Mok; Stephen Chow; Ellen Chan; Charine Chan
- Cinematography: Chan Ying-kit; Wong Po-man
- Edited by: Chan Kei-hop
- Music by: Lowell Lo
- Production company: Movie Impact Ltd
- Distributed by: Newport Entertainment Ltd
- Release date: 26 April 1990
- Running time: 88 minutes
- Country: Hong Kong
- Language: Cantonese
- Box office: HK$9,107,362

Lung Fung Restaurant is a 1990 Hong Kong action romantic comedy film directed by Poon Man-kit and starring Max Mok, Stephen Chow, Ellen Chan and Charine Chan.

== Plot ==
Dragon Ching (Max Mok) is a former triad member who was recently released from prison two weeks ago after a four-year stint and is working as a waiter at Lung Fung Restaurant. He reunites with his triad friend and sworn brother, Rubbish Pool (Stephen Chow), who believes Dragon is too good to work for someone else. When Pool's girlfriend, Apple (Strawberry Yeung) a club hostess, gets beat up by her colleagues, Gigi (Ellen Chan) and June (Charine Chan) when she tried to set up Gigi to have sex with a rich man, Brother Wai, Apple calls Pool to negotiate with Gigi and June. Pool is accompanied by Dragon in the negotiation and let Gigi and June go after they realized the situation while Dragon and Gigi have mutual attraction towards each other, but the latter is unwilling to admit.

Dragon encounters Gigi the next day while visiting his triad boss, Uncle Kent (Ng Man-tat), in the hospital with Pool and again at night while hanging out at the night club she works at. Dragon begins to actively pursue Gigi even to point of helping her mother with physical therapy, but Gigi purposely acts cold. One night, Brother Wai and a group of triad thugs try to kidnap her from the nightclub to retaliate for ditching him but Dragon arrives to in time to rescue her and she finally accepts him. However, the next night, Dragon was ambushed and attacked by triad members hired by Wai who turns out to be members of the same gang Dragon belongs to. Gigi finds out about this and realizes he has been avoiding her until one night when he shows up when she gets off work and they kiss passionately and begin dating. Eventually, they begin to plan their marriage.

Kent and Pool sets up a negotiation with rival triad boss Bull (Chu Tit-wo) sets a negotiation at Lung Fung Restaurant that does not go well and breaks into a brawl which Dragon, while on duty, steps in and saves Kent and holds Bull hostage with chopsticks on his throat. However, the main leader of their gang, Rocky (Parkman Wong) has business going with Bull and demands Dragon to apologise to Bull, who tricks Dragon to drink a bottle of pepper oil.

While having lunch with Gigi and June, Dragon and Pool bump into Bull and his underlings who insult them so Pool attacks them at the parking lot and was injured as a result. Dragon decides to strike back at Bull much to the dismay of Gigi, who worries about his safety, and they get into an argument. Dragon then sees Gigi kissed by a rich suitor and beats the suitor up before he discovers she rejected the suitor. Afterwards, Gigi leaves while leaving a note for Dragon saying she was greatly hurt while loving him. After reading the note, Dragon runs to win her back, but is stopped by Pool, who informs him a rival triad has ordered a hit on Kent and Dragon joins Pool to rescue Kent. In the ensuing triad brawl, Kent and Pool were killed while Dragon was arrested and imprisoned for six years. After Dragon is released from prison, he becomes a taxi driver and when he is about to go off work, Gigi boards his taxi. After talking to each other, it is revealed that Gigi is now a sale rep with a son while Dragon has a new girlfriend.

== Cast ==
- Max Mok as Dragon Ching (程一龍), a triad member and ex-con who works as a waiter at Lung Fung Restaurant (龍鳳茶樓).
- Stephen Chow as Rubbish Pool (垃圾馳), a second-tier triad leader and Ching's sworn brother who is foul-mouthed.
- Ellen Chan as Gigi (阿鳳), a club hostess who refuses to provide sexual services and was once hurt by a man he loved in the past.
- Charine Chan as June, Gigi's best friend and colleague who lives together with her.
- Ng Man-tat as Uncle Kent (堅叔), a triad leader who is Dragon and Pool's boss.
- Chu Tit-wo as Boss Bull (黑牛), a triad leader who is Kent's rival.
- Parkman Wong as Ricky, the main leader of the triad that Kent, Dragon and Pool belong to whom the trio is not find of
- Wong Chak-man as Simon, June's fiancé.
- Tam Sin-hung as Gigi's mother.
- Kwong Wai-keung
- Henry Fong as a rich man who wants to be Gigi's suitor.
- Chan King-cheung as Uncle Wong (黃伯), Dragon's boss who is the manager of Lung Fung Restaurant.
- Gilbert Lam as Johnny, June's ex-boyfriend.
- Ho Yee-ming
- David Lam
- Cheng Wai-keung
- Strawberry Yeung as Apple, Gigi's colleague who sets Gigi up to have sex with Brother Wai to earn money for herself.
- Jameson Lam as Brother Wai's drinking friend
- So Wai-nam as Pool's underling.
- Leung Sam as a triad elder.
- Hon San as a triad thug.
- Yeung Wan-king as a bar keeper.
- Chuk Kwai-po as a triad thug hired to attacks Dragon.
- Douglas Kung
- Ken Yip

== Music ==
=== Theme song ===
- Song: Love Without Fate (相愛沒緣份)
  - Singer: Andy Lau, Charine Chan
  - Composer: Lowell Lo
  - Lyricst: Calvin Poon
  - Arrange: Andrew Tuason
- Song: The End of Fate (緣盡)/ If You’re My Legend (如果你是我的傳說)
  - Singer: Andy Lau
  - Composer: Lowell Lo
  - Lyricst: Calvin Poon
  - Arrange: Andrew Tuason

=== Insert theme ===
- Song: Building True Love During Tribulation (患難建真情)
  - Singer: Shirley Kwan
  - Composer/Lyricist: Terence Choi
  - Arranger: Antonio Arevalo Jr.
