= 97 Aces Go Places =

1997 Hong Kong film by Chin Kar-lok

- Film poster
- Traditional Chinese: 最佳拍檔之醉街拍檔
- Simplified Chinese: 最佳拍挡之醉街拍挡
- Hanyu Pinyin: Zuì Jiā Pāi Dàng Zhī Zuì Jiē Pāi Dàng
- Jyutping: Zeoi3 Gaai1 Paak3 Dong3 Zi1 Zeoi3 Gaai1 Paak3 Dong3
- Directed by: Chin Kar-lok
- Screenplay by: Raymond Wong
- Produced by: Raymond Wong
- Starring: Alan Tam; Tony Leung; Christy Chung; Donna Chu; Francis Ng
- Cinematography: Herman Yau
- Edited by: Robert Choi
- Music by: Mak Chun Hung
- Production companies: Eastern Bright Motion Picture; Hoi Ming Films
- Distributed by: Mandarin Films
- Release date: 21 June 1997
- Running time: 92 minutes
- Country: Hong Kong
- Language: Cantonese
- Box office: HK$10,745,180

97 Aces Go Places is a 1997 Hong Kong action comedy film directed by Chin Kar-lok and starring Alan Tam, Tony Leung, Christy Chung, Donna Chu and Francis Ng. The film is the sixth and final installment of the Aces Go Places film series and features a different cast and storyline. It is the first film in the series to not feature Samuel Hui or Karl Maka as the main characters.

== Plot ==
Con artist Mandy Ling / Li Lai Shan cons a rich triad leader Lui Yu Yeung out of his money and gives it to a convalescent center where her mentally disturbed sister Mandy Li is staying. Earlier, she had also conned another triad leader out of a large sum of money in a poker game causing him to die from a heart attack. The triad leader states in his will that his son Ho Sik must avenge him by killing her with a gun. Ho Sik, who has no interest in guns and violence, hires Chui Cheong, the "Drunken Gun", an ace gunman to tutor him. However, Ho later finds himself falling in love with Mandy and is reluctant to kill her.

== Cast ==
- Alan Tam as Ho Sik / Ho Sik's father
- Tony Leung Chiu-Wai as Chu Cheong, the Drunken Gun
- Christy Chung as Mandy Ling / Li Lai Shan
- Donna Chu as Mandy Li
- Francis Ng as Lui Yu Yeung
- Simon Lui as Chung Yue
- Maria Cordero as God Mother
- Ben Lam as Lung
- Moses Chan as Yeung's sidekick
- Billy Chow as Yeung's killer
- Raymond Wong as Senior Police Officer
- Dayo Wong as Mr. Chan
- Bennett Pang as Pastor
- Emily Kwan as Yue's driving instructor
- Lam Chiu Wing as musician
- Chin Siu-ho as driver admiring Sik's car
- Karen Tong as woman in the street
- Joey Leung as retarded man
- Vincent Kok as Fatty Fook
- Collin Chou as police special force
- Timmy Hung as police special force
- Mok Ka Yiu as police special force
- Carlo Ng as police special force
- See Mei Yee as Yeung's art appraiser
- Johnny Wong as musician
- Mang Hoi as lieutenant of Sik's Group
- Ka Lee as lieutenant of Sik's Group
- Lee Chi Kit as lieutenant of Sik's Group
- Ma Koo as tea lady at poker game
- Kuk Hin Chiu
- Dion Lam as Fatty's man in black
- Chin Kar-lok as Fatty's man in black
- Peter Chan as lieutenant of Sik's Group
- Yee Tin Hung as Fatty's man in black
- Tang Chiu Yau as Fatty's man in black
- Rocky Lai as Yeung's killer
- Chan Siu Lung
- Nelson Cheung as man in the street
- Chu Cho Kuen as Yeung's thug
- Jack Wong as Yeung's thug
- Mak Wai Cheung as Yeung's thug
- Cheung Bing Chuen as Fatty's man in black

== Box office ==
The film grossed HK$10,745,180 at the Hong Kong box office during its theatrical run 21 June to 9 July 1997 in Hong Kong.

== See also ==
- Aces Go Places (film series)
