= Off Track =

1991 Hong Kong film by Jacky Cheung

- DVD cover
- Traditional Chinese: 馬路英雄
- Simplified Chinese: 马路英雄
- Hanyu Pinyin: Mǎ Lù Yīng Xióng
- Jyutping: Maa2 Lou4 Jing1 Hung4
- Directed by: Cha Chuen-yee
- Screenplay by: Rico Chung
- Produced by: Willie Chan; Benny Chan
- Starring: Jacky Cheung; Max Mok; Rachel Lee; Ellen Chan
- Cinematography: Ma Koon-wa
- Edited by: Cheung Kwok-kuen
- Music by: Lowell Lo
- Production company: Rich Film
- Distributed by: Newport Entertainment
- Release date: 19 January 1991
- Running time: 90 minutes
- Country: Hong Kong
- Language: Cantonese
- Box office: HK$5,038,551

Off Track is a 1991 Hong Kong action drama film directed by Cha Chuen-yee and starring Jacky Cheung, Max Mok, Rachel Lee and Ellen Chan. The film was followed by a sequel in 1995, titled Highway Man, which featured a different storyline.

== Plot ==
Lui (Jacky Cheung), a street racer and triad member, who owns an auto shop while also smuggling cocaine for his boss, Brother Bing (Lung Fong). Because of his life, he has been neglecting his girlfriend, Katy (Ellen Chan) and would let out his frustrations on her. An acquainted police officer Bad Breath (Billy Ching) informs Lui a rival named Chang-pau bets HK$40,000 against Lui in a race on Princess Margaret Road against one his racers Joe (Max Mok), who also owns an auto repair shop. Lui borrows HK$20,000 from Bad Breath. On the night of their duel, Lui and Joe taunt each other before proceeding to race, where Lui leads until near the end when Joe catches up and Lui rams Joe. The winner was undermined as a result and fight between Lui's and Chang-pau underlings breaks out until the police arrive and arrest Joe, Lui, and his younger sister, Ann (Rachel Lee) who fail to flee from the scene. At the police station, Lui's estranged father (Wu Ma), who is a seasoned officer, snacks and scolds Lui for his illegal activities and getting his sister involved. As his father detains him, Lui rants about how his father is a hypocrite for being a corrupt policeman before the establishment of the ICAC and blames his father as the cause of him becoming a criminal.

After being released from the police station, Lui's underling Bull (Karel Wong) reveals to him that Bad Breath attacked them and crashed into their shop for his debt while his henchmen also attacked Ann but was saved by Joe, who is pursuing her romantically. Lui retaliates by blowing up Bad Breath's car and fights his henchmen before the police arrive.

The next day Brother Bing tells Lui to settle things with Bad Breath and that he will pay for the car blown up by Lui but Lui would have to give Joe to Bad Breath for beating up his henchmen while saving Ann. Lui is reluctant to do so since Joe saved his sister but complies. Bull and his henchmen beat up and capture Joe and allow him to be beaten by Bad Breath and his gang before Ann and Katy arrive and bring him back home. Ann takes care of his wounds after Katy leaves but berates him for being afraid of his brother. Joe then chases after her and they later make love. The next morning, Katy arrives and warns Ann that her brother may find out of her relationship with Joe. Right when Katy leaves, Lui arrives with Bull and his other underling, Fat Dog, and Lui slaps Katy when she gets into the way. Lui then matches into Joe's apartment and attacks Joe before Joe's colleagues and the police led by Lui's father arrive. Lui leaves after Joe refuses to press charges on Lui and Ann is upset at his brother for his actions. However, when her father scolds Lui, she also blames his father for often berating her brother and becoming what he is now. Katy also leaves Lui being tired of his cold treatment.

Meanwhile, Chang-pau meets up Lui in a restaurant to settle their previous score and turns into a heated argument before Joe arrives and proposes another race with Lui. Lui agrees to race for HK$500,000 and warns Joe not to touch his sister. Lui's father then arrives and scolds him to quit his lifestyle as his girlfriend and sister are both unhappy with him and criminal record is very messy.

The next day while Lui was executing a drug deal for Brother Bing, his father notices him, resulting in a car chase where Lui's father eventually dies from a crash. With his dying words, his father asks Lui when will he grow up and own his mistakes. After reuniting with his sister and girlfriend at his father's funeral, he tells Brother Bing he wants to quit the triads but Bing dissuades him. Joe also meets up with Ann and express his love for her, but Ann says she worries her brother will kill him but Joe kisses her and tells her be will stop racing for good after his race with Lui.

Later, Ann tells his brother that Katy is leaving for Canada soon and Lui goes to find her. On the way, he gets challenged by a couple youngsters to a race where the youngsters crash their car before he brings Katy to talk with Brother Bing again that he wants to leave the triads for good. Lui and Katy finally reconcile but Lui insists to race with Joe as a way to end all conflicts. Lui also tells Bull and Fat Dog of his decision to quit and that they have the reward money if he wins the race. Lui and Joe then meet up and race, followed by Lui's underlings and Joe's colleagues in each of their respective cars. Near the end of the race, Bull rams into Joe's car, which results in Joe hitting Lui's car into the sea.

Joe, terrified that he killed Lui, tells Ann what happened and Ann is upset at him until he leaves to turn himself in but she stops him and pleads him not to turn himself in. Katy arrives at Ann's home and Joe sneaks out through the window. Bull arrives afterwards and orders a gun on the phone to kill Joe and seek revenge for Lui. Katy then arrives at Joe's shop to warn him but his colleague do not trust her and abuse her until Joe arrives to stop them. Katy then returns to Ann's home where Bull is, finds out about their plan and is enraged. At this moment, Joe arrives and Bull chases him down with a gun down the parking lot but Joe manages to knock his gun down and fight him. During this critical moment, Lui, who survived to crash, arrives to stop Bull but is too late when Bull manages to pick up his gun and shoots Joe, who dies in Ann's arms. Afterwards, Bull admits his greed for the HK$500,000 and is the cause of all this by ramming into Joe and Lui berates him for his impulsiveness. Bull then tries to make amends and lures the cops into a shootout, but Lui saves him in a car and drives out the parking lot when the police fire at them, eventually flipping the car.

== Cast ==
- Jacky Cheung as Lui
- Max Mok as Joe
- Rachel Lee as Ann
- Ellen Chan as Katy
- Karel Wong as Bull
- Wu Ma as Lui's father
- Lung Fong as Brother Bing
- Ma Kei
- Billy Ching
- James Ha
- Leung Sap-yat
- Hung Chi-ming
- Scott Kam
- Lam Chi-wa
- Ng Kwok-kin as Uncle Fei
- Chiu Jun-chiu as Policeman

== Theme song ==
- Street Hero (馬路英雄)
  - Composer: T. Clarkin, R. Bullard
  - Lyricist: Keith Chan Siu-kei
  - Singer: Jacky Cheung
- The Cold Hand (冰冷的手)
  - Composer: Huang Ta-chun
  - Lyricist: Jolland Chan
  - Singer: Jacky Cheung

== Reception ==
=== Critical ===
Love HK Film gave the film a mixed review and writes "Passably interesting triad/street racer drama which lifts clichés from many Hong Kong films before it."

=== Box office ===
The film grossed HK$5,038,551 at the Hong Kong box office during its theatrical run from 19 January to 2 February 1991.

== See also ==
- Jacky Cheung filmography
