= Aces Go Places IV =

1986 Hong Kong film by Ringo Lam

- Film poster

Chinese name
- Traditional Chinese: 最佳拍檔千里救差婆
- Simplified Chinese: 最佳拍档千里救差婆
Transcriptions
Standard Mandarin
- Hanyu Pinyin: Zuì Jiā Pāi Dàng Qiān Lǐ Jiù Chà Pó
Yue: Cantonese
- Jyutping: Zeoi3 Gaai1 Paak3 Dong3 Cin1 Lei5 Gau3 Caai1 Po4
- Directed by: Ringo Lam
- Written by: Karl Maka
- Produced by: Karl Maka
- Starring: Samuel Hui; Karl Maka; Sylvia Chang; Sally Yeh
- Cinematography: Sander Lee
- Edited by: Tony Chow; Wong Ming-kong
- Music by: Tony Lo
- Production company: Cinema City & Films Co.
- Distributed by: Cinema City
- Release date: 30 January 1986
- Running time: 86 minutes
- Country: Hong Kong
- Language: Cantonese
- Box office: HK$27,012,748

Aces Go Places IV is a 1986 Hong Kong action comedy film directed by Ringo Lam and starring Samuel Hui, Karl Maka, Sylvia Chang and Sally Yeh. It is the fourth film in the Aces Go Places film series.

== Plot ==
Nancy Ho is kidnapped by men searching for a hi-tech prism created by a Hong Kong professor to grant superhuman powers. Ho's husband, his friend, her son and the professor's daughter Sally fly to New Zealand to deliver the prism to the kidnappers. They then band together to stop the prism from being used by the kidnappers.

== Cast ==
- Samuel Hui as King Kong
- Karl Maka as Albert Au
- Sylvia Chang as Supt. Nancy Ho
- Sally Yeh as Sally Bright
- Cyrus Wong as Baldy Jr.
- Ronald Lacey as Leader of the villains
- Kwan Tak-hing as HK Police Ice hockey team coach
- Roy Chiao as The Professor
- Cho Tat-wah as Officer Wah
- Shih Kien as Interpol Ice hockey team coach
- Pomson Shi as Professor's assistant
- Onno Boelee as Hornsby
- Peter McCauley as Digger
- Sandy Dexter as Leader of the villains's henchmen
- Gayle-Anne Jones as Leader of the villains's henchwoman
- Fung Ging Man as Albert's 9th floor neighbor
- Chang Kwok-tse as Passenger on tour bus

== See also ==
- Aces Go Places (film series)
