= Casino Raiders =

1989 Hong Kong film by Jimmy Heung and Wong Jing

- Film poster

Chinese name
- Traditional Chinese: 至尊無上
- Simplified Chinese: 至尊无上
Transcriptions
Standard Mandarin
- Hanyu Pinyin: Zhì Zūn Wú Shàng
Yue: Cantonese
- Jyutping: Zi3 Zyun1 Mou4 Seong6
- Directed by: Jimmy Heung; Wong Jing
- Written by: Wong Jing; Jimmy Heung
- Produced by: Wallace Cheung
- Starring: Andy Lau; Alan Tam; Idy Chan; Rosamund Kwan
- Cinematography: Joe Chan; Lee Chi-wai
- Edited by: Robert Choi
- Music by: James Wong; Romeo Diaz
- Production company: Win's Entertainment
- Distributed by: Golden Harvest
- Release date: 29 June 1989
- Running time: 127 minutes
- Country: Hong Kong
- Language: Cantonese
- Budget: HK$30,000,000
- Box office: HK$23,292,339

Casino Raiders
- Traditional Chinese: 至尊無上
- Literal meaning: Absolutely Paramount
Transcriptions
Standard Mandarin
- Hanyu Pinyin: Zhi zun wu shang
Yue: Cantonese
- Jyutping: zi3 zyun1 mou4 seong6

Casino Raiders is a 1989 Hong Kong action drama film written and directed by Jimmy Heung and Wong Jing and starring Andy Lau, Alan Tam, Idy Chan and Rosamund Kwan. It belonged to the early part of the 1989-1996 period, a period when gambling-themed films were dominating the Hong Kong movie scene. It was released one week after Fatal Bet, another film by Heung based on the same true story but filmed in English with different actors in the lead roles. The film was followed by two sequels, No Risk, No Gain (1990) and Casino Raiders II (1991), which have unrelated plots.

== Plot ==
Crab Chan and Sam Law are professional gamblers and best friends. A tycoon named Lung summons them to his casino in Lake Tahoe to help uncover a scam led by a pair of Japanese gamblers, Kung and his son Taro. There, Crab and Sam also meet Koyan Tong, a rich heiress from Hong Kong who is on vacation. Koyan and Sam also develop a relationship.

After the three of them return to Hong Kong, Sam is hunted down by triads members who were sent by Kung to seek revenge. Although Crab catches wind of this and races to save Sam, he suffers a severe injury to his left hand, which affects his gambling skills.

Koyan introduces her father to Sam, who gives Sam a job in his company. Sam ruins the Kungs' plan to scheme money from Mr Tong, and Kung hires more thugs to attack Sam. Sam is hospitalised after an attack, and Mr Tong demands he give up gambling. At Sam and Koyan's engagement, Crab brings his girlfriend Bo Bo to congratulate the two, and is surprised to find that Sam had decided to go straight. Feeling hurt, Crab leaves the party early.

Crab goes to a casino that turns out to be owned by Taro. They gamble, and Taro bets HK$3 million. Before the bet can be completed, the police raid the casino. Crab grabs the case containing Taro's stake and throws it out a window. The police open Crab's case and find most of his stake is made up of counterfeit bills. An angry Taro kidnaps Koyan. Sam is away doing business with his father in-law in Australia, so Crab, who was planning to leave for Brazil with Bo Bo, goes to confront Taro. During the confrontation, Taro shoots and kills Bo Bo. In order to rescue Koyan, Crab is forced to pick between three glasses of wine, two of which contain poison. Kung is convinced that Crab has made the right choice and lets them leave, but Crab, a gambler to the end, was bluffing. The pair escape and Crab succumbs to the poison.

After Sam returns to Hong Kong, he is determined to seek vengeance for Crab. Sam seeks help from Lung and other American casino owners. The Americans also use this as a chance to compete with the Japanese for the interests of casinos in Asia, which created heavy gang warfare. They eventually agree to hold a poker game with Taro representing Japan and Sam representing America. Koyan also brings over HK$1 billion of asset certificates to support Sam.

The players take a break during the final round of the poker game, and Sam is attacked by a hitman in the restroom. Needing hospital attention, Sam asks Koyan to take his place for the final bet. He tells her to bet his entire stake, and since Taro can't match it, he says Koyan should ask him to bets his arm and leg to even it out. Koyan requests this at the gambling table and Taro agrees to it, believing Koyan to be bluffing. Koyan wins with a straight flush. Taro does not want to cut off his arm and leg, so he shoots and kills his father and other audience members before being shot dead by both the Americans and Japanese.

Koyan then goes to see Sam at the hospital where she overhears a conversation between Sam and the hitman who shot him. The attack in the bathroom was staged by Sam, who was betting that Taro would agree to bet his arm and leg, and after losing the bet that the Kungs would kill each other. Sam does not intend to let Koyan know about this secret, saying he would conceal it forever. After hearing this, Koyan removes her engagement ring, places it outside Sam's room and leaves.

== Cast ==
- Andy Lau as Crab Chan
- Alan Tam as Sam Law
- Idy Chan as Koyan Tong
- Rosamund Kwan as Bo Bo
- Charles Heung as Lung
- Eddy Ko as Gold Teeth
- Robin Shou as Sam's hired hitman
- Kirk Wong as San
- Lung Fong as Taro
- Gregory Charles Rivers as Bellboy
- Hagiwara Kenzo as Mr Kung
- Shum Wai as Uncle Shi
- Ronald Wong as Informer
- Bruce Fontaine as Sam's hired stuntman
- Mike Abbott as Sam's hired stuntman
- Roger Thomas as Mr Fransolini's thug

== See also ==
- Andy Lau filmography
- List of Hong Kong films
