= Aces Go Places 5: The Terracotta Hit =

1989 Hong Kong film by Lau Kar-leung

- DVD cover
- Traditional Chinese: 新最佳拍檔
- Simplified Chinese: 新最佳拍档
- Hanyu Pinyin: Xīn Zuì Jiā Pāi Dǎng
- Jyutping: San1 Zeoi4 Gaai1 Paak3 Dong3
- Directed by: Lau Kar-leung
- Written by: Chang Kwok-tse
- Produced by: Karl Maka
- Starring: Samuel Hui; Karl Maka; Leslie Cheung; Nina Li Chi
- Cinematography: Paul Chan; Joe Chan; Hung Hin-sing
- Edited by: Wong Ming-lam
- Music by: Richard Lo; Teddy Robin
- Distributed by: Cinema City Company
- Release date: 28 January 1989
- Running time: 103 minutes
- Country: Hong Kong
- Language: Cantonese
- Box office: HK$20,032,206

Aces Go Places 5: The Terracotta Hit is a 1989 Hong Kong action comedy film directed by Lau Kar-leung with action choreography by Lau Kar-wing. This is the fifth installment in the Aces Go Places film series. It was released in the United States as Mad Mission 5: The Terracotta Hit. It is the last one to feature the same cast members, and the last to be produced by Cinema City Enterprises before the company's closure in 1991.

== Plot ==
King Kong and Baldy, the "Aces," part ways in 1986 after a mission in Thailand to kidnap a woman on her way to marry her boyfriend (a rich man claiming to be her husband enlisted the Aces' services) goes sour. Three years later, figures from the famous Terracotta Army and a Qin Dynasty bronze sword called the "Chinese Excalibur" are stolen during their transport to an exhibition in Hong Kong. Based on pictures that appear in the media, the two men are accused of the heist. By this time, King Kong is running an investment company that has long since been in the red, and Baldy - who sent his wife and son to Canada - is hiding in a Sai Kung houseboat from creditors who lent him money to invest in the stock market.

When a muscular MSS operative called the Chinese Rambo separately visits Baldy and King Kong (with indirect approval from the Hong Kong Police Force command, who have long since disowned them), both men decide to find those who framed them to clear their names.

They discover that a brother-sister tandem calling themselves the "New Aces" took the pictures during the heist and wore face masks of the two men's likenesses while getting away with stealing the Chinese Excalibur. They interrogate them inside Baldy's houseboat, and as the siblings try to escape, they plunge into the water and go back to the house during which a Chinese ship tows the houseboat. All four of them are sent to Beijing prison camp and imprisoned to answer for the crime. They are forced to undergo a staged execution until the Chinese Rambo offers them a chance to get out of prison in exchange for helping the Chinese government recover the figures. The four Aces agree to help recover the figures from the White Gloves syndicate. They begin training in martial arts because Beijing specifically orders that the figures must not be damaged by any means. However, the Chinese Rambo calls off the training, explaining that the Chinese government will try to get the figures back through diplomatic means.

Despite the turn of events, the four Aces band together and proceed with the mission. A furious battle inside the White Gloves' hideout, which even involves the use of the Chinese Excalibur, results in the quartet recovering the figures. King Kong, Baldy, and the New Aces join the Hong Kong police in sending off the Chinese Rambo, who is safeguarding the shipment back to China.

== Cast ==
- Samuel Hui as King Kong
- Karl Maka as Baldy
- Leslie Cheung as Brother thief
- Nina Li Chi as Sister thief
- Conan Lee as the Chinese Rambo
- Melvin Wong as Boss's aide
- Ellen Chan as Ellen
- Danny Lee as Prisoner
- Fennie Yuen as Baldy's niece
- Roy Cheung as Murderer King
- Maria Cordero as Woman in window
- Brad Kerner as White Gloves
- Cho Tat-wah as Uncle Wah
- Ha Chi-jan as Rambo's assistant
- Wayne Archer as Boss's thug
- Mark Houghton as Boss's thug
- Billy Chong as Boss's thug
- James Ha as Boss's thug
- Lau Kar-wing as Thai horse rider
- Hung Yan-yan as Thai horse rider
- Montatip Keawprasert as May
- Deborah Grant as Deborah
- Lu Yan as Lui Yin
- Jim James as police officer
- Ernest Mauser as police officer

== Box office ==
This film grossed HK$20,032,206 during its theatrical run from 28 January to 22 February 1989 in Hong Kong.

== See also ==
- Aces Go Places (film series)
