= Lucky Stars Go Places =

1986 Hong Kong film by Eric Tsang

- Film poster

Chinese name
- Traditional Chinese: 最佳福星
- Simplified Chinese: 最佳福星
Transcriptions
Standard Mandarin
- Hanyu Pinyin: Zuì Jiā Fú Xīng
Yue: Cantonese
- Jyutping: Zeoi3 Gaai1 Fuk1 Sing1
- Directed by: Eric Tsang
- Written by: Barry Wong
- Story by: Lo Kin; Barry Wong; Anthony Chan; Alfred Cheung; Sze-to Cheuk-hon; Eric Tsang; Karl Maka; Sammo Hung
- Produced by: Sammo Hung
- Starring: Sammo Hung; Andy Lau; Alan Tam; Kent Cheng; Karl Maka; Sylvia Chang
- Cinematography: Cheung Shing-tung; Lam Lai-hing
- Edited by: Peter Cheung
- Music by: Violet Lam; Sherman Chow
- Production companies: Paragon Films; Bo Ho Films
- Distributed by: Golden Harvest
- Release date: 20 June 1986
- Running time: 95 minutes
- Country: Hong Kong
- Language: Cantonese
- Box office: HK$23,109,809

Lucky Stars Go Places (Chinese: 最佳福星), also known as The Luckiest Stars, is a 1986 Hong Kong action comedy film directed by Eric Tsang. It is the fourth film in the Lucky Stars series. It was an attempt to combine the original Lucky Stars troupe with the similar action comedy ensemble from the Aces Go Places series. The film stars original Lucky Stars member Sammo Hung along with new Lucky Stars members Andy Lau, Alan Tam, Kent Cheng, Anthony Chan and Billy Lau as well as Aces Go Places stars Karl Maka and Sylvia Chang, while other Lucky Star members Tsang, Richard Ng, Stanley Fung and Michael Miu make cameo appearances.

== Background ==
The original trilogy of films, Winners and Sinners, My Lucky Stars and Twinkle, Twinkle Lucky Stars were directed by and starred Sammo Hung. They featured appearances from Jackie Chan and Yuen Biao and blended comedy with kung fu action. Lucky Stars Go Places was directed by Eric Tsang and produced by Hung, who did not direct and only acted in a supporting role. This, combined with the absence of Chan and Yuen, meant that the film contained significantly less kung fu action. Furthermore, the other members of the original Lucky Stars gang only have cameo roles in this film.

== Plot ==
Kidstuff (Sammo Hung) has been asked by police superintendent Walter Tso (Cho Tat-wah) to investigate a case of international ammunition trade between two gangs. One of the gangs is the Japanese Yakuza in possession of stolen diamonds, and the other is a group of terrorists with a stockpile of ammunition. Whilst visiting the police station, Kidtuff meets Quito (Sylvia Chang), an old friend from when they were in the orphanage. As they embrace each other in a friendly hug, some passing police officers get the wrong idea and decide to tell her husband, Albert (Karl Maka). Albert refuses to listen to Quito and attempts to fight Kidstuff. Later, when Kidstuff and Quito decide to dine together, Albert secretly hides under their table.

Kidstuff goes to ask his old Lucky Stars gang for help (the returning Eric Tsang, Richard Ng and Stanley Fung, and newcomer Michael Miu). However, they refuse to help as they have embarked on a new crime spree, so Kidstuff is forced to find a new gang.

First he recruits Top Dog (Alan Tam), so called because of his affinity with (and ability to speak to) dogs. Second is Fat Cat (Kent Cheng), a lazy, corrupt cop, who joins because Kidstuff throws money at him. Next is Lambo (Andy Lau) a martial arts expert of the SDU's in hong kong and lady's man, followed by Long Legs (Anthony Chan) and Libbogen (Billy Lau), a pair of timid beat cops who flee in the face of danger. To complete the unlikely group, Yum Yum (Maria Tung) is assigned to teach the gang her skills of self-defence and disguise. However, the gang ends up not learning anything in their three-day training as they were busy with their numerous attempts to grope her.

One day, the gang, disguised as Arabian clients, along with Yum Yum, arrive at Fushime's villa to conduct a trade and was welcomed to stay in the villa for a night. There, they sneak into Fushime's safe, with Top Dog keeping out on the outside and find the diamonds and swallow them, but accidentally lock themselves inside the safe and were later captured and tied up. Top Dog meets up with Kidstuff and informs him of the situation so Kidstuff demands Tso to rescue them. However, Tso does not want to public to know of the mission and locks Kidstuff in a mental hospital, where Albert attempts to fight him again.

Meanwhile, the gang and Yum Yum manage to free themselves and Lambo takes on Fushime on a fight while the rest fight and take out Fushime's top henchman, Doyuta. Eventually, Kidstuff arrives to take over and defeats Fushime and Albert also arrives and taunts Kidstuff and tells him to play Russian roulette to prove his love for Quitto. Kidstuff takes Albert's revolver and shoots himself five times and were luckily empty slots and tells Albert to do the same, but Albert laughs at him for his stupidity and says his life is more important than his wife, which Quitto walks in just in time to hear and slaps him.

== Cast ==
- Sammo Hung as Eric Ng (伍家廉), nicknamed Kidstuff (鷓鴣菜), a former thief and the leader of the Lucky Stars.
- Andy Lau as Lambo (藍保), an elite cop with outstanding martial arts skills and agility who longs to become a special forces officer. He is tricked into joining the mission when Inspector Wong sets him up to seem like he murdered his own colleague on his test for the special force.
- Alan Tam as Top Dog (狗王伦), a police constable who can speak to dogs.
- Kent Cheng as Fat Cat (肥豹), a lazy and corrupt sergeant who abuses his power.
- Anthony Chan as Long Legs (高佬), a timid beat cop who flees when crime appears in front of him
- Billy Lau as Libbogen / Lib-Bogen (力保健), Long Leg's equally timid partner.
- Maria Tung as Yum Yum (一品香), a beautiful police inspector who is recruited to train the new Lucky Stars in combat and disguise.
- Karl Maka as Albert Au (區瑞強 ), nicknamed Baldy (光頭佬), a bumbling chief inspector and Quito's husband who is jealous of Kidstuff.
- Sylvia Chang as Quito (蚊滋), a tough police inspector who is Albert's wife and Kidstuff's childhood friend and first love.
- Tetsuya Matsui as Yukio Fushime (哲木幸男), a Yakuza leader.
- Alfred Cheung as Fushime's translator.
- Cho Tat-wah as Walter Tso (曹達華), superintendent of the Criminal Investigation Department (CID) who recruits Kidstuff to steal the diamonds from Fushime.
- Stanley Fung as Rawhide (犀牛皮), an original Lucky Stars member who has become a bank robber.
- Richard Ng as Sandy an original Lucky Stars member who has become a bank robber.
- Eric Tsang as Roundhead (羅漢果), an original Lucky Stars member who has become a bank robber.
- Michael Miu as Pagoda (花塔餅), an original Lucky Stars member who has become a bank robber.
- Wong Ching as Inspector Wong (王幫辦), a police officer who assists Kidstuff in recruiting the new Lucky Stars.
- Teresa Ha as Sister Ping (萍姐), Yum Yum's housekeeper who Fat Cat makes love with thinking she was Yum Yum in disguise.
- Joao Antonio Gomes as Doyuta, Fushime's top henchman.
- James Tien as Lambo's commanding officer.
- Anders Nelsson as Officer Raygun (列根), Tso's subordinate who asks his boss for permission to but food at 7-Eleven when he gets hungry during a meeting.
- Wong Jing as Tiny who hits his cheating wife under the advice of Baldy.
- Pauline Wong as Tiny's wife who cheated on him.
- Norman Chui as Sum Sing-yee (沈勝衣), an undercover cop killed by Fushime.
- Ken Boyle as Kissing Fish (接吻魚), an arms dealer who colludes with Fushime.
- Bolo Yeung as a cinema patron who threatens Top Dog when the latter was laughing while an emotional scene from Heart of Dragon was playing.
- Chiang Cheng as a cinema patron who threatens Top Dog.
- Steve Mak as a cinema patron who threatens Top Dog.
- Fung Hark-On as Fushime's henchman.
- Lau Kar-wing as Tso's subordinate who suggests to steal the diamonds.
- Barry Wong as a police officer.
- Luk Ying-hong as a police officer.
- Fung Ging Man as a police officer.
- Billy Ching as a police detective.
- Lee Chi-kit as Fushime's bodyguard.
- Steven Hoh as a cop in a restaurant who is part of an act to trick Fat Cat in joining the mission.
- King Lee as Fushime's bodyguard.
- Yuen Miu as Fushime's thug.
- Chu Tau as Fushime's thug.
- Chow Kam-kong
- Hsiao Hou as a policeman.
- Danny Poon
- Wong Ying-kit as a policeman at the police station cafeteria.
- Lau Leung-fat as a fast food restaurant manager.
- Lo Kin as a rascal at fast food restaurant.

== See also ==
- Sammo Hung filmography
- Andy Lau filmography

== Box office ==
The film earned HK$23,109,809 at the Hong Kong box office from 20 June to 24 July 1986.
