= Fatal Bet =

1989 Hong Kong film by Jimmy Heung and Dick Tso

- Film poster
- Directed by: Jimmy Heung; Kin-Nam Cho (as Dick Tso)
- Written by: Wong Jing; Jimmy Heung
- Produced by: Wallace Cheung; Wong Jing
- Starring: Mark Arnold; Murray McRae
- Cinematography: Henry Chan
- Edited by: Brian Schwegmann
- Music by: James Wong; Tang Siu-Lam
- Production companies: Movie Impact; Win's Film Productions; Win's Movie Productions Ltd.
- Release date: 22 June 1989
- Running time: 90 minutes
- Country: Hong Kong
- Language: English
- Budget: HK$8,750,000

Fatal Bet is a 1989 Hong Kong action drama film written and directed by Jimmy Heung and Kin-Nam Cho (as Dick Tso). It belonged to the early part of the 1989-1996 period, a period when gambling-themed films were dominating the Hong Kong movie scene.

== Plot ==
Soon after being released from a Hong Kong prison, professional gambler Crab and his friend Sam are summoned by a tycoon named Dragon to his casino in Lake Tahoe to crack a baccarat scam being run by the half-Chinese and half-Japanese Taro and his father Gubon, head of a powerful Japanese syndicate. There, Crab and Sam also meet Catherine Ashley, a rich heiress who is on vacation. Catherine and Sam also develop a relationship.

After the three of them return to Hong Kong, Sam is being hunted down by Japanese gangsters who were sent by Gubon to seek revenge. Fortunately, Sam is rescued by Crab. However, this leads to Crab severely injuring his left hand, which affects his gambling skills.

Catherine introduces her father to Sam, who is arranged to work in his future father in-law's company. There, Sam also ruins the plan by Taro and Gubon to scheme money from his father-in-law, and Gubon therefore hires more killers to kill Sam, and this time, he becomes injured and hospitalised.

One day, Taro tells Crab that he wants to play against Sam. Crab instead offers to play against Taro himself for a bet of half a million dollars, but the police unexpectedly break in. Although they are not prosecuted because Taro's stake was thrown outside, it is revealed that most of Crab's stakes were counterfeit bills and Taro feels offended. Taro retaliates by kidnapping Catherine and challenges Crab to retrieve her. Crab leaves his girlfriend alone while he goes to confront Taro, during which time one of Taro's men comes and kills her.

Crab fights with Taro's henchmen but is then challenged to a game by Gubon. In order to rescue Catherine, Crab is forced to pick between two glasses of wine, one of which contains poison. Gubon is convinced that Crab has made the right choice and lets them leave, but Crab succumbs to the poison after he and Catherine escape.

Sam is determined to seek vengeance for his friend's death. Catherine lends him money to be able to gamble at a poker game run by Taro and Gubon. During the intermission of the final round of the poker game, Sam is shot by a hitman in the restroom. The injured Sam entrusts Catherine to take his place for the final bet. He tells her to bet their entire stake because Taro will not have a sufficient stake. Catherine bets all of her assets of $50 million, which Gubon cannot match, so she also requests the left arm and leg of Taro. Gubon agrees, but Catherine has to bet her hand as well to make the bet fair. In the end, Catherine wins with a straight flush. Taro does not want to cut off his arm and leg, so he shoots and kills his father and other audience members before being shot dead by both the Americans and Japanese.

Catherine then goes to see Sam at the hospital where she overhears a conversation between Sam and the hitman who shot him. It is revealed that the attack in the bathroom was staged by Sam himself in order to have Taro agree to bet his arm and leg and ultimately have the Gubon and Taro kill each other, achieving his ultimate goal of seeking vengeance for Crab. Sam also says he does not intend to let Catherine know about this secret and instead, he would conceal it forever. After hearing this, Catherine removes her engagement ring, leaves it on the floor outside Sam's room, and leaves.

== Cast ==
- Mark Arnold as Sam
- Murray McRae as Crab
- James Barnett as Meatball/Mr Burton
- Ken Boyle as Don Frasanini
- Philip Chan
- Nancy Cser as Catherine Ashley
- Charles Heung as Dragon
- Jack Holloway
- Eddy Ko as Gold Teeth
- Lung Fong as Taro
- Daniel Mintz
- Kenzo Ogiwara as Gubon
- Yasuhiro Shikamura as Kwei
- Kirk Wong as Sergeant Telly

== Production ==
Fatal Bet is based on the same true story as Heung's film Casino Raiders and has virtually the same plot. Heung decided to use a budget of HK$8,750,000 to direct two versions of the story, one in Cantonese and one in English for international audiences. Many of the minor characters are played by the same actors, including extras.

== Release ==
The film was launched a week before Casino Raiders in Hong Kong.

== Reception ==
Reviewer Niels Matthijs of onderhond.com gave the film a rating of 1 out of 5 stars.

== See also ==
- List of Hong Kong films
