= Winnie Lau =

Hong Kong singer and actress

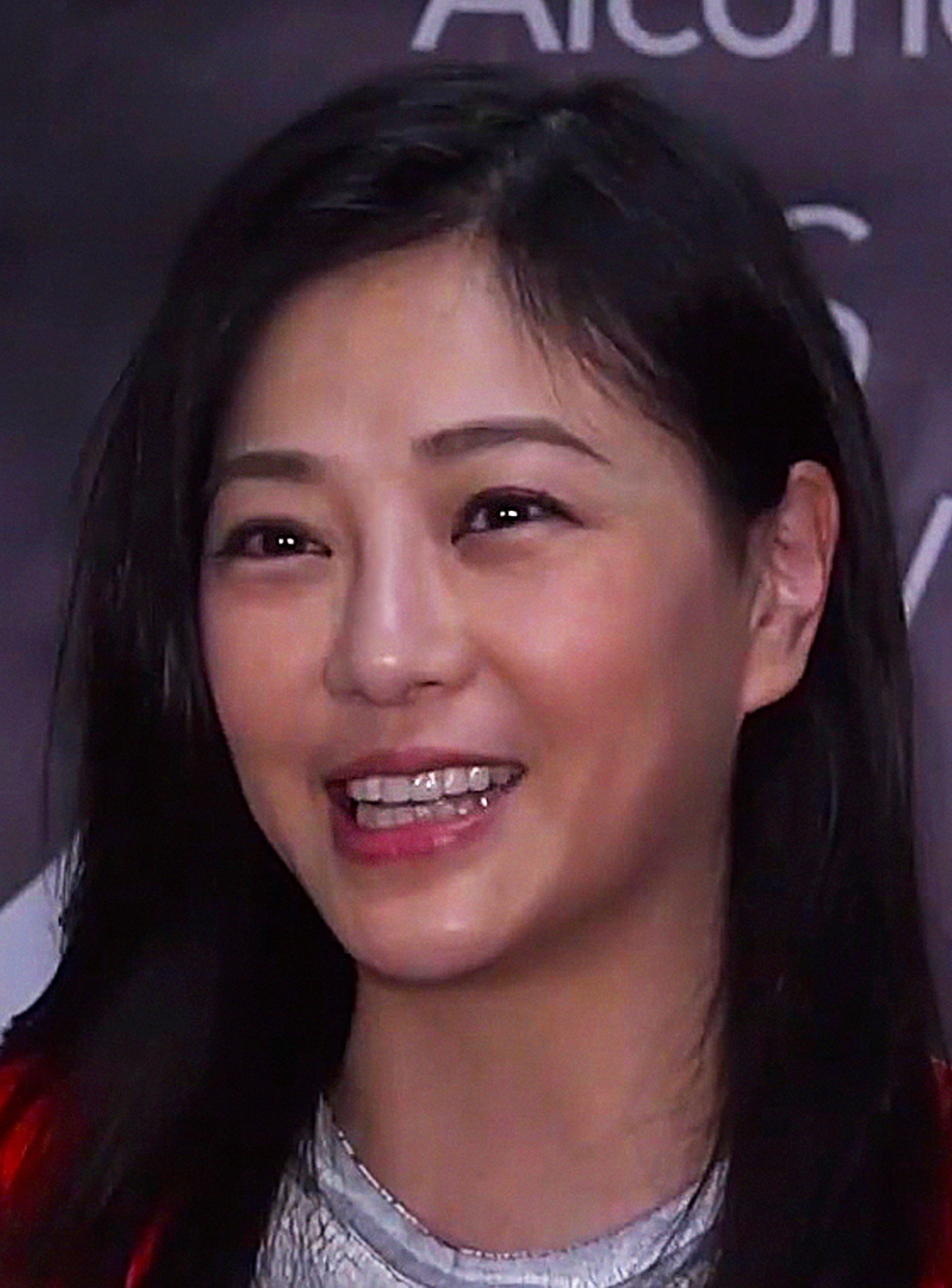
- Lau in 2020
- Born: 24 July 1971 (age 55); Hong Kong
- Occupations: Singer; actress
- Years active: 1985–1998, 2003–2006
- Spouse: Edmond So (m. 1998)
- Children: Yumi (1999), Ina (2007)

Chinese name
- Traditional Chinese: 劉小慧
- Simplified Chinese: 刘小慧
Transcriptions
Standard Mandarin
- Hanyu Pinyin: Liú Xiǎo Huì
Yue: Cantonese
- Jyutping: lau4 siu2 wai3
- Musical career
- Origin: Hong Kong
- Genres: Cantopop, Mandopop
- Instrument: Vocals

Winnie Lau Siu Wai (born 24 July 1971) is a Hong Kong singer and actress. She has two daughters with her husband, Edmund So, from Grasshopper.

== Discography ==
- Sin of Lonely
- Showing All the Feelings
- Denon Mastersonic Series
- Unwilling to Part With
- Change Selection
- The Classical Songs of Universal
- Love Is Gone
- Thank You for Loving Me

=== Filmography ===
Year	Title	Role	Notes
1991	Twin Bracelets 雙鐲	Lau Siu-wai (Hsiu)	
1993	Legend of the Liquid Sword 笑俠楚留香	Sung Tim-yee	
1993	Future Cops 超級學校霸王	Siu-Wai/Crab Angel	
