= Hong Kong Godfather (1991 film) =

1991 Hong Kong film by Ho Cheuk-wing

- Film poster
- Traditional Chinese: 衝擊天子門生
- Simplified Chinese: 冲击天子门生
- Hanyu Pinyin: Chōng Jí Tiān Zǐ Mén Shēng
- Jyutping: Cung1 Gik1 Tin1 Zi2 Mun4 Sang1
- Directed by: Ho Cheuk-wing
- Screenplay by: Nam Yin
- Produced by: Chan Chi-ming
- Starring: Andy Lau; Roy Cheung; Tommy Wong; Lung Fong; Yu Li; Joey Wong
- Cinematography: Ray Wong
- Edited by: Kwok Ting-hung
- Music by: Jim Sam
- Production company: Wang Fat Film Production
- Distributed by: Golden Princess Amusement
- Release date: 12 September 1991
- Running time: 94 minutes
- Country: Hong Kong
- Language: Cantonese
- Box office: HK$8,799,652

Hong Kong Godfather is a 1991 Hong Kong action film directed by Ho Cheuk-wing and starring Andy Lau.

== Plot ==
Inspector Sam Lam (Lo Lieh) leads a drug raid and arrests the wife of Hoi Lung Triad leader Woody (Bill Lung) and the latter pleads with Hung Hing Triad leader Koo Sau-chung (Pau Fong), an ally of Sam, to negotiate with Sam to release his wife. Sau-chung meets up with Sam in a restaurant where the former was abducted by thugs and let off in the middle of the highway while the latter was shot dead by killers. Inspector Leung Chun-pong (Roy Cheung) of the Kowloon Regional Anti Triad Unit suspects Sau-chung being behind the murder of Sam and leads his squad to search the Koo mansion but leaves after failing to find any evidence. Sau-chung's third son, York (Andy Lau) arranges his father to flee to Taiwan to avoid arrest and clear connections with Sam in order to preserve the latter's reputation as an officer. Sau-chung appoints his eldest son, Mark (Jason Pai), as leader of Hung Hung before leaving but personally entrusts York to look over the triad and their businesses.

Later, after Sau-chung's second son, Michael (Tommy Wong) injures Woody's head believing the latter set his father up, Woody's close ally, Keung Wan Triad leader Fred (Lung Fong) sabotages him claiming Sau-chung was behind the drug raid and framed Woody for Sam's murder and prompts Woody to send his underlings to kill a number of Hung Hing's gangsters. While the Hung Hing Triad is coming up with a strategy to Hoi Lung, York sets up a negotiation with Sam, buy York was ambushed by Fred's thugs on the way and fights them off. Afterwards, Leung finds out York and Mark were going to Macau he leads his squad at the ferry port, but they were ambushed at the parking lot by Fred's hitmen, where Mark recognizes one of them as Sam's murderer. A firefight ensues where Mark was mortally wounded.

After Mark's death, York was elected as the new leader of Hung Hing and he orders a mass killing of Hung Lung and Keung Wan's gangsters in major gang fights and York, Fred and Woody were arrested by Leung and detained by 48 hours. After the three were released, Leung orders his subordinates to closely tail them. York reunites with his girlfriend, Jenny (Yu Li), before leading his underlings to kill Fred's hitmen after finding their hideout. Leung steps in to stop York, but joins forces with York after the latter saves him from being shot and kill the hitmen. Instead of arresting York, Leung lets him off while informing him that the police has found out his father is innocent for Sam's murder. Sau-chung returns to Hong Kong and Woody wants to negotiate a settlement with him, but Michael suspects Woody to have something dirty up his sleeve so he leads his underlings and attack Woody at his office where Woody stabs Michael during a scuffle. When Woody runs to hide in the restroom, Fred shoots him dead. Leung attempts to persuade York to cooperate with the police but York is determined on seeking revenge on Fred to avenge his brothers and delays his wedding with Jenny.

While Sau-chung and York hold a Taosist ritual memorial for Mark and Sam, Fred arrives with his entire gang armed with machetes while York also leads out his armed gang. A group of riot police officers led by Leung warns them to drop their weapons but Fred disregards it and charges in with his gang, leading to a major gangfight. During the chaos, York confronts Fred in a scuffle before the latter runs off to a nearby construction site. York gives chase and eventually disables Fred while Leung follows and draws his pistol at York to prevent him killing Fred, but York kills Fred by cutting the ropes of suspending cement tube which falls on Fred, and is arrested.

Despite being responsible for catching Sam's murderer and smashing the Hung Hing, Hoi Lung and Keung Wan Triads, crime rate has also risen up by 80% since Leung joined the Kowloon division and as a result, he was transferred to be an instructor of the police academy. Leung then visits York in prison, stating they would be an unbeatable crime fighting duo if York was an officer, while York also states they would be invincible if Leung was his triad partner.

== Cast ==
- Andy Lau as York Koo (古小玉), the calm and wise third son of Koo Sau-chung. Initially reluctant after elected to take over the Hung Hing Triad (洪興社), but he is determined to use his influence to avenge his brothers.
- Roy Cheung as Leung Chun-pong (梁振邦), newly appointed inspector of the Regional Anti Triad Unit of Kowloon Division fresh off from training in the United Kingdom. An upright and by the books officer, he comes to admire York seeing him as an honorable triad.
- Tommy Wong as Michael Koo (古國武), the impulsive and abrasive second son of Sau-chung who resorts to violence against rivals.
- Lung Fong as Fred (阿飛), leader of the Keung Wan Triad (強運社) who instigates a rift between the Hung Hung and Hoi Lung Triad to expand the influence of his own triad.
- Yu Li as Jenny Lam, York's fiance and Sam's daughter.
- Joey Wong as Mrs. Leung (梁太), Leung Chun-pong's wife.
- Alan Tang
- Jason Pai as Mark Koo (古國文), the indecisive elder son of Sau-chung who is well liked by the Hung Hing Triad.
- Pau Fong as Koo Sau-chung (古守忠), the honorable and benevolent leader of the Hung Hing Triad and patriarch of the Koo family who has gone legit.
- Lo Lieh as Sam Lam (林森), inspector of the Narcotics Bureau who is Jenny's father and a close friend of Sau-chung.
- Lam Chung as Leung's subordinate who colludes with Fred.
- Lau Kong as Detective Lau (劉Sir), Leung's subordinate and an ally of the Hung Hing Triad.
- Bill Lung as Woody (阿和), leader of the Hoi Lung Triad (海龍社) engaging in drug trafficking who was sabotaged by Fred.
- Kong Foo-tak as Fred's hitman who killed Sam and Mark.
- Alan Ng as Koo Kwok-cheung (古國祥), the fourth and youngest son of Sau-chung who is a doctor and not involved in the family's triad business.
- Lo Hung as Inspector Leung's superior officer.
- Stephen Wong
- Raymond Yu
- Kong Foo-keung as Fred's hitman.
- Hung Chi-sing as a policeman.
- Yeung Kin-wai as Mark's wife.
- Fung Man-kwong
- Lee Yung
- Lee Hok-leung
- Leung Kam-san as Uncle Wai (懷叔叔), one of the elder members of the Hung Hing Triad.
- Wai Ching as a Hung Hing Triad member.
- Jack Wong as York's underling.
- Stephen Tung as police truck driver.
- Jacky Cheung Chun-hung as Hung Hong Triad member.
- Wai Nai-yip as a bodyguard.
- Yu Ming-hin
- Chan King-chi
- Ching Kwok-leung as Fred's hitman.
- Robert Zajac
- Chun Kwai-po
- Wong Kim-wai
- Fan Chin-hung
- Choi Hin-cheung
- Ling Chi-hung
- Ho Wing-cheung
- Mandy Chan
- Douglas Kung
- Woo Wing-tat
- Chan Siu-wah
- Fei Kin
- Tang Tai-wo
- Ha Kwok-wing
- Sam Wong
- Christopher Chan
- Jameson Lam

== Reception ==
=== Critical reception ===
Mike Fury of Hong Kong Cinemagic gave the film a positive review praising its realistic action scenes, characters and balanced approach to the conflict between police and criminals.

=== Box office ===
The film grossed HK$8,799,652 at the Hong Kong box office during its theatrical run from 12 September to 3 October 1991.
