= Maria Cordero =

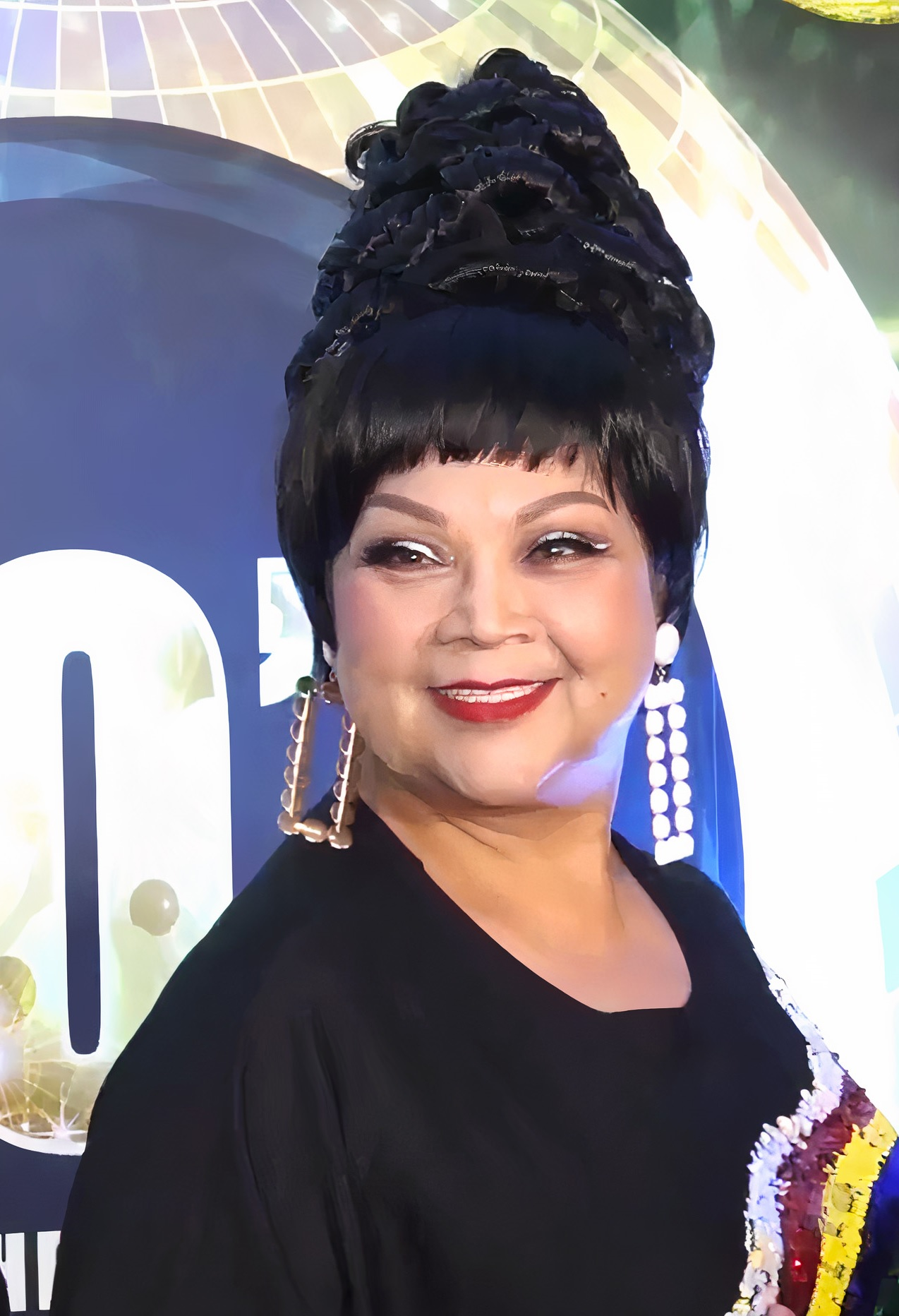
- Attending a charity banquet on 22 October 2018
- Born: 18 February 1954 (age 72); Portuguese Macau
- Occupations: Singer, actress, TV host, DJ
- Spouse: Rick da Silva (m. 1999 - 2020)

Chinese name
- Traditional Chinese: 瑪俐亞
- Simplified Chinese: 玛俐亚
Transcriptions
Standard Mandarin
- Hanyu Pinyin: Mǎ Lìyà
Yue: Cantonese
- Jyutping: Maa^{5} Lei^{6} Aa^{3}
- Musical career
- Also known as: Fat Mama (肥媽)
- Origin: Hong Kong
- Genre: Cantopop

Mariam Maria Cordero Bibi, MH (Chinese: 瑪俐亞), nicknamed Fat Mama (Chinese: 肥媽), is a Macanese singer, actress, TV Host and DJ based in Hong Kong. She also has her own cooking show, Maria's Kitchen (肥媽私房菜) on Cable TV.

== Biography ==
Cordero was born to a Macanese family of Portuguese-Chinese heritage at the Hospital Conde S. Januário in Macau in 1954. She is of paternal Portuguese descent. Her family moved to Shelley Street, Hong Kong when she was ten years old. When she was eleven her father died, and she began working to support her seven brothers and sisters. She resorted to using identity cards from friends, because the legal working age in Hong Kong was 14. Her first job was as an usher for a local cinema.

While working as a hotel telephone operator, Cordero came across the opportunity to learn the bass guitar. The hotel resident band found out and hired her to play at night after she auditioned. For several years she worked a triple job of telephone operator in the day, band player at night, and working as a cashier. But she also worked as a line cook for takeaway contractors for office workers, thus having excellent cooking skills, which led to her having hosted 3 food and cuisine shows.

Cordero married a widowed Filipino pianist and bandmate 22 years her senior when she was in her late teens. She and her first husband have been divorced since 1989 and now married to Portuguese engineer. In 2020, Rick de Silva died due to terminal lung adenocarcinoma. She is the mother of six children (two boys with her ex-husband, two boys and two girls from her ex-husband's previous marriage). Her eldest son Alfonso Bibi Cordero (Chinese: 高進一) is a member of the Hong Kong Hockey Team which won the bronze medal in the 2009 East Asian Games.

=== Singing and movie career ===
Cordero's singing career began after word spread about her singing ability at a newly opened disco in 1985. Offers of recording contracts, movie roles, and stage performances came after a string of hits which began with a tailor-made song written for her by director and songwriter Teddy Robin, titled "Sai Hei". Parts of this song were also used in one of Edison Chen's track 嘥氣 (Waste of breath).

== Filmography ==
- City on Fire (龍虎風雲, 1987)
- The Good, The Bad & The Beauty (1988)
- Bet on Fire (1988)
- Walk on Fire (1988)
- Women Prison (1988)
- King of Stanley Market (1988)
- Vampire Vs. Vampire (1989)
- Mr. Coconut (1989)
- Crocodile Hunter (1989)
- Mr. Sunshine (1989)
- Carry On Yakuza (1989)
- Aces Go Places 5 (1989)
- Pedicab Driver (1989)
- The Little Mermaid (1989) (voice-over for Pat Carroll) – Ursula (Cantonese dub)
- Jail House Eros (1989)
- To Spy With Love (1990)
- Tiger on the Beat 2 (1990)
- The Banquet (1991)
- Second to None (1992)
- Gangs '92 (1992)
- Fatal Love (1993)
- The Enigma of Love (1993)
- Whores from the North (1993)
- Our Neighbour Detective (1994)
- Sexy and Dangerous (1996)
- Street Angels (1996)
- Lost and Found (1996)
- Thanks for Your Love (1996)
- 97 Aces Go Places (1997)
- Chinese Box (1997)
- Knock Off (1998)
- Fing's Raver (2001)
- Let's Love Hong Kong (2002)
- Money Suckers (2002)
- I Want To Get Married (2003)
- Men Suddenly in Black (2003)
- The Miracle Box (2004)
- Forever Yours (2004)
- Invisible Waves (2006)
- Look for a Star (2009)
- From Vegas to Macau (2014)
- Delete My Love (2014)
- From Vegas to Macau III (2016)
- Lucid Dreams (2018)

== Songs ==
- 救命 (Save My Life)
- 友誼之光 (The Light of Friendship)
- 媽媽 I Love You (Mama I Love You)
- You Can't Stop Me Loving You
- Old People

== Personal ==
Cordero has been married twice and was married to her second spouse Rick da Silva from 1999 until his death on November 5, 2020. Her children (including step children) are from her first marriage.
