= Fatal Needles vs. Fatal Fists =

Fatal Needles, Fatal Fists
- DVD cover
- Directed by: Lee Tso Nam
- Written by: Cheung San Yee
- Starring: Don Wong Tao; Lo Lieh; Chang Yi; Tommy Lee Gam Ming; Cheng Fu Hung
- Release date: 1978
- Country: Taiwan

Fatal Needles vs. Fatal Fists (Gou hun zhen duo ming quan) is a 1978 Taiwanese kung fu film directed by Lee Tso Nam, and starring Don Wong Tao and Lo Lieh.

== Plot ==
Capt Chow Lung (Lo Lieh), and vice-Capt Meng Hu (Don Wong) are the 'Bandit Catchers' who are cracking down on crime with a vengeance. That is, until several criminals try to bribe them into looking the other way while they pull off their illegal activities. Naturally, the stand-up officers turn down their bribe and a fight ensues. While attempting to prevent Meng Hu from being impaled with a spear, Chow Lung ends up critically injured and dies shortly afterwards. Meng Hu blames himself and retires from crime fighting only to become a depressed, pathetic drunk. Unable to pay for his "patronage" at a local brothel, the madam sympathizes with his depression and offers him employment to pay off his debts. Eventually, another patron's sexual assault of one of the courtesans causes him (now going by the name of Chen Chai) to interfere despite his refusal to defend himself from being attacked. Despite his refusal to fight, everyone at the brothel considers him a hero and, after being wounded, he is given money to find a doctor. Too injured to find one, he passes out on the doorstep of a martial arts school run by Magistrate Chen (Chui Chung Hei) and is nursed back to health by the magistrates daughter and the schools dutiful servant.

Hoping to pay back this debt (yet, still hopelessly depressed), Chen Chai offers to work there for free, but again, trouble finds him anyway. A white-haired acupuncture master named Chung Tung (Chang Yi) and his band of thugs try to bribe the magistrate into letting opium smugglers operate in the city. The magistrate refuses and tries (but fails) to have Chung Tung arrested. In the meantime, the students at the school become increasingly frustrated with Chen Chai as they assume that he's a coward, that is, until his friend is beaten and stabbed by Chun Tung's henchmen. Pushed to the limit, Chen Chai finally overcomes his cowardice and defends his friend, gaining the admiration of the magistrate and the schools students. Unable to bribe, yet not wanting to outright kill the magistrate or Chen Chai, Chung Tung has 'golden needles' thrust into the magistrate that will kill him in 3-days or if they're removed by someone other than an acupuncture specialist, as he hopes to control Chen Chai and the magistrate using this method. Chen Chai comes up with a plan to help save the magistrate and stop the opium shipments but sadly, Magistrate Chen believes that everyone will give in to Chung Tung just to save him and, removes the needles himself, causing his immediate death. With nothing holding them back, Chen Chai and the magistrates offspring develop an alternative to take out this pack of drug smugglers and get revenge on Chung Tung. Before the final show-down, we also learn of Chung Tung's connection to the death of Meng Hu's (now embracing his real name again) partner, Chow Lung.
