= Ellen Chan =

Hong Kong actress and singer

- Born: February 16, 1966 (age 60); British Hong Kong
- Occupations: Actress, singer

Chinese name
- Traditional Chinese: 陳雅倫
- Simplified Chinese: 陈雅伦
Transcriptions
Standard Mandarin
- Hanyu Pinyin: Chén Yǎ Lún
- Musical career
- Also known as: Nga-lun Chan
- Website: http://www.ellen-chan.com

Ellen Chan Ar-Lun (Chinese: 陳雅倫, born February 16, 1966) is a Hong Kong actress and singer who has appeared in a number of Hong Kong film productions.

== Filmography ==
- Alibis (1977)
- Grow Up in Anger (1986)
- Fury (1988)
- How to Pick Girls Up! (1988)
- The Inspector Wears Skirts (1988)
- Aces Go Places 5: The Terracotta Hit (1989)
- Second Childhood (1989)
- Perfect Match (1989)
- Off Track (1990)
- Lung Fung Restaurant (1990)
- Tiger on the Beat 2 (1990)
- The Other Half (1990)
- Alien Wife (1991)
- Doctor Vampire (1991)
- Wizard's Curse (1992)
- All-Mighty Gamber (1992)
- The Love That Is Wrong (1993)
- Fatal Love (1993)
- On Parole (1993)
- Hello, Who Is It? (1994) [cameo]
- Switch Over (1994)
- Why Wild Girls (1994)
- Eternal Evil of Asia (1995)
- Salon Beauty (2002) [V]
- Market's Romance (2002)
- Unarm 72 Hours (2003)
- Spirit in a Violent House (2003)
- Men Suddenly in Black (2003) [cameo]
- Exiled (2006)
- The Underdog Knight (2008)
- Naked Soldier (2012)
- 7 Assassins (2013)
