= Walter Tso =

Chinese actor in Hong Kong

- 曹達華
- Tso (right) from the film The Furious Buddha's Palm
- Born: 15 September 1915; Taishan, Guangdong, China
- Died: 10 January 2007 (aged 91); London, England
- Other names: Cho Tat-wah, Tso Tat-wah, Cao Dahua
- Years active: 1936–1997, 2001 (62 years)
- Awards: Hong Kong Film Awards – Professional Spirit Award, 2003 Lifetime Achievement Golden Bauhinia Awards – Life Achievement Award, 2001 Lifetime Achievement

Chinese name
- Traditional Chinese: 曹達華
- Simplified Chinese: 曹达华
Transcriptions
Standard Mandarin
- Hanyu Pinyin: Cáo Dáhuá
Yue: Cantonese
- Jyutping: Cou4 Daat6wah4

Walter Tso Tat-Wah (15 September 1915 – 10 January 2007) was a Hong Kong film actor most famous for the roles he played in a number of Wuxia films in the 1950s and 1960s.

Tso and actor Shih Kien starred in a number of films together. The actress Yu So-chow co-starred in many of Tso's films.

Tso's well-known roles include Lung Kim-fei (龍劍飛), Leung Foon (梁寛) and Inspector Wah (華探長).

A native of Taishan, Guangdong, (he spoke Cantonese and Taishanese) Tso began his acting career at the age of 15, and eventually starred in more than 700 film. He was a compulsive gambler. Legend has it that he lost the Wah-tat Studio, which produced most of his films at the time, while gambling, though it is not certain whether the studio was owned by him.

== Selected filmography ==
=== Films ===
- 1936 Tears of the Reed Catkins - Wong Tin-Wah
- 1936 Luhua Lei
- Xiangxiapo Congjun (1937)
- Xihu nu (1937)
- Modeng Wu Dalan (1937)
- Kuang Dauyan (1937)
- Bian fang xue lei (1937)
- Roubo (1937)
- Longcheng Feijian (1938)
- Gong di (1938)
- Xuejian Baoshan Cheng (1938)
- Babai Zhuangshi (1938)
- Shanghai Huoxian Hou (1938)
- Sizi Congjun (1938)
- Yan Ruisheng (1938)
- Liu lang de fu qin (1938)
- Chaimi Fuqi (1938)
- Jinye Ju Xuji (1939)
- Wuyi Dui (1939)
- Sa nian ku ming nu (1939)
- Toudu Hulang Guan (1940)
- Little Guangdong (1940)
- Xiao Guang Dong (1940)
- Shi gui zai chu shi (1940)
- Dayu Sha Jia (1940)
- Chayi Hu (1940)
- Zhao Zilong (1940)
- Xiao Laohu (1941)
- Zheng qi ge (1941)
- Roar of the People (1941)
- Molu Qier (1941)
- Yongchun Sannian (1941)
- Chu qiang hong xing (1941)
- Xuegong Chunse (1941)
- Gone Are the Swallows When the Willow Flowers Wilt (1946)
- The Lady Escort, Part Two (1947)
- Mou furen (1947)
- Nu luo bin han (1947)
- Qi jian shi san xia Shang ji (1949) - Chui Ming-Go
- Qi jian shi san xia xia ji (1949)
- Huang Fei-hong zhuan: Bian feng mie zhu (1949) - Leung Foon
- Huang Fei Hong zhuan: Da po Ba Wang Zhuang (1949) - Leung Foon
- Huang Fei Hong zhuan di san ji xue zhan Liu Hua Qiao (1949) - Leung Foon
- Huang Fei Hong zhuan si ji: Liang Kuan gui tian (1950) - Leung Foon
- Huo shao Shao Lin si (1950)
- Ren hai wan hua tong (1950)
- How Ten Heroes of Guangdong Slew the Dragon (1950) - Mak Tai
- Lei dian zhui feng jian (1951)
- Wu hu duan hun qiang (1951)
- Hu dan ying hun (1952) - Fong Tat
- Qi xia hei xuan feng (1952) - Black Whirlwind
- Ye du Yuan Yang jiang (1953)
- The Killing Spear (1953)
- Ren tou qi an (1955) - Leung, Tai-yim
- Liang Kuan yu Lin Shi Rong (1955) - Leung Foon
- Xu Huang Fei Hong zhuan (1955) - Leung Foon
- Huang Fei Hong hua di qiang pao (1955) - Leung Foon
- Huang Fei Hong wen zhen si pai lou (1955) - Leung Foon
- Huang Fei Hong chang ti jian ba (1955) - Leung Foon
- Fang Shi Yu yu Hu Hui Qian (1955) - Woo Wai Kin
- Huang Fei Hong da nao Fo Shan (1956) - Leung Foon
- Huang Fei Hong du bei dou wu long (1956) - Leung Foon
- Fang Shi Yu yi jiu Hong Xi Guan (1956) - Hung Hei-guan
- Huang Fei Hong san xi nu biao shi (1956) - Leung Foon
- Huang Fei Hong yi jiu long mu miao (1956) - Leung Foon
- Huang Fei Hong nu tun shi er shi (1956) - Leung Foon
- Huang Fei Hong fu er hu (1956) - Leung Foon
- Huang Fei Hong xing shi hui qi lin (1956) - Leung Foon
- Huang Fei Hong Shamian fu shen quan (1956) - Leung Foon
- Huang Fei Hong heng sao Xiao Beijiang (1956) - Wan Tat Tat
- Bu xia xiang wei zhui hun biao (1956)
- Huang Fei Hong Guan Yin Shan xue hen (1956) - Leung Foon
- Huang Fei Hong Guanshan da he shou (1956) - Leung Foon
- Bai hao ying xiong chuan (1956)
- Huang Fei-hong tian hou miao jin xiang (1956) - Leung Foon
- Huang Fei Hong shui di san qin Su Shulian (1956) - Leung Foon
- Huang Fei-hong qi dou huo qi lin (1956) - Leung Foon
- Huang Fei Hong da nao hua deng (1956) - Leung Foon
- Huang Fei-hong Henan yu xie zhan (1957)
- Huang Fei Hong shi wang zheng ba (1957)
- Huang Fei Hong die xie ma an shan (1957) - Leung Foon
- Huang Fei Hong da po fei dao dang (1957) - Leung Foon
- Heng ba qi sheng sheng zi qi (1957)
- Huang Fei-hong ye tan hei long shan (1957) - Leung Foon
- Huang Fei Hong wu du dou shuang long (1958) - Leung Foon
- Huang Fei Hong long zheng hu dou (1958)
- Huang Fei Hong da po jin zhong zhao (1958)
- Huang Fei Hong da nao Feng Huang Gang (1958) - Leung Foon
- Huang Fei Hong lei tai dou wu hu (1958) - Leung Foon
- She diao ying xiong zhuan (1958)
- Huang Fei Hong hu xue jiu Liang Kuan (1958) - Leung Foon
- Sword of Blood and Valour (1958–1959) - Yuen Sing-chi
- Liang Kuan's Fight at Fiery Tiger Pit (1958)
- Huang Fei-hong Saved the Bride at Xiguan (1958)
- Story of the Vulture Conqueror (1958–1959) - Kwok Ching
- Huo zang Lan Tou He (1959) - Tang Lung
- Huang Fei Hong bei kun hei di yu (1959) - Leung Foon
- Huang Fei Hong hu peng fu hu (1959) - Leung Foon
- Huang Fei Hong yi guan Cai hong qiao (1959) - Lau Cham
- Huang Fei Hong lei tai zheng ba zhan (1960) - Leung Foon
- Shisan hao xiong sha an (1960)
- Xing xing wang da zhan Huang Fei Hong (1960) - Leung Foon
- Huang Fei Hong yuan da po wu hu zhen (1961) - Leung Foon
- Bu bu jing hun (1961) - Lee Hoi-Ming
- Sha ren wang da zhan niu ji tan (1961)
- Yi jian jiu lian huan (1961)
- Zhui hun tai ji biao (1961)
- Mo quan zhui xiong (1961) - Inspector Lui Tat
- Kun lun qi jian dou wu long (1961)
- Kun Lun san nu xia (1961) - Cha See Hung
- Xiao Gan Luo bai xiang da jie ju (1962)
- Ru yan jing hun (1962) - Woo Chi-Hung
- Shuang jian meng (1962)
- Shuang jian meng xia ji da jie ju (1962)
- Nu du shou (1962) - Inspector To
- Huang mao guai ren (1962) - Inspector To
- Xian he shen zhen xin zhuan shang ji (1962)
- Chain Murder (1962) - Yeung Sum
- Huo shao gong lian si Shang ji (1963) - Gwai Mo
- Huo shao gong lian si Xia ji (1963) - Gwai Mo
- The Black Centipede (1963)
- Gu rou en chou (1963) - Tse Jun-Wan
- Zhui hun bai gu dao (1963)
- Ye ban ren lang (1963)
- Hong Xian Nu ye dao bao he (1963)
- Lei dian tian xian jian (1963) - Ma Fei-Wan
- Wan jian zhi wang (1963)
- Yin jian jin dao (1964) - Ho Man-Kai / Ho Luk-Long
- Ru lai shen zhang shang ji (1964) - Lung Kim Fai
- Ru lai shen zhang xia ji da jie ju (1964) - Lung Kim Fai
- Ru lai shen zhang san ji da jie ju (1964)
- Ru lai shen zhang si ji da jie ju (1964)
- Man tang ji qing (1964)
- Qian shou shen quan shang ji (1965)
- Qian shou shen quan xia ji (1965)
- Gui gu shen nu (1965) - Lau Tin-Chi
- Ru lai shen zhang nu sui Wan Jian Men (aka The Furious Buddha’s Palm) (1965)
- Te wu yi ling yi (1965)
- Mi mi ke (1966)
- Qi jian shi san xia (1967) - Chui Ming-Go
- Kun Lun san sha shou (1967)
- Supreme Sword (1969) - Fang Tien Hung - also producer
- Secret Agent No. 1 (1970) - Inspector - also director
- The Young Girl Dares Not Homeward (aka Girl Wanders Around) (1970) - Inspector Tao
- Dai heung lei bak min wai fung (1974)
- Hua hua gong zi (1974)
- Shen nu dang fu chuo tou wang (1975) - Chao Chen-tung
- The Legend of the Condor Heroes (1976, TV Series) - Luk Sing-fung
- The Return of the Condor Heroes (1976, TV Series) - Luk Sing-fung
- Avenging Warriors of Shaolin (1979) - Chun's Teacher
- Hui feng hao huang jin da feng bao (1979)
- Za ji wang ming dui (1979) - Leung's Father
- Qi sha (1979) - Yang Chun Yu
- Cha chi nan fei (1980) - Chou Yi Shan
- Wan ren zan (1980) - Liu Jing-Tian
- Shao Lin yu Wu Dang (1980) - Feng Te
- Long li ji (1980)
- A Deadly Secret (1980) - Wan Zhenshan
- Tai Chi Master (1980, TV Series) - Buddhist Monk Hong-ming
- Si yiu (1981) - Chief inspector Liu
- Gui ma zhi duo xing (1981) - Gang Boss
- The Duel of the Century (1981) - Monk Kugua
- Da qiao ying xiong zhuan (1981)
- My Young Auntie (1981) - Ching Fu, Iron Man of Canton
- Aces Go Places (1982) - Uncle Hua
- Carry On Pickpocket (1982) - Glasses Cop
- Jut zai yau che (1982) - Farmer
- San shi nian xi shuo cong tou (1982) - Gangster extra
- Nan xiong nan di (1982)
- Nan xiong nan di (1982)
- Bat sap yee ga fong hak (1982) - Jealous husband
- Ru lai shen zhang (1982) - Tathagata
- 2.5 CM (1982)
- Xiao sheng pa pa (1982)
- Bo jin (1982)
- Xiao zi you zhong (1982)
- Aces Go Places 2 (1983) - Hua
- Jui gwai chat hung (1983) - Drunken Husband
- Tian ji guo he (1983)
- Shao ye Wei Wei (1983)
- Feng sheng shui qi (1983)
- Wu Song (1983)
- Winners and Sinners (1983) - Medicine Man
- Mad Mission 3: Our Man from Bond Street (1984) - Hua
- Huang huo (1984)
- Zi jin xiong di (1984)
- A Friend from Inner Space (1984)
- Fan dau mui (1984) - Principal
- Ai nu xin zhuan (1984) - Old Man in House
- Duo qing zhong (1984)
- My Lucky Stars (1985) - Supt. Walter Tsao
- Gong xi fa cai (1985) - Police Supt.
- Ge wu sheng ping (1985)
- Juk nei ho wan (1985)
- Twinkle, Twinkle Lucky Stars (1985) - Supt. Walter Tsao
- Mo cuo gu (1985)
- Aces Go Places 4 (1986) - Hua
- The Millionaire's Express (1986) - Shanghai Chief Inspector
- Huan le ding dong (1986) - Captain Chan
- 1986 The Family Strikes Back
- 1986 Lucky Stars Go Places - Supt. Walter Tsao
- 1986 Mr. Vampire 2- Police Chief
- 1988 Three Against the World - Detective
- Fat lut mo ching (1988)
- Wu long zei ti shen (1988) - Supt. Walter Tso
- Aces Go Places 5: The Terracotta Hit (1989) - Uncle Wah
- Fa da xian sheng (1989)
- Mang gwai dai ha (1989) - Buddhist God
- Huo bao xing dong (1989)
- Return of the Lucky Stars (1989) - Supt. Walter Tso
- Meng gui zhuang gui (1989)
- Do si lip yan (1989) - Ma Sir
- Huang jia fei feng (1989) - Joe Tso
- Funny Ghost (1989)
- The Iceman Cometh (1989) - Zheng's uncle instructor
- Zhi ming de you huo (1990)
- Hu dan nu er hong (1990) - Yong's Father
- Meng gui ba wang hua (1990) - Officer Chan
- Biao jie, ni hao ye! (1990) - Tzu's ex-comrade
- Ma deng ru lai shen zhang (1990) - Master Koo
- Demoness from Thousand Years (1990) - The Retard's Father
- Wu ye tian shi (1990) - Inspector Chao
- 1994 It's a Wonderful Life - Dai-Foon Yum
- 1996 How to Meet the Lucky Stars - Supt. Walter Tso
- 2001 A Gambler's Story

=== Television series ===
- 1985 The Legendary Prime Minister – Zhuge Liang (TV series) - Pong Tak-gung
- 1986 Rise of the Great Wall (TV series) - King Chiu-seung
- 1986 The Romance of the White Hair Maiden (TV Series) - Taoist Pak-shek

== Personal life ==
In 1990, Tso emigrated to London, England, with his son. In 1993, Tso returned to Hong Kong to join TVB. In 1997, Tso returned to England as his wife was then suffering kidney disease. In 2000, Tso's wife died, he returned alone to Hong Kong. In August 2006, Tso was hospitalised for a month after falling down stairs at his home. In November 2006, Tso returned to England. Tso's son lives in England and his daughter lives in the United States.

In January 2007 Tso died of haemorrhage of stomach in a hospital in London, England.

One of his goddaughters is Connie Chan.
