= Charlie Cho =

Actor in Hong Kong pornography films

- Born: 24 March 1950 (age 76); British Hong Kong

Chinese name
- Traditional Chinese: 曹查理
- Simplified Chinese: 曹查理
Transcriptions

Charlie Cho Cha-lee (曹查理) is an actor in Hong Kong pornography films, especially during the 1980s. His over-acting approach can be regarded as one of the trademarks of Hong Kong soft porn films. He also worked in mainstream films, such as the Jackie Chan feature Police Story and the heist film Four Robbers.

== Personal life ==
Cho's nephew is Hongkong actor Julian Cheung.

== Filmography ==
=== Films ===
Year	Title	Role	Notes/Ref.
1979	Bedtime Stories		
1982	Old Man and the Kid		
1982	Plain Jane to the Rescue	Sand's son	
1982	The 82 Tenants	Developer	
1982	My Darling, My Goddess	Gay man	
1983	Fast Fingers	Cad in Casino	
1983	Hong Kong, Hong Kong		
1983	Let's Make Laugh	Fong's fiancé	
1983	Just for Fun	Big Mouth/Charlie	
1984	The Intellectual Trio	Smarty	
1984	Aces Go Places III: Our Man from Bond Street	Tso	
1984	Prince Charming	Chen Pi Hou	
1984	Aces Go Places II	Wong	
1984	My Darling Genie		
1984	The Ghost Informer	Charles	
1984	I Will Finally Knock You Down, Dad!	Bird Fight Referee	
1984	The Owl vs. Bumbo	Bank Manager	
1985	Danger Has Two Faces		
1985	My Name Ain't Suzie		
1985	The Flying Mr. B		
1985	Love with the Perfect Stranger		
1985	Fascinating Affairs		
1985	Girl with the Diamond Slipper	Film Director Chi	
1985	Let's Have a Baby		
1985	Twisted Love		
1985	Police Story		
1986	Sweet Surrender		
1986	Who's the Crook?		
1986	Ghost Snatchers	Crazy De	
1986	Sweet Sixteen		
1986	Rosa	Li Wei-Feng	
1986	Happy Ghost III	Rock Hudson	
1986	Last Song in Paris	Charles	
1986	The Innocent Interloper	cameo	
1988	The Eighth Happiness	DoDo's prospective suitor	
1988	Police Story 2	John Ko	
1988	How to Pick Girls Up!		
1990	My Neighbours Are Phantoms		
1995	High Risk	Charlie Tso	
2001	Electrical Girl	Dr. Y.W. Wong	
2001	The Young Ones	Uncle Nam	
2001	Snake Monster		
2006	Bet to Basic		
2008	Memoirs of the Last Samurai's Geisha		
2011	Punished		
2014	Flirting in the Air	Master Hua	
2015	Super Models		

=== TV series ===
Year	Title
2000	Showbiz Tycoon
2001	To Where He Belongs
