= Simply Ordinary =

1998 Hong Kong martial arts television series

- Official poster
- 林世榮
- Genre: Martial arts Period drama
- Written by: Sit Ka-wah
- Starring: Gordon Lam; Kenix Kwok; Yung Kam-cheung; Jay Lau; King Kong Lam; Chor Yuen
- Theme music composer: Kong Kong-sang
- Opening theme: Luck Will Come One Day (有日會行運) by Hacken Lee
- Country of origin: Hong Kong
- Original language: Cantonese
- No. of episodes: 15 (Hong Kong); 20 (Overseas)

Production
- Producer: Tsui Ching-hong
- Production location: Hong Kong
- Production company: TVB

Original release
- Network: TVB Jade
- Release: 7 September – 25 September 1998

Simply Ordinary
- Traditional Chinese: 林世榮
- Simplified Chinese: 林世荣
- Literal meaning: "Lam Sai-wing"
Transcriptions
Standard Mandarin
- Hanyu Pinyin: Lín Shì Róng
Yue: Cantonese
- Jyutping: Lam4 Sai3 Wing4

Simply Ordinary is a 1998 Hong Kong martial arts television series produced by TVB and stars Gordon Lam as famed martial artist Lam Sai-wing, who was also a known disciple of folk hero Wong Fei-hung. The series tells a largely fictional story of Lam before he became Wong's disciple.

== Plot ==
Lam Sai-wing (Gordon Lam) was an honest butcher who had great butchering skills. He was very popular among his fellow villagers and was later nominated as the village headman. Wing met Mary (Jay Lau), who came back from abroad, and wanted to pursue her. However, Mary actually wanted to use Wing to help her father to smuggle national treasures to abroad. Wing's cousin Tai (Kenix Kwok) knew about this fraud and warned him. Wing could not tell between truths and lies and was stuck between wealth, fame and love.

== Cast ==
- Gordon Lam as Lam Sai-wing (林世榮)
- Kenix Kwok as Kam Nga-tai (金亞娣)
- Yung Kam-cheung as Shek Sai-fung (石細鳳)
- Jay Lau as Mary Chu (朱瑪莉)
- King Kong Lam as Kam Nga-wong (金亞旺)
- Chor Yuen as Village Head Lo (魯保長)
- Cheung Kwok-keung as Ho Ka-po (何家保)
- Teresa Ha as Shum Yu (沈魚)
- Wong Ching as Ho Tai (何戴)

== See also ==
- The Return of Wong Fei Hung, a 1984 television series also produced by TVB which also tells the story of Lam Sai-wing.
- Magnificent Butcher, a 1979 film which also tells the story of Lam Sai-wing.
- List of TVB series (1998)
