= Wong Kei-ying =

Chinese martial artist and physician

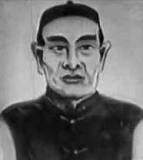
- Painting of Wong Kei-ying
- Born: 1815; Luzhou Hamlet, Lingxi Village, Xiqiao Country, Foshan town, Nanhai County, Guangzhou Prefecture, Guangdong, China
- Died: 1886 (aged 70–71); Guangzhou Prefecture, Guangdong, China
- Native name: 黄麒英
- Nationality: Chinese
- Style: Chinese martial arts Hung Ga
- Teacher: Luk Ah-choi

Other information
- Occupation: Martial artist, physician
- Spouse: Pok Lai-ngor
- Children: Wong Fei-hung (son)
- Notable relatives: Wong Chun-kong (father)
- Notable students: Wong Fei-hung

Chinese name
- Traditional Chinese: 黃麒英
- Simplified Chinese: 黄麒英
Transcriptions
Standard Mandarin
- Hanyu Pinyin: Huáng Qíyīng
- Wade–Giles: Huang Ch'i-ying
Yue: Cantonese
- Jyutping: Wong^{4} Kei^{4}-jing^{1}

Wong Kei-ying or Huang Qiying (c. 1815–1886) was a Chinese Hung Ga martial artist and physician of Cantonese ancestry. He was one of the Ten Tigers of Canton and was best known for his use of the Tiger Crane Paired Form Fist skill set. His son, Wong Fei-hung, who inherited his martial arts and medical skills, is commonly portrayed as a folk hero in Chinese popular culture.

== Life ==
Wong was born in Luzhou Hamlet, Lingxi Village, Xiqiao Country, Foshan Town, Nanhai County, Guangzhou Prefecture, Guangdong Province, which is now part of Xiqiao Town, Nanhai District, Foshan City, during the reign of the Jiaqing Emperor. His date of birth is not known. Since his son, Wong Fei-hung, lived from 1847 to 1924, his year of birth was estimated to be between 1810 and 1820.

In his younger days, Wong earned a living by performing martial arts and acrobatics in the streets. One day, he encountered Luk Ah-choi (陸阿采; Lu A'cai), a notable practitioner of the martial art Hung Ga. Luk was also a student of Reverend Jee-sin, one of the legendary Five Elders who survived the destruction of Shaolin Monastery by the Qing government in the 17th or 18th century. Luk saw great potential in the young Wong, accepted him as an apprentice, and taught him martial arts. Another legend, which reflects historicity in the Hung Ga lineage, says that Wong learnt martial arts from his father, Wong Chun-kong (黃鎮江; ca. 1782–1867), also named as Wong Tai (黃泰), who was taught by Luk Ah-choi.

Wong spent ten years training and mastering all the skills he learnt, including the Single Hard Fist, Double Hard Fist, Taming the Tiger Fist, Mother and Son Butterfly Knives, Angry Tiger Fist, Fifth Brother Eight Trigram Pole, Flying Hook, Black Tiger Fist, and the well-known Tiger and Crane Paired Form Fist. Once his training was complete, Wong joined the Black Flag Army and became its martial arts instructor. However, as his wages were too low, he also opened a herbal medicine dispensary, Po Chi Lam (寶芝林), to earn additional income to support his wife Pok Lai-ngor (樸麗娥) and family.

Wong was named one of the Ten Tigers of Canton, a group of the ten most famous martial artists in Guangzhou (Canton) in the 19th century. His martial arts and medical skills were inherited by his son, Wong Fei-hung, who also became a famous martial artist and physician in his own right.

== In popular culture ==
In the 1976 Shaw Brothers film Challenge of the Masters, he was portrayed by Yang Chiang.

In the 1978 film Ten Tigers of Shaolin (廣東十虎) produced by Mei Lam Film Production Company, he was portrayed by Wong Yuen-san.

In the many films about Wong Fei-hung, Wong Kei-ying had a more prominent screen presence in 1978 film Drunken Master, who was portrayed by Lam Kau.

In the 1979 film Ten Tigers from Kwangtung (廣東十虎與後五虎) produced by the Shaw Brothers Studio, he was portrayed by Wai Pak.

In the 1981 Shaw Brothers film Martial Club, he was portrayed by Ku Feng.

In the 1986 film Millionaires Express, he was portrayed by Jimmy Wang Yu.

In the 1993 films Once Upon a Time in China III and Once Upon a Time in China IV, despite his death in 1886, Wong Kei-ying, being portrayed by Lau Shun, appeared as a supporting character with little screen time due to the real-life events that happened during Wong Fei-hung's lifetime.

However the 1993 film Iron Monkey is a fictional depiction of the relationship between Wong Kei-ying and a ten-year-old Wong Fei-hung. It hints at how the younger Wong is shaped by the example of his father. He was portrayed by Donnie Yen.

In the 1994 films Drunken Master II and Drunken Master III, he was portrayed by Ti Lung and Adam Cheng respectively.

In the 1995 ATV and TVB television drama series Wong Fei Hung Series, he was again portrayed by Lau Shun.

In the 1999 ATV television drama series Ten Tigers of Guangdong (英雄之廣東十虎), he was portrayed by Eddy Ko.

In the 2002 television series The Young Wong Fei Hung, he was portrayed by He Zhonghua.

In the 2004 TVB television drama series Wong Fei Hung – Master of Kung Fu, he was portrayed by David Chiang.

In the 2014 film Rise of the Legend, he was portrayed by Tony Leung Ka-fai.

He was also shown as the main protagonist depicted as a young man in his youth in the 2017 TV movie, Master of the Shadowless Kick: Wong Kei-ying, which aired on HBO Asia. He was portrayed by Sun Hao Ran.

In the series of comic books Atomic Robo he is a member of a team of adventurers along with Nikola Tesla, Annie Oakley and Harry Houdini.
