= Iron rings =

Metal rings used in martial arts

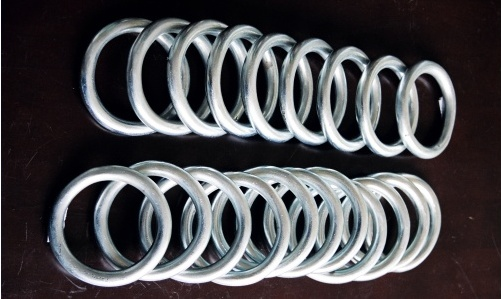
Ziranmen rings.

Iron rings are heavy metal rings used in martial arts for various training purposes. Metal rings have a long history of being used in Yau Kung Mun, Hung Gar, Ziranmen and other styles for weight training, to harden the muscle, skin, or bone, or strengthen the arms and fists.

== Types of rings ==
Many different types of rings are available. The Chi Sau Ring is used for conditioning the body in many stances, and exercises. Four-inch-diameter (100 mm) Chi Sau Rings weigh 600 g; 5-inch-diameter (130 mm) iron rings weigh 800 g. Some iron rings are sold in sets, such as two small and two large rings. Some rings are made of other metals such as steel or brass, and rattan rings are also used for exercise.

== Use in martial arts ==
Chinese forms training is done to improve the mind and body. To get the most out of your forms training, martial arts practitioner and writer Stefan Verstappen suggests that forms training be done with “brass or steel rings ...around the wrists and ankles to add weight during the performance of the form.” Verstappen states that “[s]pecial wrist and ankle weights can help in the development of muscles, and endurance. Light dumb bells can also be substituted." He warns that people doing training should "...be careful not to perform the movements too quickly since the weights tend to make you overextend your techniques which can cause injury to the joints.” Other ways of enhancing the value of forms training include training outdoors in varied conditions and using varying speeds. Ying Ching Kuen and external forms of Yau Kung Mun are practised with iron rings to build strength, power, and endurance.

The southern Chinese kung fu style of Hung Gar is "hard, strong style" that uses "rooted stances such as the horse stance (mabu)". Hung Gar practitioners use "...sand bags to strengthen grip, as well as iron rings in strengthening arms and tight fists." Hung Gar is derived from the Shaolin Temple kung fu system developed during the Ching dynasty. Hung Gar training uses "...prolonged stance training and many isometric breathing exercises. To do fist training, students wear iron rings, weighing from 2-4 lbs on their arms. "The force of the student's strike causes the rings to slide down the arms smashing into the back of the hands, reminding the students to hold a "tight fist.""

== In martial arts films ==
- In the opening scene of The 36th Chamber of Shaolin (1978), Gordon Liu practices the Hung Gar form "Tien Sin Kuen" or "Iron Wire Form" using iron rings.
- In the movie Drunken Master (1978), actor Jackie Chan used iron rings while practicing the horse stance.
- The movie Crippled Avengers (1978) (also known as The Return of the 5 Deadly Venoms) Dao Chang (Lu Feng) depicts the use of iron rings for sparring and fighting.
- In the movie Kung Fu Hustle (2004), iron rings were used by actor Chiu Chi Ling (a master of Hung Gar), who played the role of an effeminate tailor who specializes in fighting with iron rings.
- In the Marvel Cinematic Universe (MCU) film Shang-Chi and the Legend of the Ten Rings (2021), the Ten Rings are depicted as mystical iron rings as opposed to rings worn on the fingers in the comics. The Ten Rings was later integrated into mainstream Marvel Universe.
