= YKM =

YKM may refer to:

- Yau Kung Moon, a Chinese martial art
- Yakima Air Terminal, Washington, United States (IATA:YKM)
