= Chan Hon-chung =

- Born: 1909; Hingning, Guangdong, Qing Empire
- Died: March 1991 (aged 81–82); British Hong Kong
- Native name: 陳漢宗
- Style: Chinese martial arts Hung Ga
- Teacher: Lam Sai-wing
- Rank: Grandmaster

Other information
- Occupation: martial artist; former producer; former choreographer; former actor
- Notable club: Hong Kong Chinese Martial Arts Association

Chinese name
- Traditional Chinese: 陳漢宗
- Simplified Chinese: 陈汉宗
Transcriptions
Standard Mandarin
- Hanyu Pinyin: Chén Hànzōng

Chan Hon-chung (1909 – March 1991) was a Hung Ga Grandmaster, former producer, choreographer and actor. He was a student of the Chinese martial artist Lam Sai-wing. He was also the founding chairman of the Hong Kong Chinese Martial Arts Association, the most important Chinese martial arts association in Hong Kong.

== Early life ==
Chan was born in 1909 in Hingning, Guangdong. At the age of 19, he arrived in Hong Kong to participate in martial arts training under Lam Sai-wing.

After many years of training, Chan has finally established his own school, the Hon Chung Gymnasium in 1938.

Before setting up his own school, he has helped the Chinese army in Shun Teh county to train army and swordsmen to fight against Japanese invasion in 1936.

Chan entered the entertainment industry in the late 1940s to 1950s and worked as producer, choreographer and actor in the making of his sigung Wong Fei-hung film series which starred Kwan Tak-hing in the titular role .

== Hong Kong Chinese Martial Arts Society ==
In 1969, a group of Chinese martial artists came to Hong Kong from Singapore to discuss holding a Southeast Asia Chinese martial arts competition. The leader of the Singapore group suggested Hong Kong should have an association to coordinate and expand the Chinese martial arts community. Every style and school of Kung Fu agreed it was a good idea and Chan was elected as the chairman of the association.

Chan was awarded a medal by Queen Elizabeth II in 1973 for his leadership and contribution to the Chinese martial arts community. He was the only Chinese martial artist honored by the Queen during colonial Hong Kong.

== Incident ==
The chairman single-handedly fought off four young armed robbers.

Late on Chinese New Year's Eve in 1973, Chan and his wife were closing their tailor shop when four armed robbers entered the premises. Chan intervened to protect his wife, confronting the intruders. Despite sustaining a minor injury to his abdomen, Chan managed to fend off the attackers, who fled the scene.

== Death ==
Chan continued to lead the Hong Kong Chinese Martial Arts Association until he died in 1991.
