= Xiqiao =

Xiqiao may refer to:

- Xiqiao, Foshan (西樵镇), town in Nanhai District, Foshan, Guangdong, China
- Xiqiao, Huai'an (席桥镇), town in Chuzhou District, Huai'an, Jiangsu, China
- Mount Xiqiao, a dormant volcano in Nanhai District, Foshan, Guangdong, China
