= Chiu Chi-ling =

Hong Kong actor

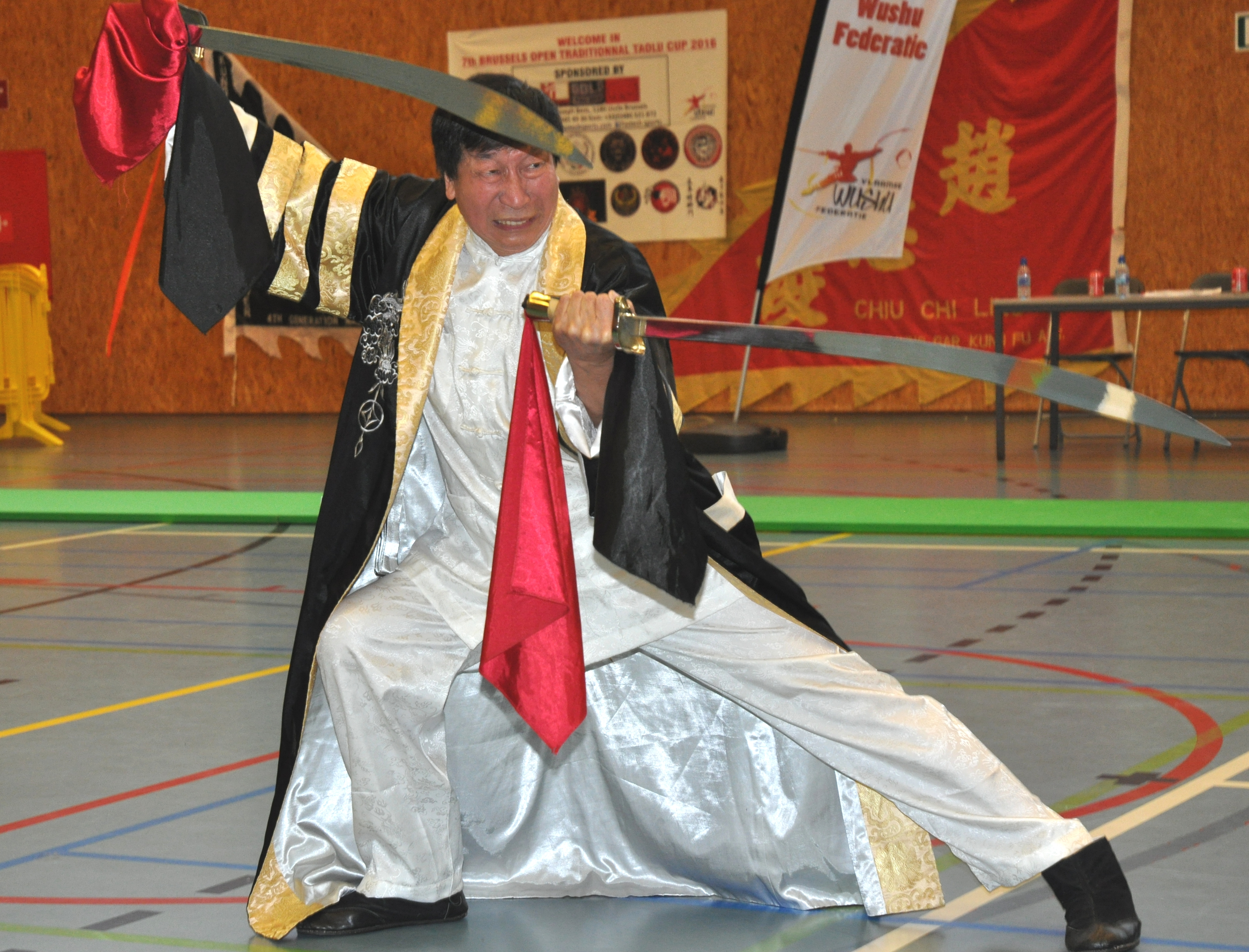
- Chiu in 2016
- Born: 1943 (age 82–83); Hong Kong
- Occupations: Actor, martial arts teacher
- Years active: 1978–present

Chinese name
- Traditional Chinese: 趙志淩
- Simplified Chinese: 赵志凌
Transcriptions
Standard Mandarin
- Hanyu Pinyin: Zhào Zhìlíng
Yue: Cantonese
- Jyutping: Ziu6 Zi3ling4

Chiu Chi-ling (Chinese: 趙志淩; Jyutping: ziu^{6} zi^{3} ling^{4}; born 1943) is a Hong Kong martial artist and actor. He also teaches Hung Gar Kung Fu at Chiu Chi-ling Hung Gar Kung Fu Association, a San Francisco-based martial arts school he founded, and at the old Chiu Family Kwoon in Hong Kong rooted under the lineage of Lam Sai-wing. Every year he visits his students and grand students around the world and organizes worldwide Kung Fu tournaments. The Kung Fu style he is part of was passed down directly from southern shaolin temple and carries names like Hung Hei-gun and Wong Fei-hung.

He has appeared in over 70 movies, both as an actor and stunt man. His abilities as an actor and martial arts practitioner has allowed him to work with most of the top Hong Kong film makers including Bruce Li, Jackie Chan, Chow Yun-fat and Stephen Chow.

He started practising Hung Gar Kung Fu when he was six years old under the tutelage of his father Chiu Kau (who won with the famous tiger-crane set over the whole of China in his sixties) and mother Chiu Shiu-ying, who were renowned for their solid Hung Gar. They were also both well-known doctors and Chiu learned from his father, beside the art of Kung Fu, the art of bone setting (Dit-Da).

In the early 1970s, he opened a school which attracted many celebrities, athletes and performers. This exposure to the entertainment industry gave him his start in acting. He has appeared in such well-known Kung Fu style movies as Snake in the Eagle's Shadow, Duel of the Seven Tigers, the comic smash-hit Kung Fu Hustle, Journey to the West: Conquering the Demons. Adventures of Power and The Mermaid. Chiu Chu-ling has also appeared in Tiger and Crane Shaolin Kung Fu demonstrating the techniques from shaolin tiger and crane.

He currently resides in Alameda, California.
