= The Return of Wong Fei Hung =

Hong Kong martial arts television series

- VCD cover
- 寶芝林
- Genre: Martial Arts; Action
- Written by: Wu Sa; To Leung-tai; Wong Ka-wai; Tsui Tat-cho
- Directed by: Lau Sze-yu; Siu Kin-hang; Wong Kam-ting; Chan Hung-kai
- Starring: Andy Lau; Stephen Tung; Kent Tong; Yammie Lam; Lau Kong; Liu Wai-hung
- Theme music composer: Joseph Koo
- Opening theme: Brave and Fearless (勇者無懼) by Cheung Ming-man
- Ending theme: A Ray of Love (一縷情) by Sara Lee
- Composer: Joseph Koo
- Country of origin: Hong Kong
- Original language: Cantonese
- No. of episodes: 20

Production
- Producer: Yau Ka-hung
- Production location: Hong Kong
- Camera setup: Multi camera
- Production company: TVB

Original release
- Network: TVB Jade
- Release: 15 October – 9 November 1984

The Return of Wong Fei Hung
- Traditional Chinese: 寶芝林
- Simplified Chinese: 宝芝林
- Literal meaning: "Po Chi Lam"
Transcriptions
Standard Mandarin
- Hanyu Pinyin: Bǎo Zhī Lín
Yue: Cantonese
- Jyutping: Bou2 Zi1 Lam2

The Return of Wong Fei Hung is a 1984 Hong Kong martial arts television series produced by TVB and starring Andy Lau. Despite Wong Fei-hung being part of the English title, Wong is only a supporting character in the series while the protagonist is his famed disciple Lam Sai-wing, portrayed by Lau. The Cantonese title is "Po Chi Lam" (Chinese: 寶芝林; 宝芝林; Bǎo Zhī Lín), the name of Wong's famed medicine clinic.

== Plot ==
Lam Sai-wing (Andy Lau), a butcher who makes a living with his older sister by selling pork in Guangzhou. He and his childhood friend Au-yeung Ching-ching (Yammie Lam) go on to develop romantic feelings for one another. Later Sai-wing also meets Leung Foon (Stephen Tung), Buckteeth So (Liu Wai-hung), Wong Chun-yee (Joseph Lee) and Wong's father: Grandmaster Wong Fei-hung (Lau Kong). As a martial arts fanatic, Sai-wing have always idolized Master Wong and together with So and Foon, Sai-wing decides to formally be Wong's apprentice.

After becoming Wong's apprentice, Sai-wing becomes indulged with martial arts and neglects Ching-ching. At this time, Ching-ching also meets a talented man named Nap-lan Ching-tak (Kent Tong) and they two of them fall in love. When Sai-wing tries to confess his love to Ching-ching once again, it was already too late since Ching has decided to marry Ching-tak. After some twist and turns, Sai-wing finally touches Ching-ching's heart with his sincerity but also attracting the jealousy and hatred of Ching-tak. At this time, Ching-tak plans to exact revenge on Sai-wing and the people around him.

== Cast ==
- Andy Lau as Lam Sai-wing (林世榮), nicknamed Porky Wing (豬肉榮) due to his occupation as a pork butcher, a martial arts fanatic and prodigy who was initially trained by his father, but when his father was killed in a fight because of his poor temper, Sai-wing's blind elder sister, Sai-yuk, forbidden him to practice martial arts, not wanting him to follow their father's footstep. When Wong Fei-hung notices Sai-wing's talent, Wong manages to convince his sister to allow Sai-wing to become his disciple.
- Stephen Tung as Leung Foon (梁寬), the lead coach of Sanshui's local militia who moves Guangzhou to live with his uncle, Kwai and becomes friends with Sai-wing. He is a talented martial artist, but is arrogant and Wong initially denied his request to take him as a disciple, but after Foon learns his lesson after being framed for murder, Wong officially accepts him.
- Kent Tong as Nap-lan Ching-tak (納蘭正德), the son of a rich Manchurian businessman from Guangxi who is multi-talented in literature, music and martial arts. He falls in love with Sai-wing's childhood sweetheart Ching-ching and marries her, but is still very jealous of Sai-wing to the point he tries to kill to latter.
- Yammie Lam as Au-yeung Ching-ching (歐陽菁菁), Sai-wing's childhood sweetheart who is the daughter of a fallen official. Despite her love for Sai-wing, he often neglects her in favor for martial arts and ends up marrying Nap-lan to help her family out of poverty.
- Lau Kong as Wong Fei-hung (黃飛鴻), a well-respected grand master of Hung Ga Kung Fu and physician who owns the clinic, Po Chi Lam (寶芝林). Honorable and benevolent, Wong often solves problem using virtue even when dealing with rivals.
- Liu Wai-hung as So Sai-choi (蘇世財), nicknamed Buckteeth So (牙擦蘇), Wong's disciple and a good friend of Sai-wing, Foon and Chun-yee. He is not very talented in martial arts, but is smart and very loyal.
- Yeung Chak-lam as Tuen Pa-tin (段霸天), the assistant of General Lau who schemes with the French to sell his country. He is Nap-lan's martial arts mentor and uses him to accomplish his scheme.
- Mo-Lin Yu
- Law Chun-piu
- Ko Miu-sze as Lam Sai-yuk (林世玉), Sai-wing's blind elder sister who initially disapproves her brother practicing martial arts due to their father's death but eventually decides to let him pursue his passions.
- Lai Pik-kwong
- Joseph Lee as Wong Chun-yee (黃俊義), the son of Wong Fei-hung and good friends with Sai-wing, Foon and So. He is impulsive and often gets into trouble which his father resolves.
- Mak Chi-wan as a disciple of Shek.
- Yu Tin-wai as a disciple of Shek.
- Tang Yu-chiu
- Chan Yau-hau as Uncle Kwai (貴叔), Foon's uncle who is a paper crafter and suffers from hard of hearing.
- Lau Suk-yee as Chan Ying (陳英), the owner of the Zhizha shop where Uncle Kwai works. She is initially displeased with Foon and often bickers with him, but they later become a couple.
- Chu Kong
- Kwan Kin
- Ho Kwai-lam
- Chu Tit-wo as Shek Chun-ngok (石震岳), Wong's rival who is a martial arts master and owner of Chun Wai Martial Arts Studio (震威武館) and often provokes Wong and his disciples. He is also Tuen's nephew and assists his uncle in his treason scheme.
- Tsui Kwong-lam as Pighead Wai (豬頭威), Sai-wing's friend who is a fellow meat butcher and martial artist known as the "Street Market King Boxer" (街市拳王).
- Ma Hing-sang
- Fong Wai-ming
- Ling Lai-man
- Shek Chung-yuk
- Au Ngok
- Cho Chai
- Lee To-yeung
- Tam Yat-ching
- Shek Ngai-wan
- Cheung Man-kwong
- Ng Pok-kwan
- Ng Wai-san
- Cheng Fan-sang
- Lo Kwok-wai
- Leung Siu-chau
- Leung Hung
- Leung Kit-fong
- Lo Lai-kuen
- Pak Lan
- Sheung-kwun Yuk as Mrs. Au-yeung (歐陽夫人), née Lam (林), Ching-ching's mother who disapproves her daughter's relationship with Sai-wing due to the latter's low social status.
- Chan On-ying as Lan (阿蘭), Ching-ching's loyal maid who fancies So
- Pui Wan
- Chan Ka-pik
- Chun Hung
- Lee Wan-kwong
- Cheung Chi-keung
- Kwan Cheuk-yuen
- Bak Man-biu
- Chan Chung-kin
- Suen Kwai-hing
- Ho Kwong-lun
- Fok Kit-ching
- Hui Yat-wah
- Amy Hu
- Ma Wai-ling
- Wong Chi-wai
- Carrie Ng
- Mui Lan
- Chan Ka-yin
- Ng Yip-kwong
- Felix Lok as a doctor who treats Ching-ching.
- Tam Chuen-hing as Luk Ching-kong (陸正剛), Wong's eldest disciple.
- Tony Leung
- Wong Chung-chi
- Ho Pik-kin
- Lau Wai-hoi
- Wong Cho-see
- Hung Tung-leung
- Tsang Cho-lam
- Lai Siu-fong
- Leung Chi-wah
- Yip Lai-ha
- Chan Tik-hak as Master Hung (雄少), a powerful and feared criminal boss in Hong Kong.
- Poon Wai-leung
- Ho Lai-nam
- Danny Poon
- Lam Man-wai
- Yu Ming
- Chi Pui-fan
- Chan Yuk-lun
- Yeung Chi-to
- Lau Kwok-sing
- Mak Ho-wai as a soldier under General Lau Wing-fuk.
- Kong Chi-sam
- Fung Kwok
- Chu Pik-man
- Wong Hoi-kwan
- Antonio Bastos Tony
- Chan Yiu-keung
- Fong Chau
- Wong To-lam
- Tsui Kwok-keung

== See also ==
- Andy Lau filmography
- Wong Fei-hung filmography
