= Shadowless kick =

Hung Gar martial arts kicking technique

The shadowless kick (Chinese: 無影腳; pinyin: wúyǐngjiǎo), also known as the no-shadow kick or ghost-shadow kick, is a martial arts kicking technique in the Hung Gar repertoire. It was made famous by Chinese folk hero Wong Fei-hung, who is reputed to have used it to great effect.

== In fiction ==
The shadowless kick or no shadow kick has often been depicted in fiction. Frequently it is presented as a simple but blindingly fast kick, in which the upper body, head and arms remain stationary whilst the kick is performed leaving the opponent unaware of the incoming strike until after it has been performed.

Other fictional depictions of the shadowless kick show it as a chain of kicks where the attacker strikes his target many times before landing.

== In modern practice ==
The shadowless kick is somewhat more mundane in modern practice. In practice it consists of a simultaneous grapple or distraction with the hands and a low kick. The upper body movement caused by the hands draws the attention of the target up and away from the feet which lash out at a target between the stomach and the knee. The combination of the low target area of the kick, the close range of the strike (which should be conducted from within hand strike / grapple range) and the use of diversionary technique lends it the appearance of supreme speed which the technique has become famous for. It is also the key component to learning how to perform a double or even triple strike consistently, surprising your opponent with its power and effect.

== In Wing Chun (Yong Chun) ==
The shadowless kick is derived by the martial artist kicking without the opponent being aware of it. The kick used is predominantly the front kick. This is done using three elements:

1. The martial artist does not change elevation while the kick is executed.
2. The kick is not telegraphed before and during its execution, by the martial artist masking their intent. This can be accomplished by distractions such as a simultaneous attack, or by using advanced techniques to make the target believe a different attack is being used or by tempo and attitude changes.
3. Extreme speed is used by the martial artist – by perfecting their relaxation skills thereby allowing the kick to be sent unhindered by muscle – until the moment of contact, where the Wing Chun base posture, provides target → ground → target energy.
