= Lam Cho =

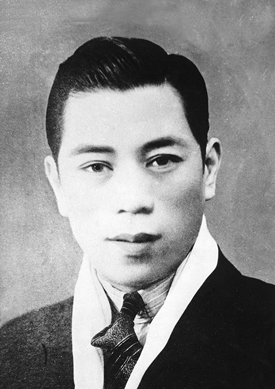
- Lam Cho in his younger days
- Born: February 27, 1910; Guicheng Subdistrict, Nanhai District, Foshan, Guangdong, Qing Empire
- Died: March 29, 2012 (aged 102); Hong Kong Baptist Hospital, Kowloon Tong, Hong Kong
- Native name: 林祖
- Other names: Lam Cho-kan (林祖根); Lam Gun-kau (林冠球)
- Style: Chinese martial arts Hung Ga
- Teacher: Lam Sai-wing
- Rank: Grandmaster

Other information
- Occupation: martial artist, Dit Da practitioner
- Spouse: Tam Yeut-ming (died 1979)
- Children: 6
- Notable relatives: Lam Sai-wing (uncle); Tang Kwok-wah (adopted son)
- Notable club: Lam Cho Martial Arts Association

Chinese name
- Chinese: 林祖
Transcriptions
Standard Mandarin
- Hanyu Pinyin: Lín Zǔ
Yue: Cantonese
- Jyutping: lam^{4} zou^{2}

Lam Cho (27 February 1910 – 29 March 2012) was the Hung Ga Grandmaster and Dit Da practitioner of the Lam Family Hung Ga lineage. He was noted to be the last martial arts Grandmaster who lived during the times of well-known martial artists Wong Fei-hung and Lam Sai-wing, his adoptive uncle.

== Background ==
Lam was born at Ping Chau village at Guicheng Subdistrict, Nanhai District of Foshan in Guangdong on 27 February 1910. At a young age he was orphaned and was adopted by his uncle Lam Sai-wing (林世榮), a disciple of the famous Hung Ga martial artist Wong Fei-hung.

Lam Cho was trained in Hung Ga by Sai-wing at the age of 6 and also practiced in Traditional Chinese medicine Dit Da. By the age of 16 he was already an established Hung Ga instructor in his own right and taught at his uncle's school Lam Sai-wing Martial Arts Association (林世榮國術團), and at Southern Martial Arts Athletic Association (南武體育會).

In 1928, Lam Sai-wing took him to Hong Kong, where they opened two branches of Lam Sai-wing Martial Arts Association and Dit Da clinics there. Sai-wing managed the First Branch with Cho as chief instructor, while the Second Branch was managed by Cho's fellow student Dang Hin-choi.

In 1931, Cho was invited to the British marine exercise event at Lufeng, Guangdong, to perform martial arts, and received praises from other participating martial artists. This was further reported on London Free Press. Later in about 1932, Cho taught his 8 year old adopted son Tang Kwok-wah (鄧國華) (1924–2011).

Like his uncle, Lam Cho had since become one of the most celebrated martial artists, and was often sought after for his skills and was invited to many important martial arts events.

In 1933, Cho took over the Second Branch and renamed it to Lam Cho Martial Arts Association (林祖國術社) with a new logo of Tiger and Crane insignia designed by his student Leung Wing-hang, replacing his uncle's former circular insignia logo which had Lam's Training Hall (林館) written inside of it. Thus the logo became a trademark of Lam Family Hung Kuen (林家洪拳) lineage.

Lam married Tam Yeut-ming (譚月明) at Hong Kong and his first son was born in 1940, his son's name was named Lam Chun-fai (林鎮輝) by his uncle Sai-wing.

During the World War II, Lam Cho was actively involved in the anti-Japanese resistance. During the Japanese occupation of Hong Kong, civil disorder among the people broke out in the streets and Lam stepped in to maintain peace. He was later recognised by the Japanese as a man with considerable influence over the local people and they tried to have him becoming a member to the local administration. Lam's repeated refusal resulted him being a wanted man and his school being burned. Lam had no choice and fled back to his hometown Ping Chau village at Nanhai District, later he discreetly taught martial arts at San Jou village.

After the Japanese surrendered in 1945, Lam moved his family back to Hong Kong and reopened his school and Dit Da clinic at the ground floor of the four storey building (present day Blue House) at Stone Nullah Lane in Wan Chai, the clinic where his uncle had presumably died in. There Lam trained his 5 year old first son Chun-fai along with others.

Lam would often been invited by many associations and companies to act as their martial arts consultant. He also became the chairman of the Physical Culture Association.

== Personal life ==
Lam married Tam Yeut-ming (譚月明) and their children were born from during the World War II to post-war early 1950s, they have four sons, namely, Anthony Lam Chun-fai (林鎮輝) (born 1940), Lam Chun-hin (林鎮顯), Simon Lam Chun-chung (林鎮忠) (born 19 October 1948) and Lam Chun-sing (林鎮成) (born 1952), and two daughters, Lam Fung-chan (林鳳珍) and Lam Fung-chu (林鳳珠) (born 1944). All his six children were trained by him and were established Hung Ga and Dit Da practitioners.

His son Anthony Lam would assist him as an instructor at the school before opening his own at North Point at the age of 18.

In 1963, Lam left the school and Dit Da clinic at Wan Chai to be managed by his second son Lam Chun-hin and his wife Luk Lai-yin (陸麗燕) to open another training school and Dit Da clinic at Nullah Road, Mong Kok in Kowloon.

Lam accepted the permission of his adopted son Tang Kwok-wah to open his own school in Hong Kong. Tang would later migrate to the United States in 1973 to open his school in Boston. Lam's fourth son Lam Chun-sing moved to Jordan to establish his own school and Dit Da clinic there for a year before ventured into business, but returned to Hong Kong in 1975 to train students at his father's studio in Mong Kok.

Lam's wife Yeut-ming died in 1979. His second son Chun-hin died in the 1980s, Chun-hin's wife Luk carries on with the Dit Da practice at Wan Chai.

== Later life ==
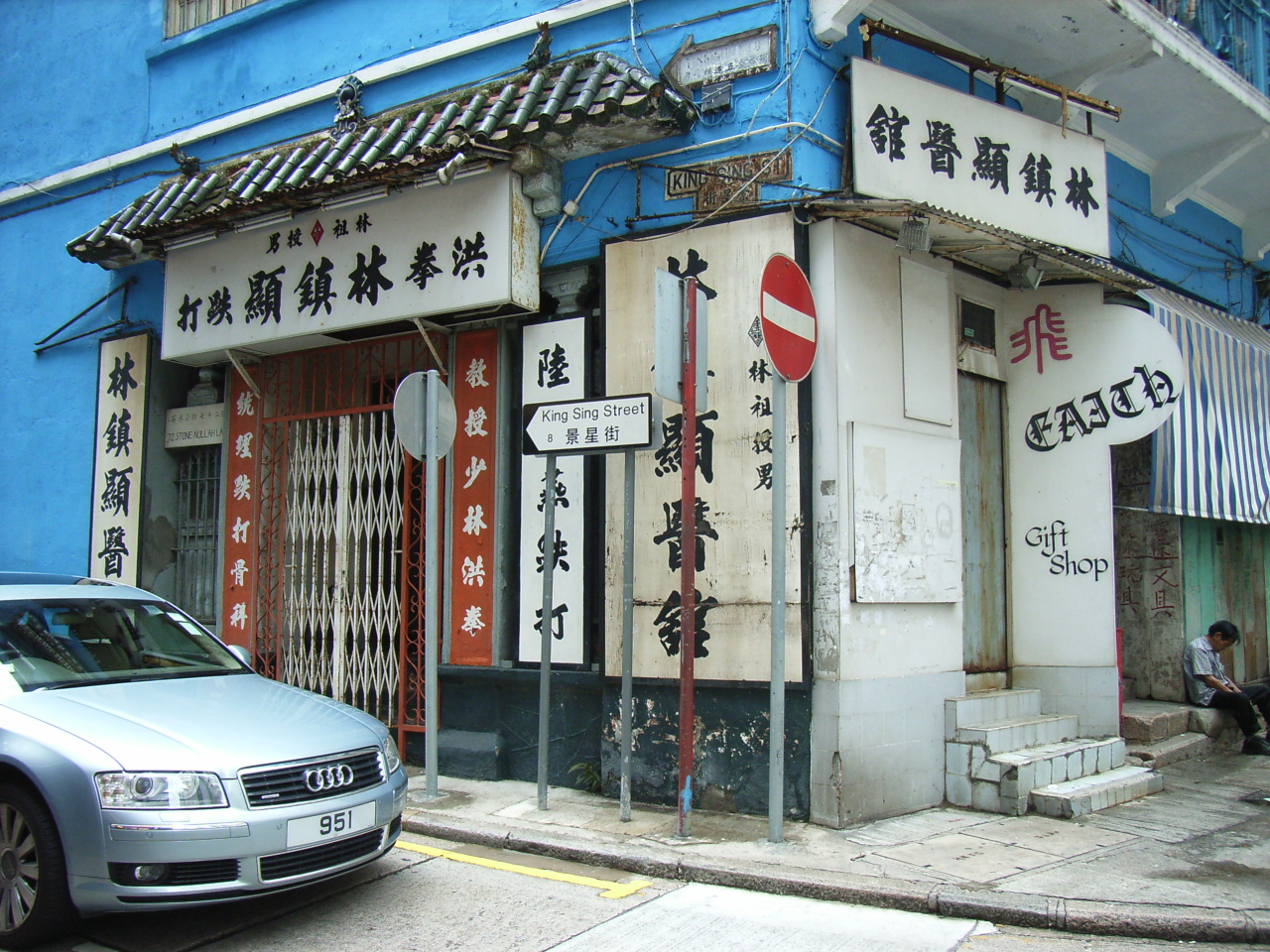
Lam Cho's former martial arts school at Blue House in 2006. Currently known as Lam Chun-hin Clinic (林鎮顯醫館) by his late son Lam Chun-hin (林鎮顯)

As well as his adopted son Tang, Lam's well-known senior students who eventually went overseas to promote Hung Ga were Kwong Tit Fu (鄺鐵夫; died 1999, Boston), Y.C. Wong (黃耀楨; San Francisco) and Buck Sam Kong (江北山; Kong's Siu Lum Pai Assn., Los Angeles).

Although Lam officially retired in the 1970s, he continued to practice his martial arts and treated patients at Mong Kok on a regular basis with assistance of his youngest daughter Lam Fung-chu.

In January 2008, Lam was invited to attend the Wong Fei-hung's 160th birthday anniversary commemorative ceremony in Nanhai as Hung Ga's most senior representative.

Soon after his 100th lunar birthday in March 2010, Lam suffered a stroke and was taken to Hong Kong Baptist Hospital at Kowloon Tong. His training school and Dit Da clinic in Mong Kok had been taken over by his third son Simon Lam and youngest daughter respectively. Meanwhile, his adopted son Tang Kwok-wah died in Quincy on 22 November 2011.

== Death ==
Lam died during his stay at the hospital on 29 March 2012, 2:15 pm (UTC+08:00), aged 102. His funeral wake was held at Universal Funeral (世界殯儀館) at Hung Hom in April 2012, and his students from all over the world returned to Hong Kong to mourn for his passing.

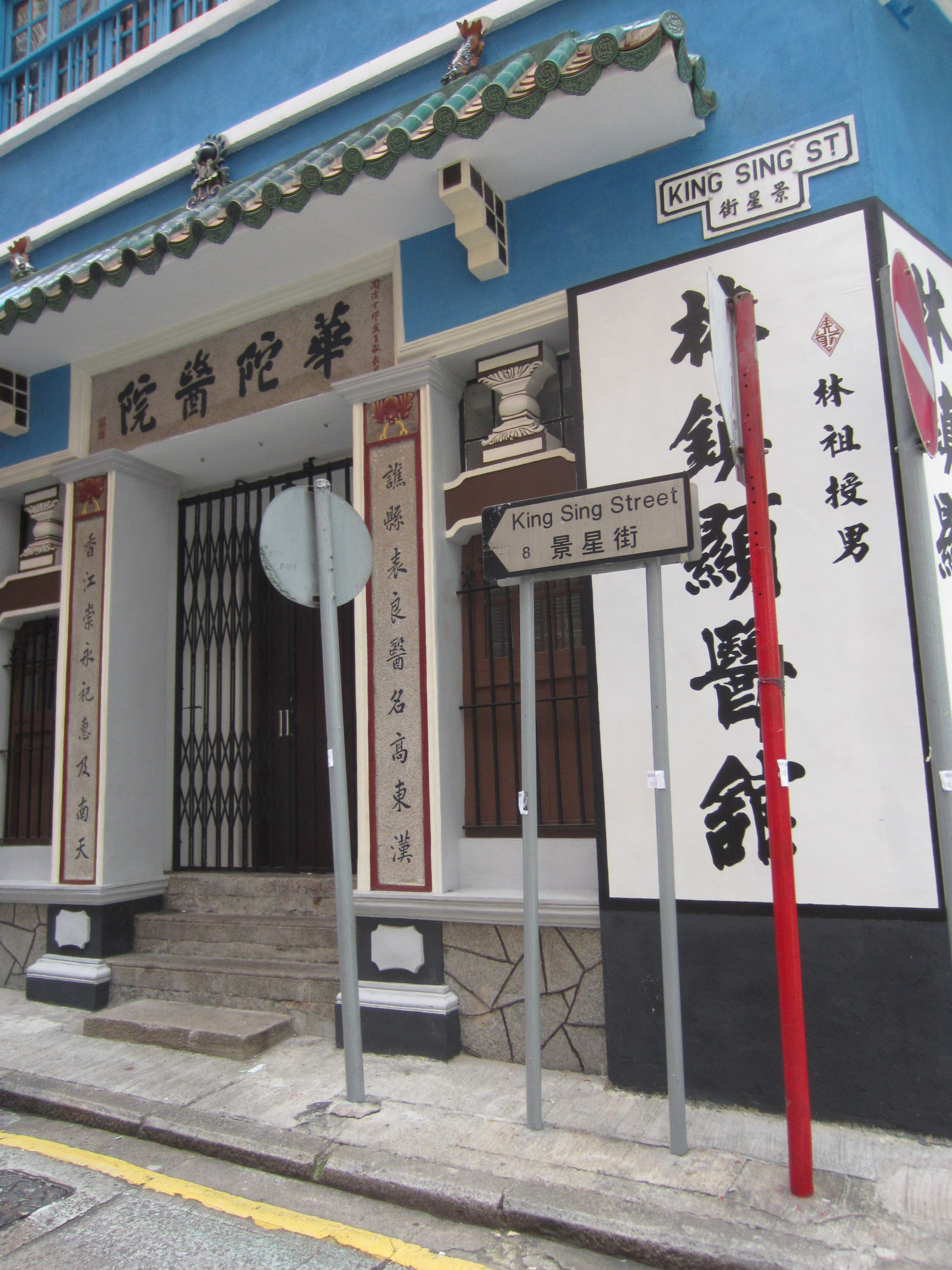
The fully renovated Lam Chun-hin Clinic at Blue House in 2017.
