= Dang Fong =

鄧芳 Dang Fong
- Born: 1877 or 1879; Saam Sui, Guangdong, China
- Died: 20 December 1955; British Hong Kong
- Style: 鄧式洪家拳; Dang Style Hung Ga Keun
- Teacher: 黃飛鴻 Wong Fei Hung

Dang Fong 鄧芳 (1877 or 1879–12/20/1955) was a disciple of the Chinese Kung Fu folk hero Wong Fei Hung. It is said that his rigid ways prompted him to follow and document the Hung Ga Kuen teachings of Wong Fei Hung to the letter, thus he was referred to as Old Square Mind for his stubbornness to tradition. This statement cannot be confirmed, but it can be confirmed that he was known as the Tiger of Sai Gwan.

== Life ==
Dang Fong was born in Sanshui, of Guangdung Province in China. His father Dang Biu was a famous practitioner of Tit Da and Chinese Kung Fu, and had a deep knowledge of Maau Saan (茅山）, Chinese folk Witchcraft. Dang Biu had killed people in combat during his younger years and thus refused to teach his son martial arts. As Dang Fong was stubborn in his request he did manage to learn the basics of self-defense from his father. In his youth he learned Chinese Tit Da (Chinese Orthopedics) from his father. When he grew up Dang Fong went to Guong Jau City to learn martial arts under Master Wong Yau, who had a school located in Cheung Sau Lane's Dak Sing Lane. He stayed under Wong's strict tutelage for more than 2 years before leaving to seek out a better teacher. Later, Dang Fong became a student of monk Sin Ling of the Wah Lum Temple. Dang believed Sin Ling to have a better method of teaching and devoted himself to learning with him. It was Sin Ling who taught Dang Fong the Left-handed Plum Flower Spear (Joh Sau Mui Fa Cheung), a weapon that he became very famous by.

Dang Fong originally began learning Hung Ga Kuen from Lam Sai Wing, the disciple of Wong Fei Hung. At that time Lam Sai Wing was teaching in Guangzhou's Chan Tong District. Dang Fong was popular and had many friends, two of which were Sui Lo Yuk and Sui Lo Yin, both students of Wong Fei Hung. They taught a lot of their kung fu to Dang and later introduced him to Wong Fei Hung to become an indoor disciple learning martial arts and Tit Da. He reported that Wong's teaching style was to teach students according to their abilities. For example, he taught Ling Wan Gai mainly the skills of the staff and Lam Sai Wing the skills of the fist and hand forms. When Wong Fei Hung saw Dang Fong perform the Left-handed Plum Flower Spear he saw a lot of potential, but for his own reasons focused Dang's training on Tit Da and herbal skills. As Dang Fong was determined to learn Kung Fu he would ask other students of Wong Fei Hung to teach him. He learned Fifth Brother Eight Trigram Staff (Ng Long Pah Kua Guang) from Ling Wan Gai, the Generals Broadsword (Ji Fai Do) from Lam Sai Wing, the Green Dragon Knife (Ching Lung Yan Yuet Do) from Chan Din Biu, etc. Then one day when Wong Fei Hung saw Dang Fong practicing the Green Dragon Knife, which he had never taught him, he realized his passion for learning and changed his focus to teaching Dang Fong his Hung Ga Kuen. Afterward with Wong's permission, Dang Fong opened a school in Yi Yung Tong, in Tai Ho Road of Sai Kwan District in Guangzhou. He invited Wong's wife Mok Gwai Lan to be the martial art and lion dancing trainer for female students, and the school became famous for male and female lion dancing. One day Dang Fong had a fight with a master named Yuen Hoi and defeated him. The fight gained him the name "Tiger of Sai Kwan". During the Lok Sin Theater incident, Dang Fong was one of the participants and injured many people and had to leave Guangzhou going to Southeast Asia. Dang Fong returned to China after the Ching Dynasty and after the Sino-Japanese war he moved to Hong Kong. In 1948, the Kowloon Jewelry Association and Hong Kong Fisher Market of the Eastern District invited Dang Fong to be their martial arts and lion dance teacher.

== Dang Style Hung Ga Kuen 鄧式洪家拳 ==
The Dang Fong branch of Hung Ga is somewhat unusual from other branches of Hung Ga Kuen under Wong Fei Hung in terms of substance and material. Even amongst Dang Fong lineage there is differences in what material is said to come from Dang Fong, etc.

- Gung Ji Fuk Fu Kuen (Subduing the Tiger in the "I" Pattern)
- Fu Hok Seung Ying Kuen (Tiger Crane Double Shape)
- Ng Ying Kuen (5 Animals Fist)
- Sup Ying Kuen (10 Shape/Animal Fist - no Elements )
- Tit Sin Kuen (Iron Wire Fist)
- Fu Pau Kuen (Tiger Panther Fist): created by Dang Fong
- Gau Ji Leen Waan Kuen (9 Links Continuous Fist): created by Dang Fong

- Ng Lun Baat Gwa Gwun (Fifth Brother Eight Trigram Pole)
- Ji Mo Seung Do (Mother Son Double Swords)
- Joh Sau Mui Fa Cheung ("Left-handed Plum Flower Spear")
- Ng Long Baat Gwa Cheung (Fifth Brother Eight Trigram Spear)
- Ching Lung Yan Yuet Dao ("Green Dragon Heaven Knife")
- Chuen Chao Dai Dao (Spring Autumn Great Knife)
- Yu Ga Daai Pa (Yu Family Tiger Fork)
- Ngau Gwat Sin (Beef Bone Fan)
- Moi Fa Tiu (Plum Flower Lance)
- Moi Fa Bin (Plum Flower Chain Whip)

== Legacy ==
Some well-known students of Dang Fong who went on to pass on his art include:

- Chau Wing Tak 周永德
- Lau Kai Tong 劉啟東
- Ho Lap Tin 何立天
- Yuen Ling 阮凌
