= Lam Sai-wing =

Chinese martial artist (1860–1943)

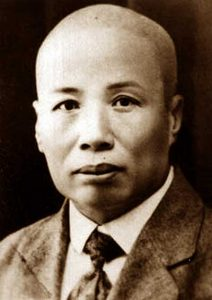
- Lam Sai-wing
- Born: 1860; Guicheng Subdistrict, Nanhai District, Foshan, Guangdong, Qing Empire
- Died: 1943 (aged 82–83); Hong Kong
- Native name: 林世榮
- Other names: Mr. Fu-Hok (虎鶴先生); Butcher Wing; Porky Wing (豬肉榮)
- Nationality: Chinese
- Style: Chinese martial arts Hung Ga
- Teachers: Lam Che-chung; Lam Bak-sin; Lam Geui-chung; Wu Kam-sing; Boxer Kang; Chung Hung-san; Wong Fei-hung

Other information
- Occupation: martial artist
- Notable relatives: Lam Cho (nephew)
- Notable students: Lam Cho; Raymond Chow; Chan Hon-chung

Chinese name
- Traditional Chinese: 林世榮
- Simplified Chinese: 林世荣
Transcriptions
Standard Mandarin
- Hanyu Pinyin: Lín Shìróng
Yue: Cantonese
- Jyutping: Lam^{4} Sai^{3}-wing^{4}

Lam Sai-wing (1860 – 1943) was a Hung Gar martial artist. He was a student of the Chinese martial artist, acupuncturist, and folk hero of Cantonese ethnicity, Wong Fei-hung.

"Since my young years till now, for 50 years, I have been learning from Masters. I am happy that I have earned the love of my tutors who passed on me the Shaolin Mastery…" (Lam Sai-wing).

== Early life ==
Lam was born in Nanhai district, Guangdong. He followed the customs of his ancestors and learned the traditional martial arts and traditional Chinese medicine Dit Da of his family; from his father Lam Che-chung, grandfather Lam Bak-sin and granduncle Lam Geui-chung, and progressed to learn from Wu Kam-sing (胡金星), a northern Chinese boxer known only by the surname of Kang (康), and Chung Hung-san (鍾雄山). He later learned from Wong Fei-hung, and also assisted with him to work as guards in the entertainment venues. He was eventually considered an expert in Hung Ga ("Hung family fist", a style originating from the Southern Shaolin Tiger style, known for its efficiency and widespread at the time in various secret societies), and may have also studied Fut Kuen ("Buddhist Fist", a style practiced by various Buddhist sects in Guangdong province).

He founded the Wu Ben Tang (Hall of Fundamental Study) in Guangzhou (Canton) where he taught his martial arts. Towards the end of the Qing dynasty, Lam gained first place at a large martial arts competition that took place at the Dongjiao ground.

Between 1917 and 1923, Lam served in the National Revolutionary Army of Fujian province as Chief Instructor in hand-to-hand combat. In 1921, his performance of Tiger Crane Paired Form Fist (虎鶴雙形拳) to raise fund for an orphanage in Guangdong won praise from Sun Yat-sen. Sun awarded him with a silver presidential medal and addressed him as Mr. Fuk-Hok (虎鶴先生).

In about 1926, he was invited by the Hong Kong Butchers' Association to teach martial arts. In 1928, Lam eventually moved to Hong Kong with his adopted nephew Lam Cho (林祖) (1910–2012), where he started teaching martial arts there. With the help of one of his disciples Chu Yu-zai, he wrote and published three books on the three primary forms (taolu) of Hung Ga: gung ji fuk fu keun ("Taming the Tiger Fist"), fu hok seung ying keun ("Tiger Crane Paired Form Fist"), and tit sin keun ("Iron Wire Fist").

== Death ==
According to most sources Lam died in 1943, aged 81/82/83. It is not known for certain where he died, but according to a biography of Lam Sai-wing published 1951 by Wong Man-kai, a student of Lam Sai-wing, he returned to his ancestral home Ping Jau village late in his years and also died there.

== Legacy ==
Lam and his students, which were said to have numbered over 10,000 during his life, are primarily responsible for popularizing the style in the 20th century. Some of his students became among the first actors and stunt people in the fledgling Hong Kong "kung fu" film industry in the 1940s. They included two men who would work as action directors on the Wong Fei-hung films that starred Kwan Tak-hing – Leong Wing-hang and Lau Cham, father of action director and star, Lau Kar-leung. Another student of Lam was Golden Harvest producer Raymond Chow.

The most famous student of Lam Sai-wing and the leader of the Hong Kong Martial Arts Community was Chan Hon-chung (1909–1991), the founding chairman of Hong Kong Chinese Martial arts association and the only Chinese Martial Artist honored by the Queen during the colonial Hong Kong. Chan's best student Kong Pui-wai is still leading the association. Another famous student was Chiu Kao. His son Chiu Chi-ling made his name from movies and teaching Hung Gar worldwide.

Lam Sai-wing's kung fu was also continued by his adopted nephew Lam Cho, his disciple and successor, who resided & taught in Hong Kong with his own sons Anthony Lam Chun-fai, Simon Lam Chun-chung and Lam Chun-sing. Simon Lam Chun-chung continues to teach his father's students and new students at Lam Cho's renowned studio in Mong Kok, Hong Kong. Among Lam Cho's senior disciples, Kwong Tit Fu (鄺鐵夫) (died 1999) and Tang Kwok-wah (鄧國華) (1924–2011) taught in Boston. Another Senior student YC Wong 黃耀楨 school in Sanfrancisco is being carried on by his sons.

Kwong's well-known student was Calvin Chin, while among Tang's disciples are Winchell Ping Chiu Woo (胡炳超) (Chiu Mo Kwoon, Boston), Yon Lee (李健遠) (Harvard Tai Chi Tiger Crane Shaolin Cultural Foundation, Shaolin Institute, Quincy). (Note: In 2007, Yon Lee was appointed International Shaolin Cultural Ambassador by the Municipal Government of Dengfeng (home to the Shaolin Temple) Henan Province, People's Republic of China. In collaboration with the Songshan Cultural Research Foundation of Dengfeng, Lee hosted an international conference focusing on kung fu and Shaolin medicine in 2010.) and Sik Y. Hum.

== Portrayal in the media ==
Lam had been portrayed by one of his students Lau Cham in many of the Wong Fei-hung films starring Kwan Tak-hing from 1949 to 1959.

He was portrayed by Ng Ming-choi in the 1979 film Butcher Wing.

He has been portrayed by Sammo Hung in the 1979 film Magnificent Butcher, which was also one of the many (over 100) films made about Wong Fei-hung starring Kwan Tak-hing.

Andy Lau portrayed Lam in the 1984 TVB series The Return of Wong Fei Hung, which featured Lam as the main protagonist.

In the 1991 film Once Upon a Time in China, Lam was portrayed by Kent Cheng, Lam was a butcher by trade, causing his name to be translated as "Porky" in the English version.

In the 1992 TVB television drama series Wong Fei Hung Returns, he was portrayed by Ram Chiang.

Kent Cheng reprised his role as Lam in the 1994 film Once Upon a Time in China V and the 1995 Chinese television series Wong Fei Hung Series.

In the 1998 TVB television drama series Simply Ordinary, he was portrayed by Gordon Lam.

In the 2002 television drama series The Young Wong Fei Hung, he was portrayed by Yang Ming.

He was portrayed by Dickson Li in the 2004 TVB television drama series Wong Fei Hung – Master of Kung Fu.

He was portrayed by Chen Chen as Butcher Wing in the two 2018 Wong Fei-hung films The Unity of Heroes and Warriors Of The Nation.
