= Wong Fei Hung – Master of Kung Fu =

- Poster
- 我師傅係黃飛鴻
- Genre: Period Action
- Starring: Bosco Wong; David Chiang; Rain Li; Cerina da Graca; Sammul Chan; Kenneth Ma
- Opening theme: "鴻飛萬里" by Alan Tam
- Country of origin: Hong Kong
- Original language: Cantonese
- No. of episodes: 25

Production
- Running time: 45 minutes (approx.)

Original release
- Network: TVB
- Release: January 10 – February 13, 2005

Wong Fei Hung – Master of Kung Fu (Traditional Chinese: 我師傅係黃飛鴻) (Wǒ shīfu shì Huáng Fēihóng) is a TVB costume action series released overseas in November 2004 and broadcast on TVB Jade in January 2005.

It was the first lead role for Hong Kong actor Bosco Wong.

== Synopsis ==
Wong Fei-hung (Bosco Wong) is a hotheaded youth with a fully developed sense of justice who is beginning to show the qualities of the famous hero he will become in the future. After his mother’s death, Fei-Hung has followed his father, Wong Kei-ying (David Chiang), formerly known as one of the "Guangdong Tiger", to earn a living by performing martial arts and selling medicine on the streets travelling from province to province, seemingly aimlessly. After many years they return to their home village in Fushan to pay their respects to Wong Fei-Hung's deceased mother.

Wong Kei-Ying is somewhat reluctant to return to Fushan and is eager to leave. Having previously lived a nomadic life, Fei-Hung was eager to stay and make some friends in Foshan. They meet up with Fei Hung's aunt Tang Yu-Bo (Winnie Young) who has just returned from France to open a western cafe. Yu-Bo helps Fei-Hung to convince his father to stay. So Kei-Ying and Fei-Hung's new life in Fushan begins...

== Cast ==
Cast	Role	Description
Bosco Wong	Wong Fei-hung 黃飛鴻	Wong Kei-Ying's son.
David Chiang	Wong Kei-ying 黃麒英	Wong Fei-Hung's father.
Rain Li (李彩樺)	Mok Kwai-lan 莫桂蘭	Mok Tin-Lung and Ng Dak-Han's daughter.
Cerina da Graca	Tai Siu Ting 戴小婷	
Sammul Chan	Leung Foon 梁寬	
Kenneth Ma	Gan Kin 簡堅	
Winnie Young (楊婉儀)	Tang Yu-Bo 鄧如寶	Wong Fei-Hung's aunt.
Gordon Liu	Mok Tin-Lung 莫天龍	Ng Dak-Han's husband. Mok Kwai-Lan's father.
Angelina Lo (盧宛茵)	Ng Dak-Han 吳德嫻	Mok Tin-Lung's wife. Mok Kwai-Lan's mother.
Power Chan	Dai Siu-Tin 戴嘯天	
Angela Tong		Dai Siu-Tin's wife.
Halina Tam	Luk Yuet-Ho 陸月好	
Michael Tong	Yu Kwong-Fai 余光輝	
Li Ka Sing (李家聲)	Lam Sai-wing 林世榮	
Kenny Wong (黃德斌)	Fung See-Lei 馮司理	
