= Characters of Xenogears =

Characters of Xenogears. From left to right: Bart, Citan, Fei, and Billy.

This is a list of notable characters from the video game Xenogears, a role-playing video game released in 1998 by Square Enix for the PlayStation video game console. Kunihiko Tanaka was lead character designer, while Tetsuya Takahashi and Masato Kato were lead writers. Xenogears was a commercial and critical success. Readers of Japanese gaming magazine Famitsu voted Xenogears the 16th best video game of all time in a 2006 poll.

Xenogears follows main protagonist Fei and his friends as they learn about Deus, a powerful, self-aware interplanetary invasion system that crashed onto the planet ten thousand years prior to the game's story. Deus has been secretly controlling the planet's gradually increasing population to one day bring about its own resurrection. Fei and Elly, the main protagonists, have been reincarnated throughout history to ensure that Deus never achieves its goal. Miang, the embodiment of Deus and the main antagonist, opposes Fei and Elly and has reincarnated several times to manipulate humanity's progress.

== Creation and development ==
The characters of Xenogears were designed to allude to psychological concepts, most notably of Freudian and Jungian psychology. One of Fei's incarnations is named after French psychoanalyst Jacques Lacan, but the most obvious allusion is that of Fei's Freudian id, ego and super-ego, which are discussed throughout the story. Fei subconsciously repressed his memories because of his torturous childhood, but his desire to remember his past eventually leads him to discover the truth about his identity and his relationship with Id. This repression also relates to the Jungian concept of the shadow. However, some character's actions are Adlerian in nature, such as Ramsus, whose actions are driven by an inferiority complex stemming from unconscious 'nodes' that often permeate exterior behaviors of an individual. Although not distinctly psychological, the game also contains allusions to the theories of Friedrich Nietzsche, such as the concept of the eternal return, which, in Xenogears, correlates to the recurrences of the Contact and the Antitype.

== Main protagonists ==
=== Fei Fong Wong ===
Voiced by: Hikaru Midorikawa

Fei Fong Wong (ウォン・フェイフォン, Won Fei Fon) is the game's protagonist, whose name alludes to the legendary Wong Fei Hung and is the same when written in katakana. By the game's beginning, Fei has lived in the village of Lahan for three years and has no memory of events prior to his arrival. It is soon revealed that Fei tends to lose control of himself when he feels fear or anger. When Lahan is attacked, he steps into the cockpit of an abandoned giant fighting robot to protect the town, but becomes responsible for destroying it. Afterwards, Fei joins forces with Citan Uzuki and other allies to uncover the web of deception and manipulation surrounding Solaris, and ultimately, Deus. Fei is a strong fighter and fights with his bare fists in battle, as well as with special techniques known as "Chi".

Fei experiences frequent periods of memory loss and unknowingly has a split personality called Id, which is the product of the pain and anguish he experienced when he was young. This pain split his mind into three personas: the monster Id, the childlike "coward", and the artificial persona Fei, who was designed to shield Id from reality. These personas were designed to correspond to the Freudian ideas of the id, ego and super-ego. When Fei was a child, Miang's spirit possessed his mother, who experimented on Fei, as he was the "Contact" and one of many reincarnations of Abel (アベル, Aberu), the sole survivor of the crash of the spaceship Eldridge thousands of years ago.

Fei's first incarnation, Abel, grew up along with the original Elehaym ten thousand years prior to the game's story; they were both killed in a rebellion against the world's ruler, Cain. The second Contact, Kim Kharim (キム・カーリム, Kimu Kārimu), appeared in the Zeboim era, four thousand years before the game's start. He was Emeralda's creator, although Miang destroyed his technology and he went into hiding afterwards. During the Solaris War, which took place five hundred years prior to the game's events, the Contact appeared as the painter Lacan (ラカン, Rakan). After joining the rebellion against Solaris, he met Krelian and Sophia, the corresponding incarnation of Elehaym. When Sophia was killed in battle, Lacan decided to destroy the world, turning into Grahf and freeing the Contact to be reincarnated again as Fei.

Fei has been called "a mystery for the player to follow and solve on their own" by IGN. Edge said of Fei that he "in some ways, conforms to the classic stereotypical lead character, but we quickly discover he's anything but a blank canvas. Within an hour of play Fei has leveled his home village in an act of brutal destruction, killing his best friends – who you were busily helping prepare for their wedding the next day."

The world of Xenogears was originally designed as more "pastoral" than the final result, and Lahan was planned to have a "martial arts" feel. As the game's script was written, this was changed, but the design of Fei, which was meant to fit in with the original conception, was not able to be revised in the time allotted and remained wearing a martial arts uniform. This led to director Tetsuya Takahashi feeling that his character design was out of place, especially in the latter half of the game. The version of Fei in Zeboim, Kim, was designed with a lab coat and modern Japanese clothing to demonstrate that Zeboim society was similar to modern society. Lacan was intended to have a different design than Fei, but due to time constraints, was instead left with the same artwork, which was justified with the idea that Lacan's memories were shared with Fei, who projected his own self-image into them.

=== Elhaym Van Houten ===
Elly in the Japanese instruction manual.

Voiced by: Yumi Tōma

Elhaym Van Houten (エレハイム・ヴァン・ホーテン, Erehaimu Van Hōten), nicknamed Elly (エリィ, Erii), is a young skilled officer of Gebler who meets Fei in the forest near Lahan Village. She was leading an operation to steal a top-secret experiment gear from Kislev, but was forced to crash-land in Lahan and was partially responsible for its destruction. Elly is optimistic and wants to help Fei, despite him being a land dweller and the fact she cannot leave the military. She is known as the -Antitype-, she has been reincarnated several times throughout history along with Fei, her previous incarnation being Sophia (ソフィア, Sofia), the Holy Mother of Nisan. She wields rods and can attack with elemental ether attacks.

=== Citan Uzuki ===
Voiced by: Hideyuki Tanaka

Citan Uzuki (シタン・ウヅキ, Shitan Uzuki) is a medical doctor who lives up the mountain path from Lahan with his wife Yui (ユイ), the granddaughter of the Shevat Guru Gaspar, and his daughter Midori (ミドリ). Despite living on the surface, Citan was born in Solaris, and his real name is Hyuga Ricdeau (ヒュウガ・リクドウ, Hyuuga Rikudou). He is a Solaris Guardian Angel, and is working under orders from the Solaris Emperor to observe Fei to see if he will bring relief or destruction to the world. Citan is intelligent and responsible for the development of many Gears. He has a history with multiple individuals, including Ramsus, Sigurd and Jessie. Citan initially fights with his bare fists, but later acquires a sword. During his combos, he moves so fast there are afterimages trailing his movement. When using his sword, Citan draws and strikes with it in a single motion. Citan's special techniques are known as "Arcane" magic.

=== Bart Fatima ===
Voiced by: Tomokazu Seki

Bartholomew Fatima (バルトロメイ・ファティマ, Barutoromei Fatima), nicknamed Bart (バルト, Baruto), is the leader of a group of sand pirates who ride the submarine Yggdrasil. He befriends Fei and Citan after shooting down a prison ship they were on. Bart is the rightful heir to the kingdom of Aveh, with Ethos agent Shakhan having forced his family out of the country years ago. Bart is accompanied by his mentor and half-brother, Sigurd Harcourt (シグルド・ハーコート, Shigurudo Hākōto), and well-mannered Lawrence Maison (ローレンス・メイソン, Rōrensu Meison). Bart and Sigurd are each missing an eye, their left and right ones respectively, and wear identical eyepatches. He wields a whip in battle.

Bart's ancestors Roni Fatima (ロニ・ファティマ) and Rene Fatima (レネ・ファティマ) were fraternal twin brothers who founded Aveh, and were comrades of Lacan and Sophia during the rebellion against Solaris. Their names are a reference to Edgar Roni Figaro and Sabin Rene Figaro, characters from Final Fantasy VI created by Xenogears co-writer Kaori Tanaka.

=== Rico Banderas ===
Voiced by: Mugihito

Ricardo Banderas (リカルド・バンデラス, Rikarudo Banderasu), nicknamed Rico (リコ, Riko), is a massive demi-human and champion Gear fighter in Nortune, the imperial capital of Kislev. He has a sturdy reputation, and his size can be frightening. Despite being a prisoner, his lifestyle is superior to that of many nobles and he appears to have a connection with the Kislev ruler. He has high strength, but the slowest speed and lower accuracy.

=== Billy Lee Black ===
Voiced by: Yūji Ueda

Billy Lee Black (ビリー・リー・ブラック, Birī Rī Burakku) is a young, pacifistic priest of the Ethos religion, who is later revealed to be a member of the Etone branch, which job is to "clean" and "purge" the world from the Reapers, or -Wels-. He has a problematic relationship with his father Jesse B. Black (ジェシー・B・ブラック, Jeshī B. Burakku), real name Jessiah Blanche (ジェサイア・ブランシュ, Jesaia Buranshu), who abandoned his family for several years after they moved to the surface from Solaris. Having been mentored by the Ethos leader Bishop Stone, Billy dedicated his life to religion and cares for many children including his younger sister Primera (プリメーラ, Purimēra) at an Ethos orphanage. He wields triple guns and can use support "Ether" spells.

=== Maria Balthasar ===
Maria Balthasar (マリア・バルタザール, Maria Barutazāru) is a young girl residing in Shevat who pilots Seibzehn, a special Gear her father, Nikolai, created to protect her home. Solaris kidnapped him to make new Gears, causing her to bear a grudge against Solaris. Her grandfather is the gear engineer Balthasar. Although her gear is powerful, Maria's physical attacks are weak. However, she can use ether attacks to call Seibzehn to attack enemies, even in enclosed areas.

=== Chu-Chu ===
Voiced by: Kumiko Watanabe

Chu-Chu (チュチュ) was with Marguerite during her imprisonment in Fatima Castle. Her race once lived in the woods, but they nearly became extinct due to Solaris's activities. Some managed to escape to Shevat and live with Wiseman. Chu-Chu can grow to the size of a gear once the physical part of the limiter is removed. She has the unique ability to heal other gears, and does not need fuel to fight, but has poor stats and no special attacks in "gear" form. She has romantic interest for Fei.

=== Emeralda ===
Voiced by: Michiko Neya

Emeralda (エメラダ, Emerada) is a nanomachine colony built to aid the human race. Kim Kharim, Fei's second known incarnation, created Emeralda during the Zeboim era by analyzing Elly's gene pattern and creating a nanomachine colony. At the time, Miang was manipulating the government, and wanted to reset the human evolutionary cycle by starting a worldwide nuclear war. In the present, Emeralda is revived from an archeological site and Krelian uses him to enhance his nanomachine technology. She is used to guard a Solaris gate, but joins the party afterwards. She initially seems unable to differentiate between Fei and his previous incarnation Kim, and responds to being told his name is Fei by calling him "Fei's Kim" for most of the game. Emeralda possesses powerful ether spells. She does not wield any weapons, instead morphing her limbs and hair into various melee weapons while attacking. She initially has the appearance of a child, but an optional side quest late in the game causes her to assume the form of an adult woman, a transformation which greatly improves her stat growth.

== Main antagonists ==
=== Deus ===
Deus (デウス, Deusu) is the core of an interplanetary invasion system, which was built ten thousand years prior to the game's story. Because of its power, Deus was placed on the Eldridge spaceship, but it soon became fully self aware and took control of the entire ship. When the captain of the Eldridge self-destructed his ship, Deus was not destroyed, instead crashing into a nearby planet. Deus then created The Complement named Hawwa (Miang), who gave birth to Emperor Cain and the Gazel Ministry. Hawwa's task was to establish a human civilization on the planet to one day use humans for its resurrection.

There was a controversy surrounding Fei's goal of killing the god that created mankind, which many believed could have cancelled a North American release of the game.

=== Gazel Ministry ===
The Gazel Ministry (ガゼル法院, Gazeru Hō-in; Gazel Law Institute) is the main governing body of Solaris. They were originally among the first human beings born on the planet and half of the core organic component of Deus, known as the 'Animus', and seek to realign with their respective 'Anima', the Anima Relics.

Five hundred years before the events of the game, the Ministry were at odds with Miang, so they provided her to Shevat in exchange for the rebel army. Soon after, Grahf summoned mysterious Diabolos forces to kill them. Krelian eventually revived eight of the twelve ministers as computer data in the SOL-9000 after becoming part of Solaris.

Throughout the game the Ministry fears Fei and seeks to destroy him because he is the reincarnation of Lacan, who was responsible for their original demise. They show disdain towards Ramsus because of his constant failure to defeat Fei. They seek to resurrect their bodies using the main characters, who are their descendants. The Ministry eventually becomes at odds with Emperor Cain when he prevents them from using the 'Gaetia Key', a device that will resurrect God's paradise, Mahanon. Because of Miang and Krelian's manipulation of Ramsus, he assassinates Cain for them and the Ministry uses the Key. However, afterward he has no more use for them and erases them.

=== Grahf ===
Grahf (グラーフ, Gurāfu), who calls himself "The Seeker of Power", is the persona of Lacan that split off after Miang influenced Lacan to make contact with the Zohar five hundred years prior to the game's beginning. Grahf is the personification of Lacan's will, but is not considered to be the "original" Lacan, as The Contact instead transmigrated to be reborn in Fei's body.

He seeks to merge with Fei and regain his original form as The Contact, then awaken Deus and destroy all life, which he concluded was the only path to freedom after his contact with the Existence as Lacan. He learned the ability to move between bodies, giving him a form of eternal life.

Grahf discovered the new incarnation of the Contact in Fei when Fei was a child and attempted to merge with him, but Fei's father, Khan, intervened. During their battle, Fei was unable to contain the powers the Existence passed onto him and unleashed a powerful force that killed his mother. Grahf then took in Fei, who had awakened as Id, and trained him as an assassin until Khan caught up to them. Grahf tried to merge with Id, but Khan fought back and ultimately defeated Grahf. Grahf then took over Khan's body, but not before Khan, as Wiseman, took Fei to Lahan Village.

Although he no longer possesses the full potential of "The Contact," Grahf is more powerful than any other character except for Fei as "The Contact" when all divisions of his personality merge. Despite this, he rarely fights directly, and instead grants what he calls "the Power" to lesser villains, allowing them to fight the party with enhanced abilities. However, this power inevitably leads to madness and their destruction.

Fei ultimately defeats Grahf after merging with all of his personalities and meeting the Wave Existence. Now able to access his full powers, Fei's gear transforms into the Xenogears and engages Grahf in a one-on-one fight. After his defeat, he sacrifices himself to merge with the Zohar and delay Deus' awakening, allowing the party to escape and prepare for the final battle.

=== Id ===
Id (イド, Ido) is Fei's split personality, who was created when he tried to repress his traumatic childhood memories of abuse at the hands of scientists and his mother, who was possessed by Miang. Id is brutal and malicious and seeks to destroy the planet by making contact with the Zohar. Throughout the game, Id appears when Fei is off screen, with Fei being unaware of its existence until it is explained to him. Id represents Fei's id.

=== Kahran Ramsus ===
Kahran Ramsus (カーラン・ラムサス, Kāran Ramusasu) commands Gebler alongside Miang and holds a prominent position in Solaris's hierarchy. Miang and Krelian originally created him in a nanoreactor as a clone of the Emperor Cain, but was abandoned after Fei was discovered. He grew up in the Elements, a special Solaris fighting squad, and knew Citan, who was attracted to Ramsus' ideals against class distinctions. Ramsus grows obsessed with defeating Fei over the course of the game because his existence made Ramsus feel worthless.

=== Krelian ===
Voiced by: Ryōtarō Okiayu

Krelian (カレルレン, Kareruren) is the secondary antagonist and the anti-hero of the game. He is the leader of Solaris, which controls most of the world's affairs. Initially a land dweller, Krelian's scientific knowledge has enabled him to prolong his life and exert power over Emperor Cain and the Gazel Ministry. After Sophia's death centuries ago, Krelian became convinced that God did not exist and that he would need to create God with his own hands, after which he started working with Miang. His name is a mistransliteration from Japanese for "Karellen", referencing an overlord character from Arthur C. Clarke's novel Childhood's End.

=== Miang ===
Miang Hawwa (ミァン・ハッワー, Mian Hawwā) is the main antagonist and the mastermind behind the game's events, acting as a representative of Deus. The final moments of the Eldridge catastrophe resulted in the creation of the original 'mother' being, which the Deus system tasked with giving birth to a civilization that would provide and gather the biological and mechanical "spare parts" it needed to repair and reactivate. Hawwa is the Arabic name of Eve, while the romanized form Myyah is almost the reverse of Elly's full name Elhaym, with the omitted 'El' being Hebrew for 'God', symbolizing how she is connected to but different from her. Miang has lived across many incarnations by inhabiting different bodies.

Miang's first incarnation was known as Hawwa, The Complement, one of the few humans that Deus gave birth to. Her purpose was to guide and shape the events of human history to better suit Deus' coming resurrection. All human women descended from the crash of the Eldridge and possess the genetic factor necessary to become her next incarnation. She always inhabits the body of an adult female, with the momentary transformation resulting in purple hair and eyes. The only notable superhuman abilities she possesses are the ability to retain memories across incarnations and some psionic abilities. She rarely fights physically, instead piloting the C-1 Vierge.

== Other characters ==
=== Emperor Cain ===
Emperor Cain (天帝カイン, Tentei Kain; Heavenly King Cain) is the ruler of Solaris. He was created along with the Gazel Ministry and Miang to serve as part of the resurrection of Deus. When Abel and Elly fight against Cain's plans for resurrecting Deus, Cain plotted the death of Abel, an allusion to Original sin. Although he is supposed to aid Deus as a leader of Solaris, he actually believes in improving humanity's lives. He becomes at odds with the Gazel Ministry when they want to use the Gaetia Key, and Ramsus eventually assassinates him under Krelian's orders.

=== Margie Fatima ===
Marguerite Fatima (マルグレーテ・ファティマ, Marugurēte Fatima), nicknamed Margie (マルー, Marū), is the current Holy Mother of Nisan, a position Sophia once held. She is both Bart's first cousin and his fiancée, as they are the only living members of the Fatima royal family. She is calm and endearing despite her duties.

=== Hammer ===
Hammer (ハマー, Hamā) is a rat demi-human who meets Fei in Kislev's D Block Prison. During the Kislev scenario, Hammer presents himself as a shifty, though reliable mechanic, item seller, and intelligence gatherer. He is seemingly well known throughout Kislev, as he is able to freely roam on his own despite being a prisoner. Hammer tags along with the group as they steal the Goliath plane, but is separated from them following an encounter with Grahf. He reappears later on after apparently encountering Krelian and being given a new cyborg body. He explains to the party he had originally been sent to spy on them, but refused to cooperate. He then asks the party to destroy him, as he has only a limited amount of control over his new body and he does not want to be Krelian's puppet. He then sabotages his gear while the party takes him down.

=== The Elements ===
An elite four-member team of Solaris' military, with each representing one of four elements; earth, water, wind, fire. In the past, the group was composed of Ramsus, Citan, Jesse and Sigurd; in the present, it is composed of four young women, each named after an order of angels. They currently work directly under Ramsus, and encounter the party several times. In the final encounter with the Elements, they combine their four gears into a super-gear.

- Dominia Yizkor (ドミニア・イズコール, Dominia Izukōru), the Element of Earth, is a vicious, domineering woman who is the team's leader; she is the only member with a surname. She became the soldier she is today after becoming the sole survivor of the events at Elru, which was destroyed by war, and Id in particular. She has numerous altercations with Elly in particular, mocking her for her noble origins. Despite being the Element of Earth, Dominia infuses all of the four elements into her blade. She is the only Element to do this, as the others exclusively use their own element. She pilots a sword-wielding gear called Bladegash.
- Kelvena (Cherubina (ケルビナ, Kerubina)) is the Element of Water. Unlike Domina, she is calm and cool, even apologizing to Elly for Dominia's harshness despite being on opposing sides. Kelvena pilots an aquatic gear called Marinebasher. Her character portraits often show her with her eyes closed, implying she may be blind. In reality, her innate ether power is so great that she must exert considerable concentration to keep it under control.
- Tolone (Throne (トロネ, Torone)) is the Element of Wind. She is a cyborg, as she makes reference to her "positronic photon brain", and is serious and humorless. She pilots a bird-like gear called Skyghene.
- Seraphita (セラフィータ, Serafīta) is the Element of Fire. She is a foil to Dominia and Tolone's rigidity, as she is unintelligent. She pilots a gear called Grandgrowl, which resembles a lion.

=== Wave Existence ===
The Wave Existence (波動存在, Hadō Sonzai) exists within the Zohar, and was present during the events on the Eldridge. Deus used the Zohar as an energy source; while attempting to explore infinite energy phenomena, the Zohar tapped into a higher dimension and pulled the Existence to this dimension, becoming a source of infinite energy for Deus. The Existence is the source of the higher dimension, of which a small portion spilled into this dimension, making the Existence the true God of the Xenogears universe. It seeks to escape from the Zohar and Deus' control and return to its own dimension. The Wave Existence made contact with Abel, Fei's ancestor, aboard the Eldridge, allowing Abel to safely land on the planet with Deus. It also created Elly as a companion for Abel and gave them the power to be reincarnated throughout history to defeat Deus. It is ultimately freed after Fei defeats Deus.

=== Wiseman ===
Wiseman (ワイズマン, Waizuman) appears throughout the game to aid Fei, and is secretly a personality inside of his father, Khan Wong (ウォン・カーン, Won Kān), who formed inside of him when Grahf entered his body after he defeated him ten years prior to the game's events. Wiseman's appearance inside Khan occurred to balance out Grahf's destructive persona. Wiseman later brought Fei to Lahan to hide him from Grahf.

=== Queen Zephyr ===
Queen Zephyr (ゼファー女王, Zefā Joō) is the ruler of Shevat, who became ruler after the rest of the royal family was killed during the rebellion against Solaris five hundred years prior to the game's events. She relies on Wiseman to keep her informed of events outside Shevat. Her top advisors are Gurus Gaspar (ガスパール, Gasupāru), Taura Melchior (トーラ・メルキオール, Tōra Merukiōru) and Isaac Balthasar (アイザック・バルタザール, Aizakku Barutazāru).

== Reception ==
The characters of Xenogears have been well received, the lead protagonist Fei in particular, who has been called videogames' "most complicated Freudian hero." The staff of Edge felt that Fei's deep backstory and character in general was "a far cry from the simplistic two-dimensional leads of Square's Super Nintendo RPGs of just a few years earlier." Edge also pointed out the NPCs present during the beginning scenes and how they bring depth to the scenario. "As a player, you feel awkward and ashamed in the presence of these NPCs, a guilty confusion and helplessness which perfectly mirrors that felt by your character and justifies his immediate exile", the staff wrote. IGN praised both the characters themselves and their designs. In a review for the game at Pulpfilm.com, attention is paid to the secondary characters, who, as the reviewer explains, have "profoundly interesting backstories", but are never adequately resolved by the end of the game, which other reviews also note. An article from Electronic Gaming Monthly titled WTFiction!? listed Xenogears as one of the "wackiest game plotlines ever." Jeremey Parish went on to write that many characters in the game only made the plot more confusing, including Chu-Chu and Grahf.

The in-game character sprites have met less praise. A GameSpot reviewer stated that the "game's character sprites are poorly animated and suffer from terrible pixelation, no doubt due to the PlayStation's limited RAM." Other critics disagree, arguing that the characters are more realistic than the characters from Final Fantasy VII. In a preview of the game, IGN compared the character sprites to those of Parasite Eve, saying that "the game's designers have opted for a more traditional, anime-style look. But this doesn't mean the pint-size characters or low-detail environments of RPGs gone by."
