= Hung Ga =

Chinese martial art

Hung Ga Kuen 洪家拳
- Also known as: Hung Ga, Hung Gar, Hung Kuen, Hung Ga Kuen, Hung Gar Kuen
- Focus: Striking
- Country of origin: China
- Creator: Hung Hei-gun
- Famous practitioners: (see below)
- Parenthood: Shaolin Kung Fu, Nanquan, Five Animal forms, Bak Fu Pai (White Tiger Kung Fu), Fujian White Crane, Mok Gar (additional influence for Wong Fei Hung lineage)
- Descendant arts: Choy ga, Fut Gar, Hung Fut, Jow-Ga Kung Fu
- Olympic sport: No

Chinese name
- Chinese: 洪家
- Literal meaning: Hung family
Transcriptions
Standard Mandarin
- Hanyu Pinyin: Hóng Jiā
- Wade–Giles: Hung^{2} Chia^{1}
Yue: Cantonese
- Yale Romanization: Hùhng Gār

Alternative name
- Chinese: 洪拳
- Literal meaning: immense fist
Transcriptions
Standard Mandarin
- Hanyu Pinyin: Hóng Quán
- Wade–Giles: Hung^{2} Ch'üan^{2}
Yue: Cantonese
- Yale Romanization: Hùhng Kyùhn

Hung Ga Kuen (Cantonese) or Hongjiaquan (Mandarin) (Chinese: 洪家拳, "fist of the Hung family"), alternatively shortened as either Hung Ga (洪家, Hung Family) or Hung Kuen (洪拳, Hung fist), is an ancient southern Chinese martial art, which roots lie in the Southern Shaolin kung fu. During the turn of the 3rd millennium, Hung Ga was one of the most widely practiced styles of kung fu from southern China in the world.

It is best known for its low and stable positions, its powerful attacks mainly developed with the upper limbs, many blocks and also the work of internal energy. Its techniques are influenced by Bak Fu Pai (White Tiger Kung Fu) as well as Fujian White Crane. In addition, the style takes up postures that imitate the other five classic animals of Shaolin quan: the tiger, the crane, the leopard, the snake, and the bear, as well as hand forms of the dragon style qigong and its simultaneous double strikes.

Hung Gar Kuen is represented in the world in mainly four family branches: Tang Fung, Lam, Chiu and Lau. What the four have in common is that they have branched out from the most famous Hung Gar master of them all, Wong Fei-hung. Despite differences between these family branches, they strive for the same goal, to preserve one of the richest martial arts from China.

== Characteristics and features ==
Hung Ga's technique employs the simultaneous use of attack and blocking, where the block is occasionally used as a conjunctive attack on the opponent. For instance, if a Hung Ga practitioner receives a strike to his upper body or head, they can meet the incoming force with their own block, which is delivered with such force that it will overwhelm the opponent's defensive abilities. The aim is to seriously injure the opponent or inflict such intense pain it will weaken the opponent's retaliation.

The hallmarks of Hung Ga are strong stances, notably the horse stance, and strong hand techniques, notably the bridge hand and the versatile tiger claw.

Traditionally, students spent anywhere from several months to three years in stance training, often sitting only in horse stance from half an hour to several hours at a time, before learning any forms. Each form could then take a year or so to learn, with weapons learned last. In current times, this mode of instruction is generally considered impractical for students, who have other concerns beyond practicing kung fu. However, some instructors still follow traditional guidelines and make stance training the majority of their beginner training.

== Historical origins ==
Hung Ga's earliest beginnings have been traced to the 17th century in southern China. More specifically, legend has it that a Shaolin monk, Jee Sin Sim See was at the heart of Hung Ga's emergence. Jee Sin Sim See was alive during a time of fighting in the Qing dynasty. He practiced the arts during an era when the Shaolin Temple had become a refuge for those that opposed the ruling class (the Manchus), allowing him to practice in semi-secrecy. When the Shaolin temple was burned down, many fled to the Southern affiliated Shaolin temple in the Fukien Province of Southern China along with him. There it is believed Jee Sin Sim See trained several people, including non-Buddhist monks, also called Shaolin Layman Disciples, in the art of Shaolin Kung Fu.

Of course, Jee Sin Sim See was hardly the only person of significance that had fled to the temple and opposed the Manchus. Along with this, tea merchant Hung Hei-gun also took refuge there, where he trained under Jee Sin Sim See. Eventually, Hung Hei-gun became Jee Sin Sim See's most prodigious student.

That said, legend has it that Jee Sin Sim See also taught four others, whom in their entirety became the founding fathers of the five southern Shaolin styles: Hung Ga, Choy Ga, Mok Ga, Li Ga and Lau Ga. Luk Ah-choi was one of these students.

According to one of the origin legends, Hung Hei-guan combined the Shaolin tiger techniques (Fok Fu Kuen) and the crane techniques (Bak Hok Kuen), which he learned from his wife, and developed Hung Gar Kung Fu from them. Hung Hei-guan's wife, Fong Wing-chun (presumably Fang Qiniang / Fong Chut-Leung) was an expert in the crane-style. She had acquired her knowledge from Fong Sai-yuk (a training partner of Hung Hei-guan and also a student of Shaolin), with Fong Sai-yuk and Fong Wing-chun being related to each other. Therefore, Hung Gar Kuen is also known as Tiger-Crane Boxing (Fu Hok Kuen). Due to the characteristic techniques of the tiger and the crane, this style is based on the concept of Yam and Yeung (Yin and Yang), which has also fundamentally influenced Chinese thinking.

Because the character "Hung" (洪) was used in the reign name of the emperor who overthrew the Mongol Yuan dynasty to establish the Han Chinese Ming dynasty, opponents of the Manchu Qing dynasty made frequent use of the character in their imagery. (Ironically, Luk Ah-choi was the son of a Manchu stationed in Guangdong.) Hung Hei-gun is itself an assumed name intended to honor that first Ming Emperor. Anti-Qing rebels named the most far reaching of the secret societies they formed the "Hung Mun".

The Hung Mun claimed to be founded by survivors of the destruction of the Shaolin Temple, and the martial arts its members practiced came to be called "Hung Ga" and "Hung Kuen".

Its popularity in modern times is mainly associated with the Cantonese folk hero Wong Fei-hung, a Hung Ga master.

== The Hung Ga curriculum of Wong Fei-hung ==
The Hung Ga curriculum that Wong Fei-hung learned from his father consisted of Single Hard Fist, Double Hard Fist, Taming the Tiger Fist, Black Tiger Fist, Angry Tiger Fist, and Arhat Fist, Fifth Brother Eight Trigram Pole, Mother & Son Butterfly Swords, and the Flying Hook.

Wong distilled his father's empty-hand material along with the material he learned from other masters into the "pillars" of Hung Ga, four empty-hand routines that constitute the core of Hung Ga instruction in the Wong Fei-hung lineage: Taming the Tiger Fist, Tiger Crane Paired Form Fist, Five Animal Fist, and Iron Wire Fist.

Taming the Tiger Fist

The long routine Taming the Tiger trains the student in the basic techniques of Hung Ga while building endurance. It is said to go at least as far back as Jee Sin Sim See, who is said to have taught Taming the Tiger—or at least an early version of it—to both Hung Hei-gun and Luk Ah-choi.

Tiger Crane Paired Form Fist

Tiger Crane builds on Taming the Tiger, adding "vocabulary" to the Hung Ga practitioner's repertoire. Wong Fei-hung choreographed the version of Tiger Crane handed down in the lineages that descend from him. He is said to have added to Tiger Crane the bridge hand techniques and rooting of the master Tit Kiu Saam as well as long arm techniques, attributed variously to the Fat Ga, Lo Hon, and Lama styles. Tiger Crane Paired Form routines from outside Wong Fei-hung Hung Ga still exist.

Five Animal Fist/ Five Animal Five Element Fist

This routine serve as a bridge between the external force of Tiger Crane and the internal focus of Iron Wire. "Five Animals" (literally "Five Forms") refers to the characteristic Five Animals of the Southern Chinese martial arts: Dragon, Snake, Tiger, Leopard, and Crane. "Five Elements" refers to the five classical Chinese elements: Earth, Water, Fire, Metal, and Wood. The Hung Ga Five Animal Fist was choreographed by Wong Fei-hung and expanded by Lam Sai-wing, a senior student and teaching assistant of Wong Fei-hung, into the Five Animal Five Element Fist (or the "Ten Form Fist"). In the Lam Sai-wing branch of Hung Ga, the Five Animal Five Element Fist has largely, but not entirely, superseded the Five Animal Fist, which has become associated with Dang Fong and others who were not around when the Five Animal Five Element Fist was modified.

Iron Wire Fist

Iron Wire builds internal power and is attributed to the martial arts master Leung Kwan, better known as Tit Kiuh-saam. Like Wong Fei-hung's father Wong Kei-Ying, Tit Sin-saam was one of the Ten Tigers of Canton. As a teenager, Wong Fei Hung learned Iron Wire from Lam Fuk-sing, a student of Tit Sin-saam. The routine has been enhanced and thus lengthened by his students. The Iron Wire form is essentially a combination of Hei Gung or meditative breathing with isometric exercise, particularly dynamic tension, although weights were also used in traditional practice in the form of iron rings worn on the wrists. If properly practiced, it can increase strength considerably and promote a stable root.

Wong Fei-hung weapon of choice was primarily the Fifth Brother Eight Trigram Pole, which is a very popular routine in southern styles. The Mother & Son Butterfly Swords is also a primary weapon found in all Southern styles. Other weapons credited to having been taught in Wong Fei-hung curriculum were the Spring & Autumn Guandao, and the Yu Family Tiger Fork broadsword, the spear, the fan. The curriculum has grown extensively in all areas.

== Branches of Hung Kuen ==
The curricula of different branches of Hung Ga differ tremendously with regard to routines and the selection of weapons, even within the Wong Fei-hung lineage.

Just as those branches that do not descend from Lam Sai-wing do not practice the Five Animal Five Element Fist. Those branches that do not descend from Wong Fei-hung, are sometimes called "old Hung Kuen" or "village" Hung Kuen, do not practice the routines he choreographed, nor do the branches that do not descend from Tit Kiu Saam practice Iron Wire. Conversely, the curricula of some branches have grown through the addition of further routines by creation or acquisition.

Nevertheless, the various branches of the Wong Fei-hung lineage still share the Hung Ga foundation he systematized. Lacking such a common point of reference, the "village" styles of Hung Kuen show even greater variation.

The curriculum which Jee Sin Sim See taught Hung Hei-gun is said to have comprised Tiger style, Luohan style, and Taming the Tiger routine. Exchanging material with other martial artists allowed Hung to develop or acquire Tiger Crane Paired Form routine, a combination animal routine, Southern Flower Fist, and several weapons.

According to Hung Ga tradition, the martial arts that Jee Sin Sim See originally taught Hung Hei-gun were short range and the more active footwork, wider stances, and long range techniques commonly associated with Hung Ga were added later. It is said to have featured "a two-foot horse," that is, narrow stances, and routines whose footwork typically took up no more than four tiles' worth of space.

Hasayfu Hung Ga

The Ha Sei Fu is said to fit this description, though the implied link to the legendary Jee Sin Sim See is more speculative than most because of its poorly documented genealogy. The Hasayfu Hung Kuen of Leung Wah-chew is a Five Animal style with a separate routine for each animal. Other Branches of Hasayfu Hung Kuen also contain combined animal sets, like Tiger & Crane, Dragon & Leopard, etc.

Five-Pattern Hung Kuen

Similar to Ha Sei Fu Hung Ga, the Ng Ying Hung Kuen fits the description of Jee Sin Sim See's martial arts, but traces its ancestry to Ng Mui and Miu Hin who, like Jee Sin Sim See, were both survivors of the destruction of the Shaolin Monastery. From Miu Hin, the Five-Pattern Hung Kuen passed to his daughter Miu Tsui-fa, and from his daughter to his grandson Fong Sai-yuk, both Chinese folk heroes like Jee Sin Sim See, Ng Mui, and their forebear Miu Hin. Yuen Yik-kai's books introduced this branch to the Western world while conventionally translated as "Five-Pattern Hung Fist" rather than "Five Animal Hung Fist", it is a Five-Animal style, one with a single routine for all Five Animals but also has other sets as well.

Tiger Crane Paired Form

The Tiger-Crane Combination style has been found in almost every Hung style. While not as long as the Wong Fei-hung version, it is typically seen as containing 108 movements/techniques.

Ang Lian-huat attributes the art to Hung Hei-gun's combination of the Tiger style he learned from Jee Sin Sim See with the Crane style he learned from his wife, whose name is given in Hokkien as Tee Eng-choon. Like other martial arts that trace their origins to Fujian (e.g. Fujian White Crane, Five Ancestors), this style uses San Chian as its foundation.

Wong Kiew-kit trace their version of the Tiger Crane routine, not to Hung Hei-gun or Luk Ah-choi, but to their senior classmate Harng Yein.

Northern Hung Kuen

There are northern styles that use the name "Hung Kuen", though these predate the Qing dynasty. Other northern styles use the character for "Red Fist".

== The dissemination of Hung Kuen ==
The dissemination of Hung Kuen in Southern China, and its Guangdong and Fujian Provinces in particular, is due to the concentration of anti-Qing activity there. The Hung Mun began life in the 1760s as the Heaven and Earth Society, whose founders came from the prefecture of Zhangzhou in Fujian Province, on its border with Guangdong, where one of its founders organized a precursor to the Heaven and Earth Society in Huizhou. Guangdong and Fujian remained a stronghold of sympathizers and recruits for the Hung Mun, even as it spread elsewhere in the decades that followed. Though the members of the Hung Clan almost certainly practiced a variety of martial arts styles, the composition of its membership meant that it was the characteristics of Fujianese and Cantonese martial arts that came to be associated with the names "Hung Kuen" and "Hung Ga". Regardless of their differences, the Hung Kuen lineages of Wong Fei-hung, Yuen Yik-kai, Leung Wah-chew, and Jeung Kei-ji trace their origins to this area and time period, are all Five Animal styles, and all claim Shaolin origins. Northern Hung Kuen, by contrast, is not a Five Animal style, and dates to the 16th century. Cantonese and Fujianese are also predominant among Overseas Chinese, accounting for the widespread dissemination of Hung Kuen outside of China.

== Wong Fei-Hung lineages ==
Lam Sai-wings Lineage mainly descends from Wong Fei-hung.

- Chan Hon-chung, who was very famous in Hong Kong and represented what was best in his generation of masters. He held incredible knowledge and had the full Hung Kuen system passed down from Lam Sai-wing. In 1938, he established the Chan Hon Chung Gymnasium to teach Hung Gar (Hung Family) kung fu. In 1970, he formed The Hong Kong Chinese Martial Arts Association with the intention of coordinating and promoting Chinese martial arts in Hong Kong, and held the position of chairman for many years.

- Lau Jaam Hung Kuen family lineage (Learn From Lam Sai-wing). One of the more famous teachers of Hung Kuen today was the Shaw Brothers movie director/actor, Lau Kar-leung, who has many students in Hong Kong. One of Lau Kar-leung's notable disciples is Mark Ho (Ho Mai, 何麥), also known as Mark Houghton, an Englishman who has lived in Hong Kong for 20 years. Mark Ho, with the blessing of Lau Kar-Leung, has opened a unique Hung Kuen school in Fanling. The school itself looks like a scene from a Shaw Brothers movie; it has many training chambers, wooden dummies, and hanging logs. There are now Lau Family Hung Kuen schools in China and England. Lau Kar-yung He is the grandson of Lau Cham. Kar-yung is the son of Lau Cham's second daughter Lau Shiu-yee and His uncle is Lau Kar-leung and also he is Lau Kar-wing's nephew. Kar-yung was followed by Lau Shiu-yee (Mother) to learn Lau's Family Hung Ga kung fu and, Chinese herbal medicine at Lau Cham's martial arts school in Hong Kong. Then he became a member of the Lau Kar Ban / Lau's brothers and made some of the best Kung Fu movies ever seen. After 50 years of training and profession, he is currently the Grandmaster of Lau's family Hung Kuen Branch and he continues spreading his family lineage across the globe. Also, become President of Hung Gar Association Lau Kar Yung Hung Kuen Kung Fu Association. Additional Lau family disciples were added for the 6th generation apprentice, representing Germany: Master Jau-chi Hang, Mexico: Master James Valentino Santi, and United States Lau Martial Club Hung Kuen Lion Dance Association: Master Chun Sun Ho (Chris Ho){son of Kar Yung}, Master Jaelynn Mae Ho {Daughter of Chun Sun} and Master Ken Chow.

- Lam Cho (Lam Sai-wing's adopted nephew) was an icon in the Hong Kong martial arts scene. He succeeded in successful innovations and creative additions of various Hand and Weapon Routines. Lam Cho has taught many well known masters that now have students around the world: Y.C. Wong (San Francisco), Bucksam Kong (Los Angeles and Hawaii), Kwong Tit-fu and Tang Kwok-wah (Boston). Lam Cho's children, Anthony Lam Chun-fai and Lam Chun-sing, now carry on his Hung Ga teaching in Hong Kong. Anthony Lam Chun-fai, his eldest son, has also done much to spread Hung Kuen in Europe, while Simon Lam Chun-chung, his third son, continues to teach his father's students and new students at Lam Cho's renowned studio in Hong Kong.

Among Tang Kwok-wah's students currently teaching in the area are Winchell Ping Chiu-woo (Chiu Mo Kwoon, Boston), Yon Lee (who is also the master instructor for the Harvard Tai Chi Tiger Crane kung fu Club at Harvard University since 1985), and Sik Y. Hum. Calvin Chin in Massachusetts, carries on Kwong's legacy.

Chiu Kau began learning Hung Kuen in Singapore, then became a student of Lam Sai-wing. He later married Wong Siu-ying (黃邵英), who began learning Hung Ga from her husband. The couple eventually settled down in Hong Kong, where they continued their Hung Ga training at the Lam Sai-wing National Art Association Second Branch. Their sons, Chiu Chi-ling of California, and Chiu Wai in Alberta, Canada, are the inheritors of this lineage. Kwong-wing Lam of California, studied with Chiu Kau, Chiu Wai, and Lam Jo, and learned the Ha Sei Fu style of Hung Ga from Leung Wah-chew. In Hong Kong, the original Chiu Wai Hung Kuen school continues under the teaching of Chiu Wah, and in 1996, another branch, Hung Kuen Academy Hong Kong, was established in Hong Kong by Gam Bok-yin, its Chairman and Chief Instructor. Some years later, Hung Kuen Academy Hong Kong appointed Chi Fai Leung as Vice-Chairman and Senior Instructor, and Lam Siu Fung as Instructor. As of 2021, Chi Fai Leung has founded a new branch in London, known as the Hung Kuen Academy UK, where he continues to teach traditional Hung Gar and lion dance, both of which are significant elements of the Chiu Wai lineage.

Dang Fong lineage students consists of such notables as: Ho Lap Tien - Represented in the U.S. by Philadelphia's Master Cheurng Shu Pui, Yuen Ling - Represented in the U.S. by Master Frank Yee, Lau Kai Ton - Represented in the U.S. by New Mexico's Master Frank Rivera, Luk Gan Wing - Represented in Ontario, Canada by his son, Cheung Tai Hing - Represented in the U.S. by New York's Master Wan Chi Ming, and Chow Wing Tak - Represented in Spain by Master Wong Ping Pui.

== See also ==
- The five major family styles of southern Chinese martial arts
- Jee Sin Sim See
- Wong Kei-ying
- Wong Fei-hung
- Lam Sai-wing
- Tang Fung
- Fu Jow Pai - Tiger Claw System
- Cantonese culture
- Hak Fu Mun - Black Tiger System
