= Dit da =

Traditional Chinese sports traumatology

Dit Da
- Chinese: 跌打
- Literal meaning: fall [and] hit
Transcriptions
Standard Mandarin
- Hanyu Pinyin: Diē dǎ
Yue: Cantonese
- Jyutping: dit^{3} daa^{2}

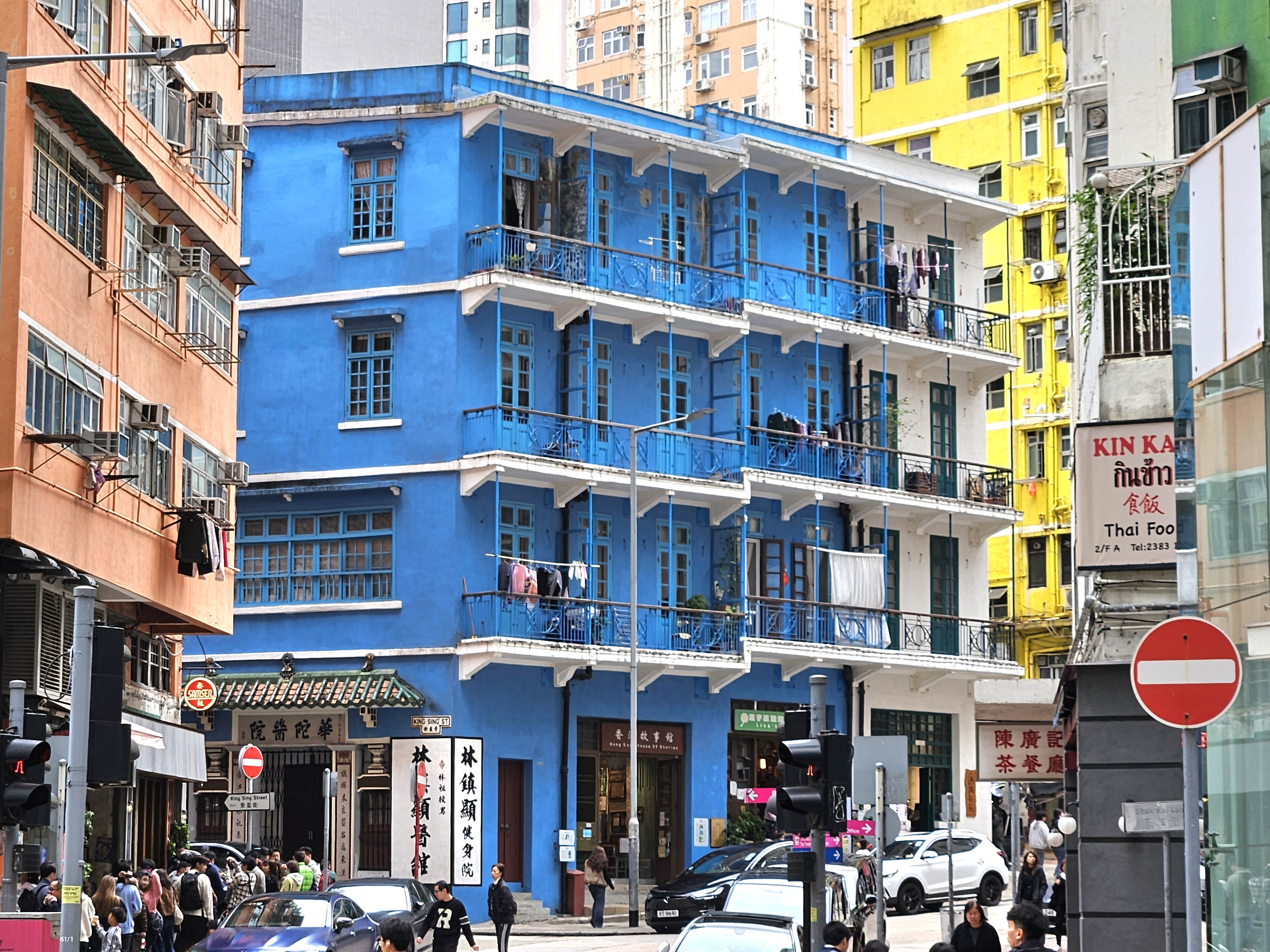
A dit da clinic run by martial artist Lam Cho, at Blue House, Hong Kong

Dit da (Chinese: 跌打; pinyin: diē dǎ; Jyutping: dit^{3} daa^{2}; lit. 'fall [and] hit'), tit da or die da is a traditional Chinese medicine discipline used to treat trauma and injuries such as bone fractures, sprains, and bruises. Methods include bone-setting and occasional use of topical preparations such as the dit da jow. Die da originated among martial artists in Guangdong.

== Background ==
Before one learns hitting others, one learns being hit. [Hence] before one learns the martial arts, one learns dit-da.

— Chinese idiom, Qing dynasty

Dit da originated in Guangdong, China, and was usually practiced by martial artists who knew aspects of traditional Chinese medicine. Dit da specialists may also use or recommend dit da jow, other Chinese medical therapies, and in modern times, the use of Western medicine if serious injury is involved. Dit da is not commonly practiced in the West, but it is currently practiced in Guangzhou, Hong Kong, Taiwan and Southeast Asia.

== History ==
The development of dit-da grew out of study by martial artists in Foshan, the main origin of "Southern-style" Chinese martial arts. This city has supported a rich martial arts tradition ever since the beginning of the Ming Dynasty. By the times between the end of the Qing Dynasty and the beginning of Republic of China rule, Foshan has become a hub of local martial arts activity, being home to numerous competing styles and giving birth to icons such as Ip Man and Wong Fei-hung. The intense competition also meant that bone and tendon injuries were common, fueling the development of a local form of traumatology.

=== Foshan gu-shang ===
Among the early practitioners were Li Cai-gan (–1915), who received initial education in TCM traumatology from a monk during his refuge in a small town near Guangzhou. Upon his return to Foshan, Cai-gan developed his version of the dit-da practice under the name gu-shang (Chinese: 骨伤; pinyin: gǔ shāng; Jyutping: gwat^{1} soeng^{1}; lit. 'bone injury').

After Cai-gan's death, his son Li Guang-hai (1894-1972) inherited his practice. Guang-hai would develop several innovations: a principle of "treating trauma by following the hematomas" (治伤从瘀), a collection of eight methods of bone setting, and a range of topical medications in liniment and paste form. Most important for the spread of his fame, however, were his charitable contributions. Guang-hai offered free medication and treatment during a severe flood in the 1910s. Later on, he offered free treatment, food, and boarding to patients traveling from neighboring towns. Beginning in 1939, he offered the same treatment for casualties for the local Communist guerrilla. At the founding of the Foshan Traditional Chinese Medicine Hospital (FTCMH) in 1956, Guang-hai was named its vice director. He became the director in 1960, was expelled during the Cultural Revolution, then returned to work as an ordinary doctor until his death.

Guang-hai's tenure also resulted in the spread of the study of "gu-shang", leading to several third-generation practitioners. Among them, his son Li Jia-da and his student Chen Wei-liang stayed at FTCMH, while his other son Li Jia-yu established a famous practice in Guangzhou. The two at FTCMH would go on to train Chen Xun-wen, noted for the incorporation of modern diagnostics, biomechanics, and medical imaging in his practice as well as a high paper output.

=== Other Foshan developments ===
Feng Liaoxing (1630-1695) was a Foshan dit da practitioner. He founded a pharmacy named after himself, which still exists today as a pharmaceutical company.

== Notable practitioners ==
- Leung Jan
- Wong Fei-hung
- Lam Sai-wing
- Lam Cho
- Kwan Tak-hing
- Luk Chee Fu
- Chris Leong Yann Kong (Malaysia)

== Conservation ==
Foshan traumatological pharmaceutical techniques were added to the intangible cultural heritage list of Foshan city government in 2015. Two of the listed practitioners were: Chen Xun-wen (Deputy Director, Orthopedic Center, Foshan Traditional Chinese Medicine Hospital; fourth generation), Zou Yun-xuan (Chief Chinese Physician, Department of Orthopedic Traumatology, FTCMH; fifth generation).

Chinese traditional bone-setting therapy (Foshan traumatological bone-setting) was added to the intangible cultural heritage list of Foshan city government in 2018. Two of the listed practitioners were: Chen Xun-wen (titles as above, fourth generation), He Lilei (Chief Chinese Physician, Department of Orthopedic Traumatology, FTCMH; fifth generation).

Feng Liaoxing's dit da jow formula is standardized in the Chinese Pharmacopoeia. The formula is on the intangible cultural heritage list of Guangdong.

== See also ==
- Chiropractic
- Joint manipulation
- Sports injury
- Tui na
- Osteopathic medicine in the United States – similar instance of incorporating traditional manipulation techniques into conventional orthopedics
