= Hasayfu =

Cantonese term

Hasayfu (下四虎) is the Cantonese term that translates to "Lower Four Counties" and has been applied to refer to a type of Hung Kuen kung fu style. This term is derived from the original term Ha Say Fu(下四府) pronounced similarly, but in the past referred to the four lower districts/Prefectures in Guangdong Province. The lower districts or Xia Si Fu (in Mandarin)referred to Gaozhou (高州府), Leizhou (雷州府), Qinzhou (钦州府) and Qiongzhou (琼州府). Gaozhou and Leizho refer to the modern areas of Zhanjiang (湛江) and Maoming (茂名) in Guangdong Province.

This style of Hung Kuen is practiced widely in China and across South East Asia but was rarely known in the west, with the exception in the United States, where Grandmaster Kwong Wing Lam is considered a practitioner of this style of kung fu.

Leung Hwa Chiu

== Name of the System ==
The style may have been known as Zhanjiang Hung Kuen in China, but it has been given the name of Hasayfu (Lower Four Districts) by Grandmaster Wing Lam, and later his students desired a more inspiring title for the art, given that the pronunciation of the Chinese character "province" is similar to that of "tiger." Therefore, Grandmaster Wing Lam and his students began referring to the style as "the Four Lower Tigers."

== Ha Say Fu Style today ==
Grandmaster Wing Lam and Sifu Alamudeen

Hasayfu is a rarely demonstrated system of kung fu outside of China and South East Asia. In the United States, Grandmaster Wing Lam studied the style with Leung Hwa Chiu and taught it as part of an overall Hung Kuen curriculum that included Lam family Hung Gar, with Ha Say Fu taught to advanced students. Sifu Saleem Alamudeen, Grandmaster Wing Lam's disciple, teaches Hasayfu as a separate curriculum.

== System Characteristics ==
=== Stance Training ===
Basic conditioning consists of stance training and qigong. The basic stances of Hasayfu Hung Ga are the straight bow and staggered bow stances, staggered horse stance, cat stance, twist stance, and the Yee-Gee Kim-Yeung Ma. The Yee-Gee Kim-Yeung Ma is the foundation stance of Hasayfu Hung Gar. It is used in training much like the square horse stance of the other styles. Feet are turned inward and knees pushed outward. At the same time, the pelvis is pushed forward, chest is hollowed and leans backward slightly, forming an "S" shape.

=== Forms ===
The curriculum differs across the various branches, but is commonly recognized in southern China as a 10 animal system. In the US, only five animals formed the style under the tutelage Wing Lam, which consists of empty hand form sets that are known in Chinese martial arts as the Five Animals. The Five Animals of Hasayfu are: Panther, Tiger, Snake, Crane, and Dragon. These forms are usually taught in this sequence. It is thought that the natural elements of the animals can be perceived and appreciated by proper understanding of the forms. Each hand form contains unique conditioning exercises that aim to develop the essence of each animal. The first two forms, the Panther and the Tiger forms, focus on developing speed and strength, respectively. The third hand form, the Snake, focuses on the cultivation of Qi, the vital, intrinsic energy that is the focus of the internal martial arts. The primary emphasis of the Crane Form is to develop ligament strength and balance. After developing the four physical essences from the previous forms, a student is introduced to the Dragon Form last to enable a cultivation of spirit, a higher state of awareness.

- Panther Form - Panther Form movements are quick and agile, representing the essence of speed.
- Tiger Form - The characteristics of the movements in the Tiger form are strong and explosive, representing the essence of strength.
- Snake Form - The Snake Form cultivates chi through the development of soft strength by imitating the flowing motions and relentless nature of a snake.
- Crane Form - Ligament strength, balance, and calmness exemplify the spirit that the Crane form seeks to develop. Compared to the relentless nature of a Snake, the character of a Crane is composed, in a state of stable balance. Its strikes are quick, strong, and deadly accurate even though its body remains in stillness.
- Dragon Form - Dragon form represents the pinnacle of physical and mental development. The focus of the form is to elevate the spirit to a higher state of awareness where conscious thoughts and self-awareness no longer matter. Physical actions and reactions become instantaneous, without conscious efforts.

=== Weapons Forms ===
The weapons used in Hasayfu Hung Gar contain not only the common Southern styles weapons such as butterfly swords, chain whips, and trident. The style also has certain weapons that are peculiar to Hasayfu such the Thunder Hoe, Heaven General Nine-Point Rake, Double Gan, and Double Tiger-Head Shields. Weapons fall into two categories: farming and military. Farming weapons include: Thunder Hoe, Heaven General Nine-Point Rake, Dragon-Head Wooden Bench, and the Tiger Fork or Trident. Military weapons include: Broadsword, Butterfly Swords, Staff, Monk's Spade, Double Gan, and Kwan Do.

=== Sparring Forms ===
Hasayfu Hung Gar incorporates sparring forms in the training not only to demonstrate the intended applications of the movements in the solo forms but also to bridge the gap between solo form practices and free sparring. These include Round Shield and Butterfly Sword versus the Trident, and Four-Gate Sparring Form, Staff vs. Butterfly Swords Sparing Form, Empty-Hand vs. Butterfly Swords Sparring Form, Trident vs. Round Shield and Butterfly Sword Sparring Form, and Three-Person Staff Sparring Form, Three-Person Weapon Sparring Form.

=== Iron Palm Training ===
In Hasayfu Hung Gar, Iron Palm Training is aimed at toughening the hands and increasing the striking power. Five different hand strikes are used in the training following the sequence: slap, backhand slap (a downward palm strike), knife-hand chop (a downward knife-hand strike), push (a snapping strike forward using the heel of the palm), and grab (includes both a strike and a pull with a tiger claw).
