= Yau Kung Moon =

Shaolin martial art

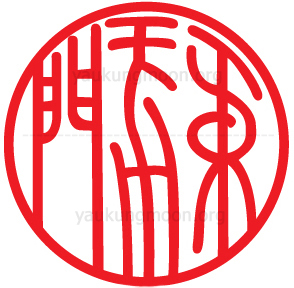
Yau Kung Moon Logo

Yau Kung Mun (also Yau Kung Moon) 柔功門 is a Shaolin martial art.

The Chinese term, 柔功門, can be roughly translated as 'the style of flexible power'. The Hong Kong and US schools usually use the romanization Yau Kung Moon or Yau Kung Mon, whereas the Australian schools use the romanization Yau Kung Mun.

== Origins ==
Yau Kung Mun martial arts were introduced to the public in 1924. Prior to that time, the history extends back into the Tang Dynasty (618–907 AD) in the Sil Lum Temple of Hunan province. The style was originated by a Buddhist monk named Ding Yang, who being very humble and withdrawn, gave no name to the style. The secrets of the style were selectively passed on to one disciple per generation within the confines of the Temple for hundreds of years into the Ching Dynasty (1644–1911 AD). When the Manchu conquered China to begin the Qing Dynasty, the officials and sympathizers of the former Ming emperor took refuge in the temples. To prevent attempts to restore the Ming to power, the Manchu emperor ordered the destruction of the temples. Many monks were killed, the rest fled; some to die of starvation. One surviving monk was Doe Sung. Doe Sung was the principal disciple of Yau Kung Mun, and had been the chosen representative of the Temple to meet all challengers. Through Doe Sung, the style survived continuing to pass to only one disciple per generation. It was through the priest Teat Yun that the style was given its name, and was presented to the public by accepting as his disciple the first lay person in Yau Kung Mun history, Grandmaster Ha Hon Hung.

Grandmaster HA Han Hong was a native of Ko Ming County, Kwangtung Province, China. He received a good family education and became a distinguished leader due to his comprehension of martial arts. As a young boy, he met Teat Yun who was traveling throughout southern China. Grandmaster HA was accepted as a student after rigorous testing to assess his character. Testing continued throughout his early training until he became a disciple. He learned the secrets of the style and Chinese orthopedics. Upon completing his training, Grandmaster HA was given the task to spread Yau Kung Moon and use his knowledge and skills to help humanity as his master returned to Sil Lum Temple.

In 1924, Grandmaster HA set up his first school in Kwangtung, China. Due to his Chinese medicine skills, Grandmaster HA became very famous. In 1936, he was an instructor and physician for the Command of the Military Police team which won the Kwangtung Provincial Martial Arts Championships. During War II, Grandmaster HA set up ambulance teams for Canton under guidance of the Red Cross for the League of Nations.

He continued to enrich his skills until the Communists took over China in 1949. He relocated and established a second school in Hong Kong. Due to his humbleness and contributions of public service, Grandmaster HA was highly regarded in the martial arts circle. With Grandmaster HA dying in 1965, the administration of training was left to his only disciple, his son, HA Kwok Cheung Sijo. At present, there are about fifteen schools in Hong Kong organized as the Hong Kong Yau Kung Moon Sports Association.

Ha Hon Hung opened up the first Yau Kung Mun Academy at the Pearl River Martial Arts Club in Guangzhou (Canton) and formed the Ha Hon Hung Sports Association. Yau Kung Mun primarily gained popularity in the Cantonese-speaking region of China, but remains somewhat uncommon outside of the region. It is taught in several countries but is most active in Guangzhou, Hong Kong, the US and Australia.

== Stylistic distinctions ==
The Yau Kung Mun System is representative of southern styles in being based on a low, stable horse stance. It employs many upper body techniques and most kicks are kept low. The YKM stance (Chien Gung Ma) resembles the familiar "ding gee ma" or Kung-Fu side horse but back arch is more pronounced and the shoulders are thrown forward with arms and hands protecting the chest and groin area. Defense is natural since the critical areas of the body are behind the protective wall of the shoulders and arms. Kicks or punches delivered within range of the practitioner would still be out of range of vital areas. This same stance also lends itself readily to offense as the arms are already in the attack position and the back leg has the distance of leverage required for powerful kicking.

Yau Kung Mun has both an external and internal training. However, like most other styles of Kung-Fu renowned for their internal power, the individual system's manifestation of internal power is still somewhat secretive. The majority of early forms are primarily external while the most advanced forms evolve into primarily internal. The external training consists of 13 fist and 28 weapon sets. Besides the 18 classical weapons (see the Eighteen Arms of Wushu), weapon sets using common farm implements (the hoe, long chair, spade, etc.) are also part of the system.

Forms of YAU KUNG MOON

- Tung Jee Kuen (Straight through fist) - this form teaches you to get into punching range. Contains some basic stancework (moving) and first level punching training.
- **Sup Jee Kuen** (Cross fist) - teaches you to stay in punching range, assists in short power development. This is different to other styles versions of sup jee.
- Ying Ching Kuen - contains a lot of dynamic tension, muscle building, external ging and rib training. This is a cleansing form (health), hard chi kung.
- **Sek Sze Kuen** (Rock lion form) - teaches short power, this is also known as Dai Sup Jee Kuen. Click on the name on the top right of this page to see a short section of this form.
- **Sum Mun Baqua** (Three door, eight directional fist) - teaches you stomping ging, attacking from the three doors, many finger strikes, much bridging and many charging techniques.
- Look Hup Kuen (Six co-ordinate fist) - three internal and three external co-ordinates. Has a variety of moves from the other forms, but has different angulations.
- **Day Sut Kuen** (Ground killing fist) - this is for grappling and take-downs. Some unusual kicking techniques.
- **Say Mun Baqua Kuen** (Four door, eight directional fist) - Second-longest form of YKM. Trains the chi and attacks the four doors. Unusual kicking techniques and seizing skills.
- Sum Mun Kuen (Three door fist) - attacks the three doors, has many charging and retreating techniques and follow-up skills, includes jumping kicks.
- Ly **Jik Bo Kuen** (Slide straight step punch) - linear but has advanced level training. This must be learnt before any of the high level forms, it is the foundation form of the system.
- **Ying Jow Lin Kuil** (Eagle claw continuous bridge) - seizing and bridging skills. Covers much ground with advanced footwork.
- **Ng Ying Kuen** (Five animal fist) - Uses the principles of the five animals (tiger, leopard, dragon, snake and crane).
- **Gau Bo Toi** (Nine step push) - one of the original Bak Mei forms. Develops Fau Chum Tung Tou.
- **Sup Batt Mor Kuil** (Eighteen devils bridge) - trains bridging skills. Develops Yau Kung (soft power). Another original Bak Mei form.
- **Mung Fu Chut Lum** (Fierce tiger exits the forest) - highest external level of the system. Uses quick evasive moves and stances. Trains wrist power (ging).
- Yau Kung Sup Baht Serng Toi Jerng (Yau Kung Mun 18 Step Push) The signature and quintessential form of the Yau Kung Mun system.

NOTE: Forms in Bold were incorporated from Pak Mei Kuen

== Yau Kung Mun organizations ==
Yau Kung Mun schools now exist in several countries. The main schools can be found in Hong Kong, Australia, United States, South America, Canada and Finland.

=== Hong Kong ===
The original organization started by Ha Hon Hung is operating in Hong Kong, China.

=== United States ===
During the 1960s, two of Grandmaster Ha Kwok Cheung's top disciples, Wong Cheung and Wan Tak Kei, immigrated to the United States from Hong Kong. Both Wong and Wan continued their training and teaching of the art - with Master Wong establishing a club in San Francisco and Master Wan creating a group in Los Angeles.

Since that time, both masters has taught thousands of students. Some of the oldest students from Wong and Wan include: Bill Lee, Loi Lok Fu, Lok Sang Lee, Michael Lau, David Louie, Kevin Quock, Dennis Lew and Bob Gin. In 2000, Sifu Lok Sang Lee promoted two of his students, Susan Yee and Richard Ow, to the rank of Sifu so that they can continue to teach this traditional style.

=== Australia ===
In the 1970s, Yau Kung Mun Australia was established by Leung Cheung (Chinese: 梁祥), a top disciple of Ha Hon Hung (夏漢雄). This association was one of the first Chinese martial arts associations to publicly perform Southern and Northern style Lion Dances in Australia.

Yau Kung Mun Australia is now led by Sifu James Leung (梁鉅), Percy To (杜偉明) and Sifu Garry Hearfield.

=== Canada ===
The Canadian branch of Yau Kung Moon was established by Master Wan in 2006. Naming two Sifu's Ryan S. and Ranie L. in Winnipeg, MB, Canada to carry on the tradition.

=== Finland ===
The Finland branch of Yau Kung Moon was run by Master To. His Sifu is Great Grand Master Ha Hon Hung's disciple in Guangzhou.
