= The Young Wong Fei Hung =

Chinese television series

The Young Wong Fei-hung (simplified Chinese: 少年黄飞鸿; traditional Chinese: 少年黃飛鴻; pinyin: shào nián huáng feī hóng) was a 30 episode TV series that aired in China in 2002.

== Plot ==
The series follows the growth of a teenage Huang Feihong (played by Ashton Chen) from being naughty to behaving like a man. During the first 5 episodes Huang Feihong is living in his hometown in Guangzhou, China. There he and his friend Lin Shilong, who was also his best friend and student in real life, goes along with him doing naughty things such as throwing a banana on the floor to deliberately trip a martial artist carrying a heavy statue, which almost smashed a little child. Huang also picks fights with other students in his school, especially the martial artist's son, who is a weak wimp. Later, Huang develops a friendship with the wimp. There are final bosses in each few episodes which can also be considered an arc. During the last arc, there is a final boss for the series.

== See also ==
- Wong Fei-hung filmography
