= Xiqiao, Guangdong =

Town in Foshan, China

Coordinates: 22.934464°N 112.964773°E

- Simplified Chinese: 西樵镇
- Traditional Chinese: 西樵鎮
Transcriptions
Standard Mandarin
- Hanyu Pinyin: Xīqiáozhèn
- Wade–Giles: Hsi-ch'iao-chen
Yue: Cantonese
- Jyutping: sai1 ciu4 zan3

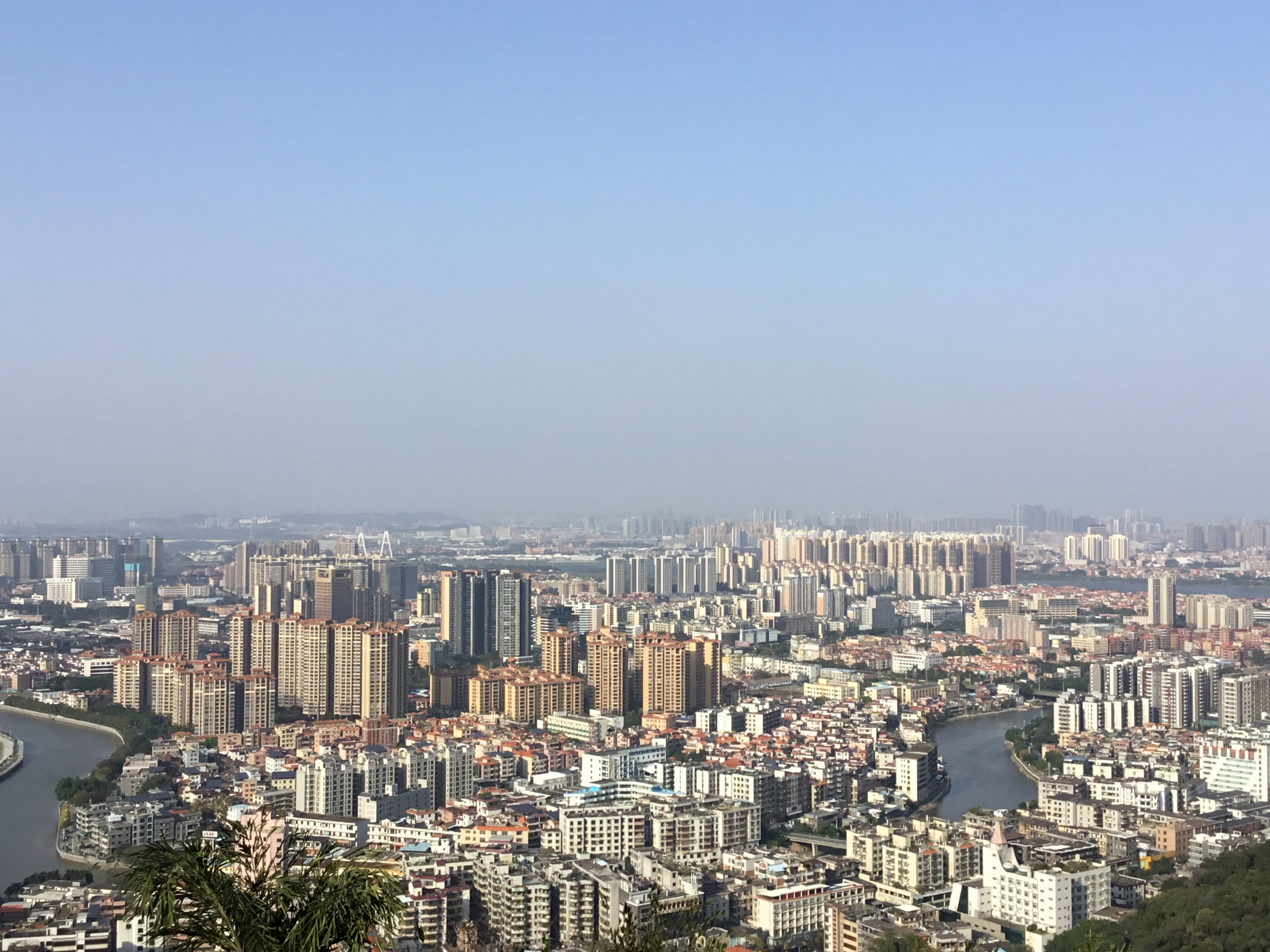
Xiqiao Town

Xiqiao Town (Chinese: 西樵镇) is a town in Nanhai District, Foshan, Guangdong, China. It covers an area of 176.63 square kilometres with registered population of 144,700 and floating population of 70,000. Tourism and textiles are the main industries in the town. Xiqiao Mountain (Chinese: 西樵山), a famous mountain and scenic spot in Southern Guangdong, is also located at Xiqiao.

== Tourism ==
Xiqiao Mountain is a scenic spot with a massive metallic sitting Buddha Statue, called the Nanhai Guanyin Bhusa. It can be reached by car or by a one-hour hike from the foot of the hill.

== See also ==
- Mount Danxia
- Mount Luofu
- Mount Xiqiao
