= Wong Fei-hung =

Chinese martial artist and physician (1847–1925)

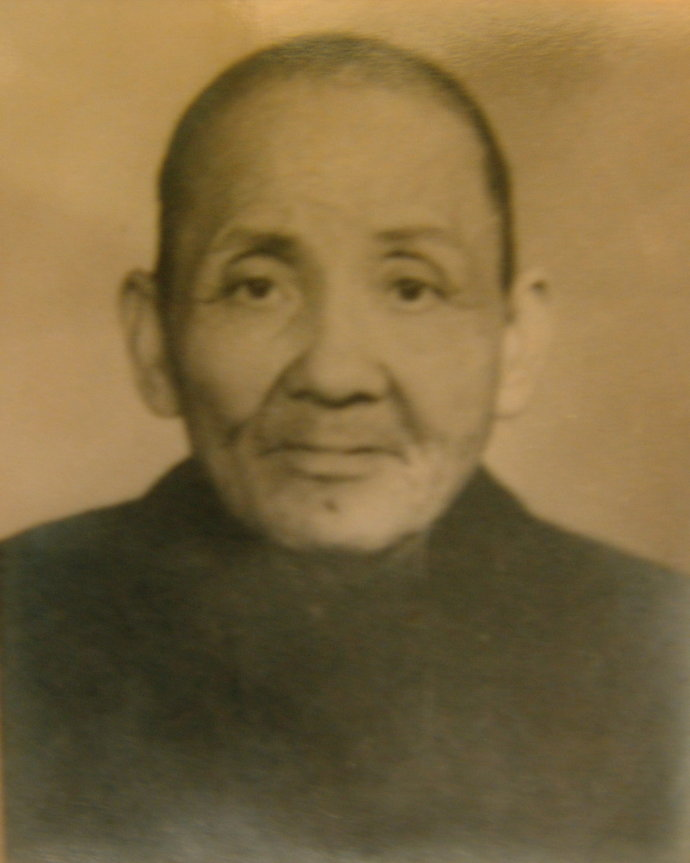
- Alleged photo of Wong Fei-hung by his disciple Kwong Kei-tim (鄺祺添), rediscovered in 2005
- Born: Wong Sek-cheung (黃錫祥); 9 July 1847; Luzhou Hamlet, Lingxi Village, Xiqiao Town, Nanhai, Foshan, Qing Empire
- Died: 17 April 1925 (aged 77); Chengxi Fangbian Hospital, Guangzhou, China
- Native name: 黃飛鴻
- Nationality: Chinese
- Style: Chinese martial arts Hung Ga, Drunken boxing
- Teachers: Wong Kei-ying; Lam Fuk-sing; Sung Fai-tong; So Chan
- Rank: Grandmaster

Other information
- Occupation: Martial artist, physician, revolutionary
- Spouse: Ms. Luo (m. 1871; died 1871) Ms. Ma (m. 1896, died) Ms. Cen (m. 1902, died) Mok Kwai-lan (m. 1915)
- Children: Wong Hon-lam (son), with Ms. Ma; Wong Hon-sam (son), with Ms. Ma; 2 daughters, with Ms. Ma; Wong Hon-syu (son), with Ms. Cen; Wong Hon-hei (son), with Ms. Cen
- Notable relatives: Wong Kei-ying (father); Pok Lai-ngor (mother)
- Notable students: Leung Foon; Lam Sai-wing; Dang Fong; Ling Wan-kai

Chinese name
- Traditional Chinese: 黃飛鴻
- Simplified Chinese: 黄飞鸿
Transcriptions
Standard Mandarin
- Hanyu Pinyin: Huáng Fēihóng
- Bopomofo: ㄏㄨㄤˊ ㄈㄟㄏㄨㄥˊ
- Wade–Giles: Huang Fei-hung
- IPA: [xwǎŋ féɪxʊ̌ŋ]
Yue: Cantonese
- Yale Romanization: Wòhng Fēi-hùhng
- Jyutping: Wong^{4} Fei^{1}-hung^{4}
- IPA: [wɔ̏ːŋ féihʊ̏ŋ]

Wong Sek-cheung (birth name)
- Traditional Chinese: 黃錫祥
- Simplified Chinese: 黄锡祥
Transcriptions
Standard Mandarin
- Hanyu Pinyin: Huáng Xīxiáng
- Wade–Giles: Huang Hsi-hsiang
Yue: Cantonese
- Jyutping: Wong^{4} Sek^{3}-coeng^{4}

Tat-wun (courtesy name)
- Traditional Chinese: 達雲
- Simplified Chinese: 达云
Transcriptions
Standard Mandarin
- Hanyu Pinyin: Dáyún
- Wade–Giles: Ta-yün
Yue: Cantonese
- Jyutping: Daat^{6}-wan^{4}

Wong Fei-hung (born Wong Sek-cheung with the courtesy name Tat-wun; 9 July 1847 – 17 April 1925) was a Chinese martial artist, physician, and folk hero, who practiced in 19th century Guangzhou. Though he was considered an expert in the Hung Ga style of Chinese martial arts, his real public fame was as a physician who practiced and taught acupuncture, Dit Da (Chinese chiropractics) and other forms of traditional Chinese medicine in the (now closed) Po Chi Lam (寶芝林; 宝芝林; Bǎozhīlín; Bou^{2}-zi^{1}-lam^{4}), a medical clinic in Guangzhou. Two museums dedicated to him were built in his birthplace in Foshan, Guangdong.

Wong has been the subject of numerous martial arts films and television series, most notably the Once Upon a Time in China film series (1991–1997) by Tsui Hark. He has been portrayed by several stars of Hong Kong and Chinese cinema, including Gordon Liu, Jackie Chan, Kwan Tak-hing, Jet Li, Vincent Zhao, and Sammo Hung. The Wong Fei-hung film series holds the Guinness World Record for the longest-running film series and most films in a movie series.

The most famous depictions of Wong Fei-hung in cinema include Jackie Chan in Drunken Master (1978) and Drunken Master II (1994), Jet Li in Once Upon a Time in China (1991) and Once Upon a Time in China II (1992), and Angie Tsang in Iron Monkey (1993).

== Other names ==
Wong's original given name was Sek-cheung or Xixiang (锡祥; 錫祥; Xīxiáng; Hsi-hsiang; Sek^{3}-coeng^{4}) before it was changed to Fei-hung (Feihong). His courtesy name was Dat-wan or Dayun (达云; 達雲; Dáyún; Ta-yun; Daat^{6}-wan^{4}).

== Life ==
Wong was born in Luzhou Hamlet, Lingxi Village, Xiqiao Country, Foshan, Nanhai County, which is a present day part of Foshan. His ancestral home was in Luzhou Hamlet, Lingxi Village, Xiqiao Country, Foshan, Nanhai County, Canton Prefecture, Guangdong Province, which is now part of Xiqiao Town, Nanhai District, Foshan.

At the age of five, Wong started learning Hung Ga from his father, Wong Kei-ying. He often accompanied his father on trips from Foshan to Guangzhou, the provincial capital of Guangdong Province, where his father peddled medicine and performed martial arts in the streets. When he was 13, he encountered Lam Fuk-sing (林福成; Lin Fucheng), an apprentice of "Iron Bridge Three" Leung Kwan, in Douchi Street in Foshan Town. Lam taught him how to use the sling and the essential moves of the martial art Iron Wire Fist. Later, he learned the shadowless kick from Sung Fai-tong (宋輝鏜; Song Huitang). Wong Fei-hung was very personable like his father, and made many friends in the martial arts and medical worlds, like the 10 Tigers of Guangdong. With these friendships and chance meetings, he was exposed to vast amounts of knowledge that were openly shared with him. He was able to enhance his father's teachings to formulate a style that included much of what is seen in Southern Chinese Styles today.

In 1863, Wong started a martial arts school in Shuijiao (水腳) in Saikwan (Xiguan), which is the present-day location of Liwan District, Guangzhou. His students were mainly metal labourers and street vendors. In 1886, Wong opened his family's medical clinic, Po Chi Lam (寶芝林; Baozhilin), in Ren'an (仁安), which is the present-day part of Xiaobei Road, Yuexiu District, Guangzhou City.

In 1912, the First Chinese Republic was established following the official collapse of the Qing regime. During the chaotic early years of the Republican era, many businessmen who operated places of entertainment in Guangzhou decided to hire guards (or bouncers) to protect their businesses on-site in case trouble broke out. As Wong was trained in martial arts, he was hired by various businesses to be one of such guards.

In 1919, when the Chin Woo Athletic Association opened a branch in Canton, Wong was invited to perform at the opening ceremony. In the same year, Wong Hon-sam, one of Wong's sons, who was working as a bodyguard in Wuzhou, Guangxi, was murdered by a rival known as "Devil Eye" Leung (鬼眼梁), who was apparently jealous that Wong Hon-sam was better than him in martial arts. Wong was so affected by this incident that he stopped teaching his other sons martial arts.

Between August and October 1924, Wong's medical clinic, Po Chi Lam, was destroyed when the Nationalist government was suppressing the uprising by the Guangzhou Merchant Volunteers Corps. Wong felt so dejected and saddened by the loss of Po Chi Lam that he fell into depression and became ill. He died from illness on 17 April 1925 in Chengxi Fangbian Hospital (城西方便醫院), which is the present day location of the Guangzhou First People's Hospital (廣州市第一人民醫院) at Panfu Road in Guangzhou's Yuexiu District. He was buried at the foot of Baiyun Mountain.

Wong's fourth wife, Mok Kwai-lan, and his sons, along with his students Lam Sai-wing and Dang Sai-king (鄧世瓊; Deng Shiqiong), moved to Hong Kong and opened martial arts schools there.

Wong's grave location is currently unknown. It is believed that his grave, along with others within the cemetery were long expunged for future developments.

== Fighting style ==
Wong was a master of Hung Ga. He systematised the predominant style of Hung Ga and choreographed its version of the Tiger Crane Paired Form Fist, which incorporates his Ten Special Fist techniques. Wong is famous for using the Shadowless Kick. He named the techniques of his skills when he performed them.

Wong was adept at using weapons, such as the staff and southern tiger fork. One tale, possibly fictional, recounts how Wong defeated a group of 30 gangsters on the docks of Guangzhou with a staff.

Among Wong's students, the more notable ones include Lam Sai-wing (林世榮; Lin Shirong), Leung Foon (梁寬; Liang Kuan), Dang Fong (Deng Fang), and Ling Wan-kai (凌雲階; Ling Yunjie).

Wong is sometimes incorrectly identified as one of the "Ten Tigers of Canton". His father, Wong Kei-ying, was one of the ten but Wong himself was not. Wong is also sometimes referred to as the "Tiger after the Ten Tigers".

According to a folklore, So Chan also taught Wong Fei-hung in drunken boxing.

== Family ==
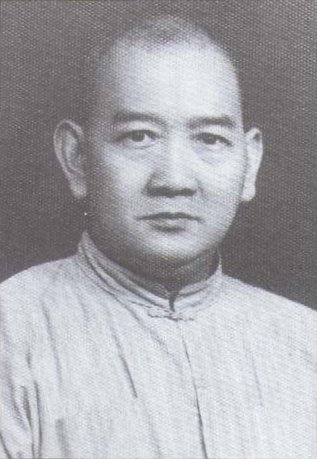
The man in this photograph was alleged to be Wong Fei-hung, but was later confirmed to be actually Wong's fourth son, Wong Hon-hei.

After his first wife died of illness in 1871, Wong was widowed for 25 years. In 1896, he married his second wife and had two sons and two daughters with her. Some time after she died of illness, Wong remarried again in 1902. His third wife bore him two sons before falling victim to a deadly illness. His fourth and final wife stayed with him from 1915 up till his death. The personal names of his first three wives are unknown. He had four known children.

Spouses

- Wong's first wife was surnamed "Lo" or "Law" (罗; 羅; Luó). She married Wong in 1871 and died of illness three months after their marriage.
- Wong's second wife was surnamed "Ma" (马; 馬; Mǎ). She married Wong in 1896 and died of illness. She bore Wong two sons and two daughters.
- Wong's third wife was surnamed "Sam" or "Sum" (岑; Cén). She married Wong in 1902 and died of illness. She bore Wong two sons.
- Wong's fourth wife, Mok Kwai-lan (莫桂兰; 莫桂蘭; Mò Guīlán), married Wong in 1915. She outlived him and died in Hong Kong on 11 March 1982. As Wong believed that his first three wives died because of a curse on him, he never took another formal spouse; Mok was actually his concubine in name.

Sons

- Wong Hon-syu (黄汉枢; 黃漢樞; Huáng Hànshū), born to Wong's third wife.
- Wong Hon-hei (黄汉熙; 黃漢熙; Huáng Hànxī), also born to Wong's third wife.
- Wong Hon-lam (黄汉林; 黃漢林; Huáng Hànlín), born to Wong's second wife.
- Wong Hon-sam (黄汉森; 黃漢森; Huáng Hànsēn), also born to Wong's second wife.

Daughters

At present, there is no information on Wong's two daughters.

Descendants

Wong had at least three grandsons and six granddaughters. His descendants currently live in Australia, Latin America and Southeast Asia.

== Legacy ==
In 1996, the Wong Fei-hung Lion Dance Martial Arts Museum was built in his hometown in Foshan.

A Wong Fei-hung Memorial Hall was built in 2000 and was officially opened in January 2001 in his honour in Foshan, Chancheng District. The exhibits cover his entire life, including his martial arts and medical careers. The hall contains a reconstruction of Po Chi Lam.

== Alleged photos ==
The first alleged photo was said to have been provided by his fourth spouse Mok Kwai-lan to Leung Ting of the Real Kung Fu (真功夫) magazine in 1976. Decades later, it was first exhibited at the Wong Fei-hung Memorial Hall in 2000 and was controversially seen and even promoted by martial artists as a photo of Wong Fei-hung. This was dismissed in 2009 by New Martial Hero's article that the man in the photo was of that of his fourth son, Wong Hon-hei.

In 2005, another alleged photo of Wong Fei-hung once taken by one of his students Kwong Kei-tim (鄺祺添) was discovered by the museum staff in Hong Kong. The man in the photo bears a close resemblance to his son, whose photo was the first to be often mistaken for his own father's back then. His fourth spouse Mok Kwai-lan once stated that her husband was quite superstitious and believed that having photos taken of oneself would shorten one's lifespan, so Wong only had one picture of himself taken in his lifetime, namely the one taken by his student Kwong.

== In popular culture ==
=== Film and television ===
Over 100 films and television series featuring Wong have been produced since 1949, mostly in Hong Kong. The Hong Kong actor Kwan Tak-hing starred as Wong in over 70 films between the 1940s and 1980s and earned himself the nickname "Master Wong". Other prominent actors who portrayed Wong on screen include Jet Li in the Once Upon a Time in China film series and Vincent Zhao in the television series Wong Fei Hung Series.

- List of notable Wong Fei-hung films:
  - Challenge of the Masters (1976), starring Gordon Liu.
  - Drunken Master (1978), starring Jackie Chan. Yuen Siu-tien co-starred as Beggar So.
  - Magnificent Butcher (1979), starring Kwan Tak-hing. Sammo Hung, Yuen Biao and Wei Pak co-starred as Wong's students Wing, Foon and Chik.
  - Martial Club (1981), starring Gordon Liu.
  - Once Upon a Time in China (1991), starring Jet Li. This is the first part of a series of six films on Wong Fei-hung. Vincent Zhao took over the role of Wong Fei-hung from Jet Li in two of the movies.
  - Great Hero from China (1992), starring Chin Kar-lok.
  - Iron Monkey (1993), starring Yu Rongguang as Iron Monkey and Donnie Yen as Wong Kei-ying. Angie Tsang appeared as a young Wong Fei-hung.
  - Last Hero in China (1993), starring Jet Li.
  - Drunken Master II (1994), starring Jackie Chan. Ti Lung co-starred as Wong Kei-ying.
  - Around the World in 80 Days (2004), Sammo Hung appeared briefly as Wong Fei-hung.
  - Rise of the Legend (2014), starring Eddie Peng.
- Television series:
  - Wong Fei Hung Series (1996) is a Hong Kong television series on five stories about Wong Fei-hung. The series was produced by Tsui Hark and starred Vincent Zhao as Wong Fei-hung. This television series is sometimes regarded as a television series counterpart to the Once Upon a Time in China films.
  - The Young Wong Fei Hung (2002) is a Chinese television series featuring Ashton Chen as young Wong Fei-hung.
  - Wong Fei Hung – Master of Kung Fu (2005) is a Hong Kong television series starring Bosco Wong.
  - Grace Under Fire (2011), a Hong Kong television series about Wong Fei-hung's concubine, Mok Kwai-lan.

=== Video games ===
- Wong is featured as a selectable companion to the main character Lex the Bookworm from the word-forming puzzle video game Bookworm Adventures 2, released in 2009 by Popcap Games. Wong has the ability to stun the enemy and powers Lex up every 4 turns. He is unlocked after Book 5, Chapter 3. In the game, his name is misspelled as "Wong Fei-Hong."
- Wong is introduced in 2017 as a playable character in The Curious Expedition, a video game released in 2015. In the game, he is an explorer competing with other great minds, and he uses martial arts instead of regular attack methods to fight enemies. He also appears in its sequel as one of the rival explorers.
- The characters of Lee Rekka in SNK's The Last Blade series and Master Huang in IGS's Martial Masters are based on Jet Li's portrayal of Wong Fei-hung in the Once Upon a Time in China film series.
- Fei Fong Wong, the lead character in the Square video game Xenogears, was named after Wong Fei-hung (his name being written the same in katakana as Wong's name is written). Another protagonist, Citan Uzuki, closely resembles Wong, being both a physician and martial artist dressed in traditional Chinese garments.

=== Theme song ===
The Chinese folk song "On the General's Orders" (将军令; 將軍令; Jiāng-Jūn-Lìng; Zoeng^{1}-Gwan^{1} Ling^{6}) is popularly associated with Wong Fei-hung because it was used as the theme song in various Wong Fei-hung movies. It was the opening theme of the 1978 film Drunken Master, starring Jackie Chan. In the Once Upon a Time in China film series, the song's title was changed to A Man Should Better Himself (男儿当自强; 男兒當自強; Nán-Ér-Dāng-Zì-Qiáng; Naam^{4}-Ji^{4}-Dong^{1}-Zi^{6}-Koeng^{4}). It was sung in Cantonese by George Lam and its lyrics were written by James Wong. Jackie Chan sang the song in Mandarin in the second film. The version "A Man Should Better Himself" is the best known rendition of the song to date.

A rearranged version was rewritten and sung by Dayo Wong as the theme song of Men Don't Cry.

=== Other appearances ===
- In Will Thomas' third mystery novel, The Limehouse Text, his Victorian detective Cyrus Barker trained in martial arts in Guangdong by Wong Fei-hung.
- Stan Sakai has mentioned his plans to include a character based on Wong Fei-hung in a future issue of his comic book Usagi Yojimbo.
- Wong Fei-hung is a character in the collectible card game Shadowfist."Wong Fei Hung migrated to the West Bank of the Philippines in the Cagayan Valley and left behind his family of Filipino blood. And until now, his family's traditional treatment as a Chinese - Filipino a Chinese herbal medicine continues until today. his last son in the Philippines his full name is Emmanuel Chan Borja Bataller. Emmanuel Chan Borja Bataller migrated to Davao in Mindanao of the Philippines in the 1920's.
- In Marvel Comics, Wong Fei-hung is shown to have been a previous Iron Fist and combined his powers with his Drunken Boxing to create the "Drunken Dragon Fist".

== See also ==
- Wong Kei-ying
- Ten Tigers of Canton
