= List of Hong Kong films of 1980 =

A list of films produced in Hong Kong in 1980:

== 1980 ==
Title	Director	Cast	Genre	Notes
1980
36 Deadly Styles	Joseph Kuo		Martial arts	
18 Secrets Of Kung Fu	Chan Hung Man			
18 Swirling Riders	Lin Fu Di			
Absolute Monarch	Stanley Siu Wing			
Another Spring	Lee Hang			
Awe Inspiring Weapon	Cheung Paang Yik			
Bat Without Wings (aka Wu yi bian fu)	Chor Yuen		Mandarin Martial Arts	
Battle Creek Brawl	Robert Clouse	Jackie Chan		
The Beasts	Dennis Yu Wan Kwong			
Beggars Have No Equal				
The Beloved Grass				
The Big Brawl	Robert Clouse	Jackie Chan, José Ferrer, Mako	Action / kung fu	
Blood Of The Dragon Peril				
By Hook or by Crook	Karl Maka	Sammo Hung, Dean Shek, Eric Tsang, Karl Maka	Action / kung fu / Comedy	
Crazy Crooks	Karl Maka	Dean Shek, Karl Maka	Comedy	
Encounters of the Spooky Kind	Sammo Hung	Sammo Hung, Chung Fat, Lam Ching Ying, Wu Ma, Chan Lung	Action / Kung fu / Comedy / Horror	
Laughing Times	John Woo	Dean Shek, Wong Wai, Karl Maka, Wu Ma	Comedy	
Lost Souls	Mou Tun-fei			
Two on the Road	Lei Chiu	Bryan Leung, Philip Ko, Wang Lung-wei	Martial arts	
Unbeaten 28	Joseph Kuo			
The Young Master	Jackie Chan	Jackie Chan, Yuen Biao, Shih Kien, Lily Li		
The Victim	Sammo Hung	Sammo Hung, Bryan Leung	Martial arts	
White Hair Devil Lady	Chang Hsin-yen	Paw Hee-ching, Henry Fong	Wuxia, romance	
