= List of Hong Kong films of 1985 =

This article lists feature-length Hong Kong films released in 1985.

== Box office ==
The highest-grossing Hong Kong films released in 1985, by domestic box office gross revenue, are as follows:

Highest-grossing films released in 1985
Rank	Title	Domestic gross
1	My Lucky Stars	HK$30,748,643
2	Twinkle, Twinkle, Lucky Stars	HK$28,911,851
3	Police Story	HK$26,626,760
4	Heart of Dragon	HK$20,335,429
5	Mr. Vampire	HK$20,092,129
6	Kung Hei Fat Choy	HK$18,418,994
7	Mr. Boo Meets Pom Pom	HK$17,089,402
8	Working Class	HK$16,931,337
9	Happy Ghost II	HK$16,602,480
10	Holy Robe of Shaolin Temple	HK$15,161,458

== Releases ==
Title	Director	Cast	Genre	Notes
1985
Affectionately Yours	Wong Ying Kit	Eric Tsang, Alan Tam, Maria Chung		
Carry On Doctors And Nurses	Anthony Chan	Lam Kin-ming, Amy Chan, Chen Lo-min		
Chase A Fortune	Liu Wai Hung	Liu Wai-hung, Wong Ching, Danny Lee Sau-yin		
Danger Has Two Faces	Alex Cheung	Bryan Leung, Chu Kong, Carroll Gordon		
Disciples of the 36th Chamber	Liu Chia-Liang	Liu Chia Hui, Hsiao Hou, Liu Chia-Liang	Action	
Exciting Dragon	Chiu Chung Hung	Bryan Leung		
The Flying Mr. B	Wong Jing	Kenny Bee, Cherie Chung, Loletta Lee		
For Your Heart Only	Raymond Fung	Mang Hoi, Ann Bridgewater, Leslie Cheung		
Friendly Ghost	Chan Chuen	John Shum, Eric Tsang, Wong Ching		
Funny Triple	Joe Cheung	Eric Tsang, Anthony Chan Yau, Goo Ga-Lau, Tien Niu, Shirley Kwan Suet-Lai, Yeung Hoi-Yi, Shrila Chun Wai-Man, Sally Kwok, Mama Hung, Tsui Oi-Sam, Carroll Gordon	Action Comedy	
Happy Ghost II	Clifton Ko Chi-sum	Raymond Wong, May Lo, Melvin Wong		
Heart of Dragon	Sammo Hung	Jackie Chan, Sammo Hung, Emily Chu	Action	
Illegal Immigrant	Chang Wan Ting	Ching Yung Cho, Wu Fu Cheng, Liao Chun Yu		
The Island	Leung Po-Chi	John Shum Kin-Fun, Ronald Wong Ban, Timothy Zao, Amy Kwok	Horror Drama	
The Isle of Fantasy	Michael Mak	Raymond Wong, Fennie Yuen, Loletta Lee, Ann Bridgewater	Fantasy comedy	
Kung Hei Fat Choy	Dean Shek	Dean Shek, Alan Tam, George Lam, Ann Bridgewater	Fantasy, drama	
Lucky Diamond	Yuen Cheung-yan	Anita Mui, Alex Man Chi-leung, Chen Szu-chia		
Mismatched Couples	Yuen Woo-ping	Yuen Woo-ping, Kenny Pérez, Shirley Tan		
Mr. Boo Meets Pom Pom	Wu Ma	Michael Hui, Richard Ng, John Shum		
Mr. Vampire	Ricky Lau	Lam Ching-ying, Ricky Hui, Chin Siu-ho	Comedy, action, horror	
Mummy Dearest	Ronny Yu	Alan Tam, Bill Tung, Tang Pik-wan		
My Name Ain't Suzie	Angie Chen	Patricia Ha, Anthony Wong, Deanie Ip		
My Lucky Stars	Sammo Hung	Sammo Hung, Jackie Chan, Yuen Biao	Action	
The Musical Singer	Dennis Yu	James Wong, Anita Mui, Russell Wong		
Ninja Terminator	Godfrey Ho	Richard Harrison, Hwang Jang Lee	Action	
Police Story	Jackie Chan	Jackie Chan, Brigitte Lin, Maggie Cheung	Action	
The Protector	James Glickenhaus	Jackie Chan, Danny Aiello, Roy Chiao	Action	American-Hong Kong co-production
Run Tiger Run	John Woo	Tsui Hark, Teddy Robin Kwan, Bin Bin	Comedy	
The Time You Need a Friend	John Woo	Yueh Sun, David Tao, Linda Liu Shui-chi	Comedy	
Those Merry Souls	Lau Kar-wing	Yuen Biao, Eric Tsang, Stanley Fung		
Twinkle, Twinkle Lucky Stars	Sammo Hung	Sammo Hung, Jackie Chan, Yuen Biao, Andy Lau	Action, comedy	
The Unwritten Law	Ng See-yuen	Andy Lau, Deanie Ip		
Why Me?	Kent Cheng	Chow Yun-fat, Kent Cheng, Olivia Cheng		
Women	Stanley Kwan	Chow Yun-fat, Cherie Chung Cho-hung, Cora Miao	Melodrama	
Working Class	Tsui Hark	Samuel Hui, Joey Wong, Tsui Hark, Teddy Robin, Ken Boyle,	Comedy	
Yes, Madam	Corey Yuen	Michelle Yeoh, Cynthia Rothrock, John Shum		
Young Cops	Qiu Jiaxiong	Tony Leung, Anita Mui, Lui Fong		
