= The Thirty Million Dollar Rush =

1987 Hong Kong film by Karl Maka

- Film poster
- Traditional Chinese: 橫財三千萬
- Simplified Chinese: 横财三千万
- Hanyu Pinyin: Hèng Cái Sān Qiān Wàn
- Jyutping: Waang4 Coi4 Saam1 Cin1 Maan6
- Directed by: Karl Maka
- Screenplay by: Karl Maka; Wellington Fung; Chang Kwok-tse
- Produced by: Karl Maka
- Starring: Karl Maka; Brigitte Lin; Paula Tsui; Eric Tsang; Lau Kar-leung; Angile Leung; Mark Cheng
- Cinematography: Bob Thompson; Andrew Lau
- Edited by: Tony Chow; Wong Ming-lam; Wong Ming-kong
- Music by: Alvin Kwok
- Production company: Cinema City & Films Co.
- Distributed by: Golden Princess Film Production
- Release date: 2 July 1987
- Running time: 96 minutes
- Country: Hong Kong
- Language: Cantonese
- Box office: HK$13,545,285

The Thirty Million Dollar Rush (Chinese: 橫財三千萬) is a 1987 Hong Kong action comedy film written, produced, directed by and starring Karl Maka. The film co-stars Brigitte Lin, Paula Tsui, Eric Tsang, Lau Kar-leung, Angile Leung and Mark Cheng.

This is a heist film, where a mint employee and his newly-formed gang scheme to steal bank notes from the mint.

== Plot ==
Fatty (Eric Tsang) is an employee at a mint, where one day, he discovers a shredding machine that crashed for a moment before resuming its operations. Because of that moment, an amount of HK$30 million of bank notes, which were meant to be shredded, survived. Discovering this secret, Fatty conspires with his friends, Tomboy (Angile Leung) and Mark Mark Cheng), to steal the money for themselves.

Seeking for professional help, the trio join forces with Baldy (Karl Maka), an ex-con recently released from prison. While discussing their plan, they were overheard by a Catholic nun, Sister Maria (Brigitte Lin), who is determined to prevent them from committing sins in order to save their souls.

== Cast ==
- Karl Maka as Baldy
- Brigitte Lin as Sister Maria
- Paula Tsui as Designer Fung
- Eric Tsang as Fatty
- Lau Kar-leung as Boxer Leung
- Angile Leung as Tomboy
- Mark Cheng as Mark
- Wong Ching as Inspector Chu
- John Woo as Ling's husband (cameo)
- Wong Jing as Pimp Tak (cameo)
- Amy Wu as Ling
- Chan Chi-fai as Whoremonger
- Eddie Chan as Whoremonger
- Maria Tung as TV reporter
- Chang Kwok-tse as Bicycle kiosk owner
- Joe Chu as Whoremonger
- Sai Gwa-Pau as Man in toilet
- Wellington Fung as Engineer
- Tony Chow as Fatty's assistant manager
- Garry Chan as Hawker assistant
- Ling Lai-man as Keung

== Theme song ==
- Dream of Fortune (橫財夢)
  - Composer: Alvin Kwok
  - Lyricist: Raymond Wong
  - Singer: Samuel Hui

== Reception ==
=== Critical ===
Andrew Saroch of Far East Films rated the film a score of three out of five stars and calls it an "enjoyable comedy mixes the familiar ingredients of fast-paced comedy, spurts of action and thin plot, alongside a cast of welcome faces" but criticizes the film for its lack of order and some over-the-top performances.

=== Box office ===
The film grossed HK$13,545,285 at the Hong Kong box office during its theatrical run from 2 to 17 July 1987.
