= List of Hong Kong films of 1981 =

A list of films produced in Hong Kong in 1981:

== 1981 ==
Title	Director	Cast	Genre	Notes
1981
All The Wrong Clues For The Right Solution	Tsui Hark	George Lam, Teddy Robin Kwan, Karl Maka	Comedy	
Ambitious Kung Fu Girl	Lu Chin Ku	Chen Kuan-tai, Michelle Yim, Lin Hsiu-chun		
Avengers From Hell	Pei-chuan Li	Tung-kua Ai, Man-Biu Bak, Philip Chan		
The Battle For The Republic Of China	Ting Shan-hsi	Ti Lung, Joan Lin, Ko Chun-hsiung		
Beware of Pickpockets	Wu Ma	Dean Shek, Karl Maka		
Bewitched	Kuei Chih-hung	Ai Fei, Melvin Wong, Chan Li-li	Horror	
The Big Boss Big	Li Zuonan	Wangguan Xiong, Yang Huishan, Yasuaki Kurata		
The Cannonball Run	Hal Needham	Jackie Chan, Michael Hui, Burt Reynolds, Roger Moore, Farrah Fawcett		
Chasing Girls	Karl Maka	Dean Shek Tin, Flora Cheung Tin-Oi, Nancy Lau Nam-Kai, Lau Si-Hong, Cheng Mang-Ha, Hui Ying-Ying, Chong Man-Ching, Wong Aau-Ngai, Tang Mei-Mei, Wong Man-Yee, Rebecca Chan Sau-Chu, Marylinn Wong Cho-Shut, Man Kit-Wan, Lucia Leung Bik-Ling, Leung Bo-Yee		
Dreadnaught	Yuen Woo Ping	Yuen Biao, Bryan Leung, Kwan Tak-hing, Yuen Shun-yi, Phillip Ko	Action	
Emperor and His Brother	Chor Yuen	Ti Lung, Lo Lieh, Pai Piao		
Masked Avengers	Chang Cheh	Chiang Sheng, Chu Ko, Chien Hsiao-hao		
My Young Auntie	Lau Kar-leung	Lau Kar-leung, Kara Hui, Hsiao Hou	Action	
The Prodigal Son	Sammo Hung	Sammo Hung, Yuen Biao, Lam Ching-ying		
Security Unlimited	Michael Hui	Samuel Hui, Michael Hui, Ricky Hui		
The Story of Woo Viet	Ann Hui	Chow Yun-fat, Lo Lieh, Cherie Chung		
Tower of Death	Ng See-yuen	Bruce Lee, Tong Lung, Huong Cheng-li	Action	
Wedding Bells, Wedding Belles	Yim Ho	Suet Lee, James Yi Lui, Lau Hak-Suen, Chan Lap-Ban, Lily Leung, Fung Shui-Chun, Yu Miu-Lin, Ying-Ying Hui, Fong Yue, Got Ping	Comedy, Drama	
