= Beware of Pickpockets =

1981 Hong Kong film by Wu Ma

- Film poster
- Traditional Chinese: 歡樂神仙窩
- Simplified Chinese: 欢乐神仙窝
- Hanyu Pinyin: Huān Lè Shén Xiān Wō
- Jyutping: Fun1 Lok6 San4 Sin1 Wo1
- Directed by: Wu Ma
- Screenplay by: Raymond Wong
- Produced by: Karl Maka
- Starring: Dean Shek; Karl Maka; Wu Ma
- Cinematography: Manny Ho
- Edited by: Tony Chow
- Music by: Frankie Chan
- Production company: Cinema City & Films Co.
- Distributed by: Golden Princess Amusement Co. Ltd
- Release date: 5 February 1981
- Running time: 91 minutes
- Country: Hong Kong
- Language: Cantonese
- Box office: HK$5,109,130

Beware of Pickpockets is a 1981 Hong Kong comedy film directed by Wu Ma and starring Dean Shek, Karl Maka and Wu.

== Plot ==
Righteous officer Big Nose Pau is ordered to arrest pickpocket Extra Hand. However, each time he was caught, he was released due to a lack of evidence. Although Extra Hand is a tricky man, he is actually a Robin Hood like pickpocket who steals dirty money from the rich to raise seven orphaned children that he adopted. Extra Hand plans to save money to build an orphanage for the children to live in.

Later, Extra Hand learns that his rival, Dog Lice, has robbed many jewels and therefore, Extra Hand planned to steal them from him.

After a major battle with Dog Lice and his gang, Extra Hand was caught by Pau. Although Pau was hesitant to arrest him, Extra Hand decides not to give a tough job for Big Nose and surrenders to him. However, seeing how Extra Hands is doing all this for the orphans, Pau decides to let him go.

== Cast ==
- Dean Shek as Extra Hand
- Karl Maka as Big Nose
- Wu Ma as Superintendent
- Annie Liu as Pau's sister
- Hon Kwok-choi as Dog Lice
- Cheung Ka-ho as Orphaned child
- Cheung Ying-wai as Orphaned child
- Cheng Ka-kai as Orphaned child
- Ha Wai-hong as Orphaned child
- Lok Wai-ming as Orphaned child
- Hui Yiu-wai as Orphaned child
- Kwok Po-keung as Orphaned child
- Tang Ching as Judge Koo Ming-lim
- Chic Lau as Superintendent's wife
- Wong Au-ngai as Lice's wife
- Tai San as Lice's gang member
- Ka Lee as Lice's gang member
- Pang Yun-cheung as Lice's gang member
- Ng Hon-keung as Lice's gang member
- Ho Pak-kwong as Mercy Tai
- Sze Kai-keung as House owner
- Che Hung as Medicine buyer
- Sai Gwa-Pau
- Lai Lok-ling
- Leung Hung
- Lau Chuen as Court clerk
- Raymond Wong as Dishonest Diner (cameo)
- Cheung Sek-au as House sub-letter

== Theme song ==
- Beware of Pickpockets (提防小手)
  - Composer: Joseph Koo
  - Lyricist: Raymond Wong, Cheng Kwok-kong
  - Singer: Dean Shek, Wah Wah Children Choir

== Box office ==
The film grossed HK$5,109,130 at the Hong Kong box office during its theatrical run from 5 to 18 February 1981 in Hong Kong.
