= Cinema City Enterprises =

Hong Kong film company

Cinema City Enterprises Co.
- Industry: Entertainment
- Founded: 1979; 47 years ago (as "Warriors Film Company")
- Founder: Raymond Wong; Karl Maka; Dean Shek
- Defunct: 1991; 35 years ago
- Fate: Renamed to Mandarin Films Ltd.
- Successor: Mandarin Films Ltd.
- Headquarters: Mei Foo Sun Chuen (1980-1989); Pioneer Centre, Mong Kok, Kowloon, British Hong Kong (1989-1991)
- Products: Motion pictures

Cinema City Enterprises Ltd (also known as Cinema Capital Entertainment and Cinema City Entertainment, formerly Cinema City and Films Co. and Cinema City Company Limited) was a company that specialised in Hong Kong Cinema. The company had a small catalogue of only 88 films. Their library covers genres including drama, comedy, horror.

The company was established in 1979 by actors Raymond Wong, Karl Maka and Dean Shek. The company was successful throughout the 1980s, but went into financial trouble around the early 1990s. Their last film was Blue Lightning in 1991, produced shortly before the company shut down. They were known for producing films such as A Better Tomorrow and Aces Go Places.

== History ==
In 1979, comedians Raymond Wong, Karl Maka, and Dean Shek founded the Warriors Film Company. The company produced early republic comedy kung fu films such as Crazy Partner (1979), Crazy Crooks (1980) and By Hook or by Crook (1980).

Prior to the Warriors Film Company, most of the Cantonese language films were produced by Shaw Brothers Studio and Golden Harvest with them controlling the distribution and availability of the films. In 1980, Golden Princess Amusement Co., Ltd, lacking its own sources of Cantonese language films for the Hong Kong market, invested in the Warriors Film Company to produce and ensure a supply of Cantonese language films for its own distribution and the company was renamed to Cinema City. In its first three years, Golden Princess Amusement invested more than HK$100 million in Cinema City. With the investment, Cinema City increased its film production from two to 10 in a year.

In 1981, Cinema City invited Tsui Hark, who was recommended by John Woo, to join them. Hark's previous films had critical success but fared poorly at the box office. His first film with Cinema City, All the Wrong Clues for the Right Solution, grossed HK$7,479,976 in making it the fourth highest grossing film in Hong Kong. The film also won the Golden Horse Award for Best Cinematography and Film Editing. It was also nominated for Best Art Direction and Best Feature. Hark also won Best Director at the 1981 Golden Horse Awards. The film successfully led the company on to new film genres outside of its early day genre of early republic comedy kung fu films. In November 1981 or in 1982, Hark's wife, Nansun Shi, joined Cinema City, as its executive director and was part of the seven core members of the company.

From 1981 to 1990, the seven core members of Cinema City (Maka, Shek, Wong, Shi, Eric Tsang, Teddy Robin and Hark) would gather nightly at Maka's house, located at Mei Foo Sun Chuen, to produce ideas and scripts for the company.

In 1981, Cinema City started producing Aces Go Places. Chow Yun-fat was initially selected as one of the main leads for the film but the company was afraid of his tight filming schedule. Hark then recommended Sam Hui to replace Chow. Hui demanded HK$2 million in acting fees at a time when the budget for a small film was HK$1 million. With approval from Golden Princess Amusement, Hui played one of the main leads. A major production for the company, Maka was the other male main lead with cameos by Shek, Wong and Hark and Taiwanese actress Sylvia Chang, who had just won Best Actress at the 18th Golden Horse Awards, as its main female lead. Aces would grossed HK$27.0 million on a budget of HK8 million. Tickets equivalent to 40 per cent of Hong Kong’s population were sold to watch the film. Maka also won Best Actor at the 2nd Hong Kong Film Awards in 1983. Chang would then also join Cinema City as its head producer and Taiwan representative of the company. In 1984, Woo took over as the Taiwan representative.

In 1985, Cinema City and PolyGram Records formed record label Cinepoly Records. In 1986, Hark provided the funding for Woo to film a longtime pet project, A Better Tomorrow (1986). The story of two brothers—one a law enforcement officer, the other a criminal—was a financial blockbuster. A Better Tomorrow became a defining achievement in Hong Kong action cinema.

In 1988, Cinema City reached its peak with The Eighth Happiness, a comedy film surrounding three brothers, directed by Johnnie To. The film grossed HK$37,090,776 at the Hong Kong box office during its theatrical run from 11 February to 30 March 1988 and was the top-grossing film of 1988 in Hong Kong and the highest-grossing film in Hong Kong at the time.

In 1990, after the seven core members started their independent filming projects, Cinema City split into four entities, Cinema City, Cinema City Enterprises / Cinema Capital Entertainment and Cinema City Entertainment. The main Cinema City company was managed by Wong who later restructured it into Mandarin Films Limited. Cinema City Enterprises / Cinema Capital Entertainment was managed by Maka but the company closed down as he retired soon after the split. Cinema City Entertainment was managed by Shek but like Maka, the company closed down soon as Shek retired in 1992.

In 2017, the seven core members of Cinema City were invited as award presenters at the 36th Hong Kong Film Awards (Hark was absent due to matters) and the 54th Golden Horse Awards.

== List of films ==
Release date	Title	Co-production with	Distributor	Notes
1979	Crazy Partner			Produced under Warriors Films
14 February 1980	Crazy Crooks			Produced under Warriors Films
7 August 1980	By Hook or by Crook		Bo Ho Film Company Ltd	Produced under Warriors Films
24 December 1980	Laughing Times		Self distributed	
23 July 1981	All the Wrong Clues for the Right Solution		Golden Princess Amusement Co. Ltd	
5 February 1981	Beware of Pickpockets		Golden Princess Amusement Co. Ltd	
7 August 1981	Chasing Girls		Golden Princess Amusement Co. Ltd	
16 January 1982	Aces Go Places		Self distributed	
15 July 1982	It Takes Two		Self distributed	
25 February 1982	Can't Stop The War (大追击)			
5 August 1982	He Lives by Night (夜惊魂)			
5 February 1983	Aces Go Places II		Self distributed	
31 March 1983	All the Wrong Spies (我爱夜来香)			
30 July 1983	Papa, Can You Hear Me Sing			Taiwanese film
5 August 1983	The Perfect Wife?!		Self distributed	
15 December 1983	Esprit d'amour		Golden Princess Amusement Co. Ltd	
1983	Send in the Clowns (台上台下)			Also known as Cabaret Tears

=== 1984 ===
- Aces Go Places III directed by Tsui Hark and Corey Yuen
- Banana Cop directed by Leong Po Chih
- Happy Ghost directed by Clifton Ko
- Heaven Can Help directed by David Chiang Da Wei
- The Occupant directed by Ronny Yu Yan Tai
- Run Tiger Run directed by John Woo
- A Family Affair directed by Dean Shek Tin

=== 1985 ===
- For Your Heart Only directed by Raymond Fung Sai Hung
- Love, Lone Flower directed by Lin Ching-Chieh
- Happy Ghost II directed by Clifton Ko Chi Sum
- The Isle Of Fantasy directed by Michael Mak Tong Kit
- Kung Hei Fat Choy directed by Dean Shek Tien
- Mismatched Couples directed by Yuen Woo Ping
- Mummy Dearest directed by Ronny Yu Yan Tai
- The Time You Need A Friend directed by John Woo
- Working Class directed by Tsui Hark
- Cupid One directed by Ringo Lam
- Why Me? directed by Kent Cheng

=== 1986 ===
- Aces Go Places IV directed by Ringo Lam
- A Better Tomorrow directed by John Woo
- A Book Of Heroes directed by Kevin Chu
- Happy Ghost III directed by Johnnie To
- The Thirty Million Dollar Rush directed by Karl Maka
- True Colours directed by Kirk Wong Chi Keung
- Peking Opera Blues directed by Tsui Hark

=== 1987 ===
- A Better Tomorrow II directed by John Woo
- City On Fire directed by Ringo Lam
- Evil Cat directed by Dennis Yu Wan Kwong
- Lady in Black directed by Sun Chung
- The Legend Of Wisely directed by Teddy Robin Kwan
- Prison On Fire directed by Ringo Lam
- Seven Years Itch directed by Johnnie To
- Trouble Couples directed by Eric Tsang

=== 1988 ===
- The Big Heat directed by Andrew Kam Yeung Wah, Johnnie To, Tsui Hark
- City War directed by Sun Chung
- The Eighth Happiness directed by Johnnie To
- Fatal Love directed by Leong Po Chih
- Fractured Follies directed by Wong Chung
- Gunmen directed by Kirk Wong Chi Keung
- School on Fire directed by Ringo Lam
- Tiger on the Beat directed by Lau Kar Leung
- All About Ah Long directed by Johnnie To

=== 1989 ===
- Aces Go Places V directed by Lau Kar Leung
- They Came to Rob Hong Kong directed by Clarence Fok
- Triads - The Inside Story directed by Taylor Wong Tai Loy
- Web Of Deception directed by David Chung Chi Man

=== 1990 ===
- Chicken a la Queen directed by Lee Hon To
- The Fun, the Luck & the Tycoon directed by Johnnie To
- A Killer's Blues directed by Raymond Lee Wai Man
- Skinny Tiger, Fatty Dragon directed by Lau Kar Wing
- Tiger on the Beat 2 directed by Lau Kar Leung
- The Dragon from Russia directed by Clarence Fok
- Undeclared War directed by Ringo Lam

=== 1991 ===
- The Raid directed by Tony Ching Siu Tung and Tsui Hark
- Prison On Fire II directed by Ringo Lam
- Royal Scoundrel directed by Jonathan Chik Gei Yee and Johnnie To
- Blue Lightning directed by Raymond Lee Wai Man (last movie)
