= Tang Kee-chan =

Hong Kong actor, singer and radio personality

- Born: 17 February 1912; Guangdong, China
- Died: 2 July 1991 (aged 79); Los Angeles, California, United States
- Occupation(s): actor, singer, radio personality, screen writer

Chinese name
- Traditional Chinese: 鄧寄塵
- Simplified Chinese: 邓寄尘
Transcriptions
Standard Mandarin
- Hanyu Pinyin: dèng jì chén
Yue: Cantonese
- Jyutping: dang6 gei3 can4

Tang Kee Chan (Chinese: 鄧寄塵, 17 February 1912 – 2 July 1991) was a Hong Kong actor, singer and radio personality. He is often referred to as the "King of Comedy (諧劇大王)" which is a moniker given to him by the Hong Kong entertainment industry as evidenced by his profile in the 'Historical Dictionary of Hong Kong Cinema' by Lisa Stokes, Tang's official profile at Avenue of Stars and a radio broadcast titled '60 Years of Broadcasting - The Most Memorable Moments' by Radio Television Hong Kong.

He is known in the radio broadcasting industry for voicing and playing up to eight to nine different roles for his story telling show and also for starring as part of a comedic duo (The Two Fools) with Sun Ma Sze Tsang in a series of films.

== Career ==
Tang had his start in his native Guangdong as a radio broadcaster before travelling to Hong Kong after being recruited by Rediffusion Television. He specialized in comedy and used up to eight to nine different voices and roles in his story telling show titled 'Tang Kee Chan's Comedy Show'. His characters ranged in age from small children to old citizens and included members of both genders.

He branched out into the film industry in 1950 and starred in over 100 films. He also wrote the screen plays for some of the films including "The Feuds between Huang Tangjing and Chen Mengji" in which he co-starred with opera singer, Sun Ma Sze Tsang.

Tang forged a partnership with Sun Ma Sze Tsang and starred with him in a series of films as the comedic duo known as "The Two Fools". Tang played the fool while Sun Ma Sze Tsang played the smarter member of the duo. Their disagreements were often improvised and comedic.

In 1963, Chubby Checker held two concerts in Hong Kong. Under contract with Diamond Records, Tang was asked to perform with Checker. Owing to the language barrier, Diamond Records decided to re-write Pat Boone's Speedy Gonzales where Chubby sung in English while Tang replaced the English spoken parts with Cantonese dialogue. Because of the success seen during the performances, a version of this song was recorded in 1965 with The Fabulous Echoes singing in English while Tang reprised his speaking role in Cantonese.

On 30 May 1963, Patti Page had two performances in Hong Kong to which Tang was a supporting act along with The Fabulous Echoes.

In 1975, he immigrated to Canada and would occasionally travel back to Hong Kong to cameo in films such as Chasing Girls, All the Wrong Clues for the Right Solution, Behind the Yellow Line, Happy Ghost II, and The Isle of Fantasy.

Tang has a plaque at the Avenue of Stars, Hong Kong which honours outstanding contributors to the Hong Kong Film Industry much like the Hollywood Walk of Fame. He is commemorated as number 29.

In 2009, Tang was recognized as one of seventy-three significant contributing members to the Hong Kong Film Industry in a website created by DotAsia and Radio Television Hong Kong which celebrates 100 years of Hong Kong Films.

== Music ==
Tang Kee-chan started recording albums as early as 1956. Cantonese singers whom he partnered include Cheng Gwan-min (鄭君綿), Cheng Pik Ying (鄭碧影), Cheng Kwok Bo (鄭幗寶), Law Lai Kuen (罗丽娟), Lam Dan (林丹), Lee Bo-Ying (李寶瑩) and Ng May Ying (吳美英). His songs are mainly the humorous type.

== Personal life ==
He had five children, none of whom followed in their father's footsteps into the entertainment industry. Third son, Professor Tang Siu Wa (鄧兆華) was a Professor and Chairman of Psychiatry at the University of California, Irvine and later, Chair Professor at the Department of Psychiatry in the University of Hong Kong Medical School before his retirement in 2008.

In 1991, Tang died from emphysema in Los Angeles, California, at the age of 79. As most of his descendants reside in Toronto, Canada, he was flown there for his funeral rites and subsequent burial.

== Filmography ==
=== Film ===
Year	Title	Role
1950	Five Blessings in a Row	Ka-fook
1950	The Great Idler	
1950	The Blundering Couple	Chow Wai-kung
1951	A Star of Mischief	Fan Dou
1951	The Conmen	
1951	The Scatterbrain	Yu Tau-wan
1951	The Story of Afu	
1951	Dragon Rising	
1951	Daddy and Sonny	
1952	Three Good Fellas	
1952	A Perfect Match	
1952	A Comet of Laughter Lands on Earth	
1952	A Fool on Honeymoon	
1952	Master Adou, a Native of Darling	
1952	Intoxication of a Spring Night	
1952	All the Love Heaven Allows	
1953	Tender Love	
1953	Fortune Shines Down	
1953	Honour Your Foster-Mother	
1953	A Cadet in Love's Battle	
1953	Peace to All Generations	
1954	The Miserable Couple	Peter
1955	An Actor's Struggle	
1955	Mr. Wang and Fatty Chen	Mr. Wang
1955	Crossroads	
1955	The Pauper-Prince	
1955	Romance in the West Chamber	
1955	Fleeting Riches	
1955	Snow White and the 7 Dwarves	
1955	The True Story of Siu Yuet-Pak Part 1	
1955	The True Story of Siu Yuet-Pak Part 2	
1955	Love and Hate	
1956	Wu Song's Bloody Fight on Lion's Bower	Mo Tai Lung
1956	Lovers' Eternal Union	
1956	Funny Girl	
1956	The Smart Girl	
1957	How Fang Tangjing Exasperated the Government Official	
1957	The Feuds Between Fang Tanfgjing and Chen Mengji	
1957	Loving Enemies	
1958	Two Fools in Paradise	
1958	The Rickshaw Puller Wins a Pretty Girl	
1958	Two Fools in Hell	
1958	The Sweep-Stakes Seller	
1958	The Merry Phoenix	
1958	A Patriot's Sword	
1959	Two Fools Capture the Criminal	
1959	A Fool in the Army	Ah Sau/Cheung Sau
1959	Two Fools Capture a Ghost	Lee Luk
1959	Two Good-for-Nothings	
1959	The Spendthrift Son in the Underworld	Master Wong
1959	Chances for Love	
1959	The Broom Spirit	
1959	Battle of the Sexes	
1959	Lucky Ones Up to Mischief	
1959	Peace to Man and Wife	
1959	Funny Misunderstanding	
1959	Love Under the Festival Lanterns	
1960	A Wonderful Dream	Wong Luk
1960	Silly Wong Growing Rick	
1960	Much Ado about Nothing	
1960	Every Cloud Has a Silver Lining	
1960	They All Say I Do	
1961	Non-sensical Son-in-Law	
1961	Unexpected Fortune	
1961	Installment on Marriage	
1962	Heart to Heart	
1962	The Swordswoman and Her 7 Partners (Part 1)	
1962	Thief Captures Thief	
1962	The Strange Lady Xue Yiniang	
1962	How Shui Guanyin Thrice Tricked Bai Jinlong	
1962	Our Adopted Daughter	
1962	A Couple in Cold War	
1962	The Swordswoman and Her 7 Partners (Part 2)	
1963	The Wonderful Years	
1963	Take the Money and Run	
1963	Hire a Wife	
1963	Joy to the World	
1964	The Bride Who Lives Under the Staircase	Chen Ding
1964	Bitter Love	
1964	Take What You Can	
1964	The Teacher Who Knows Everything	
1964	Sword of Justice	
1964	A Gambler Who Pawns His Wife	
1964	Assassination of the Prince (Part 2)	
1964	Husband of the Back Alley	
1964	An Anxious Bride	
1964	Grab What You Can!	
1964	In Search of a Father	
1964	Half a Bed	
1964	Love Thy Neighbors	
1965	The Maid Who Sells Dumplings	
1965	A Modern Ji Gong	
1965	Country Boy Goes to Town	
1965	A Modern Monkey King	
1965	A Tough World	
1965	The Immature Bunch	
1965	All Packed in a Small House	
1965	May Luck be with You	
1966	I Want You	
1981	All the Wrong Clues	Yummy
1981	Chasing Girls	Fa's father
1982	Dragon Force	Ah Chu
1984	Behind the Yellow Line	Building Security guard
1985	The Isle of Fantasy	Duncan Tang
1985	Happy Ghost II	Uncle Tang

=== Writer ===
Year	Title
1951	The Scatterbrain
1951	The Story of Afu
1951	A Star of Mischief
1951	Daddy and Sonny

=== Producer ===
Year	Title
1958	Two Fools in Hell
