= Nansun Shi =

Hong Kong filmmaker (1951–2026)

- 施南生
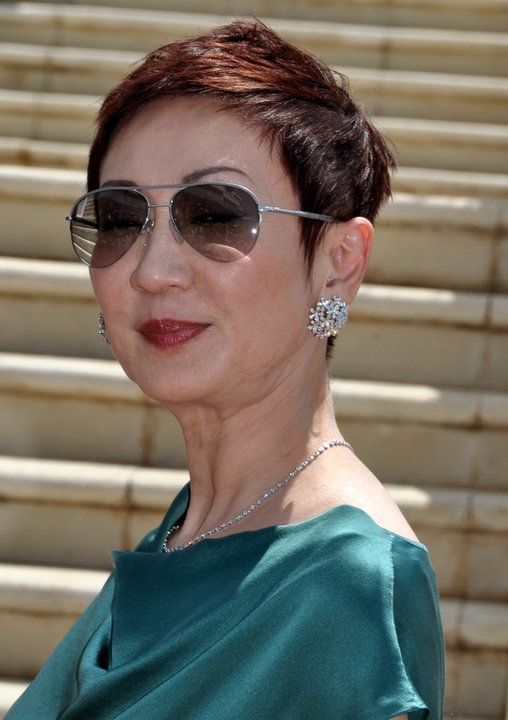
- Shi at the 2011 Cannes Film Festival
- Born: Shi Nan-Sun; 8 August 1951; British Hong Kong
- Died: 13 July 2026 (aged 74); Happy Valley, Hong Kong
- Education: Polytechnic of North London
- Occupations: Film producer; presenter; executive
- Known for: Filmmaking
- Spouse: Tsui Hark (m. 1996; div. 2014)

Nansun Shi (Chinese: 施南生; born Shi Nan-sun; 8 August 1951 – 13 July 2026) was a Hong Kong film producer and executive, known for her long-time partnership with filmmaker Tsui Hark, with whom she co-founded Film Workshop. She also helped establish the Chinese Television Network, worked for Hong Kong Telecom, and served as vice president of the Media Asia Entertainment Group.

== Early life ==
Shi was born in British Hong Kong on 8 August 1951, into a wealthy family. Her father, originally from Chongming Island, was a businessman who made his fortune in South Africa. After completing Form 4 at Maryknoll Convent School, she was sent to South Africa during the 1967 Hong Kong riots. Unwilling to enter the international school there as her father wished, she went to the UK for further education and earned a bachelor's degree in computer statistics from the Polytechnic of North London.

== Career ==
Upon graduation, Shi returned to Hong Kong, where she began working at a public relations agency. She soon decided to pursue a career in the local television industry. Shi worked at Television Broadcasts Limited (TVB), Commercial Television (CTV)—where she met co-worker Tsui Hark—and Rediffusion Television (RTV), where she was promoted to Assistant Controller in Administration and Budget of Channel One in 1981.

After Tsui joined Cinema City in 1981 to shoot All the Wrong Clues (1981), Shi was offered a position as the studio's managing director in November of that year. At Cinema City, Shi became one of the core members of the team called the "Team of Seven". Nicknamed "The Housekeeper" for her managerial skills, she was responsible for various aspects of production, as well as the growth of the studio's overseas distribution. She was an associate producer for many of Cinema City's films, such as Till Death Do We Scare (1982), Aces Go Places II (1983), and Esprit d'amour (1983).

In 1984, Shi and Tsui founded a new production company called Film Workshop. She handled production duties for the new studio, including budgeting and casting. Despite Film Workshop's existence, Shi remained with Cinema City until June 1987. Afterwards, she helped with the development of various television networks in Hong Kong. In 1991, she joined Yu Pun-hoi to establish the Chinese Television Network, and she joined Hong Kong Telecom in 1999 to develop its pay-TV services.

At the invite of Peter Lam, Shi joined Media Asia Entertainment Group in 2002 as vice president. She was an executive producer on Infernal Affairs (2002). While she left her position at Media Asia in 2003, she remained as a senior advisor to the company. From 2006 to 2012, Shi served as chairman of the board at Bona Film Group, where she produced various movies like The Great Magician and A Simple Life (both 2011). In 2008, Shi was appointed as the managing director for Irresistible Films, a film fund established by Avex Inc., producer William Kong, and financier Hugh Simon. She also continued to work as a producer under the Film Workshop banner, overseeing some of Tsui's films like Detective Dee and the Mystery of the Phantom Flame (2010). Shi briefly joined Phoenix Television in 2012 as a host for a political commentary programme. In 2017, she was invited to join the producers branch of the Academy of Motion Picture Arts and Sciences.

== Personal life and death ==
In 1977, Shi met Tsui Hark while they both worked at Commercial Television; they began dating a year later. In 1984, they founded a film studio, where Shi was responsible for financing, distribution, and promotion. The couple co-produced over a hundred films. In 1993, rumors circulated about Tsui's affair with Sally Yeh, allegedly causing a temporary split with Shi. In 1996, Tsui and Shi married in Beverly Hills, California. In 2008, Tsui was reported to have been living with Seven Swords (2005) actress Chen Jiajia in Beijing. When asked about their status of marriage, Shi then responded, "Let me give you a standard answer. I've been saying this for years: what happens between two people is private and doesn't concern a third party." By 2011, Tsui began dating his assistant, Lele, whom he had met online during the filming of Flying Swords of Dragon Gate (2011). Shi announced their divorce in 2014, adding that Tsui and Lele had been together for some time.

On 9 July 2026, Shi was hospitalised in Hong Kong. She died on 13 July, aged 74, from multiple organ dysfunction at the Hong Kong Sanatorium & Hospital. (Note: Many sources mislabel her age as "75".) At the time of her death, she was also experiencing complications with her immune system.

== Honours and awards ==
Shi served as a jury member at the 57th Berlin International Film Festival in 2007 and the 64th Cannes Film Festival in 2011. She also received numerous international awards, including being named an Officer of the Order of Arts and Letters by the French Ministry of Culture in 2013, the Best Independent Producer Award at the Locarno Film Festival in 2014, the Lifetime Achievement Award at the Far East Film Festival in 2015, and the Marie Claire Asia Star Award Special Achievement Prize at the Busan International Film Festival in the same year. In 2017, she was awarded the Berlinale Camera Award at the 67th Berlin International Film Festival. In 2025, Shi received the Lifetime Achievement Award alongside Tsui Hark at the 43rd Hong Kong Film Awards.
