= It Takes Two (1982 film) =

1982 Hong Kong film by Karl Maka

- Film poster
- Traditional Chinese: 難兄難弟
- Simplified Chinese: 难兄难弟
- Hanyu Pinyin: Nàn Xiōng Nàn Dì
- Jyutping: Naan4 Hing1 Naan4 Dai6
- Directed by: Karl Maka
- Written by: Raymond Wong
- Produced by: Dean Shek; Raymond Wong
- Starring: Dean Shek; Richard Ng; Frances Yip; Cherie Chung
- Cinematography: Brian Lai
- Edited by: Tony Chow
- Music by: Teddy Robin
- Distributed by: Cinema City & Films Co.
- Release date: 15 July 1982
- Running time: 99 minutes
- Country: Hong Kong
- Language: Cantonese
- Box office: HK$16,724,578

It Takes Two (Chinese: 難兄難弟) is a 1982 Hong Kong comedy film directed by Karl Maka and starring Dean Shek and Richard Ng.

== Cast ==
- Dean Shek as Shek
- Richard Ng as Ai Don-Low
- Frances Yip as Miss Yip
- Cherie Chung as Chu
- Lau Sze-hong as Chun
- Wong Ching as Wong "Boss Wong" / "Jaws"
- Sek Yin-chi as Robin
- Cheng Mang-ha as Face Lift Beautician
- Fung King-man as Bing, The Loanshark
- George Lam as Olives Peddlar
- Tsui Hark as Taoist Priest
- Teddy Robin as Clothes Peddler
- Karl Maka as Albert
- Sylvia Chang as Restaurant Cleaner
- Eric Tsang as Shoeshine Boy
- Lau Kar-wing as The Butcher
- Alan Tam as Shampoo Boy
- Wong Wan-choi as Doctor
- Wong Ngai-yee as nurse
- Si Gai-keung as Fake Cop
- Kam San as Secretary Lo
- Tai San as Wong's Thug
- Shing Wan-in as Wong's Thug
- Yeung Yau-cheung as Wong's Chauffeur
- Shing Fui-On as Butcher's Customer
- Cho Tat-wah as Mr. Chao
- Ho Hen as Mr. Chimp
- Billy Lau as Bing's Thug
- Ng Kwok-kin as Fake Policeman
- Raymond Fung as Hung, The Manager

== See also ==
- List of Hong Kong films
