= Happy Ghost =

1984 Hong Kong film by Clifton Ko

- Original Hong Kong poster.
- Traditional Chinese: 開心鬼
- Simplified Chinese: 开心鬼
- Hanyu Pinyin: kāi xīn guǐ
- Jyutping: hoi1 sam1 gwai2
- Directed by: Clifton Ko
- Written by: Raymond Wong
- Screenplay by: Raymond Wong; Clifton Ko; Joe Ma; Mak Bing-cheung
- Produced by: Raymond Wong
- Starring: Raymond Wong; Bonnie Law; Loletta Lee; Sandy Lamb
- Cinematography: Bob Thompson
- Edited by: Tony Chow
- Music by: Mahmood Rum Jahn
- Production company: Cinema City Film Co. Ltd.
- Distributed by: Golden Princess Amusement Co. Ltd.
- Release date: 14 July 1984
- Running time: 96 minutes
- Country: Hong Kong
- Language: Cantonese
- Budget: HK$ 1,000,000
- Box office: HK$ 17,414,334

Happy Ghost (released in the Philippines as Magic to Win 3: The Origin) (Chinese: 開心鬼) is a 1984 Hong Kong comedy film directed by Clifton Ko. Produced and written by Raymond Wong, the film stars Wong, Boonie Law, Loletta Lee and Sandy Lamb. The film was the 12th most grossed film in Hong Kong of 1984.

== Plot ==
The film is about three high school students, Bonnie (Bonnie Law), Juliet (Rachel Lee) and Venus (Sandy Lamb), in their last year in school together, go on their last picnic before their examinations. Taking shelter from a sudden storm in an abandoned temple, Bonnie finds a piece of rope and takes it home. With this rope she brings home a spirit of Scholar Pik (Raymond Wong Pak-ming), whose archaic ways of thinking obviously clashed with the values held by a twentieth century teenager. Yet, they began to make friends with each other. The three girls started to depend on Scholar Pik's magic for everything. After their exam, they realize it, the girls begin to derive a more positive and hardworking attitude towards life through his encouragement.

== Cast ==
- Raymond Wong Pak-ming as Stewart Pik (朱錦春) - The Happy Ghost
- Bonnie Law as Bonnie Lam (林菁菁) - Naughty and playful, also an athlete
- Loletta Lee as Juliet (林小花) - Married to Joseph, has a son
- Sandy Lamb as Venus Koo (顏如玉) - Bookworm
- Teresa Carpio as Sister Lee (李主任) - Nun
- Hsiao-kang Wu as Joseph (陳世美) - Married to Juliet, has a son
- Luisa Maria Leitão as Judy - Daughter of a rich family, Juliet's rival in love
- Brenda Lo as Twiggy (八妹姐) - School dormitory worker, Fatty's wife
- Kai-Keung Sze as Fatty (肥叔叔) - School dormitory worker, Twiggy's husband, reads Playboy all the time
- Gou Wang as Mr. Koo (顏先生) - Koo's father
- Suen Lai as Mrs. Koo (顏太太) - Koo's mother
- Yu Chan-Kau as Brazano Trovaski Chan - Has a crush on Juliet
- Raymond Fung as Principle - Have a bad breath
- Elisa Chan as Pik's wife - Sold Put chai ko for a living
- Ching Tien as Pik's Father
- Clifton Ko as Bus passenger (cameo)

== Production ==
While in secondary school in Hong Kong, Joe Ma wrote a play that would later be adapted into the film Happy Ghost.

== Release ==
The film was released in Hong Kong on July 14, 1984. It grossed a total of HK$17,414,334.

In the Philippines, the film was released by South Cinema Films as Magic to Win 3: The Origin on 12 January 1989. It was released after Happy Ghost II (1985) and Happy Ghost III (1986) which were released as Magic to Win and Magic to Win 2 respectively.

== Reception and legacy ==
In his book Horror and Science Fiction Film IV, Donald C. Willis stated that Happy Ghost was "fairly elaborate and inventive, but tends to run off in all directions".

The film was the first in a series of Happy Ghost film which starred Raymond Wong Pak-ming between 1984 and 1991. Film critic Derek Elley wrote in 2011 that the five Happy Ghost films were "very much of their time and very Hong Kong in their humour." Elley continued that the films were mostly notable for starting the career of Clifton Ko as a hit comedy film director as he directed three of the films in the series. Elley said the Happy Ghost films were also known for introducing a series of young women, such as Loletta Lee and Fennie Yuen, who wore revealing outfits in each of the films.

== See also ==
- Clifton Ko filmography
- List of Hong Kong films of 1984

== Notes ==
Willis, Donald C. (1997). Horror and Science Fiction Films IV. Scarecrow Press. ISBN 0-8108-3055-8.
