= Happy Ghost V =

1991 Hong Kong film by Clifton Ko

- Original Hong Kong poster.
- Traditional Chinese: 開心鬼5上錯身
- Simplified Chinese: 开心鬼5上错身
- Hanyu Pinyin: Kai xin gui wu(5) shang cuo shen
- Jyutping: hoi1 sam1 gwai2 fong3 syu2 gaa2
- Directed by: Norman Chan; Raymond Wong
- Written by: Raymond Wong
- Produced by: Clifton Ko
- Starring: Raymond Wong; Kris Aquino; Roger Kwok; Tommy Wong
- Cinematography: Wong Po-man
- Edited by: Clifton Ko
- Music by: Danny Chung
- Production company: Mandarin Films Limited
- Release date: 8 August 1991 (Hong Kong)
- Running time: 91 minutes
- Country: Hong Kong
- Language: Cantonese
- Box office: HK$ $7,506,113.00

Happy Ghost V (Chinese: 開心鬼5上錯身) is a 1991 Hong Kong comedy film directed by Clifton Ko. The film stars Raymond Wong and Filipina actress Kris Aquino. It is the final film of the original series and is followed by the reboot Magic to Win.

== Plot ==
A story about a young woman's dog that makes a deal with the Happy Ghost (Raymond Wong) to become human for 49 days. When the period ends, the dog must leave and be reincarnated.

== Cast ==
- Raymond Wong as The Happy Ghost / Magic the Human Dog
- Kris Aquino as Kathy
- Roger Kwok as Jack Chiu
- Vincent Kok as George
- Gwan Joh Law as John
- Jeffrey Ho as Fatty Turtle
- Sun Wong as Mr. Chan
- Veronica Tsoi as Michelle

== Release ==
=== Box office ===
Happy Ghost V ran in theatres from 8 August 1991 to 4 September 1991 and grossed a total of HK $7,506,113.00.

== See also ==
- Clifton Ko filmography
- List of Hong Kong films of 1991
