= Prison on Fire II =

1991 Hong Kong film by Ringo Lam

- Film poster
- Directed by: Ringo Lam
- Written by: Nam Yin
- Produced by: Karl Maka
- Starring: Chow Yun-fat; Chen Sung-young; Yu Li; Tommy Wong; Victor Hon; Elvis Tsui; Wan Yeung-ming
- Cinematography: Andy Fan; Chan Hon-wing
- Edited by: Tony Chow
- Music by: Lowell Lo
- Production companies: Golden Princess Film Production; Cinema City & Films Co.
- Distributed by: Golden Princess Amusement
- Release date: 22 June 1991
- Running time: 109 minutes
- Country: Hong Kong
- Language: Cantonese
- Box office: HK$24,367,261

Prison on Fire II (Chinese: 監獄風雲II逃犯) is a 1991 Hong Kong action film directed by Ringo Lam, and starring Chow Yun-fat. The film is a sequel to 1987's Prison on Fire.

== Plot ==
Like the first film, this follows the fraternal bond of two inmates, once again Ching, but this time with, "Brother Dragon", a boss of the "Black Rats" a gang composing of Chinese Mainlanders. There is anomosity between the native Hong Konger and the Mainlander inmates, the latter claiming they are being bullied and discrimiated against by the natives. To which many of them decide to nominate Dragon as their leader since he was a former Captain in the Chinese Army and carries influence due to his leadership background.

Ching requests for leave to attend his mother's funeral, Officer Zau, Scarface's replacement, says he will only accept if Ching agrees to be his informant and report to him illegal activity that goes on inside his prison dorm. Zau holds a strong dislike for Ching as he heard that Ching was the reason for his predecessor being heavily injured and targets him repeatedly. Ching refuses and Officer Zau dismisses his request. Leung, Ching's young son and a social worker Miss Wong visits Ching in prison, where he was given a letter to sign to agree to place Leung in an orphanage after his only relative and caretaker, his grandmother died.

Leung harbours resentment due to Ching's absence in his life. Miss Wong later notifys Ching that his son is sick and in hospital, to which Ching asks Officer Zau permission to go on leave. Officer Zau tells him to humiliatingly shine his shoes during yard time in front of all the other prisoners, to which he complies, desperate to see his son. Despite that, Officer Zau than refused to grant leave. Later Miss Wong visits, and informs Ching that his son has escaped the orphanage and the police are looking for him, where Ching in anger lashes out at her for not looking after him properly.

Ching later gets good news that his son has been found and has returned to the orphanage. Miss Wong asks him if he could come to the orphanage at a reception day, to hopefully rekindle their relationship. Ching shortly after decides to escape the prison in order to see his son, knowing Zau will never grant leave, by disguising himself in a guard's uniform and hiding under the truck that is also ironically driving off to look for him, and after seeing an opportunity jumps out.

Ching sees his son at the orphanage and the two managed to rekindle their relationship, afterwards he surrendered peacefully. Officer Zau beats him upon his return and breaks one of his legs, afterwards making him stand with bandages all wrapped around him with a sign on his neck, implying that all escapees will end up like him. Officer Zau intending to inflict further punishment upon Ching, gives Skull, Dragon's right-hand man a free pass to kill Ching by ambushing him in the toilets.

Ching when using the toilet is ambushed and beaten by Skull and dozens of the Mainlander gang. Snake, the leader of one of the Hong Konger prison gangs and Ching's friend, who was present in the toilet comes to his aid, but was too outnumbered and stabbed to death by Skull. Snake's men who heard their boss was being attacked was blocked from entering the toilet. Dragon checks on Snake's condition and pulls out the weapon that was inflicted on him, guards came in at the same moment and detained Dragon, who was mistakingly assumed as the culprit and put in isolation as they investigate, Ching was too, put in isolation in the cell next to him.

Officer Zau summons Skull the next day and tells him Snake had died from his injuries. He tells Skull to sign a letter agreeing to testify against his Boss Dragon as the 'murdurer', to which he agrees to save his own skin, the pair also both decide to frame it on Ching as the one who testified. Dragon and Ching spend time doing labour together and become friends, where Dragon asks how he escaped the last time, to which Ching sarcastically says he did it by jumping off the cliff and swam to shore. Dragon gets summoned the next day and the Superintendent tells him that he will be transported to another prison and have an additional sentence for the murder of Snake.

Dragon angered for being framed and in a panic, attacks the Superintendent, jumps out the window and decides to escape prison via cliff and hides in the wilderness. After a few days Ching is later released from isolation, and during meal time noticed the inmates and his fellow friends were avoiding him. When suddenly, Snake and the Mainlanders attacks him. Bill, his friend, leader of another Hong Kong gang and his men, come to Ching's aid. The fight is broken up by the Guards but no one was punished under Officer Zau's order to just continue eating making many bewildered. Bill tells Ching that Skull has told all the Mainlanders that Ching was the one who testified against their Boss, Dragon, framing and setting him up.

Later, Ching is sent by Officer Zau to the Mainlander's dorm cell instead with his fellow Hong Kongers. Zau intends to have Ching killed and turn a blind eye by placing him with the Mainlanders. Ching refuses to go into the cell since it's a death sentence, and fights back against the Guards, and escapes a second time, via cliff after seeing that Dragon had actually succeeded. Ching was on the run. The Hong Konger inmates make bets with ciggerates on how long Ching will last before being captured.

On the second day, Ching whilst being chased by guards and police dogs, run into a Chicken Hen that Dragon was in and the two escape together. The two spend time in hiding where they grew close, and Dragon suggests the both of them go to the Mainland to hide. Ching agrees, and went to the orphanage for his son and intended to bring him along, but was refused by the social worker, where she was shoved away. Leung wants to go with his father and runs off with him. The police in plainclothes surround the orphanage, and Ching was apprehended by the police and was brought back to prison.

On the way back, Officer Zau tortures Ching. Ching gets thrown into the prison cell with the Mainland group and is beaten up by them, to near death, as they thought he was the one who betrayed Brother Dragon by testifying. Skull takes a toothbrush, with a sharpened back and stabs Ching. Ching tries to tell them that he was with Dragon on the outside, but they continue attacking him. Fireball stops them from finishing Ching off, wanting to hear him out, Ching then convinces Brother Fireball, that Dragon was waiting for them outside with a boat, and told the other cellmates to set a fire in the prison cell, so as to escape from prison during the chaos.

After the fire breaks out, all the prisoners assembles outside, but Ching yells for help and runs towards to the Hongkie group for help. A fight then occurs between the Hongkie group and the Mainlanders, resulting in the arrival of more jail warden personnel, who use water jet sprayers to control the situation, while Skull goes into hiding inside the canteen. Ching follows Skull and a violent fight starts, Ching angered at Skull for setting him up. Officer Zau and his officers witness the fight and instead of breaking it up, Zau gives the order to lock them up, watching them fighting behind the gate. Skull begs Officer Zau to open the gate but Zau refuses.

Skull self reproaches on his mistakes to Ching, and when Ching turns his back, Skull tries to stab Ching with the toothbrush again. Ching eventually knocks Skull down by dragging him over the table. Officer Zau then opens up the gate, and tries to use his baton to hit Ching, but was stopped by a good officer. Unfortunately, the good officer gets knocked down with the Baton by Zau's barbaric act. Ching picks up the toothbrush and hides it while Officer Zau approaches him. Zau hits Ching's left arm and Ching uses the toothbrush, and stabs it into Officer Zau's left eye. Officer Zau screams in pain and engages in delirium. Officer Zau collapses on the floor and Ching faints. Ching awakes in a hospital and takes up his son's report card and reads it.

His cellmate commented that his son's "handwriting was not bad", also a message for his dad: "Dad, don't be naughty in prison, Don't let me worry about you, remember..." this sentence is meaningful, "Tolerate, Tolerate, Tolerate...." Ching was discharged from the hospital and was being brought back to his cell, an officer told him that he was lucky that he had an officer to stand witness for him about the fight, that officer also gained a higher position thanks to him, signaling an end to the chaos. Dragon was also subsequently captured after.

A new superintendent visits the cell and it is a coincidence that they met together back at the orphanage when he escaped the prison for the first time. Ching requests the superintendent, when he visits the orphanage, to visit his son. Whilst doing labour, Ching sees Dragon on the bus being transported to another prison and the two farewell one another, with Dragon also telling him he has cleared up the mess with his men and to not worry anymore. Before the ending credits roll, an officer says "Long time no see" to Ching, and its officer "Scarface" from the previous film, Ching then self mutters ... about how unlucky he is and not again, and another cycle of torture. However the tone of the scene is built to be humorous implying Scarface no longer wields any similar threat, especially since the prisoners from the mainland were instructed not to hurt Ching, while he maintains an elder appreciation and respect from his Hongkonger cellmates.

== Cast ==
- Chow Yun-fat as Chung Tin-ching
- Chen Sung-young as Dragon
- Yu Li as Miss Wong
- Tommy Wong as Bill
- Victor Hon as Chiu-chow Man
- Elvis Tsui as Officer Zau
- Wan Yeung-ming as Fai Chi
- Frankie Ng as Blind Snake
- Roy Cheung as Officer "Scarface" Hung (cameo)

== Awards ==
Year	Award	Category	Name	Result
1992	11th Hong Kong Film Awards	Hong Kong Film Award for Best Action Choreography	Lee Moon-Wah	Nominated

== See also ==
- Chow Yun-fat filmography
- List of Hong Kong films
