= Kowloon Development Company =

Kowloon Development Company Limited
- Company type: Public
- Industry: Property Development, Property Investment
- Founded: January 24, 1961; 65 years ago
- Founder: Or Wai Shuen
- Headquarters: Hong Kong, China
- Area served: Hong Kong, Mainland China, Macau
- Key people: Or Wai Shuen - Chairman and Executive Director; LaI Ka Fai - Executive Director; Or Kui Kwan - Executive Director; Lam Yung Hei - Executive Director
- Products: 63 Pok Fu Lam; Times Square
- Number of employees: 864
- Website: http://www.kdc.com.hk/en/home/index.php

Kowloon Development Company Limited (Chinese: 九龍建業有限公司) (SEHK: 0034) is a property development company based and listed in Hong Kong. It focuses on the property development and investment sector. Kowloon Development is also a stakeholder of Polytec Asset Holdings Limited (SEHK: 0208).

== History ==
In January 1961, the main stakeholder of Kowloon Motor Bus, Ng Siu Chan (Chinese: 伍兆燦), as well as William Louey (Chinese: 雷瑞德) and other businessmen, founded Kowloon Development Company. The company started as a local developer mainly focusing on property development in Hong Kong.

In 1982, the company founded a subsidiary, Golden Princess Amusement Co Ltd., in order to target a market segment in the local filming industry and open up its market and sales to public entertainment.

In 1995, the company was listed on the main board of the Hong Kong Stock Exchange, with the stock code 0034.

In 2002, the company was acquired by Polytec Macau, a company also owned by Or Wai Sheun. Later in 2005, the company acquired Polytec Asset, which was in heavy debt at that time. From 2010, the company started buying numerous lands through different methods, such as auctions and redevelopment enforced auctions of older buildings.
