= By Hook or by Crook (1980 film) =

1980 Hong Kong film by Karl Maka

- Film poster
- Traditional Chinese: 鹹魚番生
- Simplified Chinese: 咸鱼番生
- Hanyu Pinyin: Xián Yú Fān Shēng
- Jyutping: Haam4 Jyu4 Faan1 Saang1
- Directed by: Karl Maka
- Written by: Raymond Wong
- Produced by: Karl Maka
- Starring: Sammo Hung; Dean Shek; Eric Tsang; Wu Ma; Karl Maka; Alice Lau
- Cinematography: Manny Hoh
- Edited by: Tony Chow
- Music by: Frankie Chan
- Distributed by: Bo Ho Film Company Ltd
- Release date: 7 August 1980
- Running time: 87 minutes
- Country: Hong Kong
- Language: Cantonese
- Box office: HK$3,285,724

By Hook or by Crook (Chinese: 鹹魚番生) is a 1980 Hong Kong kung fu comedy film produced and directed by Karl Maka and starring Sammo Hung and Dean Shek.

== Plot ==
The film starts out with a thief stealing jewelry from the millionaire Chin Pai-wen (Tang Ching). The family believes it was done by the infamous Flower Kid, who steals from the rich and gives it to the poor. They then hire Sheriff Butcher Wing (Karl Maka) to find him. However, Chin's wife (Yau Poon-ling) suggests Skinny Gee (Dean Shek), a con man who catches crooks, instead. So Butcher Wing tries to get Skinny Gee by framing him for harassing his sister . He then offers him a deal, if he finds the Flower Kid. Gee manages to find Flower Kid. Gee then tells Wing a plan to arrest Flower Kid by setting him up. They fail and Wing arrests Gee for fooling him. Flower Kid then arrives, disguised as a woman, to rescue Gee out of jail. It was a set up by Flower Kid and Gee. Later it is revealed that he is not the real Flower Kid. He is a man named Fatso (Sammo Hung), who idolizes Flower Kid and pretends to be him.

Fatso and Gee later finds the real Flower Kid (Wu Ma), who is now old and retired. Then it was also revealed who the thief was at the beginning of the film, a lover of Lady Chin. Later, Lady Chin hires an assassin, Chung Fat-pak (Chung Fat), to kill Flower Kid. The assassin also kills Lady Chin's lover.

Fatso and Gee tries to get a bodyguard for Flower Kid. The bodyguard is a knife throwing expert. He engages in a Mexican standoff against Never Miss (Eric Tsang) a gun expert. Never Miss kills the bodyguard. Then, Fatso and Gee start training Flower Kid to get his confidence and energy back. During this time, Chung kills Chin Pai-wen. Later, Fatso and Gee also hired a family to act as victim of Chung to get Flower Kid's confidence to battle Chung.

The trio then proceeds to find Chung where they engage in a big fight at Chin's funeral. First, Fatso and Gee battles Chung's two henchmen and Flower Kid fights Chung. Then, Fatso and Gee kill the henchmen and then Fatso fights Chung eventually killing him in the end. Afterwards, Flower Kid leaves town. In the end, Gee is arrested again, Fatso is arrested too, but he was rewarded out to be sheriff and instead, Wing takes his spot in jail.

== Cast ==
- Sammo Hung as Fatso
- Dean Shek as Skinny Gee
- Eric Tsang as Never Miss
- Wu Ma as Flower Kid
- Karl Maka as Sheriff Butcher Wing
- Alice Lau as Butcher Wing's sister
- Chung Fat as Chung Fat-pak the Golden Killer
- Tang Ching as Millionaire Chin Pai-wen
- Tai San as Flower Kid impersonator
- Chow Kam-kong as Ta-[ao
- Ho Pak-kwong as Skinny Gee's father in law
- Lam Ching-ying as Gang leader
- Ban Yun-sang as thug
- Siu Tak-foo as Golden Killer's man
- Yau Pooi-ling as Lady Chin
- Hon Kwok-choi as Gang leader
- Johnny Cheung as Gangster
- Pang Yun-cheung
- Sai Gwa-Pau
- Shing Wan-on
- Ha Kwok-wing
- Gigi Wong
- Ng Min-kan

== See also ==
- Sammo Hung filmography
