= Happy Ghost III =

1986 Hong Kong film by Johnnie To

- Hong Kong film poster for Happy Ghost III

Chinese name
- Traditional Chinese: 開心鬼撞鬼
- Simplified Chinese: 开心鬼撞鬼
Transcriptions
Standard Mandarin
- Hanyu Pinyin: kāi, xīn, guǐ, zhuàng-chuáng, guǐ
Yue: Cantonese
- Jyutping: hoi1, sam1, gwai2, cong4-zong6, gwai2
- Directed by: Johnnie To
- Written by: Raymond Wong
- Produced by: Raymond Wong
- Starring: Raymond Wong; Maggie Cheung; Fennie Yuen; Charine Chan
- Cinematography: Bob Thompson
- Edited by: David Wu
- Music by: Joseph Koo
- Production company: Cinema City
- Distributed by: Golden Princess
- Release date: July 3, 1986
- Running time: 96 minutes
- Country: Hong Kong
- Language: Cantonese
- Box office: HK$ 15,339,277

Happy Ghost III (Chinese: 開心鬼撞鬼; pinyin: Kai xin gui zhuang gui) is a 1986 Hong Kong comedy film directed by Johnnie To. Produced and written by Raymond Wong, the film stars Wong and Maggie Cheung. This is the third installment in the "Happy Ghost" series, the film is far more frenetically paced than the first two and its much more a film for adults.

== Plot ==
The film is about a spirit of the late female singer Tsui Pan Han (Maggie Cheung) waits in the afterlife for a chance to be reincarnated. She meets the Godfather (Tsui Hark) who has found an appropriate musical family for her to be reincarnated with. Her opportunity to be born into the new family is ruined when Sam Kwai (Raymond Wong) takes the pregnant wife to the wrong hospital. Pan Han is given one month to find a new body to assume her reincarnation in, and decides in the meantime to harass Sam Kwai. Kwai eventually summons the Happy Ghost to help him out.

== Cast ==
- Raymond Wong Pak-ming as Steward Pik (朱錦春) - The happy ghost, lost his powers after Pan-Han cut his braid
- Raymond Wong Pak-ming as Hong Sam-Kwai (康森貴) - In love with Pan-Han, sent to an insane asylum
- Maggie Cheung as Tsui Pan-Han (徐半香) - Has the power to stop time, in love with Sam-Kwai, reincarnated in the end
- Fennie Yuen as Thai Cheuk-Yee (戴卓儀) - High school student and prefect, possessed by Pan-Han many times
- Charine Chan as Yiu-King (姚婛) - High school student, has a crush on Alan
- Danny Poon as Alan Cheung Chee-Kit (張子傑) - Transferred high school student, has a crush on Cheuk-Yee, involved with gangsters
- Joh Yin-Ling as Mona (夢娜) - Sam-Kwai's ex-girlfriend
- Charlie Cho as Rock Hudson (洛克遜) - Mona's cousin
- Joseph Koo as Ka-Yan Koo (顧家仁) - Musician, Sandy's husband
- Leung San as Sandy (桑迪) - Ka-Yan's wife, Pan-Han's future mother
- Man-No Chan as Headmistress - Has a crush on Sam-Kwai, fired Sam-Kwai in the end
- Ching Wong as Boss - Alan's gangster boss
- Bing-Chuen Cheung as Boss's thug
- David Wu as Boss's thug
- Tsui Hark as Reincarnation Director
- Cheng Siu-Ping as Nurse
- Anna Ng Yuen-Yee as Nurse
- Sze Kai-Keung as Motorcycle Policeman
- Yue Chi Ming as Doctor
- Tony Chow Kwok-Chung as Radio DJ (Voice)

== Production ==
Happy Ghost III was the first film director Johnnie To had worked for Cinema City and his first film since The Enigmatic Case (1980). To had previously been working in television after the box office failure of The Enigmatic Case. To found the film easy to approach as he did not have to write the script and was told he was not allowed to change it by Cinema City's rules. Tsui Hark appears in the film as the Godfather and also provides the film with the special effects.

== Release ==
=== Box office ===
Happy Ghost III was a hit for Cinema City and grossed a total of HK$15,339,277 and was the 11th-highest-grossing film of the year in Hong Kong. The film grossed less than its two prequels Happy Ghost and Happy Ghost II, which earned a total of HK$17.4 and HK$16.6 respectively. The film was followed by Happy Ghost 4, which was directed by Clifton Ko.

== See also ==
- Johnnie To filmography
- List of Hong Kong films of 1986

== Notes ==
=== References ===
- O'Brien, Daniel (2003). Spooky Encounters: A Gwailo's Guide to Hong Kong Horror. Headpress. ISBN 1900486318.
- Morton, Lisa (2009). The Cinema of Tsui Hark. McFarland. ISBN 978-0-7864-4460-1.
- Teo, Stephen (2007). Director in Action: Johnnie To and the Hong Kong Action Films. Hong Kong University Press. ISBN 978-9622098404.
