= All the Wrong Clues for the Right Solution =

1981 Hong Kong film by Tsui Hark

- Hong Kong film poster

Chinese name
- Traditional Chinese: 鬼馬智多星
- Simplified Chinese: 鬼马智多星
Transcriptions
Standard Mandarin
- Hanyu Pinyin: Guǐ mǎ zhìduōxīng
Yue: Cantonese
- Jyutping: Gwai^{2} maa^{5} zi^{3}do^{1}sing^{1}
- Directed by: Tsui Hark
- Written by: Raymond Wong; Szeto Cheuk-hon
- Story by: Karl Maka; Tsui Hark; Raymond Wong; Eric Tsang Chi-wai; Szeto Chuk-hon
- Produced by: Karl Maka; Dean Shek
- Starring: George Lam; Teddy Robin; Karl Maka
- Cinematography: Bill Wong
- Edited by: Chao Kwok-chung
- Music by: Teddy Robin
- Production company: Cinema City & Films Co.
- Distributed by: Golden Princess Amusement Co. Ltd.
- Release date: 23 July 1981 (HK)
- Running time: 99 minutes
- Country: Hong Kong
- Language: Cantonese

All the Wrong Clues for the Right Solution (Chinese: 鬼馬智多星) is a 1981 Hong Kong neo-noir crime comedy film directed and co-written by Tsui Hark, and starring George Lam, Teddy Robin (who also scored the film), and Karl Maka (who also co-wrote the story). A satire of detective fiction, the film follows a down-on-his-luck private investigator and a police detective, who team up to take down a gangster who is planning to cheat elderly millionaires out of their stocks.

The film was Tsui's first commercial success and was the fourth highest grossing Hong Kong film of 1981. It was nominated for five Golden Horse Awards and won three, including for Best Director.

== Plot ==
Chief Inspector Robin receives information about the release of a felon who is rumored to be interested in murdering someone. At first, he is unable to determine the identity of both the felon and the supposed victim. However, after some research, he concludes the felon is triad boss Ah Capone and the victim is private investigator Yoho. In order to protect Yoho, Inspector Robin arrests him on a trivial charge and locks him up at the police station.

After Capone is released from prison he meets up with the four heads of the four families to re-establish his position as head honcho and express his goal of murdering Yoho. He issues a death warrant for Yoho and sends henchman, Popeye to act upon it.

Yoho and Inspector Robin turn out to be childhood friends. Inspector Robin repeats his reason for keeping Yoho locked up, however Yoho appears to be unconcerned and insists on leaving. To prevent him leaving, Inspector Robin imposes a $5000 bail. However to his surprise, a mysterious woman arrives to promptly pay the $5000 bail money upfront. Although Yoho doesn't know the woman, he leaves with her. On the way out, they bump into Popeye who deliberately got arrested in order to kill Yoho in prison.

Yoho follows the mysterious woman to her house where he learns she is married to a rich, disabled old man, Yummy. The old man informs Yoho that his wife is in fact trying to kill him in order to obtain his assets. Yoho promises the old man that he'll obtain evidence of his wife's treachery.

After Yoho follows the old man's wife, they are both captured by Capone who locks them up and leaves them to die. They eventually escape and return to Yummy's house and notice some henchmen posted outside. Yoho learns that Capone tricked Yummy into believing that Yoho and his wife were having an affair to pave the way for Mimi to seduce Yummy. Filled with rage, Yummy chased and shot at the pair. They were finally able to escape and leave the house separately. On his way, Yoho meets a young woman, Wai who helps him escape the henchmen.

Meanwhile, Mimi successfully seduces Yummy who learns of her true intent and drops down in a faint. On his way to unconsciousness, he reveals the existence of a daughter and that he'll leave everything to her.

Wai tells Yoho of her relationship with Yummy. During their conversation, Yoho receives a phone call from Inspector Robin who tells him that Yummy is in the hospital. Yoho follows Wai to the hospital and finds that Capone's henchmen are also looking for Yummy. Yoho decides to try and spirit Yummy out of the hospital. Unfortunately, he is ambushed and Wai is kidnapped by an unknown party.

Capone receives a phone call from a woman claiming she has Wai and that he must come up with the ransom to rescue Wai if he wants Yummy's assets. After they disconnect, the woman is revealed to be Yummy's wife. It is then revealed further that it is a huge scam as Yummy, Yummy's wife and also his daughter are a family of professional swindlers. As well, Yoho was already privy to all of this but didn't uncover their identities because he wanted to find out about Yummy's swindling scheme. Yoho partners up with Yummy for a second scheme, to swindle the four heads of the four families. With Yummy's agreement, Yoho then sets up the four heads of the four families.

Both Capone and the four heads of the four families arrive at the appointed place at the same time. After a shoot-out, Inspector Robin appears with a troop of policemen and arrests everyone. The ransom is collected but as both bags are deposited into a police cruiser, it is driven away by Yoho. Inspector Robin and Capone give chase but only Inspector Robin makes it to the pier where Yummy and his family are waiting for Yoho. Yoho hands over the ransom to Yummy. In an apparent betrayal, Yoho and Inspector Robin shoot each other while Yummy takes the opportunity to escape with his family and ransom. After the boat takes off, Yoho and Inspector Robin get up unharmed and Yummy finds the ransom is actually worthless paper. Yoho and Inspector Robin then take off with the real money to Paris.

== Cast ==
- George Lam as Yoho
- Teddy Robin as Chief Inspection Robin
- Karl Maka as Ah Capone
- Tang Kee-chan as Yummy
- Marylinn Wong Cho-shut as Wai, Yummy's daughter
- Yiu Wai as Yummy's wife
- David Wu as Capone's dumb thug
- John Shum as Piano player
- Bolo Yeung as Bar brawler
- Eric Tsang as "Popeye"

== Style ==
Unlike Tsui Hark's previous films, All the Wrong Clues for the Right Solution is a commercial comedy without any social commentary or avant-garde elements of his previous three films. The film is a parody of Hollywood gangster and detective films. Tsui's initial idea was to make what he described as a "silly movie. All the movies I've done before were very serious and very depressing"

== Release ==
All the Wrong Clues for the Right Solution was released on 23 July 1981. The film was Tsui Hark's first major box office success grossing $7,479,976 in making it the fourth highest grossing film in Hong Kong.

== Reception ==
Tsui Hark won the award for Best Director at the Taiwan Golden Horse Film Festival and Awards for his work on All the Wrong Clues for the Right Solution which was Tsui's first major film award. The film also won the Golden Horse Award for Best Cinematography and Film Editing. It was also nominated for Best Art Direction and Best Feature.

== Sequel ==
The film was followed by a sequel in 1983 titled All the Wrong Spies, directed by Robin.

== See also ==
- List of comedy films of the 1980s
- List of Hong Kong films of 1981

== Bibliography ==
- Morton, Lisa (2009). The Cinema of Tsui Hark. McFarland. ISBN 9780786444601.
