= The Eighth Happiness =

1988 Hong Kong film by Johnnie To

- Film poster

Chinese name
- Traditional Chinese: 八星報喜
- Simplified Chinese: 八星报喜
Transcriptions
Standard Mandarin
- Hanyu Pinyin: Bā Xīng Bào Xǐ
Yue: Cantonese
- Jyutping: Baat3 Sing1 Bou3 Hei2
- Directed by: Johnnie To
- Written by: Philip Cheng; Raymond Wong
- Produced by: Raymond Wong
- Starring: Chow Yun-fat; Raymond Wong; Jacky Cheung; Carol Cheng; Cherie Chung; Fung Bo Bo; Fennie Yuen
- Cinematography: Joe Chan; Paul Chan
- Edited by: David Wu
- Music by: Tony Lo
- Production company: Cinema City & Films Co.
- Distributed by: Cinema City & Films Co.
- Release date: 11 February 1988
- Running time: 91 minutes
- Country: Hong Kong
- Language: Cantonese
- Box office: HK$37,090,776

The Eighth Happiness (八星報喜) is a 1988 Hong Kong comedy film directed by Johnnie To and starring an ensemble cast of Chow Yun-fat, Raymond Wong, Jacky Cheung, Carol Cheng, Cherie Chung, Fung Bo Bo and Fennie Yuen. It was the highest-grossing film in Hong Kong at the time. The film centers around three brothers Fong Kim-long (Chow Yun-fat), Fong Kim-fai (Raymond Wong Pak-ming) and Fong Kim-sang (Jacky Cheung). One day, their telephone line failed, they meet their future wife because of this incident.

== Cast ==
- Chow Yun-fat as 'Handsome' Fong Kim-long
- Raymond Wong as Fong Kim-Fai
- Jacky Cheung as Fong Kim-sang
- Carol Cheng as DoDo
- Fennie Yuen as Ying-ying
- Cherie Chung as Beautiful
- Michael Chow as Ying-ying's boyfriend
- Lawrence Cheng as Beautiful's boyfriend
- Charlie Cho as DoDo's prospective suitor
- Fung Bo Bo as Ng Fan-fong
- Teddy Robin as Fan-fong's husband
- Wong Kwan-yuen as Ming-ming
- Cheng Mang-ha as Old woman driver
- Ying Sau Hui as Old man driver
- Ringo Lam as Audience member (cameo)
- Karl Maka as Audience member (cameo)
- John Shum as Audience member (cameo)

== Box office ==
The film grossed HK$37,090,776 at the Hong Kong box office during its theatrical run from 11 February to 30 March 1988 and was the top-grossing film of 1988 in Hong Kong and the highest-grossing film in Hong Kong at the time.
