= Esprit d'amour =

1983 Hong Kong film by Ringo Lam

- Original Hong Kong film poster

Chinese name
- Traditional Chinese: 陰陽錯
- Simplified Chinese: 阴阳错
Transcriptions
Standard Mandarin
- Hanyu Pinyin: yīnyángcuò
Yue: Cantonese
- Jyutping: jam1 joeng4 co3
- Directed by: Ringo Lam
- Written by: Raymond Fung; Clifton Ko; Kin Lo
- Screenplay by: Ko Chi-Sum; Lo Kin; Raymond Fung
- Story by: Raymond Wong
- Based on: Esprit d'amour (1970 film)
- Produced by: Raymond Wong; Dean Shek; Karl Maka
- Starring: Alan Tam; Cecilia Yip; Ni Shu Chun; Philip Chan; Bill Tung; Billy Lau
- Cinematography: Bob Thompson; Arthur Wong; Bill Wong
- Edited by: Tony Chow
- Music by: Tang Siu Lam
- Production company: Cinema City Film Co. Ltd.
- Distributed by: Golden Princess Amusement Co. Ltd.
- Release date: 15 December 1983
- Running time: 93 minutes
- Country: Hong Kong
- Language: Cantonese
- Box office: HK$14,102,667

Esprit d'amour is a 1983 Hong Kong supernatural romance film directed by Ringo Lam and starring Alan Tam, Shu-Chun Ni and Cecilia Yip. Shot in modern-day Hong Kong, the film centres on protagonist Koo Chi-Ming, a hapless insurance investigator who while investigating the death of a young woman begins being haunted by her spirit.

Based on an original story by Raymond Wong, Esprit d'amour is credited as the very first film directed by Hong Kong director Ringo Lam, better known for his later 1987 film City on Fire starring Chow Yun-fat. Released in Hong Kong on 15 December 1983, the film took in a total of HK$14.1 million at the box office and gained one nomination at the 1985 Hong Kong Film Awards.

In 1998 Esprit d'amour was released on VHS in the United States and on DVD in 2005. A digitally remastered Hong Kong version was also released a few years later in mid-2008.

== Plot summary ==
Koo Chi-Ming (Alan Tam) is a life-insurance investigator who, on his way to his engagement party, loses control of his car and almost runs over a young woman, Siu-Yu (Ni Shu-Chun). Later upon arriving at his party he and his father (Bill Tung) begin being henpecked by his mother (Tang Pik-wan) and his fiancée Ivy (Cecilia Yip). At the end of the party, attendees play with a Ouija board attempting to talk to a spirit. Chi-Ming's little brother explains that after they are finished they must send the spirit back, otherwise the person last holding the saucer will be haunted by the spirit. Elsewhere, Siu-Yu is on the roof of her apartment with her goddaughter Mimi waiting for clothes to dry, when Siu-Yu notices that Mimi is very close to the edge. Rushing forward to grab Mimi, Siu-Yu accidentally steps on a skateboard, which sends her over the edge of the roof. As soon as Siu-Yu dies, the Ouija board saucer begins to move and points out her name. The saucer then begins to rotate violently on the board, throwing everyone back, apart from Chi-Ming, who holds on until the saucer flips over to reveal a small spot of blood, indicating he will be haunted.

The next day at work, Chi-Ming is handed two cases to investigate by his boss (Philip Chan). The spirit of Siu-Yu makes sure that he gets her case by switching the files. While looking through the case file, Chi-Ming notices that the name of the deceased is the same as the one spelt out on the Ouija board. After visiting her apartment, he realises that he almost ran over her the night before. Upon returning home, the ghost of Siu-Yu appears to Chi-Ming and tells him that her death was an accident. She asks that the insurance money be paid to Mimi.

At work Chi-Ming is about to write up his report, but his boss tells him to rule the death a suicide. Later, Chi-Ming tells her that he cannot override his boss's decision. Siu-Yu begins to play pranks on Chi-Ming's boss, causing him to fire Chi-Ming. Chi-Ming takes the loss hard, ending up in jail only to be bailed out and re-hired by his former boss, still haunted by Siu-Yu.

Now a free man and with a promotion, Chi-Ming begins a romantic relationship with Siu-Yu, much to the dismay of his girlfriend, who along with his mother hires an exorcist, Dr. Han (Tien Feng). At Chi-Ming's apartment, Dr. Han explains that while he is performing the exorcism the front door, which he calls "the door of life", cannot be opened as this would cause the "door of death" to open. He also instructs Ivy to keep Chi-Ming from his apartment during the exorcism.

Ivy takes Chi-Ming out to a nightclub to distract him, but while watching a dance performance he spots Siu-Yu on stage and in great distress. At the same time, in Chi-Ming's apartment, Dr. Han summons Siu-Yu, who disappears in front of Chi-Ming. Chi-Ming rushes home to find Dr. Han in the middle of the exorcism. Rushing to help Siu-Yu, he opens the "door of death". Dr. Han runs away, while the contents of the room are sucked out of the window, along with Chi-Ming and Siu-Yu. Grabbing the balcony railing Chi-Ming fails to hang onto Siu-Yu. Trying to follow her he jumps, but falls down 18 floors onto a parked car. After recovering in the hospital, Chi-Ming returns to where he first saw Siu-Yu, hoping to find her. He walks out onto the road and is almost hit by a car. The female driver resembles but is not Siu-Yu. She drives away. He removes his glasses and looks up at the sky with a smile.

== Cast ==
- Alan Tam as Koo Chi-Ming (古志明) – an insurance investigator who falls in love with a female ghost
- Joyce Ni Shu Chun (倪淑君) as Chang Siu-Yu (張小瑜) – a girl who died in an accidental fall, became a ghost and begins to haunt Chi-Ming
- Cecilia Yip as Ivy – Chi-Ming's controlling girlfriend
- Tang Pik-wan as Chi-Ming's Mother
- Bill Tung as Chi-Ming's Father
- Cheng Mang-Ha as Mimi's Grandmother
- Tien Feng as Dr. Han – a Taoist priest who tries to exorcise the ghost Siu-Yu
- Lung Tin-Sang as Dr Han's assistant
- Billy Lau as Chi-Ming's colleague
- Philip Chan as John Tang – Chi-Ming's boss

== Production ==
The film is based on an American film from 1970 and on an original story by Raymond Wong. Wong's inspiration for the film came on a trip to worship his ancestors, while his family was making preparations. Wong was wandering around nearby and came upon a grave. There was a picture of a girl on the tombstone. She was quite pretty so he stopped to look at the picture when suddenly he felt a chill go down his spine. He was afraid because as he stared at her, he thought, "she might haunt me this night". Wong then walked away and rejoined his family. That night, he tossed and turned in bed thinking about what had happened and came up with the story. Wong and his childhood friends used to play séance, so he decided to include this in the storyline, too. It was decided that the movie should have a French-language title rather than an English international title, meaning "Spirit of love".

Alan Tam was quickly chosen for the starring role but the lead actress was undecided. Maggie Cheung was originally meant to play the role of Siu-Yu, but was rejected by director Po-Chih Leong.

At the Golden Horse Awards in a cocktail reception the director spotted a young girl called Joyce Ni and instantly wanted her to play Siu Yu, however she had never acted before. In an interview, co-producer Raymond Wong said that he respected the director's choice and casting her was the right decision.

Filming began in late 1982 under the direction of Po-Chih Leong, director of the generally well-received Hong Kong 1941. According to Ringo Lam around one-third of the film had been shot when Leong resigned after arguing with producer Karl Maka. In need of a quick and inexpensive replacement Maka gave the previously unknown Ringo Lam his big break. Later in an interview Lam explained, "I have no choice, I need food, so I do the best I can ..." Lam received sole directing credit for the film.

The film's theme song (Chinese: 幻影; Jyutping: waan6 jing2), known in English as "Illusion", or sometimes as "Phantom" or "Mirage", is used throughout the movie in a music box and is also used in the ending credits. It was composed by Chinese composer and music producer Lam Manyee, written by Lam Man-Chung and sung in Cantonese by lead actor Alan Tam. A version in Mandarin, also sung by Alan Tam, was later released under the same Chinese name.

== Reception ==
=== Critical response ===
The film received mainly positive to average reviews with one critic at LoveHKFilm.com stating "This isn't a spectacular film, but classifying it as above-average HK Cinema is more than appropriate." Hong Kong Digital described it as "run-of-the-mill" but with "modicum charm," while another review at So Good... calls it a "true Hong Kong product" with a "stylish tension-filled ending". On the Chinese movie review website, Douban, it received an average rating of 7.2 out of 10 based on 275 user reviews, and also made the list for the 10 Best Chinese Ghost Movies on Screen Junkies by coming in at number 2.

=== Nominations ===
The film was nominated at the 4th Hong Kong Film Awards, in the "Best Original Film Song" category. The song that attracted the nomination was "Illusion", which had music by Lam Manyee, lyrics by Lam Man-Chung, and was sung by lead actor and Cantopop singer Alan Tam. The award ultimately went to "A Chance Encounter" (偶遇), the theme song of the 1984 film A Certain Romance (少女日記), sung by Samantha Lam.

=== Box office ===
Producer Raymond Wong remarked in an interview that it was "a box office hit". The movie ran in theatres from 15 December 1983 to 4 January 1984 and grossed a total of HK$14,102,667 million.

=== Screenings ===
In 1990 the film featured as part of Channel 4's "Chinese Ghost Story" season introduced by Jonathan Ross, being played alongside similar movies in the genre such as Encounters of the Spooky Kind, Zu Warriors from the Magic Mountain, Mr. Vampire, Spiritual Love and Rouge. The film was also shown 29 May 2010 at University of Toronto as part of Asian Heritage Month.

== Home media ==
The film has been released on VHS, Laserdisc, VCD, and DVD. It has been digitally remastered for Region 2 DVD (2007) by Universal Pictures Japan and for VCD and Region-All DVD (2008) by Joy Sales (Hong Kong).

== See also ==
- List of ghost films
