= Aces Go Places =

1982 Hong Kong film by Eric Tsang

- Film poster

Chinese name
- Traditional Chinese: 最佳拍檔
- Simplified Chinese: 最佳拍档
Transcriptions
Standard Mandarin
- Hanyu Pinyin: Zuì Jiā Pāi Dǎng
Yue: Cantonese
- Jyutping: Zeoi3 Gaai1 Paak3 Dong3
- Directed by: Eric Tsang
- Written by: Raymond Wong
- Produced by: Karl Maka; Dean Shek
- Starring: Samuel Hui; Karl Maka; Sylvia Chang; Dean Shek
- Cinematography: Joe Chan; Paul Yip; Manny Ho; Arthur Wong
- Edited by: Tony Chow
- Music by: Samuel Hui; Teddy Robin
- Distributed by: Cinema City & Films Co.
- Release date: 16 January 1982
- Running time: 93 minutes
- Country: Hong Kong
- Language: Cantonese
- Box office: HK$27.0 million

Aces Go Places, (Chinese: 最佳拍檔), also known in the United States as Diamondfinger or Mad Mission, is a 1982 Hong Kong action comedy film directed by Eric Tsang, and starring Samuel Hui, Karl Maka and Sylvia Chang. It is the first installment in the Aces Go Places film series.

== Plot ==
A suave, smooth burglar named King Kong tries to make up for his thieving ways by teaming up with Albert 'Baldy' Au, a bumbling Taishanese police detective from the United States. Both work together to try to find a set of stolen diamonds; the diamonds are also being tracked by a European criminal known as 'White Gloves'. The two heroes are supervised by Superintendent Nancy Ho, who has a temper.

== Cast ==
- Samuel Hui as "King Kong"
- Karl Maka as Albert Au
- Sylvia Chang as Superintendent Nancy Ho
- Dean Shek as Joe "Gigolo Joe" (special guest appearance)
- Tsui Hark as Ballerina Director (special guest appearance)
- Carroll Gordon as "Ding Dong"
- Chan Sing as Max "Mad Max"
- Anna Ng as Rose
- Lindzay Chan as Ballerina
- Veronica Lau as Mary
- Hon Kwok-choi as "Squealie"
- Sze Kai-keung as Laurel
- Cho Tat-wah as Uncle Wah
- Kam Piu as Szeto
- To Siu-ming as Tattoo Artist
- Robert Houston as "White Gloves"
- Jimmy Shaw as Monterosso
- Andrew Miller as Antonio
- Glen Thompson as Governor At Meeting
- Fung Ging Man as Senior Police Officer At Meeting
- Lee Pang-fei as Senior Police Officer At Meeting
- Ng Yan-chi as Senior Police Officer At Meeting
- Chik Ngai-hung as Rascal Who Gets Fresh With Ho
- Shing Wan-on as Cheong
- Lai Kim-hung as "Blubber Mouth"
- Tai San as Glove's Thug
- Wong Chi-wai as Glove's Thug Attacking King Kong
- Cheung Kwok-wah as Mad Max's Thug
- Chow Kam-kong as Mad Max's Thug
- Pang Yun-cheung as Mad Max's Thug
- Fung Yun-chuen as Diamond Verifier
- Cheng Siu-ping as Councillor Chan In Taxi
- Raymond Wong as Priest In Taxi (cameo)
- Yu Mo-lin as Nurse
- Ho Pak-kwong as Toilet Attendant
- George Lam as Ambulance Driver (cameo)
- Man Ngai-tik as Senior Naval Officer At Meeting

== Production ==
In 1981, Cinema City started producing Aces Go Places. Chow Yun-fat was initially selected as one of the main leads for the film but the company was afraid of his tight filming schedule. Tsui Hark then recommended Sam Hui to replace Chow. Hui demanded HK2 million in acting fees at a time when the budget for a small film is HK1 million. With approval from Golden Princess Amusement, Hui played one of the main leads. A major production for the company, Karl Maka was the other male main lead with cameos by Dean Shek, Raymond Wong and Hark and Taiwanese actress Sylvia Chang, who had just won Best Actress at the 18th Golden Horse Awards, as its main female lead.

== Accolades ==
Ceremony	Year	Category	Recipient(s)	Result	Ref.
Hong Kong Film Awards	1983	Best Actor	Karl Maka	Won	
Hong Kong Film Awards	1983	Best Actress	Sylvia Chang	Nominated	
Hong Kong Film Awards	1983	Best Original Film Score	Teddy Robin	Nominated	
Hong Kong Film Awards	1983	Best Original Film Song	"最佳拍檔" ("Aces Go Places")	Nominated	
