= Laughing Times =

1980 Hong Kong film by John Woo

- Film poster
- Traditional Chinese: 滑稽時代
- Simplified Chinese: 滑稽时代
- Hanyu Pinyin: Huá Jī Shí Dài
- Jyutping: Waat6 Kai2 Si4 Doi6
- Directed by: John Woo
- Screenplay by: John Woo
- Produced by: Karl Maka
- Starring: Dean Shek; Wong Wai; Karl Maka; Wu Ma; Lee Chung-keung; Chic Lau
- Cinematography: Manny Ho
- Edited by: Tony Chow
- Music by: Frankie Chan
- Production company: Cinema City
- Distributed by: Cinema City
- Release date: 24 December 1980
- Running time: 100 minutes
- Country: Hong Kong
- Language: Cantonese
- Box office: HK$5,186,448.50

Laughing Times (Chinese: 滑稽時代) is a 1980 Hong Kong adventure comedy film written and directed by John Woo. The film stars Dean Shek as the Chinese Charlie Chaplin. This is the first film produced by Cinema City, a film company established by Shek, Karl Maka and Raymond Wong.

== Plot ==
In the post-war community, where the economy is falling and many businesses are bleak, a starving wanderer named the Chinese Charlie Chaplin meets an orphan (Wong Wai) who was used to do illegal things by bad guy Master Ting and the two become fast friends. Later Charlie also meets a poor singer, whom he develops a funny romance with, and a drunkard. Due to humiliation from Ting, the drunkard turned to drinking. Later, Ting abducts the kid and the singer, prompting Charlie and the drunkard to finally rise up with ambition and risk their lives to save the kid and the singer and eventually, Ting was unable to evade the law.

== Cast ==
- Dean Shek as Chinese Charlie Chaplin
- Wong Wai as the Kid
- Karl Maka as Master Ting
- Wu Ma as Drunkard
- Lee Chung-keung
- Chic Lau
- Tai San as Man wearing shades
- Tsang Cho-lam as Barber Cheung
- Wong Sau-man as Singer
- Ho Pak-kwong as Chiu Siu-man's Father
- Hoi Sang Lee as bodyguard
- Fung King-man as Man eating noodle
- Chiu Chi-ling as street performer
- Wong Yat-fei as Man getting scalp
- Sai Gwa-Pau as Man who chokes on noodles
- Raymond Wong as Man eating banana
- Ting Yue
- Shing Wan-on
- Chan Fei-lung
- Luk Ying-hong
- Chu Tak-wai as policeman
- Ho Wan
- Leung Hung

== Box office ==
The film grossed HK$5,186,448.50 at the Hong Kong box office during its theatrical run from 24 December 1980 to 11 January 1981 in Hong Kong.

== Reception ==
Sean Gilman of Seattle Screen Scene called the film a "Chaplin homage".
