= Hello Babies =

2014 Chinese-Hong Kong film by Vincent Kok

- Hong Kong poster
- Directed by: Vincent Kok
- Written by: Chan Anselm; Cheng Wai Kei; Pun Chun-Lam
- Produced by: Raymond Wong
- Starring: Raymond Wong; Eric Tsang; Sandra Ng; Ronald Cheng; Fiona Sit; Alex Lam; Karena Ng
- Edited by: Ron Chan
- Music by: Dennie Wong Tan-Yee
- Production company: Pegasus Motion Pictures
- Release dates: 11 January 2014 (China); 28 January 2014 (Hong Kong)
- Running time: 94 minutes
- Countries: China; Hong Kong
- Languages: Cantonese; Mandarin Chinese
- Box office: US$11.17 million (China)

Hello Babies (Chinese: 六福喜事) is a 2014 Hong Kong-Chinese comedy film directed by Vincent Kok.

== Cast ==
- Raymond Wong
- Eric Tsang
- Sandra Ng
- Ronald Cheng
- Fiona Sit
- Alex Lam Dak Seon
- Karena Ng
- Miriam Yeung
- Louis Koo

== Release ==
Producer Raymond Wong lent the film at a fundraising event held by Silent Majority for Hong Kong, a political group which opposed the Occupy Central with Love and Peace movement.

== Reception ==
The film has grossed US$11.17 million at the Chinese box office. It was one of the highest grossing local films in 2014.
