= Chasing Girls =

1981 Hong Kong film by Karl Maka

- Film poster
- Traditional Chinese: 追女仔
- Simplified Chinese: 追女仔
- Hanyu Pinyin: Zhuī Nǚ Zǎi
- Jyutping: Zeoi1 Neoi2 Zai2
- Directed by: Karl Maka
- Screenplay by: Raymond Wong
- Produced by: Karl Maka
- Starring: Dean Shek; Flora Cheong-Leen; Nancy Lau; Eric Tsang
- Cinematography: Manny Ho
- Edited by: Tony Chow
- Music by: Teddy Robin
- Production company: Cinema City Films
- Release date: 7 August 1981
- Running time: 98 minutes
- Country: Hong Kong
- Language: Cantonese
- Box office: HK$9,464,742

Chasing Girls (Chinese: 追女仔) is a 1981 Hong Kong romantic comedy film directed by Karl Maka and starring Dean Shek, Flora Cheong-Leen, Nancy Lau and Eric Tsang. It was the second film produced by Cinema City, a film company established by Shek, producer/director Maka and screenwriter Raymond Wong. The film is a characteristic example of Hong Kong slapstick comedy of the 1980s.

== Plot ==
Robert fails school while studying abroad in America, because he spent too much time flirting with American girls and not enough time studying. Robert's mother, angry that her son has failed school, sends him back to Hong Kong to live with his aunt in hopes that he will marry a Chinese girl.

Returning to Hong Kong does not change Robert; he continues to spend all day flirting. His average-looking younger cousin, Ko Lo-chuen, wants to date a film star, Lam Siu-ha. Robert seems to be helping his cousin pursue her, but actually he wants to date her himself.

One night at a party, Robert notices a pretty rich girl named Fa who is working as a waitress. Ha sees Robert flirting with Fa, and, understandably hurt, she lambastes Fa, even though Robert tells her that nothing happened.

Fa is upset by Ha's behavior, and goes to her father to complain about her treatment. Robert's father then advises her on how to ruin Robert and Ha's relationship.

== Cast ==
- Dean Shek as Robert
- Flora Cheong-Leen as Lam Siu-ha
- Nancy Lau Nam-Kai as Tang Ah-fa
- Eric Tsang as Ko Lo-chuen
- Lau Sze-hong as Ko-lo Chuen's girlfriend
- Tang Kei-chan as Fa's dad
- Albert Lo as Lam Siu-ha's boyfriend
- Cheng Man-ha as Robert's mother
- Hui Ying-ying as Robert's aunt
- Chong Man-ching as Robert's girl match
- Wong Ngai-yee as Sister of Robert's girl match
- Sammo Hung as Man at airport (cameo)
- Karl Maka as Man at airport (cameo)
- Raymond Wong as Car salesman (cameo)
- Tang Mei-mei as Car seller
- Wong Mei-yee as Film salesgirl
- Cheng Lai-fong as Pak Suet-sin
- Hon Kwok-choi as Romeo
- Rebecca Chan as Air hostess (cameo)
- Lam Wai-han as Air hostess (cameo)
- Wong Sau-man as Red car owner (cameo)
- Marylinn Wong as Blind girl
- Man Kit-wah as beautiful girl in cafe
- Yu Mo-lin as Bookstore customer (cameo)
- Hui Bing-sam as Club singer in Trojan outfit
- Yeung Yau-ching as TV actor (cameo)
- To Siu-ming as Fake lawyer
- Tsang Cho-lam as Fake Lawyer
- Lucia Leung
- Leung Po-yee
- Leung Kit-wah
- Tsui Hark (cameo)
- Fung Fung (cut scene)
- Yue Tau-wan as Shae Ngai-kan
- Fong Ping as Robet's auntie's mahjong friend (cameo)
- Chan Chi-fai as Car driver (cameo)
- Fong Yue as Mother of beautiful girl in cafe

== Reception ==
The film grossed HK$9,464,742 at the Hong Kong box office during its theatrical run from 7 to 26 August 1981 in Hong Kong.
