= Shirley Tan =

Philippine-American LGBT activist

Shirley Tan is a Philippine-American gay, lesbian, bisexual, transgender activist who actively promotes gay and lesbian immigration rights in the United States.

== Background and activism for immigration rights ==
Shirley Tan was born in the Philippines, where she holds citizenship. Shirley Tan currently resides in Pacifica, California with her twin sons and her spouse, Jay Mercado. During her teen years, her mother and sister were murdered by her cousin. She studied in the United States and moved to California in 1986, when she overstayed her tourist visa to be with Jay Mercado, an American citizen. Tan returned to the Philippines for a short time, but decided to return to Mercado because the murderer of her mother and sister had been released from prison. Tan and Mercado met through their parents, who knew each other through Rotary International. The couple is still living together today, and they entered into a domestic partnership under California law in 2004.

Tan gave birth to twins in 1996. In an effort to become legalize her status in the United States, Tan applied for asylum in 1995. She was informed of the denial of her application 2009. She was arrested on January 28, 2009, at 6:30 am by Immigration and Customs Enforcement agents for remaining illegally in the US, before being tagged with an electronic monitoring bracelet and released back to her home. Tan wrote a letter recounting her experience to Senator Dianne Feinstein of California:

"My agonizing, humiliating and tragic experience started when I got in their SUV. My partner ran to the car and saw me being handcuffed and she broke down to tears. They handcuffed me. I was taken like a criminal. I thought it was the lowest point of my life, but when they transferred me to a van and I saw two men in it and had bars in between us, it was something I cannot imagine that will happen to my life. I was taken like a criminal. I was praying so hard for me to wake up, but it was not a dream. I was actually there. My heart was beating so hard, my whole body was shaking and I felt so nauseated with what was happening to me."
