= Crazy Crooks =

1980 Hong Kong film by Karl Maka

- Film poster
- Traditional Chinese: 瘋狂大老千
- Simplified Chinese: 疯狂大老千
- Hanyu Pinyin: Fēng Kuáng Dà Lǎo Qiān
- Jyutping: Fung1 Kwong4 Daai6 Lou2 Cin1
- Directed by: Karl Maka
- Screenplay by: Raymond Wong
- Produced by: Karl Maka
- Starring: Dean Shek; Karl Maka
- Cinematography: Manny Ho
- Edited by: Tony Chow
- Music by: Frankie Chan
- Production company: Warriors Films
- Release date: 14 February 1980
- Running time: 95 minutes
- Country: Hong Kong
- Language: Cantonese
- Box office: HK$3,123,277

Crazy Crooks is a 1980 Hong Kong comedy film produced and directed by Karl Maka and starring Dean Shek and Maka. Shek plays a master swindler who teams up with a less-than-competent amateur swindler (Maka) to scam money from a tycoon which turns out to be counterfeit bills, and end up being targeted for murder by the tycoon.

== Plot ==
Mo-pei-chai is a master swindler with a sassy wife and ten children who might not all be his due to his wife's numerous affairs with many men. After endless verbal abuse from his wife, Mo-pei-chai leaves his family for good and bumps into Kwong-kwan-chat, another swindler who is rather bumbling. Kwong-kwan-chat unsuccessfully tries to swindle Mo-pei-chai, who outsmarts him. The two later bump into each other again where Kwong-kwan-chat tries to play tricks on Mo-pei-chai but end up suffering from his own deeds. Afterwards, a middle man hired by Kwong-kwan-chat has arranged a gambling match with a deceiving tycoon, Old Wai, which Mo-pei-chai overhears and proposes a collaboration with Kwong-kwan-chat to swindle the tycoon where Mo-pei-chai uses a magic trick to turn blank paper into American currency to gamble while Kwong-kwan-chat poses as the local Security Captain and confiscate the tycoon's money. Although Old Wai turns out to be the father-in-law of the real Security Captain, they are successful in their scam. Afterwards, Mo-pei-chai and Kwong-kwan-chat get into a hilarious fight while splitting the money where Mo-pei-chai outsmarts Kwong-kwan-chat again and leads him arrested by the Security Captain and imprisoned. However, Kwong-kwan-chat rats Mo-pei-chai as his accomplice and the latter is wanted for a bounty as a result. A clever child, Mak Tau, manages to turn Mo-pei-chai in to the police.

Mo-pei-chai and Kwong-kwan-chat are imprisoned together but the latter has hidden tools to make a saw into his shoes and escapes, but Kwong-kwan-chat manages to convince Mo-pei-chai to get him out as well and proposes to swindle Old Wai again, but Mo-pei-chai dissuades him, realizing Old Wai was using counterfeits. It turns out Old Wai works for the town's biggest tycoon and philanthropist Tong Sei-nau, who orders Old Wai to kill Mo-pei-chai and Kwong-kwan-chat too cover up their crimes. Mo-pei-chai devises a plan to steal Old Wai's jewelries by having Kwong-kwan-chat slap Old Wai but when they execute the plan, they end up being beaten up by Wai's bodyguards, Iron Cow and Crazy Horse after a long fight.

Mo-pei-chai and Kwong-kwan-chat bump into Mak Tau and intend to punish him but encounter gang leader Ko-lo-sam, his wife Second Lady Lan, and brother Snake-eye To who wants to buy Mak Tau. They manage to outsmart Ko-lo-sam, but Mak Tau manages to flee. Mo-pei-chai and Kwong-kwan-chat then bump into Iron Cow and Crazy Horse who chase them, but Mak Tau helps them flee. The two men befriend the child and find out he is being hunted by Mok-ming and Kei-miu, a pair of married master martial artists who have gone insane from perfecting their skills. After Mo-pei-chai and Kwong-kwan-chat bring Mak Tau to hide in a temple, but Ko-lo-sam, Second Lady Lan and Third Brother To finds them. After a prolonged fight, Mo-pei-chai and Kwong-kwan-chat defeat the three, so Ko-lo-sam bring in Mok-ming and Kei-miu instead, who Mo-pei-chai and Kwong-kwan-chat are unable to overpower but they manage to tie the couple up as nd flee.

Mo-pei-chai and Kwong-kwan-chat put Mak Tau to sleep while they relieve their injuries and discuss about sending Mak Tau away as he is too much of a hassle, which the child overhears. The next morning, the two decide to not send the Mak Tau away, but is horrified to find the child gone, leaving drawings behind saying he is an orphan without a home and treated them as his only family and berates them for kicking him out. Mo-pei-chai and Kwong-kwan-chat spends the whole day unsuccessfully looking for Mak Tau. Afterwards, they encounter a young lady in a restaurant who informs them she is searching for her grandfather, who is an artist and maker of the counterfeit cash they show her. She informs the two that her grandfather was kidnapped by Tong while painting a portrait for Mok-ming and Kei-miu, who were his neighbors and went insane after their unborn child died and swears to kill Tong's son. At this time, Tong also sends his idiotic underlings to search for his son, who has an unusual birthmark of three dices on his buttocks. Mo-pei-chai and Kwong-kwan-chat discovers Tong's plan from his underlings who are searching on the streets and bumps into Mak Tau, who is held captive by Mok-ming and Kei-miu at the same time, and rescues him away while they fight unsuccessfully the couple and are captured by the couple who intend to barbeque Mo-pei-chai and stew Kwong-kwan-chat but Mak Tau comes in time to rescue them, telling the child to meet them at a tea stall afterwards. When Mo-pei-chai and Kwong-kwan-chat arrive at the tea stall, they find out Mak Tau has been abducted by Tong, who has also abducted the young lady looking for her grandfather while Tong shows her grandfather having gone insane while making counterfeit for him.

Tong poses as the young lady and writes a letter to Mo-pei-chai and Kwong-kwan-chat, who sneak into Tai's mansion and rescue Mak Tau after defeating Iron Cow and Crazy Horse. Mo-pei-chai and Kwong-kwan-chat then discover Mak Tau is Tong's son after seeing his unusual birthmark and sends him to Tong hoping to collect the bounty reward. Upon arriving at Tong's mansion, Mo-pei-chai and Kwong-kwan-chat realize Tong intends to kill the two to cover up his crimes and attempt to flee but only Mak Tau is successful in doing so while the two men are captured. However, with the help of the young lady, Mo-pei-chai and Kwong-kwan-chat are able to make a run and temporary hide wedding banquet of neighbor Mr. San's son until Tong, Iron Cow and Crazy Horse arrive. A big fight erupts where Mo-pei-chai and Kwong-kwan-chat manage to defeat Iron Cow and Crazy Horse with the help of laxatives, but are no match for Tong, who is an expert fighter. Mak Tau arrives with Mok-ming and Kei-miu who fight and defeat Tong. Kei-miu is suddenly pregnant again and happily leaves with Mok-ming while Mo-pei-chai says it is time to part ways with Kwong-kwan-chat but really intends to woo the young lady. While Mo-pei-chai is on a date with the young lady and Mak Tau, Kwong-kwan-chat surprises him with his wife and ten children.

== Cast ==
- Dean Shek as Mo-pei-chai (冇皮柴), a slick, master swindler.
- Karl Maka as Kwong-kwan-chat (光棍七), a bumbling swindler who becomes Mo-pei-chai's partner in crime.
- Chan Kwok-kuen as Tong Sei-ngau (唐死牛), the town's richest tycoon and philanthropist with the title "Gold Master" (金爺), who is a really counterfeiter.
- Yung Wai-man as a young lady whose grandfather was kidnapped by Tong to make counterfeits for him and gone insane as a result.
- Peter Chan as Mok-ming (莫名), an insane, master martial artist and head of the Ching San Clan (青山派).
- Lau Nga-lai as Kei-miu (奇妙), Kei-miu's wife who is also an insane, master martial artist.
- Tai San as Crazy Horse, Tong's bodyguard.
- Cheung Kwok-wah as Iron Cow (鐵牛), Tong's bodyguard.
- Ho Pak-kwong as the Security Captain's son-in-law who works for Tong.
- Raymond Wong as Ko-lo-sam (高佬森), leader of the Kwai Tit Gang (拐鐵幫) who wants to buy Mak Tau.
- To Siu-ming as Snake-eye To (蛇呢杜), Ko-lo-sam's younger brother and underling.
- Wong Ngai-yee as Second Lady Lan (姣婆蘭), Ko-lo-sam's wife.
- Cheng Ying-ho as Mak Tau (麥斗), a clever orphan who befriends Mo-pei-chai and Kwong-kwan-chat.
- Chiu Chi-ling as the police boxing instructor.
- Lee Sau-kei as Master San (申翁), Tong's neighbor whose retarded son is getting married.
- Hui Ying-ying as Mrs. San (申夫人), Master San's wife.
- Tsang Cho-lam as middleman arranging gambling.
- Danny Au as the local Security Captain.
- Lee Chung-keung
- Cho Chai
- Pong Cheuk-lam as the young lady's grandfather who is an artist kidnapped by Tong to make counterfeit currency.
- Hui Suk-han
- Shing Wan-on
- Mak Kwok-hon
- Leung Hung

== Theme song ==
- Crazy Crooks (瘋狂大老千)
  - Composer: Michael Lai
  - Lyricist: Lo Kwok-chim
  - Singer: Jenny Tseng

== Box office ==
The film grossed HK$3,123,277 at the Hong Kong box office during its theatrical run from 14 to 27 February 1980.
