= For Your Heart Only =

1985 Hong Kong film by Raymond Fung

- Blu-ray cover
- Traditional Chinese: 為你鍾情
- Simplified Chinese: 为你钟情
- Hanyu Pinyin: wèi nǐ zhōng qíng
- Jyutping: wai4 nei5 zung1 cing4
- Directed by: Raymond Fung
- Written by: Li Kui Ming; Raymond Fung; Clifton Ko
- Produced by: Raymond Wong Pak-ming
- Starring: Leslie Cheung; Loletta Lee; Ann Bridgewater; Bonnie Law; Mang Hoi; Jimmy Wong
- Cinematography: Bob Thompson
- Edited by: Kwok Chung Chow
- Music by: Danny Chung
- Production company: Cinema City
- Distributed by: Cinema City
- Release date: 7 September 1985 (Hong Kong)
- Running time: 85 minutes
- Country: Hong Kong
- Language: Cantonese
- Box office: HK$7,880,942

For Your Heart Only (Chinese: 為你鍾情; pinyin: wèi nǐ zhōng qíng) is a 1985 Hong Kong romance film directed by Raymond Fung, starring Leslie Cheung, Loletta Lee, Bonnie Law, Ann Bridgewater, Mang Hoi and Jimmy Wong. The film ran in theaters from 7 September 1985 until 19 September 1985.

== Plot ==
The film centers around DJ Piggy Chan (Leslie Cheung), who falls in love at first sight with Jane Yu (Loletta Lee), he wins her heart on their first date. Soon after that, Jane goes to the club Piggy works at to visit him, she sees Piggy flirting with other woman, she becomes angry and they broke up on the spot. On the other hand, Piggy's best friend, Sapi (Mang Hoi) falls in love with Piggy's sister, Mable Chan (Ann Bridgewater). Piggy wants Mable to focus on school, so forces her to break up Sapi. Piggy and Sapi quarreled and started fighting, Sapi fainted and was rushed to the hospital. Because of this fight, Sapi's kidneys suffered damage, the doctors told Piggy that Sapi was going to die soon. Piggy and his friends decide to throw Sapi a surprise party, to hope Sapi live the remaining days of his life happily, at the end of the party, Sapi said he hopes that Piggy and Jane will get back together. After Sapi's funeral, they finally got back together.

== Cast ==
- Leslie Cheung as Piggy Chan (陳福水) - Broke up with Jane, got back together in the end, likes to flirt with girls
- Loletta Lee as Jane Yu (余麗珍) - Broke up with Piggy, got back together in the end, a nurse
- Ann Bridgewater as Mable Chan (福水妹) - Piggy's sister, in love with Sapi
- Bonnie Law as Judy Mak (阿珠) - Jane's roommate, a nurse
- Mang Hoi as Sapi (沙皮) - Piggy's best friend, in love with Mable, dies because of a kidney disease
- Jimmy Wong as Hayden (海胆) - Piggy's cousin, still in college
- Ngan Lee as Jane's mother - Very protective over her daughter
- Wellington Fung as Piggy's father - Has a gambling addiction
- Clifton Ko as Doctor
- Chi Ling Chiu as BMW Owner
- Fui-On Shing as BMW Owner's Thug
- Wan-On Shing as BMW Owner's Thug
- Raymond Fung as Hospital Visitor (cameo)

== Critical response ==
"They have captured a very interesting story about how the young kids growing in Hong Kong. How the Hongkongers have fun with their friends. And how the youngsters fall in love...........lots of in-jokes with a true version of a natural blend of a group of HK Chinese living in a westernized city like Hong Kong.........it has that subtle touch with true feelings of how they feel about each other. A first Hong Kong prototype of its own in this genre............ this is still a very entertaining story at all times." ----- IMDb (6.4/10 based on 87 user reviews)

"Filled with telling observations of youth, and fresh-faced, compelling performances from the young cast, For Your Heart Only is a touching tale of first love and sudden heartbreak." ----- MyDramaList (7.6/10 based on 10 user reviews)

On the Chinese movie review website, Douban, it received an average rating of 7.4 out of 10 based on 7303 user reviews.
