= Happy Ghost II =

1985 Hong Kong film by Clifton Ko

- Original British Hong Kong poster.
- Traditional Chinese: 開心鬼放暑假
- Simplified Chinese: 开心鬼放暑假
- Hanyu Pinyin: Kai xin gui fang shu jia
- Jyutping: hoi1 sam1 gwai2 fong3 syu2 gaa2
- Directed by: Clifton Ko
- Written by: Raymond Wong
- Produced by: Raymond Wong
- Starring: Raymond Wong; Fennie Yuen; May Lo; Charine Chan; Gigi Fu
- Cinematography: Bob Thompson
- Edited by: Tony Chow
- Music by: Mahmood Rum Jahn
- Production company: Cinema City Film Co. Ltd.
- Distributed by: Golden Princess Amusement Co. Ltd.
- Release date: 18 July 1985
- Running time: 96 minutes
- Country: Hong Kong
- Language: Cantonese
- Box office: HK$16,602,480

Happy Ghost II (Chinese: 開心鬼放暑假) is a 1985 Hong Kong comedy film directed by Clifton Ko. Produced and written by Raymond Wong, the film stars Wong, Fennie Yuan, May Lo, Charine Chan and Gigi Fu. This film is the sequel to Happy Ghost. Although the film grossed less than its prequel, it was the 10th most grossing film in Hong Kong that year. The film is about Happy Ghost / Scholar Stewart Pik (Raymond Wong Pak-ming) gets reincarnated and is now a high school teacher called Hong Sam Kwai, born with natural superpowers but doesn't know how to use them. He is assigned to teach a class full of naughty students who likes to play pranks. He becomes a victim of his students, but with the help of a school worker (Kee-Chan Tang), he knows how to avoid the pranks. Some boys from a boy school nearby falls in love with Kwai's students and Kwai falls in love with the boys' class teacher.

== Cast ==
- Raymond Wong Pak-ming as Steward Pik (朱錦春) - The Happy Ghost
- Raymond Wong Pak-ming as Hong Sam-Kwai (康森貴) - High school teacher, Steward Pik's afterlife
- Fennie Yuen as Thai Chek-Yee (戴卓儀) - High school student, arrogant
- May Lo as May Ken (簡靜美) - High school student, love snacks
- Charine Chan as Yiu-King (姚瓊) - High school student, has a crush on Sam-Kwai
- Gigi Fu as Akina (趙明菜) - High school student, loves to dress up
- Jeanne Kanai as Miss Lo (老老師) - Works at a boy's high school
- Kee-Chan Tang as Uncle Tang (鄧伯) - High school canteen worker
- Chuen Hau Lee as Michael Jackson Ko (高帶水) - High school student, has a crush on Chek-Yee
- Kong-Yin Wong as Pan Zai-An (潘再安) - High school student, has a crush on Akina
- Hung-Cheung Leung as Paul Chan - High school student, has a crush on May
- Man-No Chen as Headmistress - Has a crush on Sam-Kwai
- Kwong Lam Tsui as Deputy headmaster Chu - Snobbish
- Melvin Wong as Rival coach - High school teacher, Sam-Kwai's rival in love
- Gigi Lai as High school student
- Clifton Ko as Diving judge (cameo)

== Release ==
=== Box office ===
Happy Ghost was a hit for Cinema City and grossed a total of HK$16,602,480. The movie ran in theaters from 18 July 1985 to 7 August 1985.

== See also ==
- Clifton Ko filmography
- List of Hong Kong films of 1985
