= Ambitious Kung Fu Girl =

1982 Hong Kong film by Lu Chin Ku

- Theatrical poster to Ambitious Kung Fu Girl (1982)
- Directed by: Lu Chin Ku
- Produced by: Sir Run Run Shaw
- Starring: Michelle Yim; Yuen Tak; Chen Kwan-Tai; Hui Tien Chi; Cheng Miu; Lam Fai-Wong
- Distributed by: Shaw Brothers Studio
- Release date: 1982
- Country: Hong Kong
- Language: Mandarin

Ambitious Kung Fu Girl is a Shaw Brothers film directed by Lu Chin Ku, starring Chen Kuan Tai and Michelle Yim.

== Plot ==
Spoiled and with her head permanently in the clouds, Yuen Si Si (Yim) - naive daughter of an affluent merchant - lives her cosseted life dreaming of a meeting with her idol Qin Ge (Chen Kwan-Tai). Qin Ge is a kung-fu celebrity somewhat out of reach though and Si Si's wealthy father decides to marry her of to his friend's son, Yang Fan (Tak). Obviously an arranged marriage is anathema to the fiercely independent young woman and she sneaks out of the house with the intention of finding her beloved Qin Ge. What she doesn't realise though is that the kung-fu skills she thinks will protect her are merely a pretence, cleverly engineered to boost her ego by her over-protective father. It isn't too long into her misadventure that the formerly hermitic Si Si discovers that the world outside is far from being the world of chivalry that she expected and there are people practically lining up to take advantage of her. Not too far behind her is Yang Fan who is keen to save his fiancée more for the reward offered by her father than any feelings of affection for her.
