= Mandarin Films Distribution Co. Ltd. =

Defunct Hong Kong and chinese film production and distribution company

- Type: Subsidiary, Film distributor, production company
- Industry: Hong Kong cinema
- Predecessor: Cinema City Enterprises (1979-1991)
- Founded: 1991
- Founder: Raymond Wong Pak-Ming
- Headquarters: Causeway Bay, Hong Kong, China
- Key people: Raymond Wong Pak-Ming
- Products: film
- Website: http://www.mandarinfilms.com

Mandarin Films Distribution Co. Ltd or Mandarin Cinema (Chinese: 東方電影發行有限公司), formerly known as Mandarin Films Ltd. (Chinese: 東方電影出品有限公司), is a Hong Kong film production company and distributor. It was established in 1991 by film producer Raymond Wong Pak-Ming, and is a subsidiary of Mandarin Entertainment Holdings Ltd.

== Company ==
Since its foundation, Mandarin has produced, licensed, and distributed films including Eighteen Spring, The Phantom Lover, The Bride with White Hair, Dragon Tiger Gate, and Flash Point. Mandarin Films has produced more than 85 films for distribution around the world.

In 2001, Mandarin Films listed its share in the Hong Kong Stock Exchange. With recent strong international interest in Chinese films and new government initiatives to promote films of Hong Kong, Mandarin Films is well placed.
