= Prison on Fire =

1987 Hong Kong film by Ringo Lam

- Film poster

Chinese name
- Traditional Chinese: 監獄風雲
- Simplified Chinese: 监狱风云
Transcriptions
Standard Mandarin
- Hanyu Pinyin: Jiān Yù Fēng Yún
Yue: Cantonese
- Jyutping: Gaam1 Juk6 Fung1 Wan4
- Directed by: Ringo Lam
- Written by: Nam Yin
- Produced by: Karl Maka; Catherine S.K. Chang
- Starring: Chow Yun-fat; Tony Leung Ka-fai; Roy Cheung
- Cinematography: Lau Hung-chuen; Joe Chan Kwong-hung; Wong Man-wan; Jingle Ma; Cho Wai-kei; Cinema City Cinematographers Unit
- Edited by: Cinema City Production Co. Ltd. Editing Unit
- Music by: Lowell Lo
- Distributed by: Cinema City & Films Co.
- Release date: 13 November 1987
- Running time: 101 minutes
- Country: Hong Kong
- Language: Cantonese
- Box office: HK$31,622,805

Prison on Fire is a 1987 Hong Kong prison film directed by Ringo Lam and starring Chow Yun-fat and Tony Leung Ka-fai.

A sequel, Prison on Fire II, was released in 1991.

== Plot ==
Advertising designer Lo Ka-yiu is convicted of manslaughter, for accidentally pushing the robber of his father's grocery store into the street and under a passing bus, and is sentenced to three years imprisonment in a Hong Kong prison.

He is assigned for work at the prison where he befriends Chung Tin-ching. Yiu asks to be transferred to the laundry where Ching is working where he observes a member of boss Micky's triad gang steal scissors from Ching, to use as a weapon. Yiu tells Ching who retrieves the scissors, but as a consequence Yiu gets bullied by Micky's gang members.

During a shakedown of the cells, guards discover prohibited items and Yiu, Micky and another triad boss, Bill, are brought to Officer Hung, nicknamed "Scarface" by the prisoners, for questioning. Hung attempts to recruit Yiu as an informant and fails. Hung questions Micky, asking him to let Micky's henchmen search for tools that went missing in the prison work shops. In return Hung offers to transfer one of Micky's rivals to a different prison. Micky proposes that Yiu blamed one of Bill's men. Hung accepts the deal and transfers several triad members to another prison as "punishment."

The following night Yiu is dragged into the prison lavatory by Micky's men and beaten when Ching fails to stop them. When one of the guards hears the beating and intervenes, Yiu lies that he slipped.

Yiu's girlfriend visits him in prison and announces she is leaving to study in England for nine months, Yiu unable to convince her to stay. Later that day, Micky approaches Yiu in the laundry to demand compensation for the punishment of his triad men and a brawl ensues. Yiu fends off his opponents with a shard of glass until the guards arrive and accidentally injures Ching.

Yiu and Ching are summoned by the prison warden. When asked what started the fight Ching accuses Hung of having tricked Yiu. The warden promises to have the case investigated and moves both into temporary solitary confinement as punishment. Micky is ultimately moved to a different prison.

A year later on New Year's Eve, Ching tells Yiu why he's imprisoned: four years ago he caught his wife prostituting herself, for which he unintentionally killed her before finally attempting suicide. However, he was charged with murder. Their son now lives with the grandmother and regularly visits him in prison.

The following summer Micky is transferred back to the prison. He's still seeking revenge since being a triad boss he was never assaulted before. Yiu asks Officer Hung to move him and Ching to a different prison, but Hung brushes him off. During the next prison inspection, Yiu approaches the inspector and demands a transfer to protect them from the triads. Hung - who's also present during the inspection - denies the presence of triads among the prisoners and claims the two were having problems due to gambling debts. The warden requests a report, but ultimately Yiu and Ching have to remain in the prison.

Some time later, the members of Bill's triad initiate a hunger strike to protest against a price surge for cigarettes. Micky's men and the other prisoners join the strike. Hung approaches Micky and demands him to stop the strike, otherwise he'd put all triad leaders in solitary confinement while telling them Micky had accused them of initiating the strike. Micky doesn't want to rat them out and instead defames Yiu as the instigator. In addition Hung whispers to Ching in the presence of the others, alluding Ching would rat on them. When the prison warden enters the room he demands everyone to resume their meals. While Micky obeys, Hung threatens Ching to also resume eating, to which Ching and Yiu retaliate out of rage on one hand and also to prove that they have not betrayed the inmates. In the end, they are restrained and Hung has them moved back to the cell (where they are at the mercy of the triads).

Once the guards are gone, Micky's men start beating Yiu and Ching. However, having lost the respect of the inmates by giving up on the hunger strike, other inmates stop the lynching and demand that Micky fights Ching one to one. In the ensuing chaos, Mickey’s henchmen are blocked by other inmates from intervening, and Mickey gets brutally beaten by Ching under the cheering from the other inmates. In the meantime the guards are alarmed by the noise of the fight, but are unable to take action since the absent Hung locked up the cell. Ching wins the upper hand against Micky and almost strangles him to death with a bed pole. When the guards manage to get a hold of Hung and storm the cell, Ching needs to let go of Micky who he had almost killed. A huge brawl arises and Ching knocks Hung down with a drop-kick from a bunk bed. Laughing madly he jumps on Hung and bites his ear off.

Months later Yiu is released from prison and being welcomed from his family and his girlfriend. When leaving the prison they see how Ching (who had been moved to a hospital after the fight) is moved back to the prison in a bus.

== Cast ==
- Chow Yun-fat as Chung Tin-ching
- Tony Leung Ka-fai as Lo Ka-yiu
- Roy Cheung as Officer 'Scarface' Hung
- Frankie Ng as Blind Snake
- Shing Fui-on as Big Fool
- William Ho as Micky
- Tommy Wong as Bill
- Terrence Fok as Yung
- Nam Yin as Prisoner's Head

== Critical reception ==
DVD Talk, "Prison on Fire is a terrific Hong Kong prison drama that fans of Chow Yun Fat, Tong Leung, or director Ringo Lam should definitely check out."

== Accolades ==
Accolades
Ceremony	Category	Recipient	Outcome
7th Hong Kong Film Awards	Best Director	Ringo Lam	Nominated
7th Hong Kong Film Awards	Best Screenplay	Nam Yin	Nominated
7th Hong Kong Film Awards	Best Actor	Chow Yun-fat	Nominated
7th Hong Kong Film Awards	Best Supporting Actor	William Ho	Nominated
7th Hong Kong Film Awards	Best Supporting Actor	Roy Cheung	Nominated
7th Hong Kong Film Awards	Best New Performer	Tommy Wong	Nominated
7th Hong Kong Film Awards	Best Original Film Score	Lowell Lo	Nominated
7th Hong Kong Film Awards	Best Original Film Song	Song: Full of Hope (充滿希望) Composer: Lowell Lo; Lyricist: John Chong; Singer: Maria Cordero	Nominated

== See also ==
- Chow Yun-fat filmography
- List of Hong Kong films
