= Karl Maka =

Hong Kong actor and director

- Chinese: 麥嘉
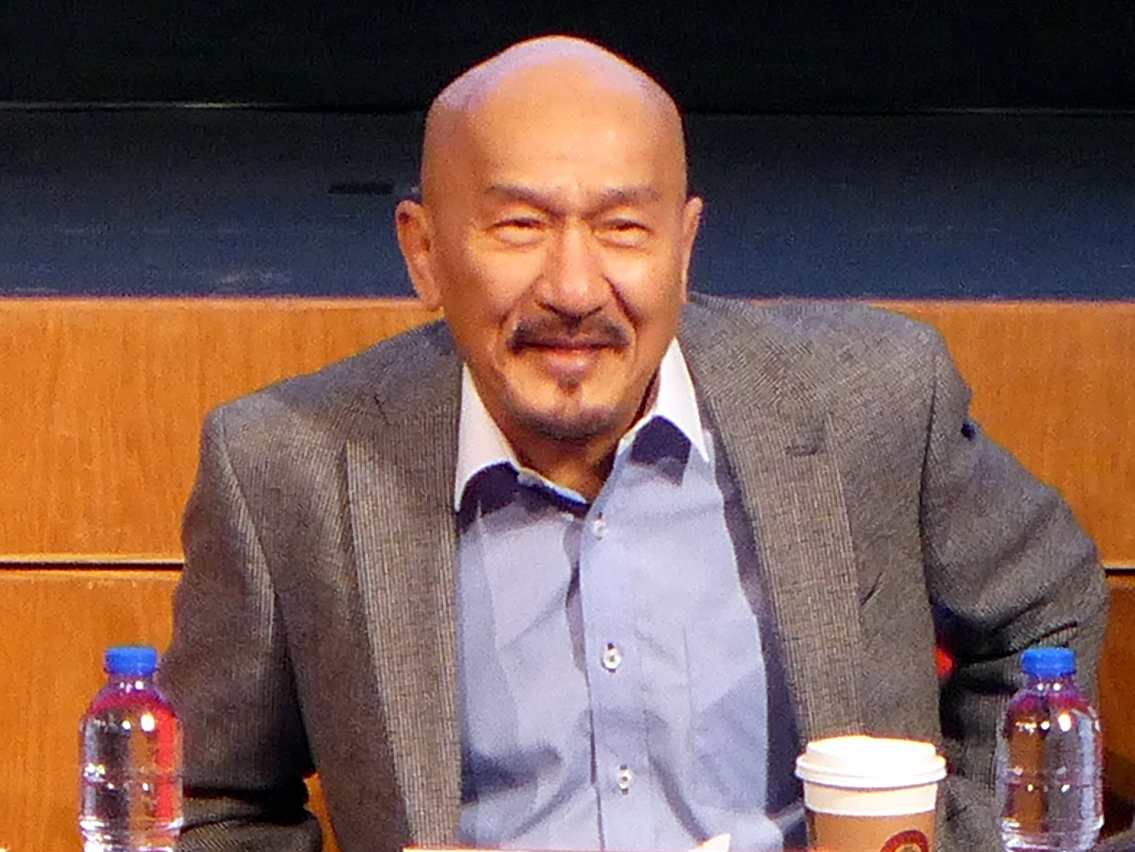
- Maka at The Wit and Wisdom of Cinema City event held at the Hong Kong Film Archive on 9 April 2016.
- Born: Mak Kar-sheung (Chinese: 麥嘉尚); 29 February 1944 (age 82); Taishan, Republic of China
- Other names: Carl Mak, Mak Kar, Kar Mak, Kais Mak, Kar S. Mak, Mak Ka
- Occupations: Film producer; director; actor; presenter
- Years active: 1975–2016
- Awards: Hong Kong Film Awards – Best Actor; 1982 Aces Go Places

Chinese name
- Traditional Chinese: 麥嘉
- Simplified Chinese: 麦嘉
Transcriptions
Standard Mandarin
- Hanyu Pinyin: Mài Jiā
Yue: Cantonese
- Jyutping: maak^{6} gaa^{1}

Karl Maka (born 29 February 1944) is a Hong Kong film producer, director, actor and presenter.

== Early life ==
Maka was born Mak Kar-sheung on 29 February 1944 in Taishan, Guangdong. He moved to Hong Kong in 1958 when he was 14 years old.

== Education ==
Maks moved to the United States in 1963 and in 1969, Maka earned a Bachelor of Science degree in Electronics Engineering from the Polytechnic Institute of Brooklyn. He then began studying film production at the New York Institute of Photography.

== Career ==
While a student at the New York Institute of Photography, Maka started his career as a telephone company engineer before returning to Hong Kong in 1973.

In 1976, Maka began working in the Hong Kong film industry. He first appeared as an assassin in The Good, the Bad and the Loser (1976), which he wrote and directed. In 1978, Maka co-founded the film production company Gar Bo. In 1980, Maka founded Cinema City Enterprises. Maka is credited with over 35 films as an actor, over 30 films as a producer, 7 films as a writer and 10 films as a director.

One of Maka's most popular film roles is in the Aces Go Places film series, where he starred alongside Sam Hui.

== Filmography ==
=== Films ===
Year	Title	Role	Notes/Ref.
1976	The Good, the Bad and the Loser		writer / director
1977	Mian meng xin jing		actor
1977	He Has Nothing But Kung Fu	Sheriff	actor
1977	Winner Takes All		writer / director
1978	Hello, Late Homecomers	Baldy	actor
1978	Dirty Kung Fu		actor
1978	Dirty Tiger, Crazy Frog		writer / director
1979	Iron Fists		actor / director
1979	Knockabout	Police Captain	actor
1979	Odd Couple	Challenger	cameo / producer
1979	His Name Is Nobody	Baldy	actor / director
1979	Xin tie cuo men shen		actor
1980	Crazy Crooks	Kong Koon Chat	actor / director
1980	The Victim	Shaolin Abbot	actor / producer
1980	By Hook or by Crook	Sheriff Butcher Wing	actor / director
1981	Beware of Pickpockets	Big Nose	actor / producer
1981	Bu zhun diao tou		
1981	All the Wrong Clues	Capone	actor / producer
1981	Chasing Girls		cameo / director / producer
1981	Laughing Times	Master Ting	actor
1982	It Takes Two		actor / director
1982	Aces Go Places	Albert Au	actor / producer
1982	Life After Life		producer
1983	Aces Go Places 2	Albert Au	actor
1983	Wo ai Ye Laixiang	Patriot (prologue)	actor
1983	Da zhui ji		actor
1983	Esprit d'amour		producer
1984	Aces Go Places 3	Albert Au	actor
1984	Lifeline Express		producer
1984	Merry Christmas		actor
1984	The Occupant		producer
1985	Gong xi fa cai	Gold Grabber	actor
1985	For Your Heart Only		producer
1986	Aces Go Places IV	Albert Au	actor / writer
1986	Lucky Stars Go Places	Albert	actor
1987	City on Fire		producer
1987	Prison on Fire		producer
1987	The Thirty Million Dollar Rush	Baldy	actor / writer / director / producer
1988	The Eighth Happiness	Audience Member	cameo
1988	School on Fire		producer
1988	Tiger on Beat		producer
1989	Aces Go Places 5: The Terracotta Hit	Albert Au 'Baldy'	actor / producer
1989	Triads: The Inside Story		producer
1990	Chicken a La Queen		producer
1990	Skinny Tiger, Fatty Dragon	Skinny	Also as producer.
1990	Tiger on the Beat 2		producer
1990	Undeclared War		producer
1991	The Magnificent Scoundrels	Master	actor / producer
1991	The Banquet	Mak	cameo
1991	In the Lap of God		producer
1991	Prison on Fire 2		producer
2000	Winner Takes All	Inspector Stupid	actor
2003	Zen Master		actor
2016	The Bodyguard	Old Man	cameo, (final film role)

== Awards ==
Maka has received a star on the Avenue of Stars in Tsim Sha Tsui.

== Personal life ==
In 1963, Maka and his family emigrated to the United States and lived in New York City. He returned to Hong Kong in 1973.

Awards and achievements
Preceded by Michael Hui for Security Unlimited	Hong Kong Film Award for Best Actor; 1982 for Aces Go Places	Succeeded by Tony Leung Ka-fai for Reign Behind the Curtain
