= Sai Gwa-Pau =

Hong Kong actor (1918–2001)

Lim Gan (Chinese: 林根, 7 October 1918 – 12 March 2001), known professionally as Sai Gwa-Pau (Chinese: 西瓜刨; Jyutping: sai1 gwaa1 paau4; lit. 'watermelon peeler') , was a Hong Kong film actor who played roles in over 600 movies from the 1950s onward. His stage name referred to his prominent protruding upper teeth. Sai Gwa-pau was well known for his comic roles and in particular his role (牙擦蘇) in the film series based on the exploits of Wong Fei-hung.

== Selected filmography ==
- Wong Fei-hung film series (zh:黃飛鴻系列影視)
- Naughty! Naughty!
- Bolo (1979) as Old Bucktooth

== See also ==
- Osomatsu-kun
