= Golden Princess Film Production =

Hong Kong production company and film distributor

Golden Princess Film Production Ltd.
- Type: Production company
- Industry: Hong Kong cinema
- Headquarters: Hong Kong

Golden Princess Film Production (Chinese: 金公主電影製作有限公司) was a Hong Kong production company and film distributor.

== History ==
The company was established as Golden Princess Amusement Co. Ltd., which originally distributed Western films and ran a circuit of theatres located on the major streets of Hong Kong in the late 1970s. This enterprise was backed by Lawrence Louey (雷覺坤), a director of Kowloon Development Company whose family owned Kowloon Motor Bus at the time.

Having invested in independent film companies like Cinema City in the 1980s, Golden Princess began to distribute Chinese-language films. In conjunction with Cinema City, they became the third major distributor of Hong Kong cinema, competing with Shaw Brothers and Golden Harvest for nearly a decade.

Later, when Cinema City's productions slowed down, Golden Princess set up its own company, Golden Princess Film Production Ltd. The first film made was I Love Maria (1988). It also produced many films directed by John Woo before his transition to Hollywood, including The Killer (1989), Bullet in the Head (1990), Once a Thief (1991), and Hard Boiled (1992).

Louey died in 1992. With Louey's death and the decline of the Hong Kong film market in the mid-1990s, Golden Princess eventually withdrew from the film theater, distribution and production businesses. Its last film, Peace Hotel (1995), was also Chow Yun-fat's last starring role in Hong Kong before his transition to Hollywood. Its film library was acquired by Star TV.

In 2025, home video company Shout! Studios announced that they had acquired the worldwide rights (outside select Asian countries) for 156 Hong Kong films from the Golden Princess library. They planned to release these titles on physical media and on their streaming service. This will be the first time in these titles will be available in the United States. British film distributor Arrow Films reached a deal with Shout! Studios to handle the library's distribution in the United Kingdom. Arrow is aiming for a 2026 release, with the first wave of titles through their own Arrow Video label. Metropolitan Film is releasing titles for the French-speaking market, and Plaion Pictures for German-speaking markets (Germany, Austria, and Switzerland). Australian label Imprint Films, part of ViaVision Entertainment, announced they had acquired the Australian rights to the catalog, and will begin releasing on their Imprint Asia line starting in 2026.
