= Raymond Wong Pak-ming =

Hong Kong film producer (born 1948)

Raymond Wong Pak-ming MH
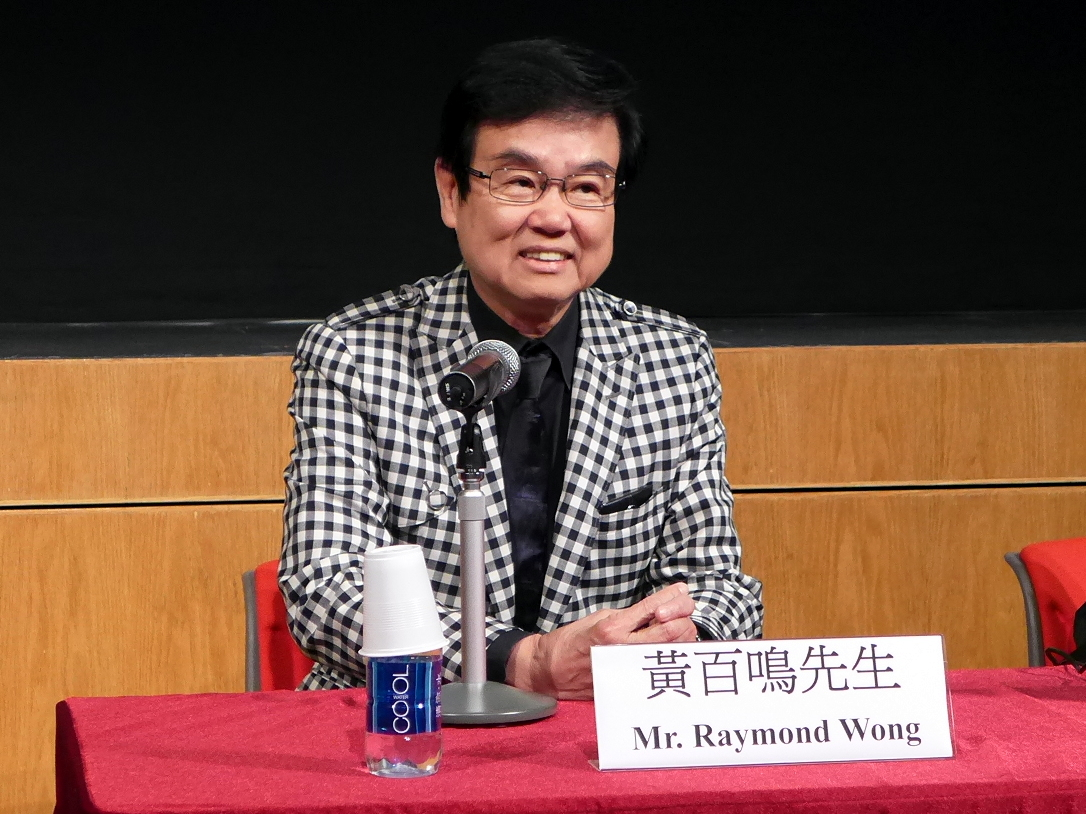
- Wong in 2016
- Born: 8 April 1946 (age 80); Hong Kong
- Occupations: Film producer; playwright; adult film director; actor; entrepreneur
- Spouse: Wong Man-kuen (黃文娟) (m. 1970)
- Children: Two; Wong Tsz-wun (黃子桓); Wong Yee-kwan (黃漪鈞)
- Awards: Hong Kong Film Awards – Best Film; 2009 Ip Man

Chinese name
- Traditional Chinese: 黃百鳴
Transcriptions
Yue: Cantonese
- Jyutping: Wong4 Baak3ming4

Raymond Wong Pak-ming MH (Chinese: 黃百鳴; born 8 April 1946; sometimes transliterated as Raymond Wong Bak-ming) is a Hong Kong film producer, playwright, director and actor. He is one of the most successful producers in Hong Kong cinema, having been one of the comedians to establish Cinema City Studios in 1980.

== Media career ==
In 1980, Wong formed the renowned Cinema City Enterprises Ltd with Karl Maka and Dean Shek. The production company became an industry phenomenon, producing films such as A Better Tomorrow, Aces Go Places, Prison on Fire and All About Ah-Long. Actors such as Chow Yun-fat, Leslie Cheung and Ti Lung along with filmmakers John Woo, Ringo Lam and Tsui Hark were some of the people who rose to fame under the Cinema City label. He played the actor in the comedy ghost series Happy Ghost (開心鬼).

In 1991, the trio broke up, with both Maka and Shek ending their interests in the film industry.

Wong eventually formed Mandarin Films Distribution Co. Ltd. later that year, while continuing to establish himself as a successful film producer. Mandarin went on to produce films such as The Bride with White Hair, Dragon Tiger Gate, and Flash Point, with Wong often serving as an executive producer for the films produced. To this day, the company has produced over 100 films.

In 2009, Wong co-founded Pegasus Entertainment Holdings with his son Edmond.

In 2014, Wong lent his film Hello Babies at a fundraising event held by Silent Majority for Hong Kong, a political group which opposed the Occupy Central with Love and Peace movement.

On 22 May 2026, Wong was convicted of insider trading during his sale of his controlling stake in Pegasus Entertainment Holdings with his younger sister Jenny Wong buying the shares using his money. His sister made a profit of more than HK$1 million from the trading. On 9 June, Wong was sentenced to five months and fined HK$99,720. He was ordered to pay HK$374,305 to the Securities and Futures Commission for investigation costs additionally.

== Personal life ==
Wong is married to Wong Man-kuen (黃文娟).

== Filmography as actor ==
- Fun, Hong Kong Style (1974)
- For Whom to Be Murdered (1978) – Liu Man (Journalist)
- Strike of the Thunderkick Tiger (1978)
- Laughing Times (滑稽時代) (1981) – Man Eating Bananas
- Beware of Pickpocket (1981) – Dishonest Diner
- All the Wrong Clues (鬼馬智多星) (1981)
- Till Death Do We Scare (1982) – Stewart Pik
- Aces Go Places (最佳拍檔) (1982) – Priest
- Aces Go Places 2 (最佳拍檔大顯神通) (1983) – Priest
- Play Catch (1983)
- Kung Hai Fat Choy (1984)
- Happy Ghost (開心鬼) (1984) – Stewart Pik, the Happy Ghost
- The Tenant (靈氣迫人) (1984) – Hansom Wong
- Happy Ghost II (開心鬼放暑假) (1985) – Hong Sam-Kwai/Happy Ghost
- Cong & Me in Paradise (1985) – Cannon Wong
- True Colours (1986) – Robert
- Happy Ghost 3 (開心鬼撞鬼) (1986) – Hong Sam-Kwai/Happy Ghost
- Seven Years Itch (1987) – Willie Ng
- Goodbye Darling (呷醋大丈夫) (1987) – Dai Luk Mao
- The Eighth Happiness (八星報喜) (1988) – Mr. Fong
- All About Ah-Long (阿郎的故事) (1989) – Patrick
- How to be a Billionaire (1989) – Huang Shang
- Mr. Coconut (合家歡) (1989) – Wong Ka-Fan
- Celebrity Talk Show (1989) TV Series – Guest
- Happy Ghost IV (開心鬼救開心鬼) (1989) – Hong Sam-Kwai/Happy Ghost
- Sisters of the World Unite (1991)
- Great Pretenders (千王) (1991)
- The Banquet aka. Party of a Wealthy Family (豪門夜宴) (1991) – Forty
- Happy Ghost V (開心鬼5上錯身) (1991) – The Happy Ghost/Dog named Magic as a Human Being
- Daddy, Father and Papa (1991)
- All's Well, Ends Well (家有囍事) (1992) – Shang Moon
- Perfect Couples (1993)
- Insanity (1993) – John Wong
- All's Well, Ends Well Too (花田喜事) (1993) – Lam Ka-sing
- Laughter of the Water Margins (1993)
- It's a Wonderful Life (大富之家) (1994) – Kow-Foo Yum
- I Have a Date with Spring (我和春天有個約會) (1994) – Maitre d'
- Tristar (大三元) (1996) – Supt. Mai
- A Chinese Ghost Story: The Tsui Hark Animation (小倩) (1997) (voice: Cantonese version) – White Cloud
- All's Well, Ends Well 1997 (97家有囍事) (1997) – Lo Leung
- Troublesome Night 4 (陰陽路4之與鬼同行) (1998) – Mr. Wong
- Ninth Happiness (九星報喜) (1998)
- The Mirror(怪談之魔鏡) (1999) – The Ghost
- Fascination Amour (愛情夢幻號) (1999)
- Winner Takes All (大贏家) (2000)
- Wonder Women (2007)
- Dancing Lion (醒獅) (2007)
- Happy Funeral (2008)
- All's Well, Ends Well 2009 (家有囍事2009) (2009) – L
- All's Well, Ends Well 2010 (花田囍事2010) (2010)
- All's Well, Ends Well 2011 (最強囍事) (2011)
- Magic to Win (開心魔法) (2011)
- All's Well, Ends Well 2012 (八星抱喜) (2012)
- Love Is... Pyjamas (2012)
- Hotel Deluxe (百星酒店) (2013)
- Hello Babies (六福喜事) (2014)
- Golden Chicken 3 (金雞SSS) (2014)
- Kung Fu Angels (青春鬥) (2014)
- An Inspector Calls (浮華宴) (2015)
