= Filmography about Wong Fei-hung =

Films featuring Chinese martial artist

This is a list of films featuring the Chinese martial arts master and folk hero of Cantonese ethnicity, Wong Fei-hung. There are 123 in total. Where possible, alternative titles have been included, particularly the official English language titles or literal translations.

The most famous depictions of Wong Fei-hung in cinema include Jackie Chan in Drunken Master (1978) and Drunken Master II (1994), Jet Li in Once Upon a Time in China (1991) and Once Upon a Time in China II (1992), and Angie Tsang in Iron Monkey (1993). Tak-Hing Kwan starred in 79 films as Wong Fei-hung.

== 1940s ==
- Huang Fei-hong zhuan: Bian feng mie zhu (1949)

Played by Tak-Hing Kwan

- Huang Fei-hong chuan (1949)

Story of Huang Fei-hong (Hong Kong: English)

== 1950s ==
- The Beggar Named Su (1953)

Beggar So played by Lam Kau

- The Swordsman and the Beauty (1953)

Another film about Beggar So played by Lam Kau

- Revenge of the Beggar Named Su (1953)

Another film about Beggar So played by Lam Kau

- Huang Fei-hong yi guan cai hong qiao (1959)

Huang Fei-hong on Rainbow Bridge (Hong Kong: English)

- The White Lady's Reincarnation (1959)
- Huang Fei-hong hu peng fu hu (1959)

How Huang Fei-hong Defeated the Tiger on the Opera Stage (Hong Kong: English)

- Huang Fei-hong bei kun hei di yu (1959)

How Huang Fei-hong Was Trapped in the Dark Inferno (Hong Kong: English)
Wong Fei Hung Trapped in Hell

- Huang Fei-hong lei tai dou san hu (1958)

Huang Fei-hong's Battle with the Bullies in the Boxing Ring (Hong Kong: English)

- Huang Fei-hong long zheng hou dou (1958)

Huang Fei-hong's Greatest Fight (Hong Kong: English)

- Huang Fei-hong da nao feng huang gang (1958)

How Huang Fei-hong Stormed Phoenix Hill (Hong Kong: English)

- Huang Fei-hong da po jin zhao zhang (1958)

How Huang Fei-hong Erased the Golden Bell Trap (Hong Kong: English)

- Huang Fei-hong da po Ma gu zhuang (1958)

Huang Fei-hong's Victory at Ma Village (Hong Kong: English)

- Huang Fei-hong Saved the Bride at Xiguan (1958)
- How Huang Fei-hong and His Wife Conquered the Three Rascals (1958)
- Huang Fei-hong tie ji dou shen ying (1958)

How Huang Fei-hong Used an Iron Fowl Against the Eagle (Hong Kong: English)

- How Huang Fei-hong Saved Liang Kuan in the Tiger's Cave (1958)

Wong Fei Hung Saves the Kidnapped Liang Kuan

- How Huang Fei-hong Conquered the Two Dragons with the Five Snakes (1958)
- Huang Fei-hong xie jian su po wu (1957)

How Huang Fei-hong Fought a Bloody Battle in the Spinster's Home (Hong Kong: English)

- Huang Fei-hong ye tan hei long shan (1957)

How Huang Fei-hong Spied on Black Dragon Hill at Night (Hong Kong: English)

- Huang Fei-hong er long zheng zhu (1957)

Huang Fei-hong: Duel of the Two Dragons for the Pearl (Hong Kong: English)

- Huang Fei-hong da po fei dao dang (1957)

How Huang Fei-hong Smashed the Flying Dagger Gang (Hong Kong: English)

- Huang Fei-hong die xie ma an shan (1957)

Huang Fei-hong and the Battle of Saddle Hill (Hong Kong: English)

- Huang Fei-hong Henan yu xie zhan (1957)

Huang Fei-hong's Fight at Henan (Hong Kong: English)

- Wong Fei-hung's Battle at Mount Goddess of Mercy (1956)
- Huang Fei-hong hua ting feng yun (1956)

Huang Fei-hong and the Courtesan's Boat Argument (Hong Kong: English)

- Huang Fei-hong heng sao Xiao Beijiang (1956)

Huang Fei-hong's Victory at Xiao-Beijiang (Hong Kong: English)

- Huang Fei-hong fu er hu (1956)

How Huang Fei-hong Conquered the Two Tigers (Hong Kong: English)

- Huang Fei-hong da nao Foshan (1956)

Huang Fei-hong's Fight at Foshan (Hong Kong: English)

- Huang Fei-hong da nao hua deng (1956)

Huang Fei-hong and the Lantern Festival Disturbance (Hong Kong: English)

- Huang Fei-hong da zhan Shuangmendi (1956)

Huang Fei-hong's Battle at Shuangmen-di (Hong Kong: English)

- Huang Fei-hong du bei dou wu long (1956)

How Huang Fei-hong Fought 5 Dragons Single-handed (Hong Kong: English)

- Huang Fei-hong gong chuan jian ba (1956)

How Huang Fei-hong Vanquished the Bully at the Red Opera Float (Hong Kong: English)

- Huang Fei-hong Guanshan da he shou (1956)

Huang Fei-hong Goes to a Birthday Party at Guanshan (Hong Kong: English)

- Huang Fei-hong gu si jiu qing seng (1956)

How Huang Fei-hong Saved the Lovelorn Monk from the Ancient Monastery (Hong Kong: English)

- Huang Fei-hong lei tai bi wu (1956)

Huang Fei-hong at a Boxing Match (Hong Kong: English)

- Huang Fei-hong huo shao Daoshatou (1956)

How Huang Fei-hong Set Fire to Da-sha-tou (Hong Kong: English)

- Huang Fei-hong long zhou duo jin (1956)

Huang Fei-hong Wins the Dragon-Boat Race (Hong Kong: English)

- Huang Fei-hong nu tun shi er shi (1956)

How Huang Fei-hong Vanquished the Twelve Tigers (Hong Kong: English)
How Wong Fei-hung Vanquished Twelve Lions

- Huang Fei-hong qi dou huo qi lin (1956)

Huang Fei-hong's Seven Battles with the Fiery Unicorn (Hong Kong: English)

- Huang Fei-hong qi shi hui jin long (1956)

How Huang Fei-hong Pitted 7 Lions Against the Dragon (Hong Kong: English)
How Wong Fei-hung Pitted Seven Lions against the Gold Dragon

- Huang Fei-hong san hu nu biao shi (1956)

How Huang Fei-hong Thrice Tricked the Girl Bodyguard (Hong Kong: English)
How Wong Fei-hung Thrice Tricked the Lady Security Escort

- Huang Fei-hong Shamian fu shen quan (1956)

How Huang Fei-hong Vanquished the Terrible Hound at Shamian (Hong Kong: English)
How Wong Fei-hung Vanquished the Ferocious Dog in Shamian

- Huang Fei-hong tian hou miao jin xiang (1956)

Huang Fei-hong Attends the Joss-Stick Festival at Heavenly Goddess Temple (Hong Kong: English)
Wong Fei-hung's Pilgrimage to Goddess of Sea Temple

- Huang Fei-hong shui di san qin Su Shulian (1956)

How Huang Fei-hong Thrice Captured Su Shulian in the Water (Hong Kong: English)

- Huang Fei-hong xing juan hui qi lin (1956)

How Huang Fei-hong Pitted a Lion Against the Unicorn (Hong Kong: English)

- Huang Fei-hong tie ji dou wu gong (1956)

Huang Fei-hong: The Iron Rooster Versus the Centipede (Hong Kong: English)

- Huang Fei-hong yi jiu long mu miao (1956)

How Huang Fei-hong Saved the Dragon's Mother's Temple (Hong Kong: English)

- Huang Fei-hong yi jiu mai yu can (1956)

Huang Fei-hong Rescues the Fishmonger (Hong Kong: English)

- The True Story of Wong Fei-hung (1955)
- Huang Fei-hong wen zhen si pai lou (1955)

Huang Fei-hong's Victory at Fourth Gate (Hong Kong: English)

- Huang Fei-hong Huadi chuang po (1955)

Huang Fei-hong Vied for the Firecrackers at Huadi (Hong Kong: English)

- Huang Fei-hong chang ti jian ba (1955)

Huang Fei-hong Vanquished the Bully at Long Dike (Hong Kong: English)

- Huang Fei-hong yu Lin Shi-rong (1955)
- Huang Fei-hong chu shi wu ying jiao (1954)

Huang Fei-hong Tries His Shadowless Kick (Hong Kong: English)

- Huang Fei-hong yi gun fu san ba (1953)

How Huang Fei-hong Defeated Three Bullies with a Single Rod (Hong Kong: English)

- Huang Feihong yu jiu Haichuang si shang ji (1953)

How Huang Fei-hong Redeemed Haitong Monastery Part 1 (Hong Kong: English)

- Huang Feihong yu jiu Haichuang si xia ji (1953)

How Huang Fei-hong Redeemed Haitong Monastery Part 2 (Hong Kong: English)

- Huang Fei-hong xie ran Furong gu (1952)

Huang Fei-hong's Blood Battle in Furong Valley (Hong Kong: English)

- Huang Fei-hong chuan da jie ju (1951)
- Huang Fei-hong chuan di san ji xie zhan Liuhua qiao (1950)

Huang Fei-hong's Battle at Liu-hua Bridge (Hong Kong: English)

== 1960s ==
- Huang Fei-hong hu de dou wu lang (1969)

Huang Fei-hong's Combat with the Five Wolves

- Huang Fei-hong qiao duo sha yu qing (1969)

Huang Fei-hong: The Duel for the 'Sha-yu-qing'

- Huang Fei-hong: The Conqueror of the "Sam-hong Gang" (1969)
- Huang Fei-hong yu xie liu huang gu (1969)

Huang Fei-hong in Sulphur Valley

- Huang Fei-hong zui da ba jin gang (1968)

Huang Fei-hong: The Eight Bandits

- Huang Fei-hong quan wang zheng ba (1968)

Huang Fei-hong: Duel for the Championship

- Huang Fei-hong rou bo hei ba wang (1968)

Huang Fei-hong: The Duel Against the Black Rascal

- Huang Fei-hong xing shi du ba mei hua zhuang (1968)

Huang Fei-hong: The Invincible 'Lion Dancer'

- Huang Fei-hong wei zhen wu yang cheng (1968)

Huang Fei-hong: The Incredible Success in Canton

- Huang Fei-hong hu zhao hui qan ying (1967)

Huang Fei-hong Meeting the Heroes with the Tiger Paw (Hong Kong: English)

- Huang Fei-hong yuan da po wu hu zhen (1961)

How Huang Fei-hong Smashed the 5 Tigers (Hong Kong: English)

- Huang Fei-hong lei tai zheng ba zhan (1960)

Huang Fei-hong's Combat in the Boxing Ring (Hong Kong: English)

- Wong Fei Hung's Battle with the Gorilla (1960)

== 1970s ==
- Huang Fei-hong yong po lie huo zhen (1970)

Huang Fei-hong: Bravely Crushing the Fire Formation (Hong Kong: English)

- Huang Fei Hong (1973)

Death Kick
The Master of Kung-Fu
Wong Fei Hung (Hong Kong: Cantonese)

- Huang Fei-hong xiao lin quan (1974)

The Skyhawk

- Huang Fei Hong yi qu ding cai di (1974)

Rivals of Kung Fu (International: English)
Wong Fei Hung yee chui ding choi dei (Hong Kong: Cantonese)

- Challenge of the Masters (1976)

Huang Fei-hong yu liu a cai
Liu A Cai yu Huang Fei Hong (Hong Kong: Cantonese)

- Huang fei hong si da di zi (1977)

The Four Shaolin Challengers (International: English)
Wong Fei Hung sei daai dai ji (Hong Kong: Cantonese)

- Ten Tigers of Shaolin (1978)
- Heroes of the East (1978)

Cameo appearance of So Chan played by Lau Kar-leung

- Jui kuen (1978)

Drunken Master
Challenge (India: English)
Drunken Fist (Hong Kong: English) (literal)
Drunken Monkey in the Tiger's Eyes
Eagle Claw, Snake Fist, Cat's Paw, Part 2
The Drunken Master (Philippines: English)
Zui quan (Hong Kong: Mandarin)

- Dance of the Drunk Mantis (1979)

Another sequel to Drunken Master and therefore spinoff related to Beggar So.

- Story of Drunken Master (1979)

Origin story about Beggar So
Played by Yuen Siu-tien

- World of the Drunken Master (1979)

Another film about Beggar So played by Yuen Siu-tien, with Lee Yi-min and Yu Chung-chiu portraying young and old versions

- Ten Tigers from Kwangtung (1979)

Another film about the Ten Tigers of Canton

- Lin shi rong (1979)

Magnificent Butcher
Butcher Wing
Ren zhe wu di

== 1980s ==
- Huang Fei Hong yu gui jiao qi (1980)

The Magnificent Kick a.k.a. Kick Without a Shadow

- Martial Club (1981)

Wu guan
Instructors of Death

- Yong zhe wu ju (1981)

Dreadnaught
Yung che miu gui (Hong Kong: Cantonese)

- The Legend of Master So (1982 TVB series)

TV series about So Chan
Played by Chow Yun-fat

- The Return of Wong Fei Hung (1984 TVB series)

Despite the title of the film, Porky Wing (played by Andy Lau) is the main character and protagonist in the TV series.
Played by Lau Kong

- Young Vagabond (1985)

So Chan
Played by Gordon Liu

- Foo gwai lit che (1986)

Fu gui lie che (China: Mandarin)
Millionaire's Express
Nobles' Express
Wealthy Train (literal English)

- Long xing tian xia (1989)

The Master
Wong fei hung

== 1990s ==
- Wong Fei Hung (1991)

Huang Fei-hong Hong Kong (Mandarin)
Once Upon a Time in China played by Jet Li

- Wong Fei Hung Returns (1992 series)

Starring Dicky Cheung

- King of Beggars (1992)

Beggar So
Played by Stephen Chow

- Huang Fei Hong xiao zhuan (1992)

Once Upon a Time a Hero in China played by Alan Tam

- Huang Fei-hong xi lie zhi yi dai shi (1992)

Great Hero from China (Hong Kong: English)
Martial Arts Master Wong Fei Hung
Wong Fei Hong '92

- Wong Fei Hung ji yi: Naam yi dong ji keung (1992)

Huang Fei-hong zhi er nan er dang zi qiang Hong Kong (Mandarin)
Once Upon a Time in China II
Played by Jet Li
The period of tomorrow never died in the memories of the establishment of the Republic of China all thanks to the Kuomintang founded by Sun Yat-sen along with the Tongmenghui created by his friend Lu Haodong who was killed by gunfire from the Qing soldiers in 1895.

- Master Wong vs. Master Wong (1993)
- Fist from Shaolin (1993)
- Huang Fei Hong zhi nan er dang bao guo (1993)

Fist from Shaolin

- Huang Fei Hong dui Huang Fei Hong (1993)

Master Wong vs. Master Wong
Once Upon a Time a Hero in China II

- Huang Fei-Hong zhi gui jiao qi (1993)

Ghost Foot 7
Kick Boxer
Once Upon a Chinese Hero (UK)
Seventh Ghostly Leg

- Wong Fei Hung ji saam: Si wong jaang ba (1993)

Huang Fei-hong zhi san shi wang zheng ba Hong Kong (Mandarin)
Once Upon a Time in China III
The Invincible Shaolin
Played by Jet Li

- Wong Fei-hung chi tit gai dau neung gung (1993)

Huang Fei-Hong zhi tie ji dou wu gong (Mandarin)
Last Hero in China
Claws of Steel (UK)
Deadly China Hero (US)
Iron Rooster vs. the Centipede
Tie ji dou wu gong
Wong Fei Hong's Iron Rooster vs. Centipede
Played by Jet Li

- Wong Fei-hung zhi sei: Wang zhe zhi feng (1993)

Once Upon a Time in China IV
The original character of Wong Fei-hung is now played by Vincent Zhao replacing Jet Li.
The period of tomorrow never died in the memories of the fall of the Qing dynasty and the battle of Beijing in 1900 all thanks to the Eight-Nation Alliance.

- Siu nin Wong Fei Hung ji Tit Ma Lau (1993)

Shao nian Huang Fei-Hong zhi tie ma liu (Mandarin)
Iron Monkey (US / UK)
Played by Angie Tsang
Iron Monkey: The Young Wong Fei Hong
Wong Fai Hong: The Formative Years (Hong Kong: English) (literal)

- Heroes Among Heroes (1993)

Fist of the Red Dragon (US)
This film is about Beggar So; whom turns his former friend, Prince Twelve into a drug addict and betrays him.
Played by Donnie Yen

- Wong Fei-hung zhi wu: Long cheng jian ba (1994)

Once Upon a Time in China V
Wong Fei-Hung V
Another sequel film from the Once Upon a Time in China franchise also starring Vincent Zhao as Wong Fei-hung replacing Jet Li.

- Jui kuen II (1994)

Drunken Fist II (literal English)
Drunken Master II
Legend of the Drunken Master (US)
Sui ken 2
The Legend of Drunken Master (US) (new title)
Zui quan II (China: Mandarin)

- Drunken Master III (1994)

Starring Andy Lau

- Wong Fei-hung and Thirteen Aunt (1994 series)

Taiwanese Wong Fei-hung TV series

- Master Wong (1994)

Master Wong from Malaysia (Cantonese)

- Once Upon a Time In China Series (1995–1996)
- Once Upon a Time In China Series: The Suspicious Temple (1995)

Starring Vincent Zhao

- Once Upon a Time In China Series: The Eight Assassins (1995)

Starring Vincent Zhao

- Once Upon A Time In China Series: The Headless General (1996)

Starring Vincent Zhao

- Once Upon a Time In China Series: The Ideal Century (1996)

Starring Vincent Zhao

- Once Upon a Time In China Series: The Final Victory (1996)

Starring Vincent Zhao

- Wong Fei-hung chi saiwik hung si (1997)

Huang Fei-hong zhi xi yu xiong shi Hong Kong (Mandarin)
Once Upon a Time in China VI
Once Upon a Time in China and America (1997)
Played by Jet Li
The very last sequel film from the Once Upon a Time in China franchise is about Wong Fei hung and his adventures in the wild west along with making new friends with cowboys and Native American Indians and the other Chinese settlers that have settled in the Americas for the gold rush.

- Ten Tigers Of Guangdong (1999 ATV series)

TV series about the Ten Tigers of Canton

== 2000s ==
- The Legend of Master Soh (2000 series)

Another TV series about So Chan
Played by Felix Wong

- The Young Wong Fei Hung (2002 series)
- Around the World in 80 Days (2004)

Played by Sammo Hung

- Kung Fu Beggar (2005 Series)

Another TV series about Beggar So
Played by Pu Ye Dong

- Wong Fei-hung and Thirteen Aunt (2005 series)
- Da Hua Huang Feihong (2005 Series)
- Wong Fei Hung – Master of Kung Fu (2005 TVB series)

Starring Bosco Wong

- Five Disciples of Master Wong (2006 series)
- Men Don't Cry (2007 TVB series)

Played by Dominic Lam

- Kungfu Master (direct-to-video anime, 2008)

Wong Fei Hong vs Kungfu Panda

- The Kung Fu Master Wong Fei Hung (2008 series)

Starring Dicky Cheung

== 2010s ==
- True Legend (2010)

Beggar So
Played by Vincent Zhao

- Grace Under Fire (2011 TVB series)

Played by David Chiang

- Huang Fei-hong: King of the Lions (2011)
- How Huang Fei-hong Rescued the Orphan from the Tiger's Den (2011)
- Badges of Fury (2013)

Played by Jet Li

- Rise of the Legend (2014)

Played by Peng Yuyan

- Master of the Drunken Fist: Beggar So (2016)

Beggar So
Played by Jun Cao

- Master of the Shadowless Kick: Wong Kei-ying (2017 TV movie)

Wong Kei-ying

- The Unity of Heroes (2018)

Huang Feihong
Played by Vincent Zhao

- The Unity of Heroes 2: Warriors of the Nation (2018)

Huang Feihong 2
Played by Vincent Zhao

- Wong Fei-Hung: Wrath of sea (2018)

Another film about Wong Fei-hung played by Vincent Zhao

- Kung Fu Alliance (2018)

Another film about Wong Fei-hong played by Vincent Zhao

- Kung Fu League (2018)

Another film about Wong Fei-hong played by Vincent Zhao

- Wong Fei-hung: Return Of The King (2018)

== See also ==
- Kwan Tak-hing
- List of film decologies and larger series
