= Yuen Siu-tien =

Chinese actor (1912–1979)

- 袁小田
- Born: 27 November 1912; Beijing, China
- Died: 8 January 1979 (aged 66); British Hong Kong
- Other names: Simon Yuen; Simon Yuen Siu-tien
- Occupation: Actor
- Years active: 1949–1979
- Children: 11, including: Yuen Woo-ping (son); Yuen Cheung-yan (son); Yuen Shun-yi (son)

Chinese name
- Simplified Chinese: 袁小田
- Traditional Chinese: 袁小田
- Hanyu Pinyin: Yuán Xiǎotián
Transcriptions
Standard Mandarin
- Hanyu Pinyin: Yuán Xiǎotián
- Wade–Giles: Yüan^{2} Hsiao^{3}-t’ien^{2}
Yue: Cantonese
- Jyutping: Jyun^{4} Siu^{2}-tin^{4}

Yuen Siu-tien (Chinese: 袁小田) (27 November 1912 – 8 January 1979) (also known as Yuan Xiaotian, Simon Yuen, Sam Seed or "Ol' Dirty") was a Hong Kong actor and martial artist. In the late 1970s, Yuen is perhaps best known as Beggar So (a.k.a. Sam Seed) in three films: Drunken Master, Story of Drunken Master and his final film Dance of the Drunk Mantis. He starred in several films with film actors like Jackie Chan and under the direction of his real-life son Yuen Woo-ping.

== Film career ==
Yuen trained in the traditional Peking opera role of wusheng. He began his film acting career at age 37, in the first Wong Fei-hung film to star Kwan Tak-hing, Story of Huang Feihong (1949), though his film appearances were rare until the late 1950s. He is best known for portraying mentors and kung fu masters in his films, and featured in almost 150 films throughout his career.

One of his internationally best-known films came late in his career, Drunken Master (1978), in which he played Beggar So (Sam Seed in some English dubs), an old hermit who had mastered the art of drunken boxing, aiding a young Wong Fei-hung, played by Jackie Chan. The role was a reprisal (in all but name) of the one he had played in another of Chan's films, Snake in the Eagle's Shadow (1978). At the time, Drunken Master proved to be the most successful film to feature Chan. The film portrayed Wong Fei-hung as a young and mischievous rascal as opposed to the venerable, Confucian master of kung fu played in many films by Kwan Tak-hing. The movie was a surprise international hit, and greatly helped to boost the career of the then 66-year-old actor. Yuen reprised the role of the beggar So for three further films, Dance of the Drunk Mantis, Story of Drunken Master, and World of the Drunken Master (in which he had a cameo appearance).

== Personal life ==
Yuen is the father of eleven children, six of whom assumed various professional roles in the Hong Kong film industry. The five eldest sons were known collectively as the "Yuen clan" and often worked in combinations on many films:

- Yuen Woo-ping - director and action director
- Yuen Cheung-yan - actor, director, stuntman and action director
- Yuen Shun-yi (Sunny Yuen) - actor, stuntman and action director
- Yuen Yat-chor - actor, stuntman, and action director
- Yuen Chun-yeung (Brandy Yuen) - actor, stuntman and action director
- Yuen Lung-chu - actor and stuntman

Yuen had two additional sons and three daughters.

== Death ==
On January 8, 1979, Yuen died of a heart attack. He was 66 years old. Yuen was considered for the role of Beggar So in the 1979 film Magnificent Butcher alongside Sammo Hung, but died as production of the film began. Yuen was replaced by Fan Mei-sheng (father of the Story of Ricky star Fan Siu-wong). Filming was continued with Fan's Drunken Master character, which necessitated reshooting some of Yuen's scenes. However, Fan's character is never referred to as "Beggar So" in this film.

== Legacy ==
- Yuen's likeness was used for the character Chin Gentsai in the SNK series The King of Fighters as well as for the character Shun Di from the Virtua Fighter series (taken from the role of Su Hai from Drunken Master).
- The rapper Ol' Dirty Bastard took his name from the title of Yuen's film Ol' Dirty & The Bastard.

== Filmography ==
=== Films ===
- An Old Kung Fu Master (1981) (a.k.a. Ol' Dirty & the Bastard)
- The Buddhist Fist (1980) - Sleeping monk
- Dance of the Drunk Mantis (1979) (a.k.a. Drunken Master II) - Beggar So / Sam Seed
- Jade Claw (1979) - Cook / Teacher
- Against Rascals with Kung-Fu (1979)
- Crystal Fist (1979)
- Mad Mad Kung Fu (1979) (a.k.a. Drunken Master Slippery Snake)
- Mean Drunken Master (1979)
- Horse Boxing Killer (1979) (a.k.a. Nu Shao Lin si) - Yan Shao Tien
- Blind Fist of Bruce (1979) - The Blind Master (as Simon Yuen)
- Sleeping Fist (1979)
- Drunken Arts and Crippled Fist (1979)
- Mystery of Chessboxing (1979) (a.k.a. Ninja Checkmate) - Master Yuen/Master Cook (Guest star)
- Story of Drunken Master (1979) (a.k.a. Drunken Fist Boxing) - Beggar So
- Drunken Master (1978) - Su Hua Chi / Beggar So / Sam Seed
- Peculiar Boxing Tricks and Master (1978) (a.k.a. Boxing Wizard)- Tung
- The 36th Chamber of Shaolin (1978) (a.k.a. The Master Killer; Mandarin title: Shao Lin san shi liu fang) - Teacher
- Snake in the Eagle's Shadow (1978) - Grandmaster Pai Cheng-Tien (as Hsiao-Tien Yuan)
- Heroes of the East (1978) - Tao's Teacher
- Boxing Wizard (1978) - Tung (as Yuan Hsiao-Tien)
- Deadly Snake Versus Kung Fu Killers (1977) - Snake Demon
- Bons baisers de Hong Kong (a.k.a. From Hong Kong with Love) (1975)
- Little Tiger of Canton (1971) (a.k.a. Master with Cracked Fingers) - Old Master (as Hsao Ten Juan)
- Come Drink with Me (1966) - Bandit
- The Flying Fox (1964) (a.k.a. The Purple Lightning Sword)
- 55 Days at Peking (1963) (uncredited)
- Story of the Sword and the Sabre (1963)
- The Story of the Great Heroes (1960–1961) (4 parts)
- The Book and the Sword (1960)
- Sword of Blood and Valour (1958/1959) - Mute
- Story of the Vulture Conqueror (1958/1959)
- Story of Huang Feihong (1949)

=== TV series ===
- The Legend of the Book and the Sword (1976)
