= Master with Cracked Fingers =

1979 Hong Kong film by Mu Chu

Master With Cracked Fingers
- Japanese DVD cover
- Directed by: Chu Mu
- Produced by: Lee Long Koan
- Starring: Jackie Chan; Siu Tien Yuen; Dean Shek
- Release date: 1979
- Running time: 80 minutes
- Country: Hong Kong
- Language: Cantonese
- Box office: 303,609 tickets (Europe)

Master with Cracked Fingers (Chinese: 刁手怪招; pinyin: diāo shǒu guài zhāo), also released as Snake Fist Fighter, is a 1979 Hong Kong martial arts film directed by Mu Chu and starring Jackie Chan. It is often cited as being produced in 1971, 1973, 1974 or 1981. The original footage was filmed in 1971 and released in 1973 as Little Tiger of Canton. The re-edited version entitled Master with Cracked Fingers was not actually released until 1979.

== Synopsis ==
The film has a similar theme to Drunken Master (1978). The dynamic and undisciplined Jackie (Jackie Chan) undergoes the tutelage of a nomadic master whose rigorous training style focuses upon the hardening of the fist.

Jackie has always been intrigued by kung fu, but he cannot afford to pay for lessons. He later meets a beggar, "The Man Who Isn't There", who offers to teach him the secrets of fighting. After years of training under his sifu, his skills advance, but his father forbids him to practice. After a series of fights with a local gang of extortionists, and progressively more severe punishments from his father, he fends off the gang once more. In retribution, the gang burn down his house, killing Jackie's father. To avenge his father's death, Jackie agrees to a blindfolded fight against the gang leader, (Kwan Yung-moon).

== Cast ==
=== Original footage ===
Cast	Role
Jackie Chan	Lung/Jackie (as Chan Yuan Lung / Cheng Lung)
Chan Hung Lit	Chow Bin
Tien Feng	Lung's father
Hon Kwok Choi	Pickpocket (Little Frog)
Yuen Biao	Extra

=== New footage ===
Cast	Role
Yuen Siu Tien	Old Master (as Hsao Ten Juan)
Dean Shek	Landlord (as Shih Tien)
Kwan Ying Moon	Big Boss (as Yung Man Kuen)

== Production ==
The film was concocted using footage from other films, primarily from a little-seen independent 1973 film entitled Little Tiger of Canton (aka The Cub Tiger From Kwang Tung) which featured a teenage Chan in one of his earliest roles. After Chan had become famous through films like Snake in the Eagle's Shadow and Drunken Master in the late 1970s, the footage was re-edited. Additional material from the Drunken Master era and new footage of Dean Shek and Yuen Siu Tien (in another appearance of his beggar character), was tacked on. A rather obvious Jackie Chan double was also hired and fought blind-folded in an attempt to hide the doubling from the viewers. Jackie Chan and Fu Yai Se were martial arts directors on the film.

== Release ==
Dick Randall took the amalgamated footage and employed actors to dub it into English, titling it Master with Cracked Fingers. Randall later sold the rights to 21st Century Distribution, who gave the film a limited release in American cinemas in 1981 under the alternative title Snake Fist Fighter.

As Chan became more popular in the West, particularly after the US release of Rumble in the Bronx (1996), the rights to release the film on VHS were passed or shared between a number of different film distributors.

=== VHS ===
In the US, it was released as Master with Cracked Fingers by Xenon (1996), and Woodhaven Entertainment (1999). Madacy released the film with the slightly different title Master with Cracked Finger (singular) in 1996, and later in a twin video pack along with Fantasy Mission Force (2000). As Snake Fist Fighter, the film was given two releases through Simitar Entertainment (1997), one in a twin video pack with New Fist of Fury. In the UK, it was released as Master with Cracked Fingers by Mia Video Entertainment (1998). It was also sold by Imperial Entertainment UK, in a triple video pack, along with City Hunter and Island of Fire.

=== DVD ===
All US DVD releases to date have had the title Master with Cracked Fingers. These began with a release from Woodhaven Entertainment in 2000. Others include Xenon (2002), Beverly Wilshire (2002), Unicorn Video (2003) and Miracle Pictures (2005). Madacy gave the film several releases (now as ...Fingers plural) including a twin DVD pack along with Fantasy Mission Force, and a triple pack DVD, which including both plus Rumble in Hong Kong (2000). They re-released it on its own in 2001. East West Entertainment released it in a twin DVD pack, along with The Young Master. Good Times Video released it in a twin DVD pack, along with the documentary film Fist of Fear, Touch of Death (2002). Unlike the other releases, Videoasia's 2004 DVD was a double-sided disc, with the US dubbed copy on one side, and the original Cantonese audio copy on the other. In the UK, it was released by Prism Leisure, alone (2002) and in at least two different four-film boxsets (2004). In 2007, the UK company Film 2000 released the film with the title Snake Fist Fighter.

Further companies also held the rights long enough to produce limited releases of the film on VHS and DVD and, as with those noted above, all were the English-dubbed 80 minute assembled version of the film.

=== Little Tiger of Canton ===
The original film, Little Tiger of Canton was finally given a DVD release in the west in 2007, under the title The Cub Tiger from Kwang Tung. It was released in the UK (region 2) on Showbox Home Entertainment's Rarescope label. This 85 minute film is in its un-tampered form, contains the original language and English subtitles. Due to the poor quality of the print, some of the subtitles are chopped from the foot of the screen, so the DVD contains an additional set of subtitles which appear whenever the originals are cropped or missing.

== Box office ==
The film received 1981 theatrical releases in France and Germany, selling 236,677 in France and 66,932 tickets in Germany, for a combined 303,609 ticket sales in Europe.

== See also ==
- Jackie Chan filmography
- List of Hong Kong films
- List of martial arts films
