= Kung Hei Fat Choy =

Kung Hei Fat Choy may refer to:

- A Cantonese phrase used during Chinese New Year, literally "congratulations and be prosperous"
- Kung Hei Fat Choy (film), a 1985 Hong Kong comedy film
