= Dean Shek =

Hong Kong film actor and producer (1949–2021)

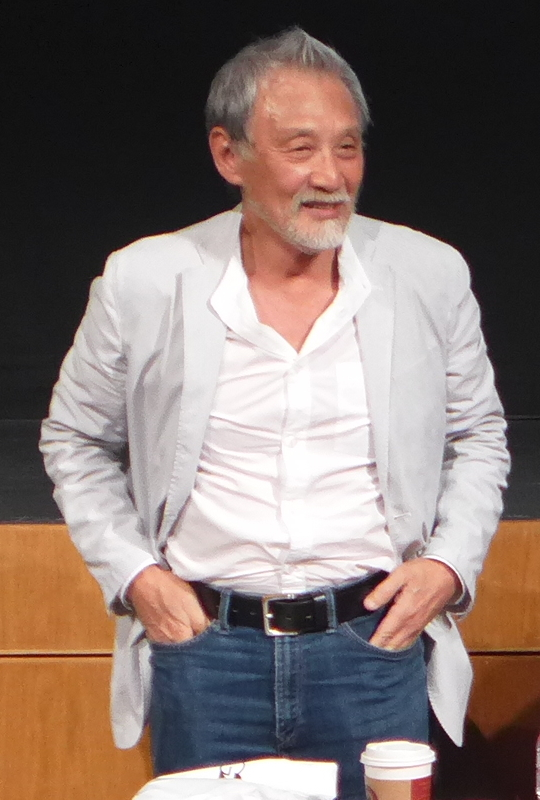
- Shek at The Wit and Wisdom of Cinema City event held at the Hong Kong Film Archive in 2016
- Born: Lau Wai-sing 劉偉成 (Traditional) 刘伟成 (Simplified); Liú Ｗěichéng (Mandarin); Lau4 Wai2sing4 (Cantonese); 17 June 1949; Beijing, China
- Died: 20 September 2021 (aged 72); Hong Kong
- Occupations: Actor, film producer, film director, screenwriter, film presenter
- Years active: 1968–1992, 2016–2021
- Spouse: Lau Chun-yue (1979–2021)

Chinese name
- Traditional Chinese: 石天
- Simplified Chinese: 石天
Transcriptions
Standard Mandarin
- Hanyu Pinyin: Shí Tiān
Yue: Cantonese
- Jyutping: Sek6 Tin1
- Musical career
- Also known as: Charlie Shek
- Origin: Hong Kong

Dean Shek (17 June 1949 – 20 September 2021), also known as Dean Shek Tin, was a Hong Kong film actor and producer with over 72 film credits to his name. Shek was perhaps best known as Professor Kai-hsien in the 1978 film Drunken Master, Lung Sei in the 1987 film A Better Tomorrow II, and Snooker in the 1990 film The Dragon from Russia.

== Early life ==
With ancestral roots from Tianjin, China, Shek was born as Lau Wai-sing on 17 June 1949, Beijing, before moving to Hong Kong at the age of 3. There, he attended the Shung Tak Catholic English College before studying filmmaking, acting and voice acting at Shaw Brothers Studio's actors training program in 1968.

== Career ==
=== Acting ===
Shek began his career as a contracted actor at Shaw Brothers Studio in 1968, making his first brief appearance in the film Twin Blades of Doom (1969). He received more substantial roles at Shaws, in musicals such as The Singing Killer, romantic films including A Time For Love (1970), comedies such as The Human Goddess (1972) and martial arts films such as The Fists of Vengeance (1972).

Shek left Shaw Brothers in 1973. The same year, he appeared in Master with Cracked Fingers, the first film to feature Jackie Chan in a starring role. He made his directorial debut in 1975 with The Monk, and worked as assistant director on Black Alice (1975), A Queen's Ransom (1976), Iron Fisted Monk (1977).

Throughout the late 1970s, Shek continued to work with the likes of Jackie Chan and Sammo Hung on period kung fu films including Broken Oath (1977), Warriors Two (1978), Snake in the Eagle's Shadow (1978), Drunken Master (1978), Odd Couple (1979) and Dance of the Drunk Mantis (1979).

Shek is credited as producer on 22 films, most of which were for the production company Cinema City & Films Co., which he co founded with Karl Maka and Raymond Wong in 1980. Throughout the 1980s, he appeared in action, crime and comedy films such as Aces Go Places and John Woo's A Better Tomorrow 2 (1987). He also directed four films during the period, which were The Perfect Wife?! (1983), A Family Affair (1984), Kung Hei Fat Choy (1985) and The Family Strikes Back (1986), which were all box office hits.

=== Final film and retirement from acting ===
Shek played his final role as Uncle Choi in the 1991 action film, The Raid.

In 1992, Shek retired from acting at the age of 42, after working as a producer in 1992 fantasy horror film, Angel Hunter.

Recently, Shek made a return to acting with a cameo appearance in the 2016 film, The Bodyguard, which is directed by and starring Sammo Hung, and also produced by and guest starring Andy Lau.

Shek last made his public appearance with his former Cinema City & Films Co. collaborators at the 36th Hong Kong Film Awards.

== Personal life ==
In 1979, Shek married Taiwanese actress Lau Chun-yue. They had several children together. Shek's three main personal hobbies were cigar, golf and coffee.

After retiring from the film industry, Shek ventured into and found success in the real estate industry.

Shek died from cancer on 20 September 2021, at the age of 72. He had been diagnosed with the disease two months prior.

== Filmography ==
=== Films ===
| Year | Title | Chinese Title | Role | Notes |
|---|---|---|---|---|
| 1968 | Killer Darts | 追魂鏢 | "Tung Kung-long" | |
| 1969 | Twin Blades of Doom | 陰陽刀 | "Mayor's servant" | |
| 1969 | Dark Semester | 桃李春風 | "Yu Mei-hsiu" | |
| 1970 | Young Lovers | 青春戀 | "Lin Da-cheng" | |
| 1970 | A Time for Love | 那個不多情 | "John Chau" | |
| 1970 | The Singing Killer | 小煞星 | "Fairy" | |
| 1970 | My Son | 春火 | "Rape gang member" | |
| 1970 | Guess Who Killed by Twelve Lovers | 噴火美人魚 | "Stephen" | |
| 1971 | It Takes a Man to Be Henpecked | 怕老婆是大丈夫 | Actor | |
| 1971 | The Man with Two Wives | 齊人樂 | Actor | |
| 1971 | Master with Cracked Fingers | 刁手怪招 | "Landlord" | Re-edit of Little Tiger of Canton |
| 1972 | Pursuit | 林沖夜奔 | "Palace guard" | |
| 1972 | Intrigue in Nylons | 少奶奶的絲襪 | "Shop clerk" | |
| 1972 | The Human Goddess | 凡下女仙 | "Playboy #1" | |
| 1972 | The Fugitive | 亡命徒 | "Siu Ba" | |
| 1972 | The Fists of Vengeance | 落葉飛刀 | "Doggie" | a.k.a. The Deadly Knives a.k.a. A Life-and-Death Struggle |
| 1972 | The Black Tavern | 黑店 | "Wandering Monk" | |
| 1972 | Let's Go to Bed | 我們要洞房 | Actor | |
| 1973 | The Young Tiger | 小老虎 | "Conceited Red Shirt" | |
| 1973 | Tales of Larceny | 牛鬼蛇神 | "Yu Jieh" | Two-part anthology film with Shek appearing in the first part. |
| 1973 | The Pirate | 大海盜 | "Master Bai" | |
| 1973 | The Iron Bodyguard | 大刀王五 | "Liang Qi-chao" | a.k.a. The Knight and the Scholar |
| 1973 | Illicit Desire | 風流韻事 | "Little Fairy" | Three-part anthology film with Shek appearing in the third part. |
| 1973 | The Generation Gap | 叛逆 | "Club bald waiter" | a.k.a. The Traitor |
| 1973 | The Delinquent | 憤怒少年 | "Cripple" | a.k.a. Street Gangs of Hong Kong |
| 1973 | My Wife, My Love and My Maid | 一嬌二俏三更妙 | | |
| 1973 | Ambush | 埋伏 | "Cold-faced swordsman Hong Lieh" | |
| 1973 | The Villains | 土匪 | "Li Deng-yao" | |
| 1974 | Young Lovers on Flying Wheels | 電單車 | "Xiao Xian" | |
| 1974 | Naughty! Naughty! | 綽頭狀元 | "Auntie Six's husband" | |
| 1974 | A Mad World of Fools | 怪人怪事 | Actor | |
| 1974 | The Golden Lotus | 金瓶雙豔 | "Doctor Jiang" | |
| 1974 | Games Gamblers Play | 鬼馬雙星 | "Casino clerk" | |
| 1974 | Blood Reincarnation | 陰陽界 | "Chang" | |
| 1974 | The Big Risk | 虎鬥虎 | Actor | a.k.a. Kung Fu Conspiracy a.k.a. When Tough Guys Meet |
| 1974 | Tenants of Talkative Street | 街知巷聞 | Actor | |
| 1974 | Paris Killers | 巴黎殺手 | "Shot messenger" | |
| 1974 | Everyday Is Sunday | 天天報喜 | Actor | |
| 1974 | Bravest Fist | 一山五虎 | Actor | |
| 1974 | Call Me Dragon | 神龍小虎闖江湖 | "Mincing waiter" | a.k.a. Fighting Dragon vs. Deadly Tiger |
| 1974 | April Fool | 出乎意料 | Actor; Screenwriter | |
| 1974 | The Protectors | 鏢旗飛揚 | "Spear Prince" | |
| 1975 | The Monk | 出家人 | "Si-hung"; Director; Screenwriter | Directorial debut a.k.a. The Kung Fu Monk |
| 1975 | Kissed by the Wolves | 狼吻 | Actor | |
| 1975 | The Young Dragons | 鐵漢柔情 | "Young brothel customer" | |
| 1975 | Shantung Man in Hong Kong | 小山東到香港 | Actor | a.k.a. Little Shantung Arrives in Hong Kong |
| 1975 | The Seven Coffins | 驅魔女 | Actor | |
| 1975 | The Last Message | 天才與白痴 | "Hotel clerk" | |
| 1975 | My Wacky, Wacky World | 大千世界 | "Te Shun" | |
| 1975 | Lady of the Law | 女捕快 | "Young Master Chen" | |
| 1975 | Hong Kong Superman | 香港超人 | Actor; Assistant director | a.k.a. Bruce, Hong Kong Master |
| 1975 | Chinese Superior Kung Fu | 中國神打 | Actor | |
| 1975 | The Bedevilled | 心魔 | "Lin Chi-yao" | |
| 1975 | Bald-Headed Betty | 光頭蓓蒂 | Actor | |
| 1975 | All in the Family | 花飛滿城春 | Actor | |
| 1975 | Black Alice | 盲女奇緣 | Assistant director | |
| 1976 | A Queen's Ransom | 鱷潭群英會 | "Ducky"; Assistant director Assistant producer | |
| 1976 | My Funny Intern | 鬼馬俏醫生 | Actor | a.k.a. Hour of the Wolf a.k.a. Typical Admirable Doctor |
| 1976 | I Want More... | 官人我要 ... | Actor | a.k.a. Confession of a Concubine a.k.a. Injustice! My Lord |
| 1976 | The Girlie Bar | 酒帘 | "Xiao Kang" | a.k.a. The Finger Bar |
| 1976 | The Simple-Minded Fellow | 大懵成 | Actor | |
| 1976 | Divorce Hong Kong Style | 香港式離婚 | Actor | |
| 1976 | Gonna Get You | 溫拿與教授 | Planning | |
| 1977 | Mantis Fists and Tiger Claws of Shaolin | 血海螳螂仇 | Hung Chun-piao | |
| 1977 | The Iron-Fisted Monk | 三德和尚與舂米六 | "Manchu"; Assistant director | |
| 1977 | Broken Oath | 破戒 | "Brothel manager" | |
| 1977 | The Discharged | 出冊 | "Toast waiter" (cameo) | |
| 1977 | Winner Takes All! | 面懵心精 | Actor | |
| 1978 | Warriors Two | 贊先生與找錢華 | "Master Yao" | |
| 1978 | Spiritual Kung Fu | 拳精 | "Shaolin student" | |
| 1978 | Snake in the Eagle's Shadow | 蛇形刁手 | "Teacher Li" | |
| 1978 | Snake Crane Secret | 蛇鶴丹心震九州 | "Shao Ting-shan" | a.k.a. Secrets of the Dragon a.k.a. Snake & Crane Secrets |
| 1978 | Half a Loaf of Kung Fu | 一招半式闖江湖 | "Man with cane" | a.k.a. Karate Bomber |
| 1978 | Filthy Guy | 臭頭小子 | Actor | a.k.a. Return of the Secret Rivals a.k.a. Emperor of Filthy Guy |
| 1978 | Drunken Master | 醉拳 | "Professor Kai-shien" | a.k.a. Drunk Monkey in the Tiger's Eye |
| 1978 | Dirty Tiger, Crazy Frog | 老虎田雞 | "Panther" | |
| 1978 | Deadly Strike | 最佳搏殺 | "Cheung Tsai" | a.k.a. Breakout from Oppression |
| 1978 | Dirty Kung Fu | 鬼馬功夫 | "Criminal who sells women" | a.k.a. Kung Fu Expert |
| 1978 | 18 Fatal Strikes | 十八羅漢拳 | "Tai-pan" | a.k.a. 18 Deadly Strikes |
| 1978 | My Life's on the Line | 賭命走天涯 | "Master Handsome" | a.k.a. 60 Second Assassin |
| 1978 | The Adventure of the Heaven Mouse | 通天老鼠下江南 | Actor | a.k.a. Force 3 From Shanghai a.k.a. Snake in the Crane's Shadow |
| 1978 | Crazy Guy with Super Kung Fu | 戇頭呆佬笨徒弟 | Actor | |
| 1979 | Story of Drunken Master | 醉俠蘇乞兒 | "Little Master" (cameo) | |
| 1979 | Love and Sword | 要命的小方 | Actor | a.k.a. The Samurai |
| 1979 | Odd Couple | 搏命單刀奪命槍 | "Master Rocking" | a.k.a. Shaolin Sabre vs Wu Tang Spear |
| 1979 | Kung Fu on Sale | 功夫大拍賣 | "Kung fu instructor" | a.k.a. King of Money and Fists |
| 1979 | His Name Is Nobody | 無名小卒 | "Sting" | |
| 1979 | The Fearless Hyena | 笑拳怪招 | "Undertaker" (guest star) | |
| 1979 | Dance of the Drunk Mantis | 南北醉拳 | "Money Bags" | a.k.a. Drunken Master Part 2 |
| 1979 | Crazy Couple | 無招勝有招 | "Yan" | |
| 1979 | Four Invincibles | 四大跛拳 | Actor | |
| 1979 | Dance of Death | 舞拳 | "Bird Egg" | a.k.a. Eternal Conflict |
| 1980 | Ring of Death | 龍形摩橋 | "Chu" | a.k.a. Bastard Kung Fu Master |
| 1980 | Crazy Crooks | 瘋狂大老千 | "Mo-pei Chai"; Presenter | |
| 1980 | By Hook or by Crook | 鹹魚翻生 | "Skinny Gee" | |
| 1980 | Laughing Times | 滑稽時代 | "Chinese Charlie Chaplin" | |
| 1981 | Emperor of Shaolin Kung Fu | 闖王李自成 | Actor | a.k.a. Lord Chuang, Li Tzu-cheng a.k.a. The Snake, the Tiger, the Crane |
| 1981 | Chasing Girls | 追女仔 | "Robert" | |
| 1981 | Beware of Pickpockets | 歡樂神仙窩 | "Extra Hand" | |
| 1981 | Life After Life | 再生人 | Producer | |
| 1981 | All the Wrong Clues for the Right Solution | 鬼馬智多星 | Producer | a.k.a. All the Wrong Clues |
| 1981 | No U-Turn | 不准掉頭 | Producer | |
| 1981 | Spooky Kookies | 神檯貓 | Producer | |
| 1982 | It Takes Two | 難兄難弟 | "Shek"; Producer | |
| 1982 | Can't Stop the War | 大追擊 | "Soldier" (cameo); Producer | |
| 1982 | Aces Go Places | 最佳拍檔 | "Giglo Joe" (special appearance); Producer | |
| 1982 | Till Death Do We Scare | 小生怕怕 | Presenter | |
| 1982 | He Lives by Night | 夜驚魂 | Presenter | |
| 1983 | The Perfect Wife?! | 專撬牆腳 | "Dean Shek"; Director; Presenter | |
| 1983 | Fearless Hyena Part II | 龍騰虎躍 | "Shek Earth" (guest star) | |
| 1983 | All the Wrong Spies | 我愛夜來香 | "Japanese soldier in intro" (cameo); Presenter | |
| 1983 | Ghost Bustin' | 抓鬼特攻隊 | Presenter | |
| 1983 | Esprit D'armour | 陰陽錯 | Presenter | Re-edit of the 1970 film |
| 1983 | Aces Go Places 2 | 最佳拍檔大顯神通 | Presenter | |
| 1983 | Play Catch | 少爺威威 | Presenter | |
| 1983 | Papa, Can You Hear Me Sing? | 搭錯車 | Producer | |
| 1983 | Send in the Clowns | 台上台下 | Producer | |
| 1983 | Kidnapped | 等劍的小孩 | Producer | |
| 1983 | That Day on the Beach | 海灘的一天 | Production manager | |
| 1984 | A Family Affair | 全家福 | "Alex"; Director; Presenter | |
| 1984 | Banana Cop | 英倫琵琶 | Presenter | |
| 1984 | Happy Ghost | 開心鬼 | Presenter | |
| 1984 | Lifeline Express | 鴻運當頭 | Presenter | |
| 1984 | Heaven Can Help | 上天救命 | Presenter | |
| 1984 | Merry Christmas | 聖誕快樂 | Presenter | |
| 1984 | Aces Go Places 3 | 最佳拍檔女皇密令 | Presenter | |
| 1984 | The Occupant | 靈氣逼人 | Presenter | |
| 1984 | Run, Tiger, Run | 兩隻老虎 | Producer; Presenter | |
| 1984 | Pom Pom | 神勇雙響炮 | Presenter | |
| 1984 | My Sentimental Little Friend | 多情種 | Presenter | a.k.a. My Little Sentimental Friend |
| 1984 | The Time You Need a Friend | 笑匠 | Presenter | |
| 1985 | Kung Hei Fat Choy | 恭喜發財 | "Mr. Fung"; Director; Producer; Presenter | |
| 1985 | City Hero | 飛虎奇兵 | "Trainer Lee" | |
| 1985 | Mummy Dearest | 四眼仔 | Presenter | |
| 1985 | For Your Heart Only | 為你鍾情 | Presenter | |
| 1985 | Why Me? | 何必有我 | Presenter | |
| 1985 | Happy Ghost II | 開心鬼放暑假 | Presenter | |
| 1985 | Cupid One | 愛神一號 | Presenter | |
| 1985 | The Isle of Fantasy | 開心樂園 | Presenter | |
| 1985 | Super Citizen | 超級市民 | Presenter | |
| 1985 | Lone, Lone Flower | 孤戀花 | Presenter | |
| 1985 | Happy Union | 天生一對 | Presenter | |
| 1985 | Happy Union 2 | 天生寶一對 | Presenter | |
| 1986 | The Family Strikes Back | 烏龍大家庭 | "Shek La-mai"; Director; Producer | |
| 1986 | Abracadabra | 天靈靈‧地靈靈 | Presenter | |
| 1986 | Happy Ghost III | 開心鬼撞鬼 | Presenter | |
| 1986 | Aces Go Places IV | 最佳拍檔千里救差婆 | Presenter | |
| 1986 | A Book of Heroes | 歡樂龍虎榜 | Presenter | |
| 1987 | A Better Tomorrow 2 | 英雄本色II | "Lung Sei" | |
| 1987 | Lady in Black | 奪命佳人 | Producer; Presenter | |
| 1988 | City War | 義膽紅唇 | Presenter | |
| 1988 | Fractured Follies | 長短腳之戀 | Producer | |
| 1989 | They Came to Rob Hong Kong | 八寶奇兵 | "Sherlock False"; Screenwriter; Presenter | |
| 1990 | The Dragon from Russia | 紅場飛龍 | "Snooker" (guest star); Producer; Presenter | |
| 1991 | The Raid | 財叔之橫掃千軍 | "Uncle Choi"; Presenter | |
| 1992 | Angel Hunter | 女校風雲之邪教入侵 | Producer; Presenter | |
| 2016 | The Bodyguard | 特工爺爺 | "Old man" (guest appearance) | Final film role |

=== Television series ===
| Year | Title | Chinese title | Role | Country and channel | Notes |
|---|---|---|---|---|---|
| 1976 | Saga of Sui & Tong Dynasty | 隋唐風雲 | "Lee Yuen-kat" | Hong Kong - CTV | |
| 1977 | Sword Stained with Royal Blood | 碧血劍 | "Ha Suet-yee" | Hong Kong - CTV | |
