= 60 Second Assassin =

60 Second Assassin may refer to:

- My Life's on the Line, known as 60 Second Assassin in the West, a 1978 Taiwanese martial arts film
- 60 Second Assassin (rapper), member of Sunz of Man
