= So Chan =

Chinese martial artist and folk hero

- Born: unknown Nanhai District, Foshan, Guangdong, Qing Empire
- Died: unknown unknown, Qing Empire
- Native name: 蘇燦
- Other names: So Fa-tsz (蘇花子); So Hut-yee (蘇乞兒)
- Style: Chinese martial arts Drunken boxing Brutal boxing
- Teacher: Chan Fook

Other information
- Notable students: So Hak-fu; Wong Fei-hung

Chinese name
- Traditional Chinese: 蘇燦
- Simplified Chinese: 苏灿
Transcriptions
Standard Mandarin
- Hanyu Pinyin: Sū Càn
Yue: Cantonese
- Jyutping: Sou1 Caan3

So Fa-tsz
- Traditional Chinese: 蘇花子
- Simplified Chinese: 苏花子
Transcriptions
Standard Mandarin
- Hanyu Pinyin: Sū Huāzǐ
Yue: Cantonese
- Jyutping: Sou1 Faa1 Zi2

So Hut-yee (nickname)
- Traditional Chinese: 蘇乞兒
- Simplified Chinese: 苏乞儿
- Literal meaning: Beggar So
Transcriptions
Standard Mandarin
- Hanyu Pinyin: Sū Qǐ'er
Yue: Cantonese
- Jyutping: Sou1 hat1 ji4-1

So Chan (Su Can), also known by his nickname Beggar So (So Fa-tsz or So Hut-yee), was a Chinese martial artist and folk hero who lived during the late Qing dynasty. One of the Ten Tigers of Canton, he was best known for his drunken boxing.

== Background ==
Born during the late Qing Dynasty, So Chan was from Nanhai District, Foshan, Guangdong, or Hunan according to one source, he was skilled in unarmed Chinese martial arts skills, Drunken Eight Immortals Boxing (醉八仙), Shaolin staff (少林棍棒) said to be taught by the Shaolin monk Chan Fook, and also brutal boxing (殘拳).

He formulated the unusual Golden Bowl and Iron Chopsticks technique (金碗鐵筷), which involved the use of an iron bowl on one hand to provoke the opponent and striking the opponent's acupuncture points with the iron chopsticks on another hand.

He was a wanderer and made a living performing martial arts and acrobatics with his younger sister in the streets of Guangdong. He also taught martial arts at Sancheng Community Training Centre (三聖社設教館) in Guangzhou and would later be known as one of the Ten Tigers of Canton. So exchanged ideas with So Hak-fu (蘇黑虎), a fellow martial artist of the Ten Tigers of Canton, and imparted the technique of Golden Bowl and Iron Chopsticks along with some of his drunken boxing skills to him. He also exchanged ideas with two other Ten Tigers martial artists Leung Kwan and Wong Kei-ying as well.

According to a folklore, So Chan also taught Wong Kei-ying's son Wong Fei-hung in drunken boxing.

It was assumed that So was believed to have died during the early reign of the Guangxu Emperor.

== In popular culture ==
=== Movies ===
He was first portrayed by Liu Chi-wai in at least six black-and-white Wong Fei-hung films starring Kwan Tak-hing from 1950 to 1961.

He was portrayed by Lam Kau in the 1953 black-and-white films The Beggar Named Su, The Swordsman And The Beauty, and Revenge of the Beggar Named Su.

He was portrayed by Yuen Siu-tien in the 1978 film Jui Kuen: The Drunken Master, and Yuen has often been associated with the character Beggar So ever since. However, Beggar So doesn't appear in its 1994 reboot Jui Kuen II: The Legend of Drunken Master.

He was portrayed by Kwok Choi-hon in the 1978 film Ten Tigers of Shaolin.

He was portrayed by Lau Kar-leung in the 1978 film Heroes of the East.

He was portrayed by Yuen Siu-tien again in the 1979 film Story of Drunken Master.

Yuen went on to reprise the role in the 1979 film Dance of the Drunk Mantis.

He was portrayed by Philip Kwok in the 1979 film Ten Tigers from Kwangtung.

Yuen Siu-tien reprised the role for the last time only as a cameo in the opening credits of the 1979 film World of the Drunken Master, with Lee Yi-min and Yu Chung-chiu portraying young and old versions of Beggar So respectively.

Yuen was supposed to reprise his role as So Chan in the 1979 film Magnificent Butcher, but he died on 8 January 1979 as production of the film was beginning. Fan Mei-sheng portrayed So Chan in that film.

He was portrayed by Gordon Liu in the 1985 film The Young Vagabond.

He was portrayed by Stephen Chow in the 1992 film King of Beggars.

He was portrayed by Donnie Yen in the 1993 film Heroes Among Heroes.

He was portrayed by Vincent Zhao in the 2010 film True Legend.

He was portrayed by Jun Cao in the 2016 film Master of the Drunken Fist: Beggar So.

He was portrayed by Chen Xinzhe in the 2020 film Kung Fu Master Su: Golden Pirate and its 2022 sequel Kung Fu Master Su: Red Lotus Worm.

=== Television ===
He was portrayed by Chow Yun-fat in the 1982 TVB television drama series The Legend of Master So.

He was portrayed by Cheng Pei-pei in the 1996 television series Wong Fei Hung Series: The Final Victory.

He was portrayed by Lam Chi-ho in the 1999 ATV television drama series Ten Tigers of Guangdong.

He was portrayed by Felix Wong in the 2000 television drama series The Legend of Master Soh.

He was portrayed by Pu Ye Dong in the 2005 television drama series Kung Fu Beggar.

He was portrayed by Wong Jing in the 2008 television drama series The Kung Fu Master Wong Fei Hung.

=== Opera ===
He was portrayed by an opera actor Zhang Xinyi of the Xiuqin Opera Troupe in the Chinese opera show Beggar So during the Kaohsiung Spring Art Festival 2016.

=== Video games ===
SNK's fighting game The King of Fighters '94 had a character debuting named Chin Gentsai (鎮 元斎) who is based on Beggar So.

The various sequels to the 1993 3D fighting game Virtua Fighter by Sega AM2, has a character named Shun Di (舜帝) who is also based on Beggar So.
