= Dance of the Drunk Mantis =

1979 Hong Kong film by Yuen Woo-ping

- Film poster
- Directed by: Yuen Woo-ping
- Written by: Ng See-yuen; Lung Hsiao
- Produced by: Ng See-yuen
- Starring: Yuen Siu-tien; Hwang Jang-lee; Linda Lin; Yuen Shun-yi; Charlie Shek; Yuen Kwai
- Cinematography: Cheung Hoi
- Edited by: Pan Hsiung; Allan Poon
- Music by: Chen Fei-chi
- Distributed by: Seasonal Film Corporation
- Release date: 27 June 1979
- Running time: 91 minutes
- Country: Hong Kong
- Language: Cantonese

Dance of the Drunk Mantis (Chinese: 南北醉拳) is a 1979 Hong Kong kung fu comedy film directed by Yuen Siu-tien's real life son Yuen Woo-ping and written by Ng See-yuen and Lung Hsiao. It stars Yuen Siu-tien, Hwang Jang-lee, Linda Lin, Yuen Shun-yi, Charlie Shek and Yuen Kwai. This was Yuen Siu-tien's final film appearance before his death on 8 January 1979. The film was released theatrically in Hong Kong on 27 June 1979.

== Plot ==
One year after training a young Freddy Wong (Jackie Chan) in Drunken Master, Beggar So / Sam Seed returns to find that his wife has adopted a son named Foggy. Sam takes a disliking to the boy and tortures him mentally and physically. Devastated, the boy runs away and takes a job at an inn, where he meets Rubber Legs and his student. He overhears that they are looking for Beggar So and want to kill him, making Rubber Legs' Northern 'Drunk Mantis' Boxing supreme.

However, Foggy returns home to warn Beggar So, who comes to the inn to meet Rubber Legs in a drinking feast. During the fight, Rubber Legs brings out his drunk mantis fist he combined with his Northern style against which Beggar So turns out to know no defense in particular, to bear, beating him easily. Beggar So gets mortally ill and sends Foggy to a sickness teacher for herbs to cure him, and the doctor teaches him a dreaded style called 'Sickness Boxing'. Now, armed with this sick form of fighting, Foggy is ready for Drunk Mantis. In the end, Foggy goes berserk and kills Rubber Legs. Unable to escape from his trance, he sees Rubber Legs when he looks at Beggar So and attacks him. The film closes with a freeze frame as Foggy leaps after his adopted father as the sickness doctor watches on.

== Cast ==
- Yuen Siu-tien – Beggar So / Sam Seed
- Hwang Jang-lee – Rubber Legs
- Linda Lin Ying – Beggar So's wife
- Yuen Shun-yi – Foggy
- Charlie Shek – Moneybags
- Yuen Kwai – Rubber Legs' student
- David Wu – Pickpocket
- Yen Shi-kwan – Sickness Master
- Brandy Yuen – Fake Sam Seed
- Sharon Noble – Various Women
- Chin Yuet Sang - Loan Shark (Cameo)

== See also ==
- Lists of Hong Kong films
- Filmography about Wong Fei-hung
