= Crazy Couple =

1979 Hong Kong film by Ricky Lau

- Film poster
- Traditional Chinese: 無招勝有招
- Simplified Chinese: 无招胜有招
- Hanyu Pinyin: Wú Zhāo Shèng Yǒu Zhāo
- Jyutping: Mou6 Ziu1 Sing3 Jau2 Ziu1
- Directed by: Ricky Lau
- Screenplay by: Raymond Wong
- Produced by: Guy Lai
- Starring: Dean Shek; Lau Ka-yung; Lily Li; Fung Hark-On; Huang Ha; Wong Ching; Eric Tsang; Peter Chan
- Cinematography: Yee Tung-lung
- Edited by: Tony Chow
- Production company: Filmway Pictures
- Release date: 30 December 1979
- Running time: 90 minutes
- Country: Hong Kong
- Language: Cantonese
- Box office: HK$1,638,491.30

Crazy Couple is a 1979 Hong Kong martial arts comedy film directed by Ricky Lau and starring Dean Shek and Lau Ka-yung.

== Plot ==
Street performer Cho brings his pet around to perform. He hopes to raise money to study martial arts. Retired martial arts master Chiu Chat-yeh has a mentally disabled daughter who is unattended and has Cho take care of her. Cho finds a girl from out of town named Piu-hung to take his spot as Chiu's daughter's caretaker and goes to study martial arts with the village's martial arts teacher, Kwan Yee-sai. Cho also befriends Kwan's son, Yan.

One day, a group of bandits come and terrorize the village and Chiu and Kwan team up to resist them. Chiu has stolen jewelry in his house which is unexpectedly stolen by Piu-hung. Chiu and Kwan are killed later as well. Cho and Yan flee to many places and seek a teacher to mentor them in martial arts. With continuous twists and turns along the way, they finally find the real culprit behind the scenes.

== Cast ==
- Dean Shek as Yan
- Lau Ka-yung as Cho
- Lily Li as Piu-hung
- Fung Hark-On as Mak Tai-lo
- Wong Ching as Chiu Yat-yeh
- Huang Ha as Yan and Cho's teacher
- Eric Tsang as Chiu's daughter
- Peter Chan as Kwan Yee-sai
- Ho Pak-kwong
- Mars
- Chik Ngai-hung
- Bruce Tong as Wong Lu-fu
- Danny Chow
- Wong Chi-keung
- Ho Kei-cheung
- Tam Po
- Ho Po-sing
- Chan Siu-kai
- Ho Chi-wah
- Wong Hak
- Fung Ming
- Cheung Chi-ping
- Ling Chi-hung

== Box office ==
The film grossed HK$1,638,491.30 at the Hong Kong box office during its theatrical run from 30 December 1979 to 8 January 1980.
