= Heroes Among Heroes =

1993 Hong Kong film by Yuen Woo-ping

- A DVD cover with the film's US title Fist of the Red Dragon
- Directed by: Yuen Woo-ping; Chan Chin-chung
- Screenplay by: Lau Tai-muk; Jobic Chui; Chan Chin-chung; Anthony Wong
- Produced by: Yuen Woo-ping; Chan Chin-chung; Lam Shue-kin
- Starring: Donnie Yen; Wong Yuk; Ng Man-tat; Fennie Yuen
- Cinematography: Stephen Poon; Ma Koon-wa
- Edited by: Kwok Ting-hung
- Music by: William Wu
- Production company: Art Sea Films
- Distributed by: Regal Films Distribution
- Release date: 11 November 1993
- Running time: 92 minutes
- Country: Hong Kong
- Language: Cantonese
- Box office: HK$7,020,771

Heroes Among Heroes
- Traditional Chinese: 蘇乞兒
- Simplified Chinese: 苏乞儿
- Literal meaning: "Beggar So"
Transcriptions
Standard Mandarin
- Hanyu Pinyin: Sǔ Qǐ Ěr
Yue: Cantonese
- Jyutping: So1 Hat1 Ji1

Heroes Among Heroes (Chinese: 蘇乞兒) is a 1993 Hong Kong martial arts film produced and directed by Yuen Woo-ping and starring Donnie Yen as the protagonist So Chan, who was one of the Ten Tigers of Canton. The film shows opium smugglers in the Qing Dynasty, China, with Officer Lin Zexu and Chinese martial arts master and folk hero of Cantonese ethnicity Wong Fei-hung fighting against them. It was released in the US as Fist of the Red Dragon.

== Plot ==
Close to the end of the Qing Dynasty, opium is being smuggled to China. Officer Lin Zexu (Pau Fong) and Master Wong Fei-hung (Wong Yuk) join forces against opium smugglers.

Meanwhile, So Chan, also known as Beggar So (Donnie Yen), a man from a rich family, is famous for stealing food for his poor foster father (Kwan Hoi-san) and friends. He lives with his father (Ng Man-tat) and aunt Jean (Sheila Chan). So befriends a British teacher named Yi-teh (Fennie Yuen), a niece of Prince Barac of Twelve (Hung Yan-yan).

So fights and defeats the Fire Lotus Gang, causing an explosion in which many citizens are hurt and Master Wong demands an apology. Later, Prince Barac of Twelve offers So opium; So becomes addicted to it. He goes to his foster father and learns drunken boxing; his foster father is then killed by the Fire Lotus Gang, for whom Prince Barac of Twelve has betrayed So.

So eventually returns home, joins forces with Wong Fei-hung, and seeks revenge. In the end, So and Wong win against Prince Barac of Twelve and Yi-teh becomes So's girlfriend. Lin Zexu and Wong Fei-hung watch as the opium is burned.

== Cast ==
- Donnie Yen as So Chan
- Fennie Yuen as Yi-teh
- Ng Man-tat as Chan's father
- Sheila Chan as Aunt Jean
- Wong Yuk as Wong Fei-hung
- Hung Yan-yan as Prince Barac of Twelve
- Kwan Hoi-san as foster-father
- Pau Fong as Lin Zexu
- Dickson Lee as Leung Foon

== Reception ==
The author Clive Davies praised the movie writing, "Some enjoyable action puts it on a par with the previous Yuen/Yen collaboration Iron Monkey." In a mostly negative review, Reno Gazette-Journal's Jennifer Merriman rated the film a D and wrote, "Donnie Yen (So Chan) was bright and charismatic in his part, but the rest of the characters were overdone and shrill. The fight scenes were good, fast and not too choreographed, but since I couldn't tell what was going on, they seemed overly random — like they just stuck one in every ten minutes whether it fit or not."

Paul Fonoroff of the South China Morning Post had a mixed review of the film, writing, "Actually, Heroes Among Heroes isn't inferior to the majority of period epics churned out since the Wong Fei-hung series was revived in 1991. The lead actors know their kung-fu, and the producers appear to have spared no expense by employing hundreds of extras, all in Qing costume. But because we've seen it all so many times before, Heroes Among Heroes seems as fresh as a rice box left in the refrigerator since the last Wong Fei-hung movie was released two months ago." Another South China Morning Post review said, "Alas, the fight choreography, traditionally one of Yuen's strengths, lacks the crispness of the veteran kung fu director's best work. Donnie Yan (so good in Once Upon a Time in China II) lacks charisma when he needs to emote for longer than he fights, and Wong Kwok is charmless as Wong Fei-hung."

== See also ==
- Donnie Yen filmography
- Wong Fei-hung filmography
