= It's a Wonderful Life (1994 film) =

1994 Hong Kong film by Clifton Ko

- Film poster
- Traditional Chinese: 大富之家
- Simplified Chinese: 大富之家
- Hanyu Pinyin: Dà Fù Zhī Jiā
- Jyutping: Daai6 Fu2 Zi1 Gaa1
- Directed by: Clifton Ko
- Written by: Raymond To
- Produced by: Raymond Wong
- Starring: Leslie Cheung; Tony Leung; Raymond Wong; Lau Ching-wan; Teresa Mo; Anita Yuen; Fung Bo Bo; Carol Cheng; Kwan Tak-hing; Lee Heung-kam; Cho Tat-wah
- Cinematography: Sander Lee; Lee Kin-keung
- Edited by: Kam Ma
- Music by: John Wong
- Production company: Mandarin Films
- Release date: 6 February 1994
- Running time: 94 minutes
- Country: Hong Kong
- Language: Cantonese
- Box office: HK$37,367,669

It's a Wonderful Life (大富之家 Daai foo ji ga, literally House of Rich) is a 1994 Hong Kong comedy film directed by Clifton Ko, featuring an ensemble cast.

== Cast ==
- Leslie Cheung as Roberto
- Tony Leung Ka-fai as Tam Kau-kwai
- Teresa Mo as Tam Kau-an
- Anita Yuen as Ho Sau-kit
- Raymond Wong Pak-ming as Tam Kau-fu
- Fung Bo Bo as Mrs. Tam Yuet-yung
- Carol Cheng as Miss 'Coffee' Ho
- Lau Ching-wan as Hou Chung
- Kwan Tak-hing as Grandpa Tam
- Lee Heung-kam as Mama Tam
- William Chu as Tam Kau-kei
- Cho Tat-wah as Tam Tai-foon
- James Wong as George
- Alexander Lee
- Chow Chi-fai as Judge
- Jameson Lam as Patron at Japanese restaurant
- Kan Shui-chiu as Chung's father
- Hui Fan as Chung's mother
- Poon An-ying as Yuet-yung's maid
- Wong Wa-wo as Yuet-ying's neighbor
- Chow Kong as Rascal on jetty
- Clifton Ko as Minibus passenger
- Ho Chi-kei
- Hui Si-man as Tam's family relative

== See also ==
- List of Hong Kong films
