= Little Tiger of Canton =

1973 Hong Kong film by Ngai Hoi-fung

Cub Tiger From Kwang Tung
- UK DVD Artwork
- Directed by: Ngai Hoi-Fung
- Written by: Lau Suen
- Produced by: Lee Long Koon
- Starring: Jackie Chan; Chan Hung Lit; Tien Feng; Shu Pei-Pei
- Cinematography: Ng Fat Sam; Wong Kwok Nam; Cheung Chi Keung
- Edited by: Hamilton Yu
- Music by: Frankie Chan
- Production company: Soon Lee Films Co.
- Distributed by: Showbox Home Entertainment (UK)
- Release dates: 1973 (Hong Kong); 2007 (DVD)
- Running time: 85 minutes
- Country: Hong Kong
- Languages: Mandarin; Cantonese

Little Tiger of Canton (simplified Chinese: 广东小老虎; traditional Chinese: 廣東小老虎; pinyin: Guǎngdōng xiǎo lǎohǔ), also known as Cub Tiger From Kwang Tung, is a 1973 Hong Kong martial arts action film directed by Ngai Hoi-Fung and starring Jackie Chan. Chan was 17 when footage for the film was shot in 1971, and it is considered to be his first starring role. A re-edited version of the film, Master with Cracked Fingers, was later released in 1979.

== Background ==
Cub Tiger From Kwang Tung was filmed in Hong Kong in 1971, but only saw a limited cinema release two years later. The small independent release was shelved after its brief run and never received an international release. In the late 1979, in the wake of Chan's success in Snake in the Eagle's Shadow and Drunken Master (both 1978), the film re-emerged at Hong Kong cinemas, in a poorly re-edited version with some newer footage of Dean Shek and Yuen Siu Tien spliced in, along with a rather obvious Jackie Chan double.

The amalgamated footage was sold to US film producer Dick Randall, who dubbed and repackaged it, and gave it an alternative title, Master with Cracked Fingers. The rights were subsequently sold to 21st Century Distribution who gave this version of the film a brief run in US cinemas in 1981, under the title Snake Fist Fighter.

Since Chan became more popular in the West, particularly after the US release of Rumble in the Bronx (1996), the repackaged film has seen numerous VHS and DVD releases from a wide variety of film distributors in the US and UK.

The original film, Cub Tiger From Kwang Tung was finally given an international DVD release for the first time in 2007. It was released in the UK (DVD is 0 region) on Showbox Home Entertainment's Rarescope label. This is the complete original 85 minute film, as it was released in Hong Kong in 1973, without edits and additions. It contains the original Mandarin soundtrack and imbedded English/Chinese subtitles. Due to the poor quality of the print, some of the subtitles are chopped from the foot of the screen, so the DVD contains an additional set of subtitles which appear whenever the originals are cropped or missing.

== Plot ==
Hsiao Hu (Jackie Chan) has been secretly training in martial arts, as his foster father (Tien Feng) has forbidden him. Later, some local store owners ask Ah to help protect them from a greedy Chinese extortion ring. Ah discovers that the crime lord behind the extortion had killed his actual father years before and is determined for revenge.

== Cast ==
Cast	Role
Jackie Chan	Hsiao Hu (original role name, as Chan Yuan Lung) / Ah Lung (1979 version) / Jackie (US redubbed version)
Chan Hung Lit	Chow Bin
Tien Feng	Lung's Foster Father
Shu Pei-Pei	Hsiao Lan
Yuen Biao	Extra
Hon Kwok Choi	Pickpocket (Little Frog)
Chun Chin	Uncle Xia
Chi Ming Wong	cameo
Alan Chui Chung-San	Extra
Mars	Extra
Chin Yuet Sang	Extra

== See also ==
- Master with Cracked Fingers
- Jackie Chan filmography
- List of Hong Kong films
- List of martial arts films
