= The Perfect Wife?! =

1983 Hong Kong film by Dean Shek

- Film poster
- Traditional Chinese: 專撬牆腳
- Simplified Chinese: 专撬墙脚
- Hanyu Pinyin: Zhuān Qiào Qiáng Jiǎo
- Jyutping: Zyun1 Giu3 Ceong4 Geok3
- Directed by: Dean Shek
- Written by: Raymond Wong
- Produced by: Raymond Wong
- Starring: Dean Shek; Eric Tsang; Linda Lau
- Cinematography: Johnny Koo
- Edited by: Tony Chow
- Music by: Teddy Robin
- Distributed by: Cinema City
- Release date: 5 August 1983
- Running time: 95 minutes
- Country: Hong Kong
- Language: Cantonese
- Box office: HK$12,946,443

The Perfect Wife?! is a 1983 Hong Kong romantic comedy film directed Dean Shek and written by Raymond Wong starring Shek, Eric Tsang and Linda Lau.

== Plot ==
Dean Shek is flirty lawyer and expert at dealing with divorce cases who also likes to fool around with married women. One day, he attends the wedding of his friend Bluffer Wong and suddenly thinks about starting a family. Because of his lack of confidence in Hong Kong women, he asks someone to find a woman for him in mainland China and then transform her into his ideal wife. One day, Shek's cousin James Dean comes crying to him saying his fiancé left him for another man. Under Dean's encouragement, James seeks a new lover but finds interest in Dean's wife Chu. Chu is moved by James' gentleness and leaves Dean.

== Cast ==
- Dean Shek as Dean Shek
- Eric Tsang as James Dean
- Linda Lau as Chu
- Paul Chun as Giddy
- May Lo as Windy
- Raymond Wong as Bluffer Wong
- Wong Ching as Angry husband in car (cameo)
- Lily Li
- Jaime Chik as Bluffer's wife
- Rebecca Chan as Girl who burglarized Shek's home
- Wong Sau-man as Chiang Chin
- Margaret Lee as wife in bar
- Angela Pan as Mrs. Deanie Chow
- Kelly Yiu as Student in mortarboard (cameo)
- Fung King-man as Peter Chow (cameo)
- Shrila Chun as Shek's neighbor
- Cheng Miu as judge
- Robert Siu as Shek's legal assistant
- Shirley Kwan as Robert's wife
- Lam Kwok-wai as Robert
- Sze Kai-keung
- Yolande Yau
- Brenda Lo
- James Lai as Clerk of the Court
- Wellington Fung as Peter
- Ng Leung
- Leung Kit-wah
- Cheng Mang-ha as Shek's neighbor
- Lau Leung-fat as Shek's neighbor
- Law Wai-ping
- Fung Kam-hung as Shek's chauffeur
- Law Lan as Ho
- Ma Sau-yin
- Fu Yuk-lan
- Kam Kwok-wai
- Yung Sau-yee
- Tsui Cheung-ying
- Mui Chi-ching
- Ho Kwong-tai
- Wong Hung

== Theme song ==
- The Perfect Wife?! (專撬牆腳)
  - Composer: Samuel Hui
  - Lyricist: Raymond Wong
  - Singer: Karl Maka

== Box office ==
The film grossed HK$12,946,443 at the Hong Kong box office during its theatrical run from 5 to 23 August 1983 in Hong Kong.
