= The Monk (1975 film) =

1975 Hong Kong film by Dean Shek

- Turkish VHS cover
- Traditional Chinese: 出家人
- Simplified Chinese: 出家人
- Hanyu Pinyin: Chū Jiā Rén
- Jyutping: Ceot1 Gaa1 Jan4
- Directed by: Dean Shek
- Screenplay by: Dean Shek
- Produced by: Yip Tak-han
- Starring: Dean Shek; Yen Shi-kwan
- Cinematography: Wong Wing-lung
- Edited by: Tony Chow
- Music by: Frankie Chan
- Production company: Brother Film
- Release date: 12 December 1975
- Country: Hong Kong
- Language: Cantonese

The Monk, also known as The Kung Fu Monks, is a 1975 Hong Kong martial arts film written, directed by and starring Dean Shek, who makes his directorial debut.

== Cast ==
- Dean Shek as Si-hung
- Yen Shi-kwan as Ta-chi
- Fung Hak-on as Foon Ying
- Eddy Ko as Ban Fong's boss
- Shirley Wong as Foon Ying's girl
- Wong Pau-kei as Thug
- Gordon Liu as Foon Ying's thug
- Ho Kei-cheong as Casino manager
- Wong Shu-tong as Pickpocket
- Anna Ho as Prostitute
- Fung Fung as Brothel manager
- San Sin as Monk
- Wan Leng-kwong as Man chasing pickpocket
- Hsu Hsia as Thug
- Chan Tik-hak
- Tang Tak-cheung as Thug
- Lau Kar-wing
- Chan Kon
- Tam Po
- Law Keung
- Chai Lam as Gambler
- Ho Po-sing
- Cheung Chi-ping
- Lai Yan
- Chan Keung
- Chu Kai
- Ho Kei-cheong
- Chui Fat
- Wynn Lau
- Lo Wai
- Wan Fat
- Chik Ngai-hung
- Ning Mung

== Production ==
According to an interview by Dean Shek, the film was developed after a time when Lau Kar-leung asked Shek whether he was daring enough to direct a film, to which Shek replied, "If you dare to invest, I dare to direct".
