= Sleeping Fist =

1979 Hong Kong film by Teddy Yip

- Film poster
- Traditional Chinese: 睡拳怪招
- Simplified Chinese: 睡拳怪招
- Hanyu Pinyin: Shuì Quán Guài Zhāo
- Jyutping: Seoi6 Kyun4 Kwaai3 Ziu1
- Directed by: Teddy Yip
- Screenplay by: Cheung San-yee
- Produced by: Stanley Chow
- Starring: Bryan Leung; Yuen Siu-tien
- Edited by: Cheung Kwok-kuen
- Music by: Stanley Chow
- Production company: East Asia (HK) Films
- Distributed by: Goldig Films (HK)
- Release date: 24 May 1979
- Running time: 88 minutes
- Country: Hong Kong
- Language: Cantonese
- Box office: HK$1,204,494.50

Sleeping Fist is a 1979 Hong Kong martial arts film directed by Teddy Yip and starring Bryan Leung and Yuen Siu-tien.

== Plot ==
Plainclothes policeman Kam Tai-fat (Bryan Leung) discovers the crimes committed by Cho Tin-pa (Eddy Ko) and plans to report it to the capitol. When Cho discovers this, he sends a group of thugs to hunt Kam down. One day, Kam was severely beaten by Cho's thug and there, he meets Kid (Wong Yat-lung), a street urchin who rescues him and takes him to his master Old Fox (Yuen Siu-tien).

One day, Kid was injured in a fight with local bullies. Seeing this, Fox decides to teach Kam and Kid the martial arts style of Sleeping Fist. Fox, Kam and Kid then sets foot to Shang Wei martial arts school to teach a lesson to the bullies who injured Kid earlier. The trio easily defeat them. Feeling humiliated, Shang Wei school hires Cho, a master of Eagle Claw, to seek revenge.

== Cast ==
- Bryan Leung as Kam Tai-fat
- Yuen Siu-tien as Old Fox
- Wong Yat-lung as Kid
- Suen Lam
- Au-yeung Ling-lung as The girl
- Ma Chin-ku
- Eddy Ko as Cho Tai-pa
- Weng Hsiao-hu
- Ching Kuo-chung
- Au Lap-po as Waiter
- Shih Ting-ken
- Chik Ngai-hung
- Siu Tak-fu
- Law Hon
- Chow Kam-kong as Student
- Chu Ko as Rascal

== Reception ==
=== Critical ===
Eion Friel of The Action Elite rated the film three out of five stars and gave a mixed review. He ultimately concluded the review and writes "Overall, Sleeping Fist is a hugely entertaining kung fu movie, let down by some awful dubbing which causes more unintentional laughter than anything else." J. Doyle Wallis of DVD Talk also rated the film three out of five stars and writes "Sleeping Fist is still so well paced and infused with enough character that I really didn't mind the cute stuff as much as I usually would (some cute moments to look out for, Old Fox steering the Kid around like a puppet fighting a group of thugs- the kid when finally liking Old Fox, dresses exactly like him- some urination humor)." Andrew Saroch of Far East Films rated the film the same score as well and gave a mixed review criticizing its predictable story with no plot twist and also praising the action scenes and lead actor Bryan Leung's performance.

=== Box office ===
The film grossed HK$1,204,494.50 at the Hong Kong box office during its theatrical from 24 May to 1 June 1979 in Hong Kong.
