= The Magnificent Kick =

1980 Hong Kong film by Daniel Lau

- Directed by: Daniel Lau Tan Ching
- Screenplay by: Szeto On; Wong Mei Ling (script supervisor)
- Produced by: Ng Why
- Starring: Kwan Tak-Hing; Jason Pai Piao; Cecilla Wong
- Cinematography: Ho Hak Wai
- Edited by: Robert Choi Hung
- Music by: Yui Wing Siu; So Yung
- Production company: Friendship Films (H.K)
- Release date: 18 December 1980 (H.K.)
- Running time: 87 minutes
- Country: Hong Kong
- Languages: Cantonese version English Version

The Magnificent Kick (Chinese: 黃飛鴻與鬼腳七) (also known as Secret Kick of Death in the U.K) is a 1980 Hong Kong martial arts biography film. The film is a flashback story of the life of Wong Fei Hung, the Chinese martial arts master and folk hero of Cantonese ethnicity, and is named after his trademark move- a kick too fast to be countered, known as 'the shadowless kick'. The director is Daniel Lau Tan Ching, and the producer is Ng Why. The film stars Kwan Tak-hing, Jason Pai Piao, Cecilia Wong and Han Ying-chieh. The production company is Friendship Films (H.K.) Co, Hsu Tang is the production manager, the screenplay is by Sze-To On, and the script supervisor is Wong Mei Ling. The martial art used in the film by Kwan Tak-hing is Hung Ga / Hung Gar.

== Kwan Tak-hing as Wong Fei Hung ==
Kwan Tak-hing played the role of the famous chinese martial artist and physician Wong Fei Hung (1847-1924) in 77 films between 1949 and 1981. That is a world record for the portrayal of one character by the same actor in feature films. The first of his portrayals was in the 1949 film The Story of Huang Fei-hung Part 1, and in 1956, he starred as Fei-hung in 25 films. The production of the Fei-hung films ended in 1970, but was revived in 1974 with The Skyhawk, followed by a television series, and then the films Magnificent Butcher in 1979, Magnificent Kick in 1980 and Dreadnaught in 1981. By the time he starred in The Magnificent Kick, Kwan Tak-hing was 75 years of age and a stunt man had to take his place for the most physical scenes.

== Cast ==
- Kwan Tak-hing as Wong Fei Hung / Wong Feihong
- Jason Pai Piao as Ah Su
- Cecilla Wong
- Han Ying-chieh
- Nick Cheung Lik
- Chiang Tao
- Lau Hok Nin
- Alan Chan Kwok
- Ma Chan San
- Lee Fat Yuen
- Fung Ging Man
- Cham Siu Hung
- Wong Mei
- Sai Gwa Pau
- Chong Wai
- Ma Kim Ying
- Tai San
- Chan Ling Wai
- Ma Hon Yuen
- Chan Leung
- Lai Kim Hung
- Ho Bo Sing

== See also ==
- Cinema of Hong Kong
