= The Magnificent Butcher =

1979 Hong Kong film by Yuen Woo-ping

- Hong Kong film poster
- Traditional Chinese: 林世榮
- Simplified Chinese: 林世荣
- Hanyu Pinyin: Lín Shìróng
- Jyutping: Lam4 Sai3 Wing4
- Directed by: Yuen Woo-ping
- Written by: Edward Tang
- Produced by: Raymond Chow
- Starring: Sammo Hung; Kwan Tak-hing; Yuen Biao; Wei Pai
- Cinematography: Ma Koon-wah
- Edited by: Peter Cheung
- Music by: Frankie Chan
- Production company: Golden Harvest Productions
- Distributed by: Golden Harvest
- Release date: 19 December 1979
- Running time: 108 minutes
- Country: Hong Kong
- Language: Cantonese
- Box office: HK $3,945,341.40

Magnificent Butcher
- Traditional Chinese: 林世榮
- Simplified Chinese: 林世荣
- Literal meaning: "Lam Sai-wing"
Transcriptions
Standard Mandarin
- Hanyu Pinyin: Lín Shìróng
Yue: Cantonese
- Jyutping: Lam4 Sai3 Wing4

The Magnificent Butcher (Chinese: 林世榮) is a 1979 Hong Kong martial arts comedy film directed by Yuen Woo-ping, and starring Sammo Hung, Kwan Tak-hing, Yuen Biao, and Wei Pai.

The film is based on the story of Lam Sai-wing, one of the students of the legendary Chinese folk hero Wong Fei-hung. Hung plays "Butcher" Lam Sai-wing and Kwan Tak-hing plays Wong Fei-hung, a role he had played before in over 70 films. The film also features Hung's opera "brother" Yuen Biao as another of Wong's students, Leung Foon, a role he would reprise years later in the film Once Upon a Time in China along with Jet Li.

The Magnificent Butcher was produced as Hung's attempt to duplicate the success of Yuen's 1978 martial arts action comedy film Drunken Master, which also featured the characters of Wong and Beggar So.

== Plot ==
Lam Sai-wing (Sammo Hung), also known as Butcher Wing, is a student of Wong Fei-hung (Kwan Tak-hing). Butcher Wing's long-lost brother Lam Sai-kwong (Chiang Kam) comes to town with his beautiful wife Yuet-mei (Tong Ching). Ko Tai-hoi (Fung Hak-on), the son of Master Ko (Lee Hoi-sang), sees Yuet-mei and, lusting for her, abducts her. The abduction is witnessed by Master Ko's goddaughter Lan-hsing (JoJo Chan).

Wong Fei-hung goes out of town, and leaves Butcher Wing and the other disciples, including Leung Foon (Yuen Biao) and Chat (Wei Pai), to fend for themselves. Sai-kwong assaults Tai-hoi, threatening to murder him if he doesn't free Yuet-mei. Butcher Wing arrives and witnesses Sai-kwong beating Tai-hoi. Not recognizing Sai-kwong, Butcher Wing stops him and drives him off. A despondent Sai-kwong decides to commit suicide but is saved by the wily drunkard Beggar So (Fan Mei Sheng), an old friend of Wong Fei-hung with equally good kung fu skills. Sai-kwong explains his situation to Beggar So. Beggar So confronts Tai-hoi, who claims that Butcher Wing took Yuet-mei. Beggar So confronts Butcher Wing, accusing him of abducting his brother's wife. Butcher Wing asks to meet this supposed brother of his. Beggar So introduces Butcher Wing to Sai-kwong, and they realize who each other are. Butcher Wing, Sai-kwong, and Beggar So realize that Tai-hoi still has Yuet-mei.

Lan-hsing attempts to rescue Yuet-mei but is caught by Tai-hoi, who holds Lan-hsing captive as well. Butcher Wing and Beggar So unite and free Yuet-mei from Tai-hoi's henchmen. They also free Lan-hsing, assuming that she's just another of Tai-hoi's captives and not realizing that she is Master Ko's goddaughter. She keeps her identity secret. They go to Butcher Wing's house. Butcher Wing unwittingly insults Lan-hsing, who decides to punish him. Beggar So drinks too much alcohol and loses consciousness. For the sake of inconveniencing Butcher Wing, Lan-hsing insists on staying at his house that night, claiming to be homeless and feigning an injury that leaves her unable to walk. She climbs into his bed. Beggar So awakens. Butcher Wing invites Beggar So out for more drinks to stop him from noticing that Lan-hsing is in Butcher Wing's bed, and they leave. Tai-hoi breaks into Butcher Wing's house and attempts to rape Lan-hsing. She resists, screaming, and while trying to silence her, Tai-hoi accidentally kills her. The murder is overheard by a passing night watchman. Tai-hoi flees, unknowingly leaving behind an identifying ring, which the night watchman finds.

Tai-hoi accuses Butcher Wing of the murder. Believing that Butcher Wing will take refuge at Po Chi Lam (Wong Fei-hung's school), Master Ko goes there with two of his students and destroys Po Chi Lam's sign. Leung Foon and Chat attack Master Ko and his students. Butcher Wing arrives during the fight, and Master Ko fatally injures him. Leung Foon and Chat take the dying Butcher Wing to Beggar So, who successfully treats his injuries and critiques his kung fu. Butcher Wing asking the old man to teach him how to improve his kung fu, he is made to undergo rigorous training.

The night watchman attempts to extort Tai-hoi, selling the ring back to him. Tai-hoi attempts to murder the night watchman, who flees. The night watchman encounters Sai-kwong and Yuet-mei and tells them that Tai-hoi was Lan-hsing's murderer. Tai-hoi then catches up and murders the night watchman and Sai-kwong. Yuet-mei escapes with the ring, which she gives to Butcher Wing. She tells him everything.

Later on, Butcher Wing was destroying Tai-hoi's private party that Tai-hoi is holding on a rented boat, Butcher Wing walks in holding Sai-kwong's funeral tablet. However, Wing will murder Tai-hoi to avenge Sai-kwong, then attacks. Everyone but Tai-hoi flees, Tai-hoi fights back, but Butcher Wing proves himself the superior fighter, Tai-hoi tries to flee, but Butcher Wing stops Tai-hoi. Finally Tai-hoi begs for mercy, groveling on the floor and bowing to Sai-kwong's funeral tablet, Butcher Wing hit Tai-hoi's head with the funeral tablet, and he died.

In the morning, Master Ko was upset about his son's death and sets up Tai-hoi's funeral in the town square and waits for Butcher Wing, who will come that way. When Butcher Wing comes, Master Ko attempts to murder him, Butcher Wing fights back, using Tai-hoi's funeral tablet against Master Ko, that Master Ko breaks Tai-hoi's funeral tablet, even more infuriated, Master Ko redoubles his attack, with help from Beggar So, Butcher Wing to defeat Master Ko into a submission. After the fight, Wong Fei-hung returns, as the film ends with a joke as Wong Fei-hung prepares to punish Butcher Wing for incorrectly replacing Po Chi Lam's sign was turned upside down.

== Cast ==
- Sammo Hung as Butcher Lam Sai-wing
- Kwan Tak-hing as Wong Fei-hung
- Yuen Biao as Leung Foon
- Wei Pai as Chat (Seven)
- Fan Mei-sheng as Beggar So
- Chung Fat as Wildcat
- Hoi Sang Lee as Master Ko
- Fung Hak-on as Ko Tai-hoi
- JoJo Chan as Ko Lan-hsing
- Tong Ching as Cheung Yuet-mei
- Chiang Kam as Lam Sai-kwong
- Lam Ching-ying as Killer with Fan
- Yuen Miu as Pole Man
- Tsang Choh-lam as Night watchman
- Fung Ging Man Chess player
- Sai Gwa-Pau as So
- Ho Pak-kwong as Blind man
- Ka Lee as Waiter
- Billy Chan as Tai-hoi's friend #1
- Max Lee as Tai-hoi's friend #2
- Lau Kwok-shing as Butcher Chang
- Chow Kam-kong as Master Ko's disciple
- Wellsin Chin as Master Ko's disciple
- Ho Tin-shing as Master Ko's disciple
- Fong Ping as Club girl

== Production ==
Yuen Woo-ping's father Yuen Siu-tien, was set to reprise his role as Beggar So in this film. However, elder Yuen died of heart attack before The Magnificent Butcher's production began and was replaced by Fan Mei-sheng.

== Reception ==
Entertainment Weekly gave the film a C+ rating, stating that "only hardcore chopsocky connoisseurs could love the 20-year-old relic" noting the films "bleary picture and cartoonishly bad dubbing" The review did praise Sammo Hung's role in the film, stating that "Hung shows us his stuff: an agility amazing for one of such ample girth and a comic persona that converts even his deadliest duels into slapstick ballet."

J. Doyle Wallis of DVD Talk rated it 3.5/5 stars and wrote, "Typical of the time, it is part of the standard and formulaic Drunken Master comedy/action clones, though, it is one of the better ones." Bill Gibron of DVD Talk rated it 93/100 and wrote, "Even though it ends too abruptly and takes a little while to get started, The Magnificent Butcher is still one of the best old-fashioned martial arts movies ever made".

== See also ==
- List of Hong Kong films
- Sammo Hung filmography
- Wong Fei-hung filmography
- Yuen Biao filmography
