= The Family Strikes Back =

1986 Hong Kong film by Dean Shek

- VCD cover
- Traditional Chinese: 烏龍大家庭
- Simplified Chinese: 乌龙大家庭
- Hanyu Pinyin: Wū Lóng Dà Jiā Tíng
- Jyutping: Wu1 Lung2 Daai6 Gaa Ting4
- Directed by: Dean Shek
- Screenplay by: Edward Lee
- Produced by: Dean Shek
- Starring: Dean Shek; Anglie Leung; Kwan Tak-hing; Gigi Lai; Gary Young Lim; Lau Tat-sang; Roy Chiao; Lee Heung-kam; Cho Tat-wah
- Cinematography: Henry Chan
- Edited by: Wong Ming-lam
- Music by: Tony Lo
- Production company: Cinema City
- Distributed by: Cinema City
- Release date: 27 March 1986
- Running time: 85 minutes
- Country: Hong Kong
- Language: Cantonese
- Box office: HK$7,229,517

The Family Strikes Back is a 1986 Hong Kong action comedy film produced, directed by and starring Dean Shek.

The film focuses on a mad scientist who orders his assistants to kidnap victims for use in his experiments. When a martial artist and his assistant intervene in a kidnapping incident, a police inspector has the idea to employ the martial artist as an undercover agent for the police. The martial artist has to impersonate a Japanese ally of the villain.

== Plot ==
Professor Kiu (Roy Chiao) is a mad scientist who developed mental disorders from grieving the death of his son. Kiu orders his assistants to kidnap men to his lab, located in a private container on a vessel, for experiments. Police inspector Uncle Wah (Cho Tat-wah) had sent his subordinates to gather evidence in the vessel, but failed to find any.

Shek La-mai (Dean Shek), an acrobatic performer working in a nightclub, has practiced martial arts since childhood and was a former commander of the Special Duties Unit before he was dismissed by the police force due to accusations of sadism. Shek is currently a single father of three children living a happy life.

One night during his performance, Shek and his protege, Lam Hong (Gary Lam), witnessed and intervened in a kidnapping incident by Kiu's henchmen, and the two became targets of Kiu. On the other hand, Uncle Wah discovers Shek's resemblance to a Japanese scientist named Toyota, who colluded with Kiu. Wah formulates a plan for Shek to act undercover as Toyota in order to gather evidence from Kiu's lab.

== Cast ==
- Dean Shek as Shek La-mai
- Angile Leung as Vennila
- Kwan Tak-hing as Shek Fei-hung
- Gigi Lai as Shek Lai-chi
- Gary Young Lim as Lam Jan Hong
- Lau Tat-sang as Sonny
- Roy Chiao as Professor Kiu
- Lee Heung-kam as Kiu's wife
- Cho Tat-wah as Uncle Wah
- Pomson Shi as Luk
- Helen Chan as Helen
- Kam Shan as thug
- Hoi Sang Lee as Kiu's Henchman
- Sai Gwa-Pau as So
- Liu Chun-hung
- Kingson Shek as Cop
- Hui Ying-ying
- Yiu Yau-hung
- Wellington Fung as Manager
- Teddy Chan as Police Inspector
- Lau Shung-fung
- Lo Wing
- Lo Hung
- Wong Lai-ching
- Fong Chow
- Wonh Kin-chow
- Pai Lan
- Wong On-tung
- Lim Chan
- Lee Yan-fai
- Robert Goodson as Police commissioner
- Barry Bullock as Inspector Kei
- Don Ferguson
- Jonathan Pine
- Roy Stanton
- Cliff Clark
- Chang Sing-kwong

== Box office ==
The film grossed HK$7,229,517 at the Hong Kong box office during its theatrical run from 27 March to 9 April 1986.
