= The Dragon from Russia =

1990 Hong Kong film by Clarence Fok

Dragon from Russia
- DVD front cover
- Traditional Chinese: 紅場飛龍
- Simplified Chinese: 红场飞龙
- Hanyu Pinyin: Hóng Chǎng Fēi Lóng
- Jyutping: Hung4 Ceong4 Fei1 Lung4
- Directed by: Clarence Fok
- Screenplay by: Ella Chan
- Based on: Crying Freeman by Ryoichi Ikegami and Kazuo Koike
- Produced by: Dean Shek
- Starring: Sam Hui; Maggie Cheung; Nina Li Chi; Carrie Ng; Loletta Lee; Dean Shek
- Cinematography: Peter Ngor
- Edited by: Wong Ming-lam
- Music by: Violet Lam; Sam Hui
- Production company: Cinema City Entertainment
- Distributed by: Golden Princess Amusement
- Release date: 3 August 1990 (Hong Kong)
- Running time: 96 minutes
- Country: Hong Kong
- Language: Cantonese
- Box office: HK$11,634,700

The Dragon from Russia is a 1990 Hong Kong martial arts action film directed by Clarence Fok. It is based on the Japanese manga Crying Freeman, written by Kazuo Koike and Ryoichi Ikegami, produced by Dean Shek, and stars Sam Hui, Maggie Cheung, Nina Li Chi, Carrie Ng, and Loletta Lee. The film also guest stars Shek in his second-to-last film appearance before retiring from acting two years later.

== Plot ==
Yao Lung and May Yip are orphans who live in Russia with their adoptive family. Through the years, the two fall in love and promise that they will be together forever. One fateful day, Yao witnesses a murder being committed by a mysterious assassin. Shortly after this, he is captured and brainwashed by a mysterious cult of assassins that call themselves "800 Dragons". After losing his memory of his past, he is forced to take very strict martial arts training to become the perfect assassin for the 800 Dragons.

During one of his missions, Yao is seen by May, his past lover who is still looking for him. The code of the 800 Dragons is that anyone who sees an assassin during their mission needs to be killed. But Yao begin to remember his past when May talks to him about their past relationship. Yao decides to follow his heart instead of the strict code of the assassin by not killing May. Now Yao and May must run for their lives. Knowing that Yao fails to follow the order, the 800 Dragons are now trying to kill both of them.

== Cast ==
- Sam Hui as Yao Lung
- Maggie Cheung as May Yip
- Nina Li Chi as Chimer
- Carrie Ng as Huntress
- Loletta Lee as Pearl
- Dean Shek as Snooker (guest star)
- Suen Hing as Officer Sunny
- Yuen Tak as Teddy Wong / Master of Death
- Pai Ying as Frankie
- Lau Shun as Mr. Kishudi
- Ann Mui as May
- Sarah Lee as Queenie

== Box office ==
The film grossed HK$11,634,700 at the Hong Kong box office during its theatrical run from 3 August to 16 August 1990.

== DVD release ==
On 24 February 2003, the movie was released by Hong Kong Legends in Europe as a Region 2 DVD.

Ten months later, Hong Kong Legends DVD were released on 29 December 2003 in a 3 disc set Manga in Motion including two other martial arts films: Story of Ricky and City Hunter.
