= My Life's on the Line =

- Theatrical Poster
- Traditional Chinese: 賭命走天涯
- Simplified Chinese: 赌命走天涯
- Hanyu Pinyin: Dǔ Mìng Zǒu Tiān Yá
- Jyutping: Dou2 Ming6 Zau2 Tin1 Ngai4
- Directed by: Chester Wong
- Produced by: Hu Tai-fu
- Starring: Bryan Leung; Dean Shek; Man Lee-pang
- Cinematography: Chui Tung-hung
- Edited by: Kwok Ting-hung
- Music by: Stanley Chow
- Release date: 7 December 1978
- Running time: 91 minutes
- Country: Taiwan
- Language: Mandarin

My Life's on the Line, known as 60 Second Assassin in the West, is a 1978 Taiwanese martial arts film directed by Chester Wong and starring Bryan Leung, Dean Shek and Man Lee-pang.

== Plot ==
The infamous Fong Chin aka "Minute Fong" is so-called throughout the kung fu world for his ability to defeat, or kill if required, an opponent in under a minute (while keeping track with his father's gold watch). With such an effective technique, Fong naturally gains an unnerving reputation and certain people either want to hire him as a hitman or want him dead. One particular low-life plans to have Fong Chin killed (not knowing that Fong Chin is sitting right next to him) to cover up murdering his own father and numerous other crimes. Fong Chin kills him and his henchmen, in less than a minute. Nonetheless, Fong's brother isn't pleased with Fong's choice of employment, despite Fong's ability to take care of him financially. His brother urges him to give up fighting and killing, though Fong claims that he only kills those that deserve it, and a flashback reveals that as a child, Fong witnessed him and his brothers parents being murdered by bandits.

With all this emotional baggage, Fong Chin begins to rethink the actions of his life. His prostitute girlfriend, Ying Ying, wants to live a normal life with him, but he rejects her pleas, gives her money, and leaves after dealing with two men trying to physically assault her. However, once he reconsiders and returns to her, he finds that she's committed suicide by drinking poison. His employer, Chow Sau-tung (Bryan Leung), gets news that Fong Chin may try to quit, but Chow has other plans for him. Meanwhile, more fighters (hired by Chow Sau-tung) keep trying to take their shot at Fong, including a corrupt police officer.

Although Fong sees his priorities in life changing, Chow Sau-tung promises him wealth for another assignment; to kill a man in his 50's named ‘Lai’ in a specified town. Fong Chin takes the job under the agreement that it will be his last. The obvious catch is that the town is inhabited by scores of men with this name and therefore, Fong must carefully search out his target.

While staying in the designated location, Fong befriends a local boy who proves to be a mischievous, yet good-hearted youngster who is merely looking for a father figure. Eventually, Fong meets the boys’ widowed mother, Chu Hua (who reminds him of Ying Ying), and agrees to teach him kung fu on the condition that he goes to school. Initially, Chu Hua is against her son learning martial arts as she blames it for her husband's death, but eventually opens to it. As the master-student bond develops, the boy's behavior improves, and so does the relationships between Fong, Chu Hua, and the youngster's grandfather, the target himself, Mr. Lai (who becomes suspicious when he finds out about Fong's particular gold watch).

Fully immersed in this ordinary life, Fong Chin becomes laxed about completing his assignment. In the meantime, Chow Sau-tung is growing increasingly frustrated with Fong Chin for not killing Lai based on information from two of his men that have been spying on Fong. Chow Sau-tung sends his two henchmen to remind Fong of his job and he has three days to do it. When Fong Chin finally confronts and attacks Mr. Lai, Mr. Lai's grandson jumps in to defend him and is accidentally hit by Fong Chin. The boy dies in his mother's and grandfather's arms shortly afterwards. The distraught Fong Chin screams in sadness and runs away while Chu Hua and Mr. Lai grieve. Little time is left for Mr. Lai to mourn for his grandson as Chow Sau-tung's henchmen arrive to finish the job that Fong Chin couldn't. Fong Chin returns the next morning to find the entire family dead, including Chu Hua being raped before being murdered.

A distressed Fong Chin returns to his brother, who scolds Fong and tells him that Mr. Lai was an innocent man, and it was Chow Sau-tung's intention for the entire remaining family to be killed as payback to Mr. Lai's (already deceased) son. Realizing that Chow Sau-tung lied to him about everything, Fong Chin hunts him and his henchman down to get revenge for the murdered Lai family.

== Cast ==
- Bryan Leung as Chow Sau-tung
- Dean Shek as Master "Handsome"
- Man Lee-pang as Minute Fong Chin
- Wong Chi-sang as Fong's first victim
- Wong Wing-sang as Fong's second victim
- Lung Fei as Yang Kuei
- Su Chen-ping as Old Man Lai
- Wong Man-chuen as Ying Ying
- Yuen Fong
- Chim Lung
- Siu Boon
- Wong Yue-hong
- Kong Ching-ha as Fong's mother (cameo)
- Sit Hon as Fong's father (cameo)
- Woo Hon-keung
- Choi Chung-chau
- Clement Yip
- Lee Lung-yam as Servant
- Au Lap-bo as Waiter
- Pui Bik
- Chek Bau
- Tang Keung-mei
- Tang Keung-ying
