= Kung Hei Fat Choy (film) =

1985 Hong Kong film by Dean Shek

- DVD cover
- Traditional Chinese: 恭喜發財
- Simplified Chinese: 恭喜发财
- Hanyu Pinyin: Gōng Xǐ Fā Cái
- Jyutping: Gung1 Hei2 Faat3 Coi4
- Directed by: Dean Shek
- Written by: Raymond Wong
- Produced by: Karl Maka; Dean Shek; Raymond Wong
- Starring: Dean Shek; Alan Tam; George Lam; Siu Ban-ban; Michael Chan; Ann Bridgewater
- Cinematography: Joe Chan
- Edited by: Tony Chow
- Music by: Lam Miu-tak; Tang Siu-lam
- Production company: Cinema City Company
- Distributed by: Cinema City Company
- Release date: 15 February 1985
- Running time: 92 minutes
- Country: Hong Kong
- Language: Cantonese
- Box office: HK$18,418,994

Kung Hei Fat Choy is a 1985 Hong Kong comedy film produced, directed by and starring Dean Shek. The film co-stars Alan Tam and George Lam. Released to celebrate the Chinese New Year of 1985, the film's title is based on the greeting wishers give on the new year's first day.

== Plot ==
Money God (Alan Tam) has caused trouble in Heaven and as punishment, he is sent to Earth to do good deeds for mankind. His deific powers have been restricted and can only be restored at a time of great need via a charm kept inside a silk brocade bag containing the words 'Kung Hei Fat Choy'. Money God crashes in Hong Kong, the impact causing a massive hole and several blackouts in the heart of the city. Several policemen and journalists including Ellen (Ann Bridgewater) arrive while Money God emerges in the gathering crowd. Due to his unusual and anachronistic attire, he is mistaken for a mental patient and chased by police. He hides inside a water bottle that is picked up by Ben (Siu Ban Ban), Ellen's nephew. At home, Money God appears before Ben and befriends him by making his toys perform for him. He convinces the child he is a deity but is attacked by Ben's father, Fung (Dean Shek), who believes he is a robber. Money God eventually convinces him he is a god of wealth by summoning a rain cloud and turning a cup into a ball of solid gold (although he turns it into an ordinary ball upon seeing Fung reveal his greed for material wealth). He explains to Fung that true wealth comes from within such as fulfilment from helping others, and decides to help his fast food business from going bankrupt, promising him he will become a rich man in three months if he lets him help. A gracious Fung declares Money God as his adopted father and gives him a makeover to blend in with the crowd. At his restaurant, Money God convinces Fung to smile more and to be considerate of those around as it is through their patronage that he earns a livelihood. Sure enough, Fung becomes altruistic and respectful of his employees and customers, and his business improves.

Fung is then taken to see a loan shark Mo (George Lam) to settle their debt. When he is unable to pay, Mo threatens to remove his fingers and toes if he does not pay him back in ten days. Money God, Ellen, and Ben later see Mo running for office and are disgusted by the sleazy and exploitative nature of his campaign. Money God takes to the stage and makes a counter speech. He receives a standing ovation (and Ellen's affection) while Mo is chased off. In retaliation, Mo and his henchmen go to Fung's apartment and throw him off a balcony. Money God saves him and he meets Mo, who immediately tries to exploit him for immeasurable wealth. Money God tricks Mo into acting like a buffoon at a bank and Mo is thrown into a mental asylum. Humiliated, he swears revenge - by enlisting the help of three Ghost Exterminators, who confront Money God and Fung's family at a toy fair. However, Money God fends them off by animating several military toys. During the commotion, Ben witnesses Mo and his henchmen abduct Ellen. He tells his father who immediately gives chase, resulting in a highway pursuit across Hong Kong. Money God tries to use his powers to get her back, but finds they have receded as unbeknownst to him, his charm had been lost by Ben who mistook the pouch for a candy bag. Ellen fights her abductors, causing their car to crash. Money God finds Mo and, pretending to be the spirit of his father, convinces him to use his money for good. Mo proclaims his epiphany, writing off Fung's debt and vowing to Money God that he will mend his ways before his bewildered henchmen. The group hold a celebration at Mo's headquarters.

Meanwhile, news of Money God's appearance in Hong Kong has caught the attention of NASA. Mistaking his Hanfu dress as evidence of extraterrestrial technology, they send out forces armed with plasma guns to apprehend him for experimentation. Mo is alerted of their presence and the group escape to the rooftop. Money God realizes his charm has been lost and the encroaching militia shoot at him, knocking him off the building. As he falls, his body lights up the characters 'Kung Hei Fat Choy' and he is transformed back into his deific appearance, powers restored. He transforms the plasma shots into gold coins that fall onto the streets, much to the delight of the pedestrians and NASA forces, who cease in their pursuit of him. Money God is then called back to Heaven, having fulfilled his purpose in helping out mankind by helping Fung and rehabilitating Mo. Years later, many of the characters' lives are revealed to have changed for the better: Fung has become a successful restaurateur, Mo has been elected mayor, and many members of his loan shark business have become police officers.

== Cast ==
- Dean Shek as Fung
- Alan Tam as Money God
- George Lam as "Mo"
- Siu Ban-ban as Ben
- Michael Chan as Man
- Ann Bridgewater as Ellen Fung
- Yiu Yau-hung as Mo's Son
- Cho Tat-wah as Superintendent of Police
- Fung King-man as Loan Shark Ping / Lee, The Pimp
- Karl Maka as Pedestrian Grabbing Gold (cameo)
- Tsui Hark as Pedestrian Grabbing Gold (cameo)
- Raymond Wong as Pedestrian Grabbing Gold (cameo)
- Yat Boon-Chai as Policeman
- Fei Pak as Policeman
- Foo Wang-tat as Professor Lam
- Hui Ying-ying as Auntie Shun
- Yu Mo-lin as Bride At Mass Wedding
- Lau Leung-fat as Mental Patient Doctor
- Shing Wan-on as Mo's Thug
- Shing Fui-On as Mo's Thug
- Raymond Fung as Doctor
- Yeung Yau-cheung as Chuen
- Fung Gam-hung as Taxi Driver

== Theme song ==
- I Love the World (我愛世界)
  - Composer: Alvin Kwok
  - Lyricist: Raymond Wong
  - Singer: Alan Tam

== Box office ==
The film grossed HK$18,418,994 at the Hong Kong box office during its theatrical run from 15 February to 5 March in 1985.
