= Kwan Tak-hing =

Hong Kong martial artist and actor

Kwan Tak-hing MBE
- 關德興
- Born: 27 June 1905; Guangzhou, Qing Empire
- Died: 28 June 1996 (aged 91); British Hong Kong
- Burial place: Kowloon, British Hong Kong (former); San Francisco
- Occupations: martial artist; actor
- Years active: 1932–1994
- Spouses: Chan Yat-chor (m. 1928, unknown) Kwan Yut-chur (m. 1984, died)
- Children: 1

Chinese name
- Traditional Chinese: 關德興
- Simplified Chinese: 关德兴
Transcriptions
Standard Mandarin
- Hanyu Pinyin: Guān Déxīng
Yue: Cantonese
- Jyutping: Gwaan^{1} Dak^{1} Hing^{1}

Kwan Tak-hing MBE (27 June 1905 – 28 June 1996) was a Hong Kong martial artist and actor best known for his portrayal of martial artist folk hero Wong Fei-hung in at least 77 films, between the 1940s and the 1980s. No one else in cinema history has portrayed the same person as many times. In total he made over 130 films. He was elected in 1955 as the chairman of the Chinese Artist Association of Hong Kong. He was awarded the MBE (Member of the Order of the British Empire) in 1982.

== History ==
Kwan was born in Guangzhou, China in 1905. He was the second child in the family. His father died of a disease at a young age. To supplement his family's income, as a boy, Kwan worked as a cowherd. When he was 12, he began work in construction. At the age of 13, he worked as a waiter in a restaurant in Singapore before joining a Cantonese opera troupe under Cheng Hsin-pei.

In 1928 at the age of 23, he married Chan Yat-chor (陳日初), the daughter of the actor known only by his nickname of "Bind-Legged Champ" (扎腳勝), and they had a son David Kwan Hon-chuen (關漢泉).

His film debut was in The Singing Lovers (aka Romance of the Songsters), made in the US for the Grandview Studios and only the second Cantonese-language talkie ever made. His first starring roles came two years later in Song of the Yesterday (aka Yesterday's Song) and Song of Sadness (both 1935). Kwan's first martial arts film was Knight of the Whip (1936). During World War II he was in a troupe of patriotic entertainers and had a price put on his head by the Japanese.

The first film in which he starred as Wong Fei-hung was the Story of Huang Feihong part 1 (1949) directed by Wu Pang and produced by the Yong Yao Film Company. The film included Shih Kien as the villain and Li Lan, the very first winner of the Miss Hong Kong Pageant, and the first of many winners who would become famous actresses in Hong Kong). This partnership was a huge success and spawned many sequels, exploring many ideas and situations used in later action films. In 1956, a total of 25 Wong Fei-hung films were released.

Kwan worked on films with two of the students of Lam Sai-wing (himself a student of the real Wong Fei-hung). First, Leong Wing-hang, who worked as action director on Wong Fei-hung films as well as other Kwan vehicles including The Five Heroes' Deadly Spears (1951). Later he worked with Lau Cham, father of Lau Kar-leung and Lau Kar-wing.

The Wong Fei-hung sequence of films ended in 1970 and Kwan went into semi-retirement. During this period, Kwan opened a martial arts school and a number of herbal centres, whose branded soup and an ointment for bruises were well known in Hong Kong.

In 1974, Golden Harvest revived the role, pairing Kwan with Sammo Hung in The Skyhawk. Other films followed in which Kwan played his most familiar role – Magnificent Butcher (1979), Magnificent Kick (1980), and Dreadnaught (1981). TVB also aired a 13-part television series featuring Kwan as Wong Fei-hung in 1976. By this time, he was in his 70s and although he was doubled for the more athletic scenes, he still demonstrated remarkable fitness and suppleness.

Kwan received an honorary MBE for his charitable work and contribution to the entertainment industry, in 1984. On 5 November 1984, Kwan married his second wife Kwan Yut-chur in Reno, Nevada, whom he first met whilst travelling in the US, whilst raising money for the Chinese war effort.

To the Chinese, Kwan embodied Confucian virtues and patriarchal authority, and he is thought to have modelled his speeches on those of Sun Yat-sen. Kwan appeared in cameo roles in The Family Strikes Back and Aces Go Places 4 (both 1986). His final film appearance was in the 1994 family comedy film It's a Wonderful Life!, at the age of 89, some 61 years after his acting career began. He died on the day after his 91st birthday of pancreatic cancer.

In Bey Logan's audio commentary for the film The Magnificent Butcher, he states that though there is a grave marker to Kwan Tak-hing in Kowloon territory, his ashes were already taken to San Francisco to rest with those of his second wife.

== Action style ==
Kwan was originally a practitioner of the Opera Martial Arts of Masters Sun Pak/Cheng Hsin-pei and Len Yuen-hang and the White Crane and Hung Gar martial art of Fok Hung. Throughout his life he made friends with famous martial arts exponents and cross trained extensively. Training in Wong Fei-hung's style of Hung Gar came from Leung Wing-hang and Lau Jam, both students of the famous Lam Sai-wing. His weapons speciality included the use of the bullwhip and the pole. Kwan was also known for his skills in the lion dance and Chinese calligraphy.

== Legacy ==
Although modern martial arts films often feature a lot of violence, at the end of The Magnificent Butcher, Kwan's Wong Fei-hung saves the main villain (played by Lee Hoi-san) from being killed by Butcher Wing (Sammo Hung). This reflected Wong Fei-hung's portrayal in the original films, wherein he would defeat the villain but then heal him.

Kwan became so associated with the mature Wong Fei-hung that other filmmakers would only portray the character as a younger person, including Jackie Chan playing Wong as a young man in Drunken Master (1978), and Yuen Woo-ping depicting Wong as a child (played by actress Angie Tsang) in Iron Monkey (1993). When Jet Li portrayed Wong in the Once Upon a Time in China series, many Chinese viewers felt he was too young.

== Filmography ==
- The Guangzhou Adventure of the Fearless (1947)
- One-Eye Dragon Strange Hero (1947)
- Bloody Cloth (1948)
- Fishing Village in the War (1948)
- A Sword to Save a Country (1949)
- A Woman's Heart is Never Mended (1949)
- The Lady Protector and the Knight with the Whip (1949)
- Story of Huang Feihong (Part 1) (1949)
- Story of Huang Feihong (Part 2) (1949)
- Xue Rengui's Bloody Battle at Liu Village (1950)
- The Story of Huang Feihung Part 3: Battle by Liuhua Bridge (1950)
- The Story of Huang Feihong Part 4: Death of Liang Huan (1950)
- Story of Huang Feihong (Part 5) (1951)
- The Silver World of Stardom (1951)
- The Five Heroes' Deadly Spears (1951)
- The Brave Archer (1951)
- Soul of the Tiger (1952)
- How Huang Feihong Defeated 3 Bullies with a Single Rod (1953)
- Brother in Bloodshed (1954)
- Huang Feihong Tries His Shadowless Kick (1954)
- Story of Huang Feihong and Lin Shirong (1954)
- The Boxer of Nanhai (1954)
- The True Story of Huang Feihong (1955)
- The Story of Huang Feihong (2nd Sequel) (1955)
- Story of Iron Monkey (Grand Finale) (1955)
- Huang Feihong's Rival for the Fireworks (1955)
- Huang Feihong's Victory at Fourth Gate (1955)
- How Huang Feihong Vanquished the Bully on Long Dike (1955)
- Huang Feihong at a Boxing Match (1956)
- Huang Feihong's Fight in Foshan (1956)
- How Huang Feihong Set Fire to Dashatou (1956)
- Huang Feihong and the Courtesan's Boat Argument (1956)
- Huang Feihong's Battle at Shuangmendi (1956)
- Huang Feihong and the Lantern Festival Disturbance (1956)
- How Huang Feihong Pitted 7 Lions against the Dragon (1956)
- How Huang Feihong Fought 5 Dragons Single-handed (1956)
- How Huang Feihong Thrice Tricked the Girl Bodyguard (1956)
- How Huang Feihong Saved the Dragon's Mother's Temple (1956)
- Huang Feihong's 7 Battles with the Fiery Unicorn (1956)
- How Huang Feihong Vanquished the 12 Tigers (1956)
- How Huang Feihong Conquered the Two Tigers (1956)
- How Huang Feihong Pitted a Lion against the Unicorn (1956)
- Huang Feihong's Story: Iron Cock against Centpede (1956)
- Huang Feihong Wins the Dragon Boat Race (1956)
- How Huang Feihong Thrice Captured Su Shulian in the Water (1956)
- How Huang Feihong Vanquished the Terrible Hound at Shamian (1956)
- Huang Feihong's Victory at Xiaobeijiang (1956)
- How Huang Feihong Vanquished the Bully at the Red Opera Float (1956)
- The Princess is Kidnapped (1956)
- Heroine of Deadly Darts (1956)
- Huang Feihong Rescues the Fishmonger (1956)
- Huang Feihong's Battle at Mountain Goddess of Mercy (1956)
- Huang Feihong Attends the Joss-Stick Festival at Heavenly Goddess' Temple (1956)
- Wu Song's Bloody Fight on Lion's Bower (1956)
- Huang Feihong Goes to a Birthday Party at Guanshan (1956)
- How Huang Feihong Saved the Lovelorn Monk from the Ancient Monastery (1956)
- The Life of Zuo Song (1956)
- Chang E's Flight to the Moon (1956)
- The White Crane Heroes (1956)
- General Kwan Seduced by Diaochan Under Moonlight (1956)
- Ne-Zha's Adventures in the East Sea (1957)
- Devil's Sword (1957)
- Huang Feihong's Fight at Henan (1957)
- Huang Feihong's Three Battles with the Unruly Girl (1957)
- How Huang Feihong Spied on Black Dragon Hill at Night (1957)
- How the Boxer from Nanhai Stole the Dappled Horse at Night (1957)
- Huang Feihong's Battle with the Lion King (1957)
- Huang Feihong and the Battle of Saddle Hill (1957)
- The War between Chu and Han (1957)
- How Huang Feihong Smashed the Flying Dagger Gang (1957)
- The Flag Which Conquered 7 Provinces (1957)
- How Huang Feihong Fought a Bloody Battle in the Spinster's Home (1957)
- World of Fist (1957)
- Knife in Fish-gut (1957)
- Huang Feihu's Rebellion (1957)
- Ne Zha's Adventures in the Heavenly Palace (1957)
- Fifteen Strings of Coins (1957)
- General Guan Escorts His Brother's Wife on a 1,000 Mile Journey (1957)
- Huang Feihong's Rival for a Pearl (1957)
- Huang Feihong's Story: Five Devils against Two Dragons (1958)
- Huang Feihu's Rebellion (2nd sequel) (1958)
- Lest We Forget (1958 film)|Lest We Forget (1958)
- Fan Lihua Bears a Son in the Golden-Light Militia (1958)
- How Xue Gang Smashed the Temple (1958)
- Huang Feihong's Fierce Battle (1958)
- How Huang Feihong Erases the Golden Bell Trap (1958)
- Huanf Feihong Seizes the Bride at Xiguan (1958)
- How Huang Feihong Stormed Phoenix Hill (1958)
- Massacre of the Innocents (1958)
- Huang Feihong's Battle with the Bullies in the Boxing Ring (1958)
- Huang Feihong's Victory at Ma Village (1958)
- Huang Feihong Gets Rid of the Three Rascals (1958)
- How Huang Feihong Used an Iron-Fowl Against the Eagle (1958)
- Huang Feihohng Saves the Kidnapped Liang Kuan (1958)
- The Flying Prince (1958)
- Three Attempts to Steal the Cup of the Nine Dragons (1959)
- The Rascal He on Fire (1959)
- Huang Feihong on Rainbow Bridge (1959)
- Shattering the Copper Net Array (1959)
- Seven Heroes Spy on Chongxiao Bower (1959)
- King Kong's Adventures in the Heavely Palace (1959)
- How Wen Tianxiang Thrice Tricked Grand Sire Wen (1959)
- White Lady's Reincarnation (1959)
- Huang Feihong Trapped in the Hell (1959)
- How Huang Feihong Defeated the Tiger on the Opera Stage (1959)
- Huang Feihong's Combat in the Boxing Ring (1960)
- How Na Zha Rescued His Mother from the Snake Mountain (1960)
- Huang Feihong's Battle with the Gorilla (1960)
- The Strange Hero Conquered the Dragon (1960)
- Two Orphans Conquered the Dragon at Tianshan (1960)
- Tao Lung Fighting against Fin Kum Kong (1960)
- How Huang Feihong Smashed the Five Tigers (1961)
- The Invincible Iron Fan (1961)
- Killing of the Villains (1961)
- Huang Feihong Meeting the Heroes with the Tiger Paw (1967) (also writer)
- Huang Feihong: The Incredible Success in Canton (1968)
- Huang Feihong: The Invincible 'Lion Dancer' (1968)
- Huang Feihong: The Eight Bandits (1968)
- The Magic Whip (1968)
- Huang Feihong: The Duel Against the Black Rascal (1968)
- Huang Feihong: Duel for the Championship (1968)
- Huang Feihong: The Duel for the 'Sha-yu-qing' (1969)
- Huang Feihong: The Conqueror of the 'Sam-hong Gang' (1969)
- Huang Feihong's Combat with the Five Wolves (1969)
- Huang Feihong in Sulphur Valley (1969)
- Huang Fei Hong: Bravely Crushing the Fire Formation (1970)
- The Skyhawk (1974)
- Magnificent Butcher (1979)
- The Magnificent Kick (1980)
- Dreadnaught (1981)
- Aces Go Places 4 (1986)
- The Family Strikes Back (1986)
- It's a Wonderful Life (1994)
- Cinema of Vengeance (1994 UK documentary) - Himself - Interviewee

== See also ==
- Wong Fei-hung filmography
