= Story of Drunken Master =

1979 Hong Kong film by Ngai Hoi-fung and Wu Pang

- Directed by: Ngai Hoi-fung; Wu Pang
- Written by: Ngai Hoi-fung; Leung Cho
- Produced by: Si Chiu-yam
- Starring: Simon Yuen; Sharon Yeung; Wang Ho; Yen Shi-kwan; Yuen Lung-kui; Cheung Wa; San Kuai; Chui San-yee; Fung Ging-man; Shek Tin
- Cinematography: Tsui Hsin-yu
- Distributed by: Golden Tripod
- Release date: 7 June 1979
- Running time: 90 minutes
- Country: Hong Kong
- Languages: Cantonese; Mandarin

Story of Drunken Master (Chinese: 醉俠蘇乞兒 aka Zui xia Su Qi Er / Drunken Fist Boxing) is a 1979 Hong Kong kung fu comedy film directed by Ngai Hoi-fung and Wu Pang. The film stars Simon Yuen, Sharon Yeung, Wang Ho, Yen Shi-kwan, Cheung Wa, San Kuai, Chui San-yee, Fung Ging-man, and Shek Tin. The film was released theatrically in Hong Kong on 7 June 1979.

== Plot ==
Beggar So is trying to pass on his kung fu to a brother and sister team together with mixed style. A past enemy of Beggar So, Grasshopper Bill Chan and his brother Cougar start causing trouble for him and causing him to be thrown out of his house. Grasshopper Bill helps Kai to be pledged in marriage to Gam Fa against her wishes, but secretly he wants to keep her all to himself, which leads to the final death battle.

== Cast ==
- Simon Yuen as Beggar So
- Sharon Yeung as Gam Fa
- Wang Ho as Chi Wai
- Yen Shi-kwan as Grasshopper Bill Chan
- Yuen Lung-kui as Chong, Beggar So's son
- Cheung Wa as Kie
- San Kuai as Cougar
- Chui San-yee as Uncle Yeung
- Fung Ging-man as Uncle Kau (Nine)
- Shek Tin as Little Master

== See also ==
- Lists of Hong Kong films
