= Drunken Master =

1978 Hong Kong film by Yuen Woo-ping

- Theatrical release poster

Chinese name
- Traditional Chinese: 醉拳
Transcriptions
Yue: Cantonese
- Jyutping: Zeoi3 Kyun4
- Directed by: Yuen Woo-ping
- Written by: Siao Lung; Ng See-yuen
- Produced by: Ng See-yuen
- Starring: Jackie Chan; Yuen Siu-tien; Hwang Jang-lee; Dean Shek
- Cinematography: Chang Hui
- Edited by: Pan Hsiung
- Music by: Chow Fu-liang
- Distributed by: Seasonal Film Corporation
- Release date: 5 October 1978
- Running time: 110 minutes
- Country: Hong Kong
- Language: Cantonese
- Box office: US$16.5 million (est.)

Drunken Master (Chinese: 醉拳; lit. 'Drunken Fist and Jui Kuen'), also known as Drunken Master The Beginning, is a 1978 Hong Kong martial arts comedy film directed by Yuen Woo-ping and produced and co-written by Ng See-yuen. The film features much of the same crew as Yuen's Snake in the Eagle's Shadow released earlier the same year, including lead actors Jackie Chan, Yuen Siu-tien (Woo-ping's father), and Hwang Jang-lee; although narratively unrelated, Drunken Master bears similarities to its predecessor in its story and style.

Drunken Master features Chan and Yuen Siu-tien as fictionalized versions of martial artists Wong Fei-hung and Beggar So; in the film, Wong is an irreverent young man forced under the fierce tutelage of So, master of the drunken fighting style; although the two do not originally get along, Wong eventually gains humility and respect for So.

Considered an early milestone of martial arts comedy and one of the best films in the genre, the film was a large box-office success, earning two and a half times the revenue of the already-successful Snake in the Eagle's Shadow; it had a significant cultural impact, inspiring numerous later films, music, manga, anime and video games with its depictions of teacher-student relationship and the drunken style, and helped establish Chan as one of Asia's most popular actors. The film was followed by two sequels directed by Lau Kar-leung in 1994: the direct sequel Drunken Master II, in which Chan reprised his role, and the mostly-unrelated Drunken Master III. Drunken Master would be Yuen Siu-tien's final film released during his lifetime, although he would portray Beggar So again in several films released posthumously, including the Drunken Master spin-off Dance of the Drunk Mantis (1979), also directed by Woo-ping.

== Plot ==
Wong Fei-hung (sometimes dubbed as "Freddie Wong") is a young and mischievous son, who runs into a series of troubles. Firstly, he teaches an overbearing assistant martial arts teacher a lesson, and later makes advances on a woman to impress his friends. He is consequently thrashed by her older female guardian. His shame is compounded when these two are later revealed to be his visiting aunt and cousin, whom he had not met before. Lastly, he beats up a hooligan, who turns out to be the son of an influential man in town. His father decides to punish him for his behavior by making him train harder in martial arts. Wong's father arranges for Beggar So to train his son in martial arts.

Beggar So has a reputation for crippling his students during training so Wong flees from home in an attempt to escape his punishment. Penniless, Wong stops at a restaurant and tries to trick a fellow patron into offering him a free meal. As Wong was about to leave after his meal, he discovers that the man is actually the owner of the restaurant. He fights with the owner's lackeys in an attempt to escape. An old drunkard nearby is drawn into the fight and helps him escape. The drunkard turns out to be Beggar So (who is known in some versions of the film as Sam Seed, So-Hi or Su Hua-chi), the Drunken Master. Beggar So forces Wong into his brutal and rigorous training programme, but he flees again to avoid the torturous training and runs into the notorious killer Yim Tit-sam (known in some versions as Thunderfoot or Thunderleg) by accident.

Yim is known for his "Devil's Kick", a swift and deadly kicking style which has never been defeated. Wong provokes and challenges him to a fight and is soundly defeated and humiliated. He makes his way back to Beggar So and decides to commit himself to the Drunken Master's training program. The training resumes and soon Wong learns Beggar So's secret style of martial arts, a form of Drunken Boxing called "The Eight Drunken Immortals", named after the eight xian that the fighting style references. Wong masters seven of the eight styles with the exception of Drunken Miss Ho's as he feels that her style of fighting is too feminine.

Meanwhile, Yim Tit-sam is contracted by a business rival to kill Wong's father. Wong's father fights with Yim and is defeated and injured by him. Wong and Beggar So arrive on time and Wong continues the fight with Yim. Beggar So promises not to interfere in the fight. Wong employs the new skills he has learned and outmatches Yim's kicking style. Yim then resorts to his secret technique, the Devil's Shadowless Hand, which is too fast for Wong to defeat. Wong confesses that he did not master the last style so Beggar So tells him to combine the seven styles and create his own version of the last style. Wong follows the instruction and discovers his own unique style of Drunken Miss Ho, which he uses to overcome the Shadowless Hand and finally defeats Yim.

== Background ==
The film's protagonist Wong Fei-hung was a Chinese martial artist, a traditional Chinese medicine practitioner and a revolutionary who lived towards the end of the Qing dynasty. He became a Chinese folk hero and the subject of several Hong Kong television programmes and films. Beggar So, who plays a supporting role in the film, is also another character from Chinese folklore and one of the Ten Tigers of Canton. The Beggar So character is often cast as an associate of Wong Fei-hung or Wong's uncle.

== Cast ==
- Jackie Chan as Wong Fei-hung / Freddy Wong (UK version) (voiced by Tang Wing-Hung)
- Yuen Siu-Tin (or Simon Yuen) as Beggar So / Su Hua Chi / Sam Seed
- Hwang Jang-lee as Thunderleg Yen Tie Hsin / Yim Tit-sam / Thunderfoot
- Dean Shek as Professor Kai-Hsin
- Lam Kau as Wong Kei-Ying / Wong Chi-Ying / Robert Wong (UK version)
- Fung King-man as Mr. Lee Man-ho
- Hsu Hsia as King of Bamboo Hsu Ching-tien
- Linda Lin as Wong Fei-hung's aunt
- Yuen Shun-yi as Chan Kwok-wai / Charlie Wei
- Tong Jing as Wong Fei-hung's cousin
- Tino Wong as Jerry Lee
- Yuen Woo-Ping as Man with bucket of greens

== Fight scenes and martial arts ==
A number of notable fights are featured in the film, almost all of them with strong elements of comedy—from the game of Keep Away with Wong Kei-ying's cocky, but incompetent, assistant kung fu instructor, to the novel "head-fu" fighting style used by one of his opponents. The film features the Hung Ga system of fighting, which was historically practiced by Wong Fei-hung and his father Wong Kei-ying, both of whom are major characters in the film. The animal styles of Snake, Crane, and Tiger performed in the film are derived wholly from the Hung Ga system and bear only a tangential relationship to the Fujian White Crane, Lama Pai (Tibetan White Crane), Black Tiger, and Snake systems of kung fu. Monkey style kung fu, popular in Southern Chinese martial arts performances, is also shown briefly.

Numerous systems of kung fu include "Drunken Boxing" forms (e.g. Choi Lei Fut and Drunken Monkey), and the Taoist Eight Immortals are popular staples of Chinese culture and art. However, the "Eight Drunken Immortals" forms depicted in this film are likely the creation of director and choreographer Yuen Woo-ping and based on routines found in other systems.

The primary villain in Drunken Master is played by Hwang Jang-lee, a Korean martial artist specialising in Taekwondo and known for his high-flying kicks, which are prominently displayed in the film. The systems of "Devil's Kick" and "Devil's Shadowless Hands" employed by Thunderleg are entirely fictitious.

According to his book I Am Jackie Chan: My Life in Action, Chan nearly lost an eye after his brow ridge was injured.

== Theme song ==
The theme song of Drunken Master is based on a Chinese folk song, "Under the General's Orders". Since Drunken Master, the theme song has been popularly associated with the folk hero Wong Fei-hung, who Jackie Chan plays in the film. It was later used in the 1983 film Winners and Sinners, starring Sammo Hung; it was played in a market scene whilst the Five Lucky Stars are watching two men demonstrating the beneficial effects of their medicines and their martial arts stances, in reference to Wong Fei-hung. "Under the General's Orders" later become the main theme song for the Once Upon a Time in China series starring Jet Li, who also plays Wong Fei-hung.

== Box office ==
At the Hong Kong box office, Drunken Master earned an impressive HK$6,763,793 (US$1,445,255). It was the second most popular film in Hong Kong in 1978 behind the Hui brothers' The Contract and third on the all-time list.

In Japan, where it released on 21 July 1979, it became one of the year's top ten highest-grossing films, earning ¥1.9 billion (US$8.7 million). In South Korea, it was the highest-grossing film of 1979, with 898,561 box admissions in Seoul City, equivalent to an estimated ₩1,347,842,000 (US$2,784,800). The film also broke records in Malaysia and Singapore.

In Germany, where it was released as Sie nannten ihn Knochenbrecher ("They Called Him Bone Breaker") on 25 July 1980, it was the 41st highest-grossing film of the year, selling 584,312 tickets, equivalent to an estimated €1,460,780 (US$2,063,606). In Spain, the film sold 823,203 tickets, equivalent to an estimated €1,070,164 (US$1,489,989).

Combined, the film grossed an estimated total of approximately US$16,483,650 (equivalent to $81,000,000 in 2025) in East Asia and Europe.

== Sequels and spinoffs ==
- Drunken Master II (1994) stars Jackie Chan, and is considered the only official sequel. Chan portrays the same character, Wong Fei-hung. The US release of the film in 2000 was entitled The Legend of Drunken Master. In 2021, the film was released again in the United States on Blu-ray as part of the Warner Archive Collection under its original title with previously censored content added back into the film.
- In 1979, Yuen Siu-Tin reprised the role of Beggar So in the film Dance of the Drunk Mantis, which is entitled Drunken Master Part 2 (not to be confused with the film Drunken Master II referenced above) in some releases. The film, which was again directed by his son, Yuen Woo-Ping, does not feature Jackie Chan, focusing instead on the drunken beggar character rather than on Wong Fei-hung. It is therefore generally considered to be a spinoff rather than a true sequel.
- Yuen played this same role again in the films Story of Drunken Master and World of the Drunken Master.

== Imitators ==
As with several successful Hong Kong action films, a number of films were released in the wake of Drunken Master (and its sequel) that could be considered to trade on the fame of the original films. These had less in common with the original films than the spinoffs starring Yuen Siu-tien. They include:

- 5 Superfighters (aka The Drunken Fighter) (1978)
- Drunken Swordsman (aka Drunken Dragon Strikes Back) (1979)
- Drunken Arts and Crippled Fist (Featuring Li Yi Min) (1979)
- Drunken Master, Slippery Snake (Starring Cliff Lok) (1979)
- Shaolin Drunken Monkey (Starring Elton Chong) (1981)
- The Shaolin Drunken Monk (starring Gordon Liu) (1982)
- Drunken Tai Chi (directed by Yuen Woo-ping and starring Donnie Yen) (1984)
- Revenge of the Drunken Master (1984), starring Johnny Chan, whose name allowed him to trade off his more successful namesake in other low-budget martial arts films including Golden Dragon, Silver Snake (1979) and The Eagles Killer (1978)
- Drunken Master III (aka Drunken Master Killer) – starring Andy Lau (1994)
- The Little Drunken Masters (1995)

Not all films that feature the Zui Quan "Drunken Fist" style (or variations on it) can be considered as imitators of the Drunken Master films. Films such as Drunken Monkey (2002) may feature a drunken style of kung fu, and in the case of The Forbidden Kingdom (2008), the same principal star, but they have a fundamentally different plot and sufficiently different title to separate them from Drunken Master.

== Home media ==
- On 24 April 2000, Hong Kong Legends released a DVD in the United Kingdom. The image is cropped from 2:35:1 to 1.78:1 and has the Mandarin soundtrack with dubtitles. However, it has a number of additional features including a deleted scene and an interview with producer Ng See-yuen.
- On 2 April 2002, Columbia TriStar Home Video and Destination Films released a DVD in the United States. Despite a 2:35:1 image and the inclusion of the original Cantonese track, the audio is incomplete in some sections (reverting to the English dub) and contains dubtitles. There's an audio commentary by Ric Meyers and Jeff Yang.
- On 18 March 2004, HKVideo released a "Wong Fei Hung" DVD boxset in France containing this film (French title: "Le maître chinois") and two others. It contains a full 2:35:1 image and the Cantonese soundtrack. However, it contains slightly poorer image quality and no English subtitles.
- On 30 April 2004, Mei Ah Entertainment released a remastered DVD in Hong Kong. It contains a 2:35:1 image, Cantonese Dolby Digital 5.1 track, original Cantonese Dolby Digital 2.0 mono track and Mandarin Dolby Digital 2.0 mono track. Subtitles include Traditional Chinese, Simplified Chinese and English. The missing Cantonese for the opening has been re-dubbed in Cantonese and the other missing Cantonese scenes as extended footage in Mandarin due to trouble of re-dubbing with new voice actors. Many short lines missing Cantonese had been removed. Special features include Extended footage, accessed during the film by selecting the wine jug icon when it appears on the right top corner, Mastering the Drunken Master, a 35-second music video with clips of Jackie Chan practicing the 8 Drunken Gods from the film, film synopsis and cast & crew.
- PanMedia released a bootleg DVD that contains the complete Cantonese track.

== Cultural impact ==
=== Fashion ===
- During the late 1970s to early 1980s, Jackie Chan's shoulder-length hairstyle in Drunken Master became popular across Asia, widely adopted by both men and women across the region.

=== Film ===
In 2017, it was ranked number 3 on GamesRadar's list of 50 greatest kung fu movies of all time.

- Edgar Wright's The World's End (2013) had drunken pub fight scenes inspired by Drunken Master. The film's fight scenes were choreographed by Brad Allan, who was part of the Jackie Chan Stunt Team during the 1990s to 2000s.

=== Manga and anime ===
- Manga author Akira Toriyama cited Drunken Master as one of his major inspirations for the Dragon Ball series of shōnen manga and anime, along with Bruce Lee's Enter the Dragon (1973) and the Chinese novel Journey to the West. Toriyama said that he would never have come up with Dragon Ball if he had not watched Drunken Master, and he was drawn to its more light-hearted tone. Drunken Master also served as a reference for the training scenes. The series pays homage to Drunken Master when the first tournament is held, where Kame-Sennin (Master Roshi) is disguised as "Jackie Chun" and he tries to use a Drunken Fist technique on Son Goku (Goku).
- In the Naruto series, the character Rock Lee is seen performing similar fighting styles after consuming alcohol. Known as the 'Drunken Fist' in the series' Japanese version and the 'Loopy Fist' in the English.

=== Music ===
- Jamaican musicians Sly Dunbar, Robbie Shakespeare, and The Revolutionaries recorded a reggae song titled "Drunken Master" that was released by Island on the album Sly and Robbie Present Taxi in 1981.
- UK dubstep artist FuntCase used speech samples taken from the film in his song "Half drunk".

=== Video games ===
- The PlayStation game Jackie Chan Stuntmaster includes a bonus level in which he wears his traditional Drunken Master dress and drinks wine while fighting. He even gives the Drunken Punch as his charge punch throughout the game.
- In popular PC online game Guild Wars, there is a stance-skill called "Drunken Master" which temporarily increases movement and attack speed. This effect is doubled if character is drunk.
- In Fallout Tactics: Brotherhood of Steel, there is a perk called "Drunken Master" which temporarily increases Unarmed skill while under the effects of alcohol.
- In The King of Fighters series, the character Chin Gentsai was modeled after Su Hua Chi.
- The Tekken video game series features a character named Lei Wu Long, a Hong Kong detective based on Jackie Chan's Police Story films. While the character was originally nicknamed Supercop after the film Police Story 3: Supercop Lei Wu Long uses 5 to 6+ stances which have all of Jackie Chan's signature film moves. Initially in the series it focused on the Snake style he created for Snake in The Eagle's Shadow. In Street Fighter X Tekken released in 2012, Lei Wulong's "Ultimate Stance" is "Drunken Fist" based on his performance in the 1978 original and the 1994 sequel.
- The Dead or Alive video game franchise features a playable character named Brad Wong; a drunken wanderer introduced in Dead or Alive 3 who specializes in the zui quan fighting style and was taught by a non-playable character named Chen.
- The Mortal Kombat video game franchise introduced Bo' Rai Cho in Mortal Kombat: Deadly Alliance; his name is a play on the word "borracho" (Spanish for "drunk"), and he is indeed usually depicted as intoxicated, and carrying a canister of alcohol. His fighting moves consist of drunken style fighting mixed with vulgar actions.

== See also ==
- Jackie Chan filmography
- List of Hong Kong films
- List of martial arts films
