= T'ien Hsia Monthly =

English-language magazine

- Chinese: 天下月刊
Transcriptions
Standard Mandarin
- Hanyu Pinyin: Tiānxià Yuèkān
- Wade–Giles: T'ien-hsia Yüeh-k'an
Yue: Cantonese
- Jyutping: tin1 haa6 jyut6 hon1*2

T'ien Hsia Monthly (Chinese: 天下月刊; "T'ien Hsia" meaning "everything under heaven") was a monthly English-language magazine published in Shanghai from August 1935 to 1937 and in Hong Kong from 1937 to 1941. The editors of the magazine were ethnic Chinese, including editor-in-chief Wen Yuan-ning. Contributors included C. R. Boxer, Chuan Tsen-kuo, William Empson, Emily Hahn, Lin Yutang, Shao Xunmei (Zau Sinmay), and John C.H. Wu. The magazine's purpose was to include works from Chinese writers introducing China to the west and works from Western writers discussing their ideas about China. The Sun Yat-sen Institute for the Advancement of Culture and Education supported the publication. Kelly & Walsh was the magazine's printer.

Jonathan Hutt in China Heritage Quarterly described several of the contributors as being "China’s intellectual and literary stars." Ian Gill of the South China Morning Post stated that the magazine's editors, writers, and contributors were known for living liberal lifestyles. The China Heritage Quarterly stated that the magazine "reflected a positive relationship between the patriotic aspirations of some members of a Western-educated intelligentsia and a generous spirit of cosmopolitanism."

== History ==
Wen Yuan-ning and Louise Mary Newman established the magazine together after Newman, at age 19, arrived in Shanghai. Wen, of Southeast Asian Chinese origins and educated in Singapore and the United Kingdom, had previously taught English literature at Peking University and Tsinghua University, and after moving to Shanghai became a contributing editor to the English-language weekly The China Critic. Newman, a Chinese woman originally from Changsha, had been adopted by a British man, Frank Newman, and his Chinese wife, Mei-lan, after her biological parents abandoned her. Called "Marylou" by her father and "Billie" by her friends, she was educated in British international schools in Shanghai and previously worked at Reuters. Wen hired her after she responded to an advert for his publication.

A flat on Yuyuan Road in Shanghai, not in the city's main commercial district, housed the T'en Hsia offices. Newman became known as the magazine's "backroom girl" as she edited and proofread the publication and liaised with the printer; she worked on the publication until its end. Newman later married Irishman Arthur "Paddy" Gill, a warrant officer of the Army of the United Kingdom, on January 31, 1940 and took his family name.

The staffers moved to Hong Kong in circa 1937 due to the Japanese invasion of Shanghai as part of the Second Sino-Japanese War. While in Hong Kong the publication's offices were at the Hongkong and Shanghai Bank building in Central. The publication ceased production after the Japanese invasion of Hong Kong on December 8, 1941. Louise Mary Gill was captured and put in an internment camp, while the editors escaped to the area known as "Free China".
