= John Ching Hsiung Wu =

Chinese jurist and author

- 吳經熊
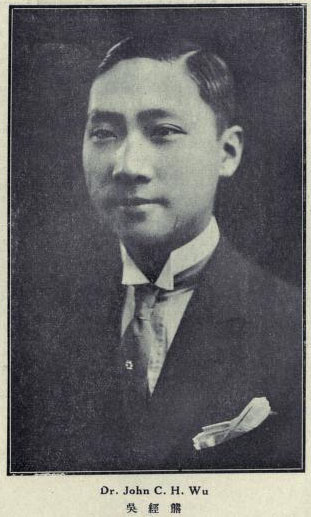
- Born: March 28, 1899; Ningbo, Qing China
- Died: February 6, 1986 (aged 86)
- Education: Shanghai Baptist College; Peiyang University; Soochow University; University of Michigan (JD)
- Occupations: Jurist, Author
- Writing career
- Genres: Law, Catholicism, Tang poetry

John Ching Hsiung Wu (also John C. H. Wu; traditional Chinese: 吳經熊; pinyin: Wu Jingxiong; March 28, 1899 – February 6, 1986) was a Chinese intellectual, jurist, and writer. He wrote works mainly in Chinese and English on jurisprudence, philosophy of law, Chinese literature, philosophy and religion, and Christian spirituality. He translated Chinese classics into English and the Psalms and the New Testament into literary Chinese. His works have been translated into about fifteen languages. A convert to Catholicism, he served as ambassador of the Republic of China to the Holy See and taught at several universities.

== Biography ==
Born in 1899 in Ningbo, Zhejiang, in a traditional Chinese family, Wu began his education with a private Confucian tutor in 1905. From 1908 to 1911, Wu attended elementary school. From 1911, in addition to his classical education, he studied English and natural sciences.

In 1916, he married Li Youti. In the same year, he attended the Shanghai Baptist College, where he befriended the future poet and writer Xu Zhimo, with whom he enrolled in the Law School of the National Peiyang University in Tianjin in the winter of 1916. In September 1917, Wu and Xu enrolled in the Law School of Soochow University, founded by American Methodist missionaries in 1900. In the winter, he was baptized as a Methodist. In 1918, his first son was born. In June 1920, Wu obtained a Bachelor of Laws.

In August 1920, Wu entered the University of Michigan Law School to study international and comparative law, where he received the Doctor of Law in June 1921. In March 1921, Wu published his first paper, "Readings from Ancient Chinese Codes." In the same year, he began a correspondence with U.S. Supreme Court Justice Oliver Wendell Holmes, Jr.

In 1921, Wu received a scholarship to the University of Paris and in 1922 to the University of Berlin, studying law with neo-Kantian legal philosopher Rudolf Stammler. In 1923, Wu received a scholarship from Harvard Law School.

In the fall of 1924, Wu began teaching law at the Comparative Law School of Soochow University. In January 1927, Wu was appointed a judge of the Shanghai Provisional Court, which handled international cases. In April 1927, Wu was appointed dean of the School of Comparative Law. In 1928, he published his first book, Essays and Legal Studies. In August 1928, he was appointed Acting President of the Shanghai Provisional Court.

In December 1929, Wu was invited to deliver the Rosenthal Lectures at the Northwestern University Law School in Chicago. In 1930, he received a scholarship from Harvard Law School. He was also invited to lecture in Comparative Law by the same university, but due to his wife's health, Wu had to return to Shanghai.

In 1930, Wu declined the offer of a judgeship in the Supreme Court of the Nationalist Government of China and began to practice law privately. In 1931, he was appointed as a councilor to the Shanghai Municipal Council. In January 1933, he entered the Legislative Yuan, leaving his practice of law. He became Vice President of the Commission for the Drafting of the Constitution of the Republic of China led by Sun Fo, son of Sun Yat-sen.

In 1935, with Lin Yutang, Wen Yuanning and Quan Zenggu, he founded the English-language magazine T’ien Hsia Monthly, mainly focused on Chinese literature.

In 1937, after a long period of spiritual struggle, he entered the Catholic Church, receiving conditional baptism in the chapel of Aurora University in Shanghai. His reading of the biography of Saint Thérèse of Lisieux The Story of a Soul was decisive for his conversion.

In January 1938, due to the Second Sino-Japanese War, Wu fled with his family to Hong Kong. In January 1940, thanks to the miraculous healing of his daughter of just over a year old, attributed to the intercession of Thérèse of Lisieux, his entire family converted to Catholicism. He dedicated to the Saint his essay The Science of Love, which was translated into about fifteen languages.

In June 1942, to escape the Japanese, Wu took refuge with his family in Guilin, where he began the translation of the Book of Psalms into literary Chinese, commissioned by Chiang Kai-shek. This translation was followed by that of the New Testament. In the winter of 1944, Wu moved with his family to Chongqing. From April 25 to June 26, 1945, Wu participated as a Chinese advisor to the United Nations Conference on International Organization in San Francisco. In the same year, he moved to Shanghai. In September 1946, Wu was appointed Minister Plenipotentiary of the Embassy of the Republic of China to the Holy See. In January 1947, he moved to Rome with his family until June 1949.

In July 1949, Wu moved to Honolulu as a visiting professor of Chinese philosophy and literature at the Department of Religion affiliated with the University of Hawaii. Between 1950 and 1951 he wrote his autobiography, Beyond East and West, which was translated into several languages. In the fall of 1951, Wu was appointed professor at the Seton Hall University Law School in New Jersey. In 1953 he published a book on Christian spirituality, The Interior Carmel, and in 1955 a book on natural law, Fountain of Justice. In 1957, Wu represented the Republic of China at the Permanent Court of Arbitration in The Hague, Netherlands. In 1958, he published the textbook Cases and Materials on Jurisprudence. In 1959, his wife Teresa died after a sudden illness. They had 14 children.

In 1961, he published his English translation of the Chinese classic Daodejing. In the fall of 1961, Wu began teaching at the Institute of Far Eastern Studies at Seton Hall University. In 1963, he published a collection of poems written in his own handwriting in memory of his late wife. In the 1960s, Wu became friends with the Japanese scholar of Zen Buddhism D. T. Suzuki and the American Trappist monk and writer Thomas Merton, with whom he exchanged many letters. In 1965, Merton dedicated his book The Way of Chuang Tzu to Wu. In the same year, Wu published Chinese Humanism and Christian Spirituality. From the fall of 1966, Wu taught a year-long course on Zen at the College of Chinese Culture in Taipei. In 1967, he published The Golden Age of Zen.

In June 1967, he married Agnes Zhu Wenyin in Taipei, where he moved permanently in the fall of 1968. He was appointed Professor, Permanent Honorary President, and President of the Doctoral Program of the Department of Philosophy at the College of Chinese Culture. In April 1969, Wu was elected to the Central Committee of the Kuomintang, and in 1971, he was appointed Senior Advisor to the President. In 1971, he published Sun Yat-sen: The Man and His Ideas, and in 1972, The Four Seasons of T'ang Poetry. In 1975, he published a spiritual profile of Chiang Kai-shek. In August 1979, he submitted the original manuscript of his translation of the New Testament and Psalms to the Collection of the Kuomintang History Committee. During these years he edited publications of collections and translations of his essays into Chinese.

On February 6, 1986, after a long illness, Wu died in Taipei at the age of 87. His solemn funeral was celebrated by over eighty priests and bishops. It was attended by dignitaries, the presidential guard and the military band, with the national flag draped over the coffin. He is buried in the Catholic cemetery in Taipei.

== Works by John C. H. Wu ==
- Juridical Essays and Studies (Shanghai: Commercial Press, 1928)
- The Legal Systems of Old and New China: A Comparison (Chicago, 1930)
- 法律哲學研究 (Shanghai: 上海法學編譯社, 1933)
- The Art of Law and Other Essays Juridical and Literary (Shanghai: Commercial Press, 1936)
- 約法釋義 (con 金鳴盛) (Shanghai: 會文堂新記書局, 1936)
- The Science of Love: A Study of the Teachings of Therese of Lisieux (Hong Kong: Catholic Truth Society, 1940)
- Gedanken während des Haareschneidens (Vienna: Amandus-Edition, 1946)
- Du Confucianisme au Catholicisme (Roma: Pontificia Università Gregoriana, 1948)
- Dom Lou: Sa vie spirituelle (Bruges: Desclée De Brouwer, 1949)
- Beyond East and West (New York: Sheed and Ward, 1951)
- The Interior Carmel: The Threefold Way of Love (New York: Sheed & Ward, 1953)
- Fountain of Justice: A Study in the Natural Law (New York: Sheed and Ward, 1955)
- Justice Holmes: A New Estimate (Philadelphia: Brandeis Lawyers Society, 1957)
- Cases and Materials on Jurisprudence (St. Paul: West Publishing, 1958)
- 懷蘭集 (Taizhong: 光啟出版社, 1963)
- Chinese Humanism and Christian Spirituality (New York: St. John University Press, 1965)
- 中西文化論集 (et al.) (Taipei: 國防研究院/中華大典編印會, 1966)
- The Golden Age of Zen (Taipei: National War College, 1967)
- 中西文化之比較 (Taipei: 新中國出版社, 1968)
- Sun Yat-sen: The Man and His Ideas (Taipei: Commercial Press, 1971)
- 哲學與文化 (Taipei: 三民書局, 1971)
- The Four Seasons of T'ang Poetry (Tokyo: Charles E. Tuttle, 1972)
- 蔣總統的精神生活 (Taipei: 華欣文化事業中心, 1975)
- Jurisprudence: A Treatise, Richly Illustrated with Cases and Readings (Taipei: Hwakang Bookstore, 1976)
- 中國法學論著選集 (ed. by 刁榮華) (Taipei: 漢林出版社, 1976)
- 法學論文選譯集 Essays on Legal and Political Philosophy (ed. da 洪玉欽) (Taipei: 中國文化學院, 1978)
- Joy in Chinese Philosophy (Taipei: National Chengchi University, 1979)
- 法律哲學研究 (ed. da 許章潤) (Beijing: 清華大學出版社, 2003)
- 吳經熊裁判集與霍姆斯通信集 (ed. da 孫偉) (Beijing: 中國法制出版社, 2010)
- 吳經熊法學文選 (ed. da 李冬松) (Beijing: 中國政法大學出版社, 2012)

== Translations by John C. H. Wu ==
- Lao Tzu's The Tao and Its Virtue (Shanghai: T'ien Hsia Monthly, 1940)
- 我的主日彌撒經書 (Hong Kong: 公教真理學會, 1946)
- 聖詠譯義初稿 (Shanghai: 商務印書館, 1946)
- 新經全集 (Hong Kong: 公教真理學會, 1949)
- Lao Tzu Tao Teh Ching (Jamaica: St. John University Press, 1961)
- 吳譯聖詠手抄本 (ed. by 施家仁安堂) (Taipei: 聖書印版, 1974)
- 聖詠譯義 (Taipei: 臺灣商務印書館, 1975)
- 吳譯宗徒經書手抄本 (ed. by 施家仁安堂) (Taipei: 施家仁, 1991)
- 吳譯四福音手抄本 (ed. by 施家仁安堂) (Taipei: 中華聖母堂, 1991)

== Books Edited by John C. H. Wu ==
- 法學文選 (with 華懋生) (2 vols.) (Shanghai: 會文堂新記書局, 1935)
- An Anthology of Contemporary English Prose (with M. C. Liang 樑淼章) (3 voll.) (Shanghai: Commercial Press, 1935)
- 中華民國六法理由判解匯編 (增訂本) (6 vols.) (Shanghai: 會文堂新記書局, 1936)
- 中國制憲史 (con 黃公覺) (2 vols.) (Shanghai: 商務印書館, 1937)
- 中華民國六法理由判解匯編 (6 vols.) (Updated by 郭衛) (Shanghai: 會文堂新記書局, 1937)
- Essays in Jurisprudence and Legal Philosophy (with M. C. Liang 樑淼章) (Shanghai: Soochow University Law School, 1938)
- 袖珍六法全書 (Shanghai: 會文堂新記書局, 1941)
