= Modern Sketch =

Defunct monthly Chinese art periodical

- Traditional Chinese: 時代漫畫
- Simplified Chinese: 时代漫画
Transcriptions
Standard Mandarin
- Hanyu Pinyin: Shídài Mànhuà
- Wade–Giles: Shih2-tai4 Man4-hua4

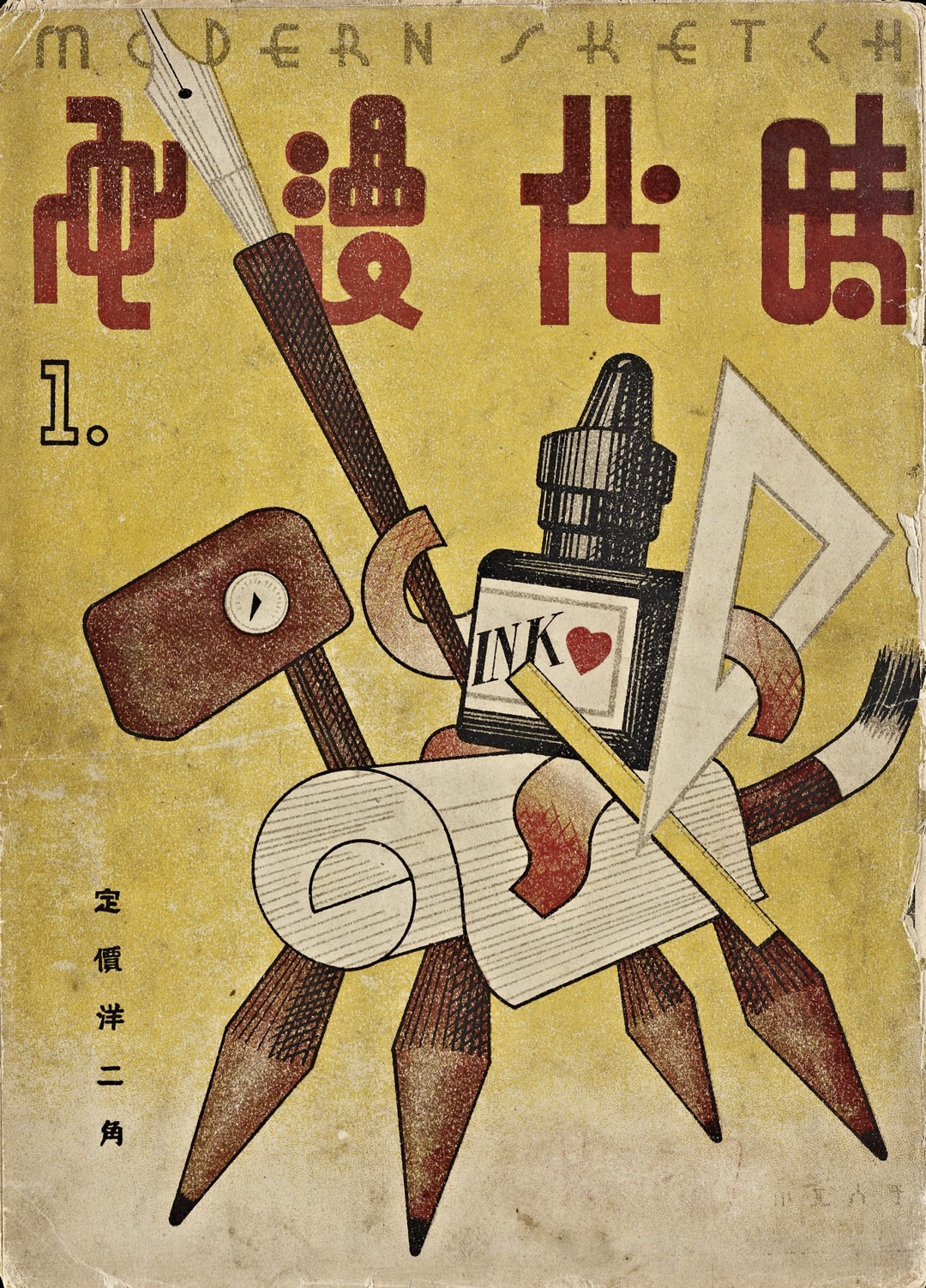
Modern Sketch Issue 1 (January 1934), by Zhang Guangyu

Modern Sketch (Chinese: 時代漫畫) was a monthly Chinese art periodical. It ran from January 1934 through June 1937. The owner of the publication was Shao Xunmei (Zau Sinmay), and the editor was Lu Shaofei (魯少飛; 鲁少飞). The magazine was published by Shao Xunmei's Modern Publications Ltd., headquartered in Shanghai, and Shao Xunmei also published Modern Cinema (時代電影) and Modern Pictorial (時代畫報).

Many of the works featured in the magazine were created by students who later gained positions in the Chinese government later in the 20th century.

Andrew Jones, author of Developmental Fairy Tales, stated that Modern Sketch and its two sister publications "were famous for the quality of their production values and the graphic art (including cartoons, photomontage, and other forms) adorning their pages." The Massachusetts Institute of Technology stated that Modern Sketch had a "kaleidoscopic window onto the past" and that its content "lend blunt visual force to the major crises and contradictions that define China’s 20th century as a quintessentially modern era."

== History ==
Modern Sketch was published during a golden age of Chinese cartooning in Shanghai. The magazine was a cornerstone of the "Manhua" movement, providing a platform for artists to experiment with avant-garde aesthetics and biting social commentary.

The 1936 suspension was a pivotal moment in the magazine's history. Issue #26's caricature of Ambassador Xu Shiying was deemed an insult to a diplomatic official, leading to the arrest of Lu Shaofei. During the hiatus, the editorial team maintained their creative momentum through Modern Puck, ensuring that their audience remained engaged until Modern Sketch resumed in May 1936. The magazine ultimately ceased publication in June 1937 following the outbreak of the Second Sino-Japanese War, as many of its artists joined the National Salvation Cartoon Propaganda Corps.

== Works and Style ==
The magazine's visual style was a sophisticated blend of Art Deco, Surrealism, and traditional Chinese folk art. It was famous for its "Jazz Age" sensibility, capturing the vibrant but chaotic atmosphere of semi-colonial Shanghai.

=== Social and Political Commentary ===
Beyond its "Jazz Age" style, the magazine was deeply political. Artists used photomontage and bold graphic lines to criticize:

- Japanese Imperialism: Many cartoons warned of the impending threat from the North.
- Domestic Corruption: Satirical pieces targeted local bureaucrats and social inequality.
- The "Modern Girl" (Modeng Xiaojie): The magazine frequently depicted the tension between traditional Chinese values and Westernized urban lifestyles through the image of the modern woman.

=== Contributors ===
The magazine served as a training ground for influential artists such as:

- Liao Bingxiong.
- Zhang Guangyu: Known for his architectural line work and social satire.
- Ye Qianyu: Famous for his comic strips and depictions of Shanghai daily life.
- Ding Cong: Who later became one of China's most celebrated editorial cartoonists.

== See also ==
- Shanghai Manhua
