= Yu Feng =

Chinese painter, cartoonist and fashion designer (1916–2007)

- Born: Beijing
- Occupation: Painter, cartoonist, writer, artist
- Spouse(s): Huang Miaozi

Yu Feng (Chinese: 郁风; July 25, 1916 – April 15, 2007) was a Chinese painter, cartoonist, and fashion designer. She and Liang Baibo were China's first female cartoonists. Her husband was the artist Huang Miaozi.

== Life and career ==
Yu Feng was born on July 25, 1916, in Beijing, the daughter of magistrate Yu Hua (郁華). Her uncle was the famed writer Yu Dafu.

She graduated from the Central Academy of Fine Arts in Beijing. She later studied under painter Pan Yuliang.

Her cartooning career began in 1929 or 1930 with her first cartoon, an Aubrey Beardsley-influenced work, in Shanghai Manhua ("Shanghai Sketch"). In Shanghai she married fellow Shanghai Manhua artist Huang Miaozi. Their families had different political orientations and she was taller than him, but they remained married for over sixty years until her death in 2007. Throughout the 1930s, she continued to draw cartoons for magazines like the English-language Zhongguo Zhisheng ("Voice of China") and Jiuwang Ribao ("National Salvation Daily"). One example of her wartime work is the 1938 cartoon "Let the Gunfire of National Salvation Smash This Pair of Shackles", which depicts both nationalistic and gender liberation with its woman breaking the chains of shackles.

In 1955, Yu Feng was deputy editor of the magazine Xin Guancha ("New Observer") when it held a fourm on the future of Chinese fashion. Yu Feng was placed in charge of a national campaign for "dress reform", focusing on matters such as economic frugality, traditional folk dress, and national identity.

Beginning in the early 1940s, Yu Feng and Huang Miaozi were part of a group of artists, writers, and other cultural figures in Shanghai and Chongqing later known as "The Layabouts Lodge" (Erliu Tang 二流堂). During the Cultural Revolution of 1966 to 1976, the members of the Layabouts Lodge were denounced and many were imprisoned. Yu Feng and Huang Miaozi were imprisoned separately for seven years. Yu Feng made paintings out of readily available materials like toilet paper, soap, and candy wrappers. Both artists were politically rehabilitated after the Cultural Revolution and continued to exhibit art in China and throughout the world.

After the Tiananmen Square Massacre in 1989, Yu Feng and Huang Miaozi moved to Brisbane and became Australian citizens, but the couple later returned to China.

Yu Feng died in 2007. In 2011, the Selected Essays of Yu Feng was published, which contained articles reflecting on her work in cartooning, art, and fashion.
