= Dai Ailian =

Trinidadian-Chinese dancer (1916–2006)

- 戴爱莲
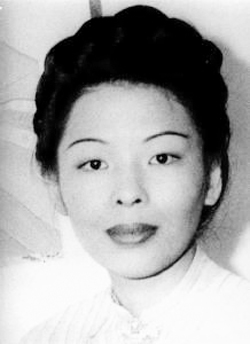
- Born: Eileen Isaac; May 10, 1916; Couva, Trinidad and Tobago
- Died: February 9, 2006 (aged 89); Beijing, China
- Occupations: Dancer, dance teacher, choreographer, company director
- Spouse(s): Ye Qianyu (1940–51); Second husband (div. 1967)

Dai Ailian (Chinese: 戴爱莲; Wade–Giles: Tai Ai-lien; May 10, 1916 – February 9, 2006) was a Trinidadian-Chinese dancer and an important figure in the modern history of dance in China. She was born in 1916 into an overseas Chinese family living in Trinidad and Tobago. Her years as a dance teacher and educator helped China build a generation of dancers, choreographers, and educators. She is known in China as the "Mother of Chinese Modern Dance" for her contributions to the field of dance in China, including her early articulation of three core commitments that shaped dance in China during the second half of the twentieth century.

== Early life ==
Dai Ailian was born in Couva, Trinidad to a third-generation Chinese family, whose origins were in Xinhui, Guangdong Province. Born Eileen Isaac, she never knew her family's Chinese surname, as her paternal grandfather was given the surname Isaac upon his arrival in Trinidad. She used the name Eileen Isaac until her move to England, when her teacher Anton Dolin asked her for her Chinese surname. Her mother selected the surname Dai, after her father's nickname Ah Dai. Influenced by her mother, who loved music, she liked to dance from a young age. She began studying ballet in Trinidad from the age of 7.

In 1931 at the age of 15, Dai moved to London to further her study of ballet under former Ballets Russes dancer Anton Dolin where she danced alongside Alicia Markova. 1930s London was a hub for major ballet talent and she also studied with Marie Rambert and Margaret Craske, the foremost discipline of Enrico Cecchetti. Inspired by German expressionist modern dancers, she joined the classes of Lesley Burrows-Goossens, one of the few modern dancers teaching in London at the time. She went on to study modern dance at Jooss Modern Dance School on full scholarship after it relocated to London. There she learned the theory and techniques developed by Rudolf von Laban including Labanotation, which she was later enthusiastic in spreading in China.

In London Dai saw Indian dancer Uday Shankar as well as Japanese, and Javanese dances, but no Chinese dances, which inspired her to want to create Chinese dances. In this period, she choreographed a number of works, including a solo dance called Yang Guifei's Dance Before the Emperor that she created in 1936 based on her interpretation of the famous concubine, a historical character that Dai learned about at the British Museum Library. In 1937 Dai had a very small role as a Chinese Dancer in The Wife of General Ling. This film is the only recording of Dai's dancing from her time in London. She spoke no Chinese when she left London for China at the end of 1939.

== Founding of modern Chinese dance ==
In 1937, Dai performed in benefit concerts in London organized by the China Campaign Committee to raise funds for the Hong Kong-based China Defense League, which was headed by Soong Ching-ling, wife of Sun Yat-sen. After reading the book Red Star Over China by Edgar Snow during the Japanese invasion of China, she travelled to Hong Kong with the help of Soong in 1940. While in Hong Kong, she premiered her work East River in January 1941 in one of the concerts to raise funds for the war effort against the Japanese invasion. After Hong Kong was attacked by Japan, she traveled to mainland China, where she participated in charity concerts and studied Chinese folk dances and operas. She created pieces based on folk traditions such as The Drum of the Yao People and The Old Piggybacking the Young. This was in line with her theorizing that dance should be rooted in local performance forms. Apart from creating, choreographing, performing dance pieces, she also taught dance all over China.

After the founding of the People's Republic of China in 1949, Dai was at the center of the push to create new dance institutions. In 1949 she was named deputy director of the Central Song and Dance Ensemble, and in 1954 she became the principal of the new Beijing Dance Academy. She also served as director and adviser to the Central Ballet of China, and was the vice-chairman of the Chinese Dancers' Association.

This period also saw the broadening of Dai's artistic path. In the early 1950s, she became involved in the first ballet to be created in China: Dove of Peace, and was its leading performer in the piece. She created dances with strong national flavor based on her studies of Chinese traditional dances, such as the Lotus Flower Dance, Flying Apsaras, Longing for Home, The Mute Carries the Cripple, Tibetan Spring, Anhui Folk Dance, and For Sale, which became her trademark works. Two dances in particular, Dance of Lotus Flowers (based on a Shaanxi folk dance) and Flying Apsaras (inspired by the Dunhuang murals), received acclaim both at home and abroad, and were awarded the gold prize at the World Youth Festival. These two dances were designated classics of 20th-century Chinese dance by authoritative dance organizations in the 1990s.

During the Cultural Revolution (1966–1976), performances of classical dances as well as some folk dances were not allowed in China. After China opened back up to the world in the 1980s, Dai again became influential in Chinese dance circles and was active in the international dance communities. She introduced renowned dancers such as Rudolf Nureyev and Margot Fonteyn to teach in China, and she also promoted Chinese dancers around the world. Starting in the 1980s, she led Chinese dance troupes to international dance competitions, worked as a judge in many international events, and attended various international dance forums. In 1982, she was appointed vice-chairman of the International Dance Council, an organization within UNESCO, and attended its council meetings in Paris every year until her death on February 9, 2006.

== Personal life ==
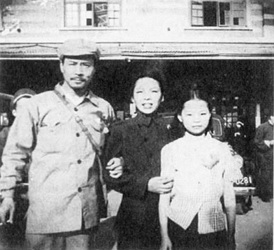
Dai Ailian with her first husband Ye Qianyu and stepdaughter Ye Mingming

Dai met her first husband, the painter Ye Qianyu, shortly after arriving in Hong Kong in 1940. They married in January 1941 in Chongqing, however they divorced in 1956, and she later remarried. In 1941 Dai underwent surgery in Hong Kong that left her sterile and unable to have children of her own.

Dai divorced her second husband in 1967. Dai stayed single the rest of her life, and said when asked if she felt lonely in 1982: "Life is interesting with its ups and downs. I am always occupied, so I have no time to feel lonely."

== Choreographic work ==
London 1935-1939

- Beggar. Chinese dance (Solo). 1935
- March (Chinese: 前进 ) . Chinese dance (Solo). 1935
- Weeping Willows (Chinese: 哭泣的垂柳). Chinese dance (Solo). 1936
- Alarm (Chinese: 警醒). Chinese dance (Solo). 1939

In Hong Kong

- Ruth the Gleaner (Chinese: 拾穗女). Biblical dance (Solo). 1940
- East River (Chinese: 东江). Chinese dance (Solo). 1940

Chongqing, Sichuan:

- Longing for Home (Chinese: 思乡曲). Chinese neo-classical dance (Solo). 1941
- Sale (Chinese: 卖). Chinese contemporary dance (Short ballet). 1942
- Moon of the Miaos (Chinese: 苗家月). Chinese Dance (Pas de deus). 1943
- Dances of Youth (Chinese: 青春舞曲). Uyghur folk dances (Solo, Duet, Quartet). 1943
- Air Raid (Chinese: 空袭). Chinese dance (Short ballet). 1943
- Dream. Modern dance (Pas de deux). 1943
- Guerilla Coup (Chinese: 游击队的故事). Short ballet. 1943
- Yao Ceremonial Dance (Chinese: 瑶人之鼓). Chinese dance (Solo, Trio). 1944 (video)
- The Mute and the Cripple (Chinese: 哑子背疯). Chinese classical dance. 1944 restaged 1950 under name Lao Bei Xiao (Chinese: 老背小). (video)
- Auntie Zhu Presents Eggs to the Army (Chinese: 朱大嫂送鸡蛋). Yangge. (Short ballet). 1944
- Mme. Kan Ba Han. Uyghur folk dance (Pas de deux). 1944
- Happy Cocks. Kanba Tibetan folk dance (Group). 1946
- Tibetan Spring (Chinese: 春游). Kanba Tibetan folk dance (Group). 1946
- Lolo Love Song (Chinese: 倮倮情歌). (Group dance). 1946

Beijing:

- Peace Dove (Chinese: 和平鸽). Dance drama. Collaboration (6 person choreography team). 1950
- Construction of the Motherland (Chinese: 祖国建设). Yangge. 1950
- Lotus Dance (Chinese: 荷花舞). neo-classical Chinese dance (Group). 1953
- Flying Apsaras (Chinese: 飞天). neo-classical Chinese dance (Duet). 1955
- Heroic Little Eighth Routers. Short Chinese ballet for children. 1961

== Prizes and recognition ==
- 1950, Model Worker as Principal Dancer and Choreographer for the ballet Doves of Peace.
- 1951, Third Prize, choreography Tibetan Spring, 3rd World Festival of Youth and Students, Berlin.
- 1953, Second Prize, choreography Lotus Dance, 4th World Festival of Youth and Students, Bucharest.
- 1955, Third Prize, choreography Flying Asparas, 5th World Festival of Youth and Students, Warsaw
- 1955, Winner of the 20th Century Choreographic Award in Beijing for her contribution to Chinese choreography.
