= Whittier (horse) =

Australian Thoroughbred racehorse

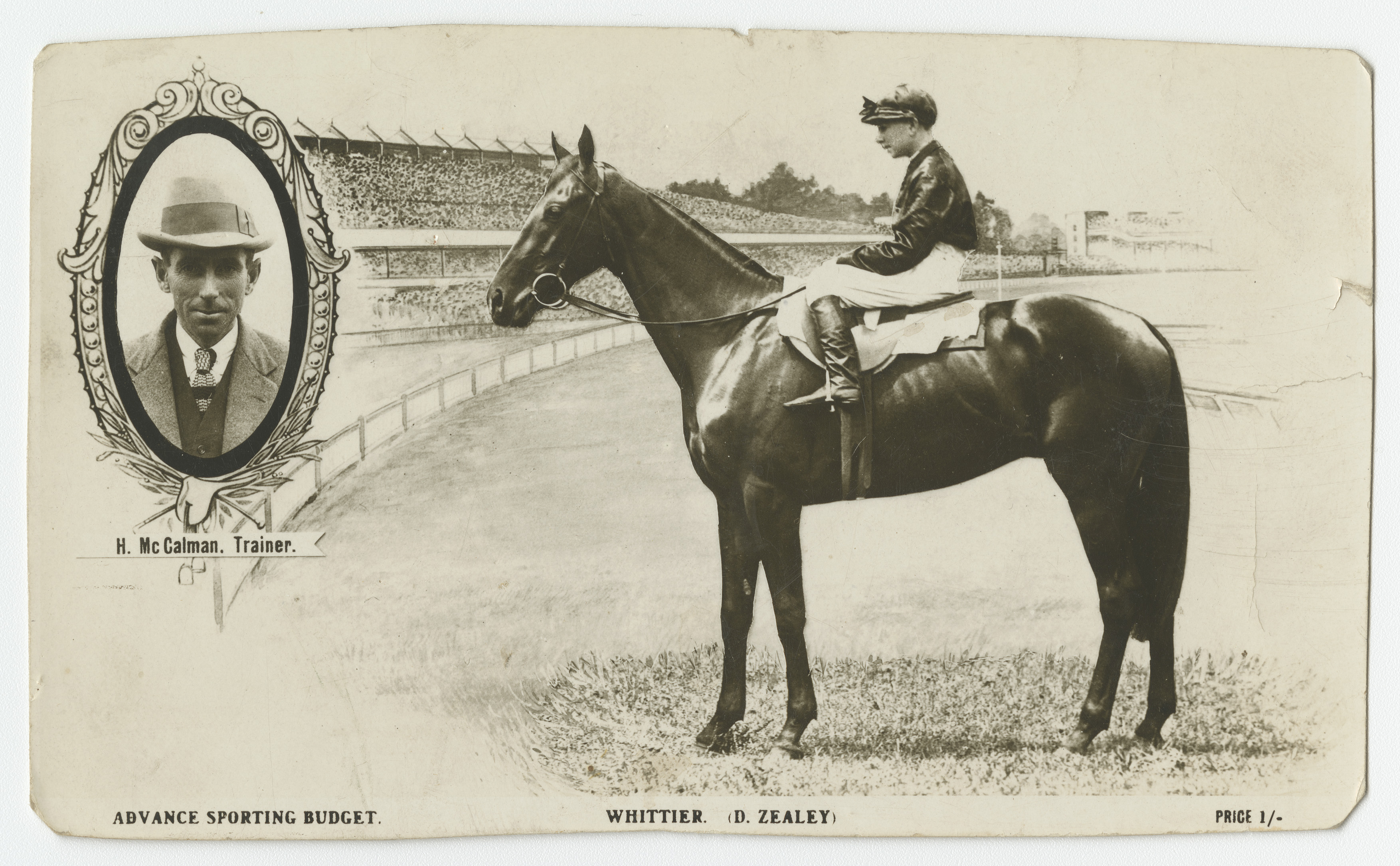
- 'Whittier' with jockey D. Zealey
- Sire: Woorak (AUS)
- Dam: Polacca (AUS)
- Sex: Stallion
- Foaled: 1919
- Colour: Brown
- Owner: Ben Chaffey
- Trainer: Harry McCalman
- Record: 52: 17-16-3

Major wins
- Victoria Derby (1922); Caulfield Cup (1922, 1925); Doncaster Handicap (1924); Rawson Stakes (1924); Underwood Stakes (1924, 1925); Warwick Stakes (1925); C F Orr Stakes (1926); St George Stakes (1926)

Whittier was a notable Australian Thoroughbred race horse.

A son of Woorak (AUS) from the mare Polacca (AUS), he was foaled in 1919 and trained by Harry McCalman.

His owner, Ben Chaffey purchased him for 250 guineas when Lachlan Mackinnon dispersed his Chatsworth Park Stud. Ben Chaffey also owned the champion Manfred.

== Racing record ==
Whittier is best known as a dual Caulfield Cup winner (1922 and 1925), the fifth horse to achieve this feat.

He also recorded wins in the 1922 Victoria Derby and the 1924 Doncaster Handicap.
