= Gu Hongming =

Chinese writer

- 辜鴻銘
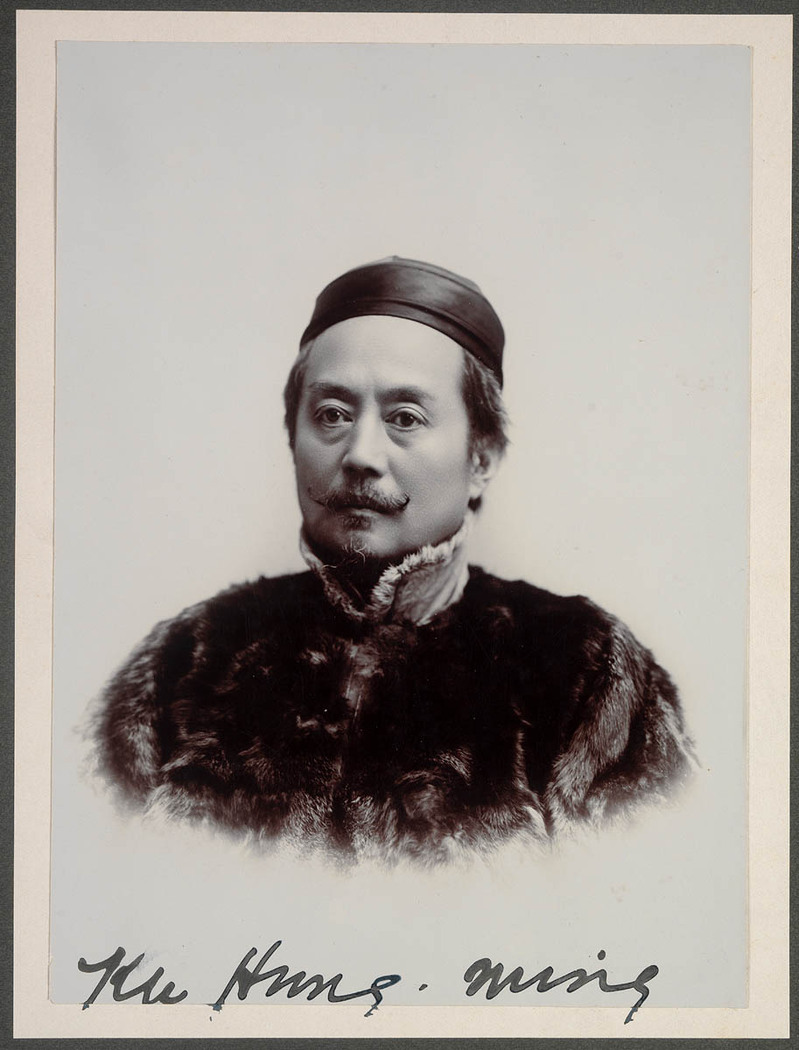
- Gu Hongming, c. 1917
- Born: 18 July 1857; Penang, Straits Settlements
- Died: 30 April 1928 (aged 70); Beijing, Republic of China
- Other name: Tomson
- Education: University of Edinburgh; University of Leipzig; University of Paris
- Occupations: Scholar, professor

Gu Hongming (Chinese: 辜鴻銘; pinyin: Gū Hóngmíng; Wade–Giles: Ku Hung-ming; Pe̍h-ōe-jī: Ko͘ Hông-bêng; 18 July 1857 – 30 April 1928) was a Chinese scholar and man of letters born in British Malaya. He also used the pen name Amoy Ku.

== Life ==
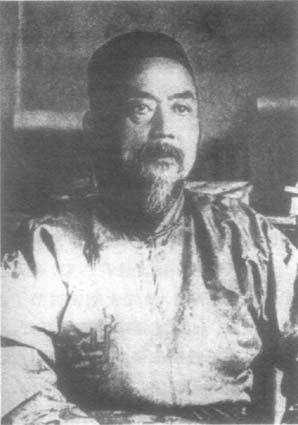
Gu Hongming (1857–1928) in his old age.

Gu Hongming was born in Penang, British Malaya (present day Malaysia), the second son of a Chinese rubber plantation superintendent and his Portuguese wife, whose ancestral hometown was Tong'an, Fujian province, China.The British plantation owner was fond of Gu and took him, at age ten, to Scotland for his education. He was then known as Koh Hong Beng (the Min Nan pronunciation of his name). In 1873 he began studying Literature at the University of Edinburgh, graduating in the spring of 1877 with an M.A. He then earned a diploma in Civil Engineering at the University of Leipzig, and studied law in Paris.

He returned to Penang in 1880, and soon joined the colonial Singapore civil service, where he worked until 1883. He went to China in 1885, and served as an advisor to the ranking official Zhang Zhidong for twenty years.

Leo Tolstoy, whom he had befriended, and Gu were both opposed to the Hundred Days' Reform, which was led by prominent reformist intellectuals of the time, including Kang Youwei.

From 1905 to 1908, he was the director of the Huangpu River Authority (上海浚治黃浦江河道局) in Shanghai. He served in the Imperial Foreign Ministry from 1908 to 1910, then as the president of the Nanyang Public School, the forerunner of Shanghai Jiao Tong University. He resigned the latter post in 1911 as a sign of his loyalty to the fallen imperial Qing government. In 1915, he became a professor at Peking University. Beginning in 1924 he lived in Japan and Japanese-administered Taiwan for three years as a guest lecturer in Oriental cultures. Then he returned to live in Beijing until his death on 30 April 1928 at the age of 72.

An advocate of monarchy and Confucian values, preserving his queue even after the overthrow of the Qing dynasty, Gu became a kind of cultural curiosity late in his life. In 1934, writer Wen Yuan-ning wrote: "That ostentatious display of his queue is very symptomatic of the whole man. He is cross-grained: he lives by opposition." Many sayings and anecdotes have been attributed to him, few of which can be attested. Literary figures as diverse as Ryūnosuke Akutagawa, Somerset Maugham and Rabindranath Tagore were all drawn to visit him when they were in China. No scholarly edition of his complete works is available.

He was fluent in English, Chinese, Hokkien, German, Russian and French, and understood Italian, Ancient Greek, Latin, Japanese and Malay. He acquired Chinese only after his studies in Europe, and was said to have bad Chinese hand-writing. However, his command of the language was far above average. He penned several Chinese books, including a vivid memoir recollecting his days as an assistant for Zhang Zhidong.

His character appeared in the drama "Towards the Republic" and "Awakening Age".

== Works ==
His English works include:

- Papers from a Viceroy's Yamen: a Chinese Plea for the Cause of Good Government and True Civilization (1901)
- Et nunc, reges, intelligite! The Moral Causes of the Russo-Japanese War (1906)
- The Universal Order or The Conduct of Life (1906)
- The Story of a Chinese Oxford Movement (1910)
- The Spirit of the Chinese People (1915)

He translated some of the Confucian classics into English:

- The Discourses and Sayings of Confucius (1898; Chinese: 論語; pinyin: Lunyu)
- The Universal Order or Conduct of Life (1906; Chinese: 中庸; pinyin: Zhongyong)
- Higher Education (1915; Chinese: 大學; pinyin: Daxue)

He rendered William Cowper's narrative poem The Diverting History of John Gilpin into classical Chinese verse (known as 癡漢騎馬歌).
