= C. R. Boxer =

British historian and author (1904–2000)

Sir Charles Ralph Boxer FBA, GCIH
- Born: 8 March 1904; Sandown, Isle of Wight, Hampshire
- Died: 27 April 2000 (aged 96); St Albans, Hertfordshire
- Education: Royal Military College, Sandhurst
- Occupation: Historian

Sir Charles Ralph Boxer (8 March 1904 – 27 April 2000) was a British historian of Dutch and Portuguese maritime and colonial history, especially in relation to South Asia and the Far East. In Hong Kong, he was the chief spy for the British army intelligence in the years leading up to World War II.

== Early life ==
Charles Ralph Boxer was born at Sandown on the Isle of Wight, Hampshire in 1904. On his father's side, he was a descendant of an illustrious British family that had served in command positions in every British war since the French Revolution. Boxer's father Colonel Hugh Edward Richard Boxer served in the Lincolnshire Regiment and had been killed at the Second Battle of Ypres in 1915. While his father's family may have been of Huguenot origin, the family of his mother, Jane Patterson, hailed from Scotland. Her forebears became successful pastoralists in 19th century Tasmania and in Australia.

== Education and military career ==
Charles Boxer was educated at Wellington College and the Royal Military College, Sandhurst. Boxer was gazetted a second lieutenant in the Lincolnshire Regiment in 1923 and served in that regiment for twenty-four years until 1947. He served in Northern Ireland, then, following language and intelligence training, Charles Boxer was seconded to the Imperial Japanese Army in 1930 for three years as part of an exchange of Japanese and English officers. He was assigned to the 38th Infantry Regiment based at Nara, Nara Prefecture, Japan. At the same time, he was assigned to the non-commissioned officers school at Toyohashi. His housekeeper concubine was a northerner from Hakodate on the island of Hokkaido. In 1933, he qualified as an official interpreter in the Japanese language. It was in Japan that he expanded his interest in Portuguese imperial history, concentrating his attention on the first disastrous experiment of European incursion into Japan and its catastrophic ending when Tokugawa closed off the country to outside influence in the 1640s. The Japanese crucified hundreds of Christian missionaries and converts and for good measure executed a delegation of anxious envoys sent out from the Portuguese enclave of Macau to make it entirely clear to the European outsiders that they meant what they said. This was the subject of Boxer's book The Christian Century of Japan. Boxer also took up the traditional Japanese sport of kendo, becoming one of only four British nationals recorded to have done this up until that time. Joining the regimental team he became proficient in the art to the level of being awarded the rank of nidan. He would later use his skill as a method of subterfuge in his profession as a spy when he was sent to Hong Kong in 1936. On visits to the occupied territories he would often have a kendo bout, eat, drink scotch and then pump the various Japanese officers and officials that he was socialising with for information in the true nature of a secret service agent.

Boxer returned to London for a two-year posting 1935–36 to the military intelligence section of the War Office. Posted to Hong Kong in 1936, he served as a General Staff Officer 3rd grade (GSO3) with British troops in China at Hong Kong, doing intelligence work. Between 1937 and 1941, Boxer, promoted from captain to major, became one of the key members of the Far East Combined Bureau, a British intelligence organisation that extended from Shanghai to Singapore. By 1940, most of its Hong Kong office had been transferred to Singapore, leaving Boxer as the army's chief intelligence officer in the colony. In 1940, he was advanced to General Staff Officer 2nd grade (GSO2). Wounded in action during the Japanese attack on Hong Kong on 8 December 1941, he was taken by the Japanese as a prisoner of war and remained in captivity until 1945. After his release, Boxer returned to Japan in February 1946 as a member of the British Far Eastern Commission, a post that he served until the next year. During his military career, Boxer published 86 publications on Far Eastern history with a particular focus on the 16th and 17th centuries.

== Academic career ==
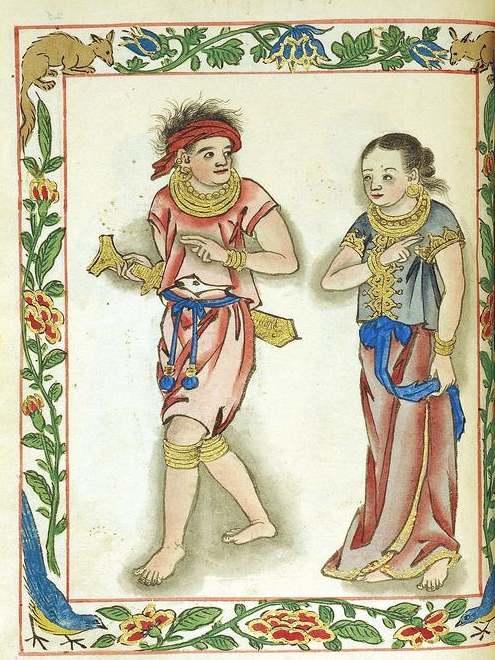
Visayan kadatuan (royal) and his wife, wearing the distinctive color of his class (red), Boxer Codex.

As a major in the British Army, Boxer had resigned from the service in 1947, when King's College London offered him its ″Camões Chair of Portuguese″, a post founded and co-funded by Lisbon, and, at the time, the only such chair in the English-speaking world. During this period, the School of Oriental and African Studies of the University of London also appointed him as its first Professor of the History of the Far East, serving in that post for two years from 1951 to 1953.

On retiring from the University of London in 1967, Boxer took up a visiting professorship at Indiana University, where he also served as an advisor to the Lilly Library located on its campus in Bloomington, Indiana. From 1969 to 1972, Boxer held a personal chair in the history of European Overseas Expansion at Yale University.

Charles R. Boxer died at St Albans, Hertfordshire at the age of 96. Kenneth Maxwell wrote after his death: ″To generations of historians of the Portuguese-speaking world C.R. Boxer was a true colossus. His highly original, pithy, and path-breaking books, monographs, and articles flowed forth with seeming effortlessness. Boxer's works covered the history of early European intrusions into Japan and China during the sixteenth century, and splendid accounts of the opulence and decline of Goa, seat of Portugal's empire in Asia. In over 350 publications, all of the highest order of scholarship, Boxer wrote on sixteenth-century naval warfare in the Persian Gulf, the tribulations of the maritime trading route between Europe and Asia, a sparkling overview of Brazil during the eighteenth century in the age of gold strikes and frontier expansion, magnificent syntheses of both Dutch and Portuguese colonial history, as well as many pioneering comparative studies of local municipal institutions in Asia, Africa, and South America, race relations, and social mores. Famously in the 1960s at the height of Portugal's colonial wars in Africa, he took on the "Luso-tropicalist" propaganda of the Salazar dictatorship by unravelling its roots in Gilberto Freyre's assertion of Portuguese colonial non-racialism and was thoroughly vilified for it by the regime and its apologists.″

== Personal life ==
He was married to Ursula Norah Anstice Tulloch, a woman commonly called the most beautiful in Hong Kong, when he met and had an affair with Emily Hahn, the New Yorker's China correspondent, who herself was involved with one of China's leading intellectuals, Zau Sinmay. In 1945, he married Hahn, with whom he had two daughters, Carola and Amanda Boxer.

== Awards and honours ==
- Honorary doctorate, University of Utrecht, 1950
- Honorary doctorate, University of Lisbon, 1952
- Fellow of the British Academy, 1957
- Honorary doctorate, Universidade Federal da Bahia, 1959
- Honorary doctorate, University of Liverpool, 1966
- Member of the China Academy, Taiwan, 1966
- Papal Knight of the Order of St. Gregory the Great, 1969
- Honorary doctorate, University of Hong Kong, 1971
- Honorary doctorate, University of Peradeniya, 1980
- Gold Medal, Instituto Historico e Geografico Brasileiro, 1986.
- Caird Medal of the National Maritime Museum, 1989
- Distinguished Service Award, Conference on Latin American History 1987

Other awards:

- Knight of Military Order of Saint James of the Sword (Portugal)
- Grand Cross of the Order of Infante D. Henrique (Portugal)

== Published works ==
Bibliographies

- S. George West, A List of the Writings of Charles Ralph Boxer Published Between 1926 and 1984, Compiled for his Eightieth Birthday (London: Tamesis Books Ltd, 1984).
- “The Charles Boxer Bibliography,” Portuguese Studies, vol. 17, 2001, pp. 247–276.

Selected works

- A Portuguese Embassy to Japan (1644-1647). Translated from an Unpublished Portuguese Ms. etc. (Kegan Paul, 1928); republished 1979
- Jan Compagnie in Japan, 1660-1817. An Essay (Martinus Nijhoff, 1936); republished 1950 & 1968
- Fidalgos in the Far East, 1550-1770. Fact and Fancy in the History of Macao (Martinus Nijhoff, 1948); republished 1968
- The Christian Century in Japan, 1549-1650 (University of California, 1951); republished 1967, 1974 & 1993
- Salvador de Sá and the Struggle for Brazil and Angola, 1602-1686 (Athlone Press, 1952)
- South China in the Sixteenth Century (1550-1575) (Hakluyt Society, 1953); editor
- The Dutch in Brazil, 1624-1654 (Clarendon Press, 1957)
- The Great Ship from Amacon: Annals of Macao and the Old Japan Trade, 1555-1640 (Centro de Estudos Historicos Ultramarinos, 1959)
- The Tragic History of the Sea, 1589-1622 (Hakluyt Society, 1959); editor, republished 2001
- The Colour Question in the Portuguese Empire, 1415-1825 (Oxford University Press, 1961)
- The Golden Age of Brazil, 1695-1750: Growing Pains of a Colonial Society (University of California, 1962)
- The Dutch Seaborne Empire, 1600-1800 (Hutchinson, 1965); The "History of Human Society" series
- Portuguese Society in the Tropics: Municipal Councils of Goa, Macao, Bahia and Luanda, 1510-1800 (University of Wisconsin, 1965)
- Francisco Vieira de Figueiredo: A Portuguese Merchant-Adventurer in South-East Asia, 1624-1667 (Martinus Nijhoff, 1967)
- Some Literary Sources for the History of Brazil in the Eighteenth Century. The Taylorian Lecture delivered 9 May 1967 (Clarendon Press, 1967)
- Further Selections from The Tragic History of the Sea, 1559-1565 (Hakluyt Society, 1968); editor
- The Portuguese Seaborne Empire, 1415-1825 (Hutchinson, 1969); The "History of Human Society" series
- Mary and Misogyny: Women in Iberian Expansion Overseas 1415-1815. Some Facts, Fancies and Personalities (Duckworth, 1975)
- The Church Militant and Iberian Expansion, 1440-1770 (Johns Hopkins University, 1978); republished 2001
- Portuguese India in the Mid-Seventeenth Century (Oxford University Press, 1980)
- From Lisbon to Goa, 1500-1750: Studies in Portuguese Maritime Enterprise (Routledge, 1984)
- Portuguese Merchants and Missionaries in Feudal Japan, 1543-1640 (Routledge, 1986)
- Dutch Merchants and Mariners in Asia, 1602-1795 (Routledge, 1988)
- The Journal of Maarten Harpertszoon Tromp. Anno 1639 (Cambridge University Press, 2015); editor

== See also ==
- Boxer Codex
