= Liao Bingxiong =

Chinese political cartoonist, painter

- Born: 1915 Guangzhou, China
- Died: 2006 (aged 90–91)

Liao Bingxiong (Chinese: 廖冰兄; pinyin: Liao Bīngxiōng; Jyutping: liu6 bing1 hing1) was a Chinese political cartoonist, painter and calligrapher. He remained active from 1934 until he gave up in 1995 (with a 20-year break between 1957 and 1978). Liao is widely regarded as one of China's foremost political cartoonists. Liao integrated folk art; Cantonese rhymes and idioms; and woodcut into many of his cartoons.

== Biography ==
He was born Liao Dongsheng (Chinese: 廖东生; pinyin: Liao Dōngshēng; Jyutping: liu6 dung1 sang1). At age 18, he wrote an article for the newspaper Cheng Bao (誠報) in Guangzhou, and signed the article Bingxiong - i.e. "brother of Bing" after his little sister Liao Bing. As an explanation, Liao Bingxiong is said to have asked: "Am I not Liao Bing's brother?"

Early in his life, he worked as a teacher.

He began sending his cartoon from Guangzhou to Shanghai for publication in the well-known magazine Modern Sketch (Shidai manhua 時代漫畫). His works in Modern Sketch quickly established himself as a well-regarded cartoonist in the field.

He drew anti-war illustrations during World War II, and later joined a comic artists organization in Hong Kong.

In 1946 his satirical Spring and Autumn in the Cat Kingdom debuted in Chongqing. In the early 1950s, he returned to the mainland, where he drew children's comics.

Over many years, in a long series of cartoons and calligraphic pieces, Liao documented corruption and abuses of power under the Kuomintang; the Japanese occupation; the regime of Mao Zedong; and many subsequent events. Liao learned to draw by copying, but he never received formal training in art. For this reason he called himself "a wild animal" (野生动物).

Liao died in 2006, at the age of 91. A gallery is named in his honour at the Guangzhou Museum of Art, where some of his works are on display.

== Style as a cartoonist and calligrapher ==
Liao Bingxiong said: "I was sad for the good people who have been victimized. I was angry against the evil people who hurt others. That was why I drew mostly sad and angry cartoons...."

Early in his career, Liao was concerned that his drawings needed to be understood even by those who could not read – so he mainly drew cartoons without any text. In 1938, inspired both by traditional Chinese approaches and by the Mexican artist Miguel Covarrubias, Liao extended his repertoire, and began experimenting increasingly with color and form. Liao's calligraphy has been described direct and "vulgar".
