= Ken Cuthbertson =

Canadian author

- Born: Kenneth James Cuthbertson; May 7, 1951 (age 75); Kingston, Ontario, Canada
- Education: Queen's University at Kingston
- Occupation: Writer
- Notable work: Inside: The Biography of John Gunther

Kenneth James Cuthbertson (born May 7, 1951) is a Canadian author who has written eight books and edited two others. He was the editor of the Queen's Alumni Review magazine from 1987 until 2014.

== Early life and education ==
Cuthbertson was born in Kingston, Ontario. He studied modern American history at Queen's University in Kingston, graduating with an Honors BA in 1974 and earning a Master of Arts degree at Western University in London, Ontario, in 1975. After working as a journalist for five years, he returned to university and graduated from Queen's Law with his JD degree in 1983.

== Journalism career ==
After his university education, Cuthbertson worked at a metropolitan Toronto weekly newspaper in Scarborough, The Regina Leader Post, The London Free Press, and The Kingston Whig-Standard, the latter while attending law school at Queen's University. In 1986, he took a job with the Queen's Alumni Review magazine, serving for one year as assistant editor and then as editor from 1987 to 2014. From 1981 to 1982, he served as the Kingston correspondent for CBC Radio, Ottawa, and as the Kingston "stringer" for the Toronto Sun newspaper.

== Works ==
Cuthbertson wrote Inside: The Biography of John Gunther, which was published in 1992. The book was shortlisted for the 1992 Governor General's Awards. It was followed by Nobody Said Not to Go, published by Faber and Faber in 1998, which was a biography of New Yorker journalist Emily Hahn. He also wrote The Memoirs of the Henry E. MacFutter: The Ring of Truth (2014), published by Quarry Heritage Book.

Following his 2014 retirement from Queen's, Cuthbertson wrote a biography titled A Complex Fate: William L. Shirer and the American Century (foreword by CBS newsman Morley Safer), which was published by the McGill-Queen's University Press. In 2017, Cuthbertson's book The Halifax Explosion: Canada's Worst Disaster, HarperCollins Canada, was shortlisted for an Atlantic Book Award. In 2020, he published 1945: The Year That Made Modern Canada, HarperCollins Canada and Blood on the Coal: The True Story of the Great Springhill Mine Disaster (Foreword by singer Anne Murray)(2023), published by HarperCollins Canada. The latter was a Canadian bestseller book, and was named among the 100 Best Books of 2023 by The Globe and Mail.

In October 2026, Cuthbertson's latest book was published: Seven Bucks a Head: The Scandalous Child Resettlement Scheme That Built a Nation, Sutherland House Books. The book is the story of the more than one hundred thousand British home children who were relocated to Canada in the years from 1869 to 1939.

== Bibliography ==
- Inside: the Biography of John Gunther (1992) (bonus book; ISBN 0-929387-70-8)
- Nobody Said Not to Go (1998) (Faber and Faber; ISBN 0-571-19950-X)
- The Memoirs of the Hon. Henry E. MacFutter: The Ring of Truth (2014; Quarry Heritage Books)
- A Complex Fate: William L. Shirer and the American Century (2015) (McGill-Queen's University Press; ISBN 978-0-7735-4544-1)
- The Halifax Explosion (2017) (HarperCollins Canada; ISBN 978-1-44345-025-6)
- 1945: The Year That Made Modern Canada (2020) (HarperCollins Canada; ISBN 978-14434-593-41)
- Blood on the Coal: The Great Springhill Mine Disaster (2023) (HarperCollins Canada; ISBN 978-14434-679-19)
- When the Ponies Ran: the Untold Story of Kingston's minor pro baseball team, 1946-51 (2021) (Cataraqui Press; ISBN 978-1-7777064-0-1)
- Seven Bucks a Head: The Scandalous Child Resettlement Scheme That Built a Nation (2026) (Sutherland House Press; ISBN 978-1-997701-39-2)
