= Mr. Pan =

1942 memoir by Emily Hahn

Mr. Pan: A Memoir is a 1942 book by Emily Hahn, published by Doubleday Company.

The book includes a series of stories written for The New Yorker, purportedly about a man named Pan Heh-ven, who in reality was Shao Xunmei (Zau Sinmay).

Marianne Hauser of The New York Times stated that the book "will be for a great many readers one of the most delightfully distracting and certainly one of the least political reading experiences of this season." Kirkus Reviews stated that the book was "Perceptive, highlighted, amusing pictures of the often incomprehensibilities of Chinese psychology."
