= Liang Baibo =

Chinese comics artist and painter

- 梁白波
- Born: 1911; Shanghai, China
- Died: circa 1970; Taiwan

Liang Baibo (Chinese: 梁白波; 1911 – c. 1970) was a Chinese manhua artist and painter, best known for her short-lived comic strip, Miss Bee, published in 1935. She and Yu Feng were China's first female cartoonists. Born in Shanghai, she worked in Singapore and the Philippines, and was a member of the avant-garde Storm Society. She had a three-year extramarital relationship with the artist Ye Qianyu, but left him to marry an air force pilot. She moved to Taiwan after the Chinese Communist Revolution, and later died by suicide.

== Early life and career ==
Liang was born in 1911 into a middle-class family in Shanghai, with her ancestral home in Zhongshan, Guangdong. She studied at Hangzhou National College of Art (now China Academy of Art) and then at the Western Art Department of Shanghai Xinhua Art College, where she focused on oil painting.

She was a friend of the revolutionary poet Yin Fu (Bai Mang). In 1930, she drew nine illustrations for his poem collection Children Tower (孩儿塔). However, the book was not published at the time as Yin Fu was executed by the Kuomintang in early 1931 along with four others, together known as the Five Martyrs of the League of Left-Wing Writers.

Liang was a member of the avant-garde Storm Society, founded in 1931 by Pang Xunqin and Ni Yide. She used the pen name Bomb. Although she later dropped it at the exhortation of her friends, she adopted Bon instead, "to preserve the sound of an explosion". Individualistic and adventuresome by nature, she went to Singapore and then the Philippines, where she taught fine art at a Chinese middle school.

== Affair with Ye Qianyu and Miss Bee ==
Liang returned to Shanghai in early 1935. When submitting her cartoon at Time Book Company, she met Ye Qianyu, a prominent artist and editor, and instantly fell in love with him. According to Ye's memoir, she pursued him without caring about the fact that he was married with children, in the spirit of the romanticism of the 1930s.

In the spring of 1935, Liang and Ye participated in a sanitation propaganda project organized by the Tianjin–Pukou railway. They travelled to Beijing by train, where they stayed for a few days, and then decided to go into hiding in Nanjing. Living secretly with Ye, she drew the comic strip, Miss Bee (蜜蜂小姐), which was published on the front page of the newspaper Libao (立报; Standing Paper). It was one of the first and most famous strips with a female main character. The strip was only published for 25 days, however, before Ye's wife Luo Caiyun and her father tracked him down and forced him to return to Shanghai. Luo refused Ye's request for divorce, but the couple became legally separated.

In November 1935, Liang drew cartoons of the marriage of the "Movie Queen" Hu Die. In 1936, she was elected as one of the 31 members of the Arranging Committee of the First National Cartoon Exhibition.

When Japan invaded China and occupied Shanghai in 1937, Ye Qianyu, together with a group of fellow Shanghai cartoonists, formed the "National Salvation Cartoon Propaganda Corps". Funded by the Kuomintang government, the corps left Shanghai for the interior to spread anti-Japanese propaganda. Liang was the only female member of the corps.

The propaganda corps evacuated Shanghai and went to Wuhan. There she created a cartoon depicting a guerrilla fighter standing as a giant in front of the Japanese Army, which is considered her representative work in war propaganda. She also created the work Women Joining the War, which was exhibited in the Soviet Union. In 1938, Liang met Chen Enjie (陈恩杰), a pilot of the Republic of China Air Force, and fell in love with him on the spot. She terminated her three-year affair with Ye and later married Chen. She travelled to Tibet during the war.

== Later life and death ==
After the surrender of Japan, Liang returned to Shanghai in 1946 and travelled to Xinjiang to paint. When the Communist Party took over mainland China, she moved to Taiwan with her husband, and had a son. In Taiwan, she reconnected with Liao Molin (廖末林), another former member of the National Salvation Cartoon Propaganda Corps, and worked at a kiln Liao opened in Tainan. She later met the writer Lin Haiyin, who introduced her to work as an illustrator for the newspaper United Daily News. However, she did not find career success in Taiwan and suffered from schizophrenia. She died by suicide in Taiwan, circa 1970.

== Legacy ==
Liang is known as China's first female cartoonist, although Yu Feng was her contemporary and possible predecessor. Her known works are few but are praised for their high quality. Her short-lived comic strip, Miss Bee, is described by a critic as "very lovely; the lines were soft and beautiful, and the themes were very interesting. It drew much attention from other cartoonists and was welcomed by readers from the beginning." In Ye Qianyu's memoir, he recalled his three years spent with Liang fondly, and described her as a "talented painter". He said that she had a "poet's temperament" and that he drew much inspiration from her when creating his own works such as the comic strip Mr. Wang.
