= Lorraine Murray (adventurer) =

Australian sex worker, counter-intelligence informant and librarian

Lorraine Agnes Murray
- Lorraine Murray in Shanghai, 1938
- Born: Laurinna Agnes Treweek; 22 January 1910; Fullarton, South Australia
- Died: 7 January 2000 (aged 89); Wagga Wagga, New South Wales

Lorraine Murray (born Laurinna Agnes Treweek, 22 January 1910 – 7 January 2000) was an Australian adventurer, journalist and London society hostess whose eventful life in pre-war Asia included relationships with prominent figures in Japanese and Shanghai society, a period working as a high-class sex worker (or demimondaine, as she preferred to call herself), and a close friendship with the American writer Emily Hahn. Just before the outbreak of World War II, she returned to Australia and, unable to leave the country, was recruited as a counter-intelligence informant for the Commonwealth Investigation Branch.

In 1947, Murray moved to the United Kingdom, where she was reunited with Hahn and worked as the writer's nanny and typist. The pair remained lifelong friends. Murray inspired characters in several of Hahn's works, including the novel Miss Jill (1947), a fictionalised account of Murray's early life. In 1948, she married the businessman Edmund Ellis Toeg, a close acquaintance from her Shanghai days. The couple remained married until Toeg's death in the mid-1970s. Murray spent much of her later life in London, where she became an assistant librarian at the Royal Asiatic Society.

== Early life ==
Murray was born at the St Joseph's Refuge in Fullarton, South Australia. The home provided accommodation for unmarried mothers and their children, who could remain there until their children turned three. Her mother, Laura Caroline Treweek, a domestic worker from New South Wales, had travelled to Fullarton to give birth there. No father was listed on the baby Laurinna's birth certificate.

Murray spent her first two years with foster parents in Adelaide until she rejoined her mother, who lived between Sydney and Melbourne. By this time Laura was in a relationship with Ben Chaffey, a wealthy but married pastoralist and businessman. The couple had three children together and Murray's mother, to avoid judgement as an unwed mother, began claiming to be a widow. She went by the name 'Mrs Murray'. Then relationship ended in 1918 but Chaffey continued to provide financial support to Laura and their children.

Murray attended various schools in Sydney until, struggling to get along with her mother, she was sent to New England Girls' School in Armidale. She remained there as a boarder from 1925 to 1927. During her time at Armidale, she received her intermediate certificate. On leaving school, she returned to Sydney to train as a stenographer and typist.

== Time in Asia ==
Having gained these qualifications Murray was then employed as a junior reporter at The Sun in Sydney, and it was in this role, while preparing for the 'social rounds' at a city nightclub she met Tokugawa Iemasa who was then the Japanese consul-general. They formed a sexual relationship and, in July 1931, she travelled with him to Ottawa, Canada. Here she officially joined his household as a companion to his daughter. Later they travelled together to Tokyo where, after their relationship became clear, she was expelled from Japan is September 1933.

From 1934 Murray established herself as a sex worker in Shanghai (China) where she worked at a 'high class' brothel in the city’s International Settlement. Murray called herself a demimonde, meaning a woman on the fringes of respectable society, rather than a sex worker. During this time she worked under various aliases including Lorraine Lee and Johnny Jean. In 1936 she formed a relationship with Edmund Ellis Toeg, a businessman, and, with his financial aid, she was able to leave the brothel. In 1937 in the Battle of Shanghai, during which she served as a volunteer nursing aide, she met, and began an affair with Luigi Barzini Jr. Barzini was an Italian journalist serving as an Asian correspondent; during their turbulent relationship, she had an abortion and made a suicide attempt.

Seeing Murray struggling Toeg persuaded Emily Hahn, an American writer, to take Murray 'under her wing'. Murray and Hahn then lived together for a time and Hahn helped her re-establish herself and it was the beginning of a lifelong friendship.

== Return to Australia ==
Murray returned to Australia to visit family in August 1939 and, although she planned to stay for only a few months, she was unable to leave due to the outbreak of World War II. She was treated with suspicion by the government and, when applying to return to China (July 1940) she was rejected. However, due to her numerous connections with high ranking Japanese and Italian contacts she was recruited by the Commonwealth Investigation Branch in November 1940 as an informant.

During her early years as an informant she had a number of 'targets', including a former school friend Gerda Holterhoff, however, her most prominent target was Rupert Lockwood, a journalist and member of the Communist Party of Australia. Later, in documents that were revealed during the Australian Royal Commission on Espionage, Lockwood described Murray as 'very beautiful' and 'remarkably stupid'. During the Commission itself he clarified some of his experiences with her and stated 'she was probably the most embarrassing informer [the CIB] ever recruited' and described her as '[t]he shady lady hired by the secret police to watch me was beautiful, irresponsible, vicious and slanderous'.

From 1942 to 1947 Murray transferred to work as a secretary for the United States Army, first based in Sydney and then in Brisbane.

It was during this period that Hahn published her memoir China to Me (1944) which became a bestseller. Murray was included in this book as the character 'Jean', this identified her publicly as a former sex worker and, later, she also learned of Hahn's plans to write a novel, more directly drawing on her life story.

== Time in the United Kingdom ==
Due to fear about Hahn's book coming out, and it negatively affecting her life in Australia, Murray travelled to England to join Hahn in July 1947. Shortly after this, in November, Miss Jill (1947), the novel about her, was published. While in England Murray worked for Hahn as a nanny and typist. Murray would appear as a character in several more of Hahn's books.

Here Murray reconnected with Toeg whom she married on 17 November 1948 and, after an extended honeymoon on the French Riviera, they moved into a house in Knightsbridge (London). In the 1950s Murray began working for various organisations, including the Royal Central Asian Society and the Pakistan Society, until in the 1970s she worked as an assistant librarian for the Royal Asiatic Society.

== Later life ==
In 1985, a decade after Toeg's death, she returned to Australia where she settled near Wagga Wagga with her brother and his family until moving into a nursing home there.

She died on 7 January 2000.
