= Ben Chaffey =

Australian businessman

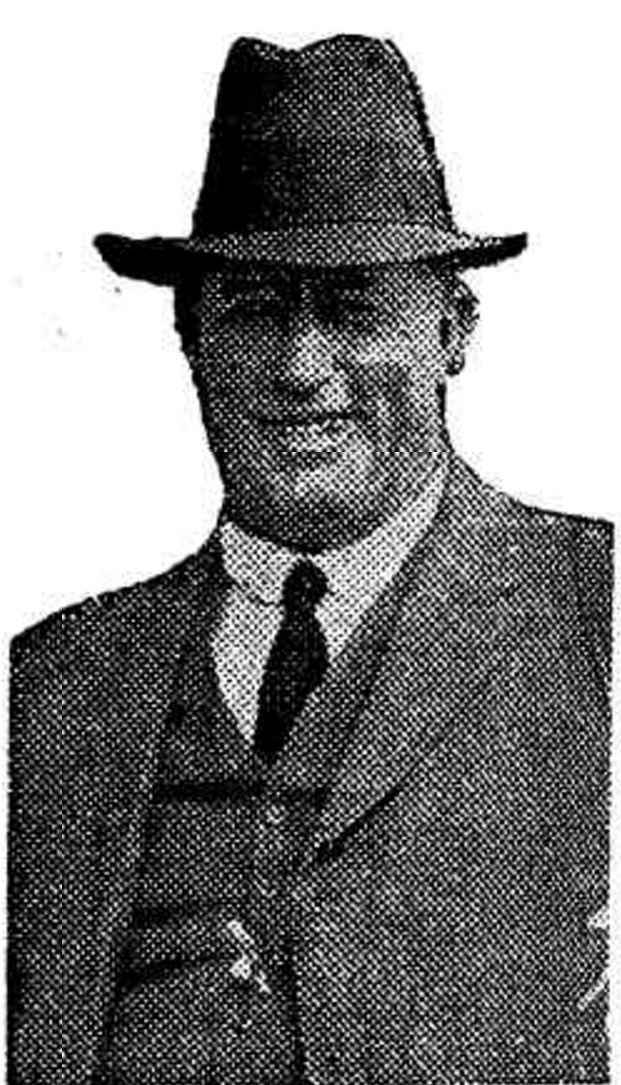
Ben Chaffey, 1923

Ben Chaffey (1876 – 3 March 1937) was a butcher, pastoralist and businessman in Australia. He was active in horse racing.

== Early life ==
Ben Chaffey was born in Kingston, Ontario, Canada, the son of engineer George Chaffey and his wife Ann. The family came to the Colony of Victoria in 1885 and Ben lived with his parents in Mildura, Victoria.

== Business interests ==
Chaffey worked as a butcher, but his fortune started with a winning gamble on his horse "Mavis". He became the owner of Moorara station in New South Wales, followed by Tapio, Culpaulin, Cuthero, Avoca. Kilfera, Manfred, Tolarno and other properties, most of which were subsequently taken up by the Crozier family.

He was elected chairman of the board of directors of United Distillers Pty. Ltd., a director of Goldsbrough Mort & Co., and managing director of Manfred Pastoral Co. He was a member of the Australian Club and various sporting clubs. He was the owner of several successful racehorses, including Caulfield Cup winners Manfred and Whittier, and in 1930 served as chairman of the Victoria Amateur Turf Club.

== Personal life ==
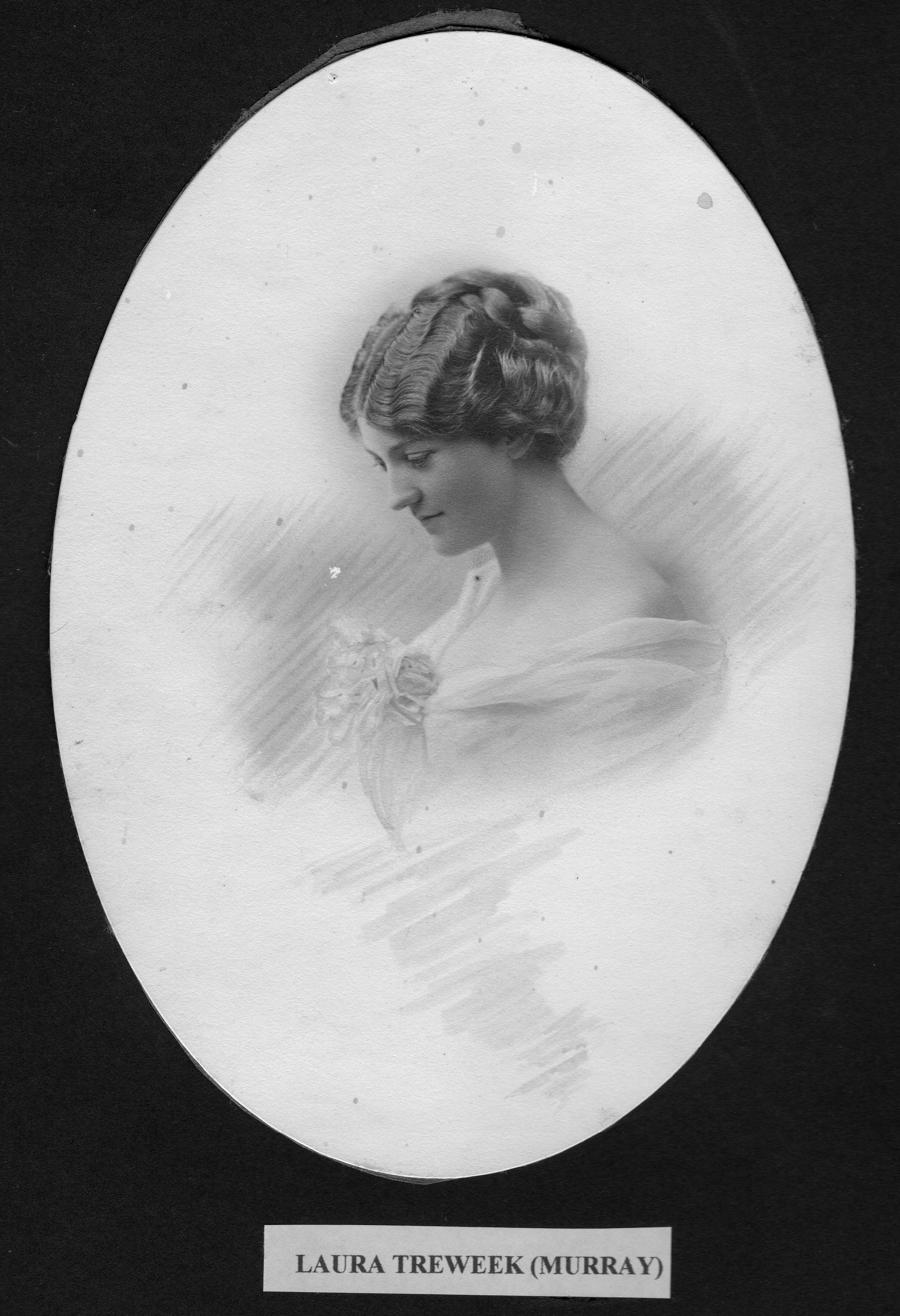

He married Cowra Crozier, a daughter of Elliot Crozier. They had a daughter, Mavis (Mrs. Albert Campbell). However, he also had a relationship with Laura Treweek (mother of Lorraine Murray) between 1912 and 1918 and they had three children together although he would continue to financially support them.

The lives of Chaffey and Laura are documented in a book by Louise Austin, Journey to Tobruk.

He died at his home in Tullamarine, Victoria.

Chaffey was known for his mischievous spirit. He liked a bet on his horses and on one occasion had a lot of money on one which ran a bad race. As the horses were coming back to scale, a stranger alongside Chaffey said: "Isn’t that Chaffey a bastard." "Too right,” Chaffey agreed, "let's go and boo his horse."
