= Amanda Boxer =

English actress

- Born: 1948 (age 76–77); London, England
- Education: London Academy of Music and Dramatic Art
- Occupation: Actress
- Years active: 1969–present
- Parent(s): C. R. Boxer; Emily Hahn

Amanda Boxer (born 1948) is an English theatre, television, and film actress. She is perhaps best known for her role in the film Saving Private Ryan (1998).

== Early life ==
Boxer was born in London, the daughter of English scholar C.R. Boxer and American author Emily Hahn.

== Career ==
Boxer is known for her performances in The Last Days of Judas Iscariot at the Almeida Theatre, Cling to Me Like Ivy at the Birmingham Repertory Theatre, and The Painter at the Arcola Theatre. Her credits include Sense and Sensibility, The Cleopatras, The Gentle Touch, Miss Marple, (Sleeping Murder episode), Between The Lines, Trial & Retribution, Casualty and The Brothers, Boxer played Amanda Trippley in both series of the BBC sitcom Chalk. She also had a role as Mrs. Ryan in Saving Private Ryan, and played the mother of Matt Smith's character in the 2009 short film Together. In January 2020, Boxer appeared in an episode of the BBC soap opera Doctors as Elizabeth Pinfield.

== Selected theatre performances ==
- Arsinoe in The Misanthrope by Moliere. Directed by Casper Wrede at the Royal Exchange, Manchester. (1981)
- Calpurnia in Julius Caesar. Directed by Robert Delamere at the Royal Exchange, Manchester. (1994)
- Marion Brewster-Wright in Absurd Person Singular by Alan Ayckbourn. Directed by James Maxwell at the Royal Exchange, Manchester. (1994)
- Monica Reed in Present Laughter by Noël Coward. Directed by Matthew Lloyd at the Royal Exchange, Manchester. (1998)
- Mme Pinchard in The Fall Guy by Georges Feydeau. Directed by Matthew Lloyd at the Royal Exchange, Manchester. (2001)
- Mrs Baker in Come Blow Your Horn by Neil Simon. Directed by Jacob Murray at the Royal Exchange, Manchester. (2005)

== Films ==
- Miss Biggs in Cider with Rosie (1998)
