= Wen Yuan-ning =

Chinese professor, writer and diplomat

- Traditional Chinese: 溫源寧
- Simplified Chinese: 温源宁
Transcriptions
Standard Mandarin
- Hanyu Pinyin: Wēn Yuánníng
- Wade–Giles: Wen Yüan-ning
Hakka
- Romanization: Vun1 Ngian2 Nen2
Southern Min
- Hokkien POJ: Un Goân-lêng

Wen Yuan-ning (Chinese: 溫源寧 1900-1984), also known as Oon Guan-neng, was a Chinese professor, writer, and diplomat.

== Life and career ==
Wen Yuan-ning was born in Bangka off Sumatra, formerly of the Dutch East Indies and now of Indonesia, to an immigrant Chinese Hakka family. He grew up in Bangka and Singapore and went on to study in England where he registered under the Hakka name of Oon Guan-neng at King's College, Cambridge. After receiving his B.A. Hons. and LLB degrees, Wen moved to China and took the Mandarin transliteration of his name Wen Yuan-ning.

Wen became a professor of English language and literature in 1925, teaching at various institutions including Peking University, Tsinghua University, Peking Women’s College of Education in 1920s Peking and Kwang Hua University in 1930s Shanghai. Some of his notable students were Liang Yuchun, Qian Zhongshu, Cao Yu, Li Jianwu. He became a contributing editor of the English-language weekly The China Critic (1928–1940, 1946) and editor-in-chief of the English T'ien Hsia Monthly (1935–1941).

Since 1936, he served as a member of the Legislative Yuan. In 1937, he was appointed as the representative of the Publicity Department of Kuomintang in Hong Kong. In 1946, he was elected National Assembly representative and the same year, he was appointed as the Chinese Ambassador to Greece, a role he served until his recall to Taiwan in 1968. After his retirement from the government, he taught English literature at National Taiwan University, Taiwan Normal University and the Chinese Culture University.

Wen Yuan-ning was the author of Imperfect Understanding (Kelly and Walsh, Shanghai, 1935), a collection of seventeen profiles of prominent Chinese intellectuals. The essays in the book were excerpted from fifty essays that appeared in his column in The China Critic in 1934 called "Unedited Biographies" (later "Intimate Portraits"). His subjects included Hu Shih, Wu Mi, Xu Zhimo, Zhou Zuoren, Wellington Koo, Gu Hongming, Han Fuju, Ma Junwu, Mei Lanfang, George T. Yeh, Y.R. Chao, Emperor Puyi, Feng Yuxiang, Lim Boon Keng, Ling Shuhua, Wang Delin, Lao She, Wu Zhihui, Feng Youlan, Ku Zing-whai, and Liu E.
