= Shao Xunmei =

Chinese poet and publisher

- 邵洵美
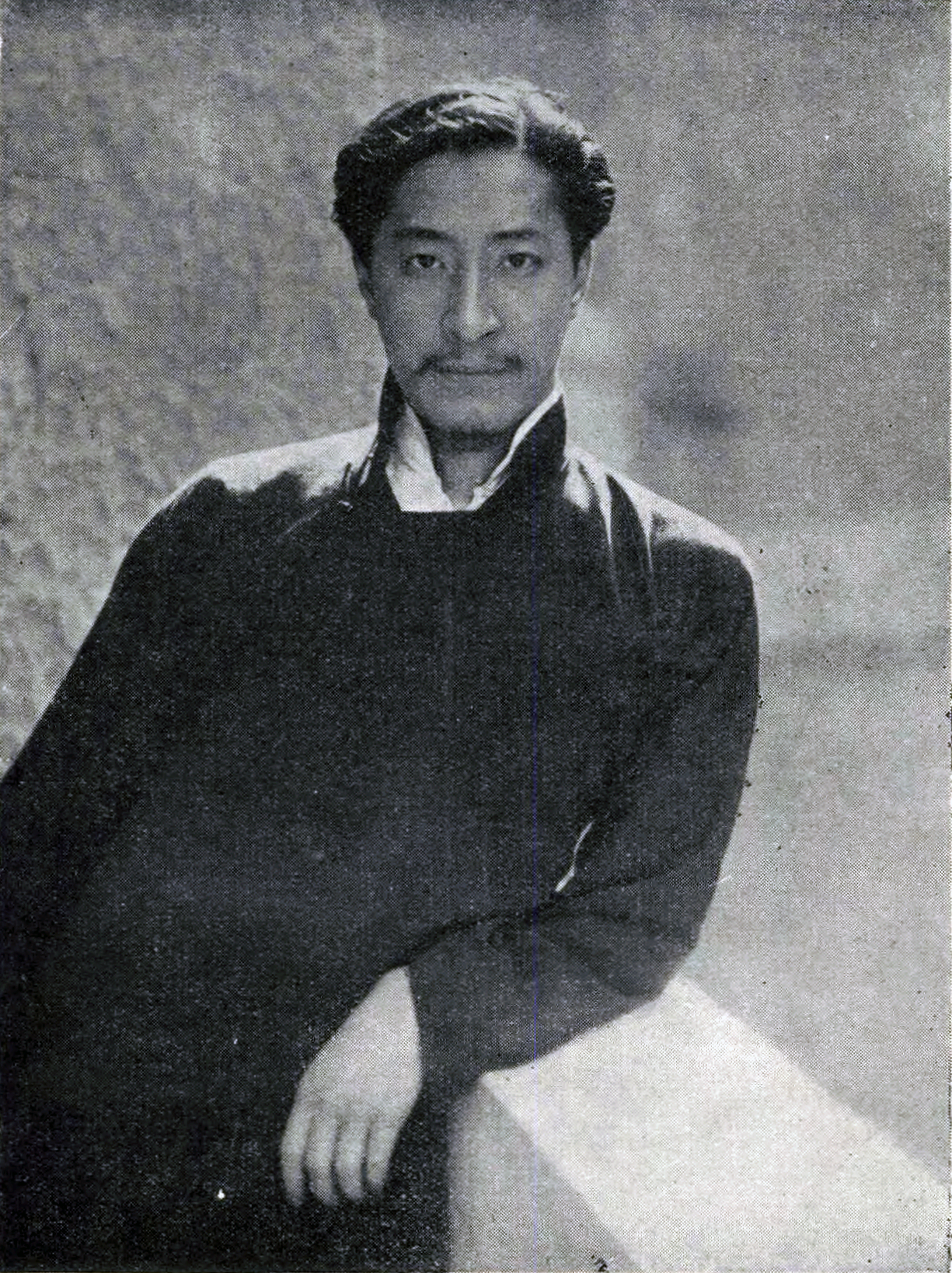
- c. 1934
- Born: Shao Yunlong; 邵雲龍; 1906; Shanghai, Qing China
- Died: 1968 (aged 61–62); Shanghai, People's Republic of China
- Resting place: Gui Yan Cemetery
- Citizenship: Chinese
- Education: Beaux-Arts de Paris
- Occupations: Writer, poet, publisher
- Spouse: Sheng Peiyu (m. 1927)
- Partner: Emily Hahn
- Writing career
- Pen name: Hao Wen; 浩文
- Language: Chinese
- Years active: 1918-36

Shao Xunmei
- Chinese: 邵洵美
Transcriptions
Standard Mandarin
- Hanyu Pinyin: Shào Xúnměi
- Wade–Giles: Shao Hsün-mei

Shao Yunlong
- Traditional Chinese: 邵雲龍
- Simplified Chinese: 邵云龙
Transcriptions
Standard Mandarin
- Hanyu Pinyin: Shào Yúnlóng
- Wade–Giles: Shao Yün-lung

Hao Wen
- Chinese: 浩文
Transcriptions
Standard Mandarin
- Hanyu Pinyin: Hào Wén
- Wade–Giles: Hao Wen

Shao Xunmei (Chinese: 邵洵美; Shanghainese: Zau Sinmay; 1906–1968) was a Chinese poet and publisher. He was a contributing writer for T'ien Hsia Monthly, and also was the owner of Modern Sketch. He originated from Shanghai. Jonathan Hutt wrote in Monstre Sacré: The Decadent World of Sinmay Zau that "For many, Shao was not simply inspired by the Occident but rather was of it" and that his lack of awareness of "the Chinese literary scene" distinguished him from his colleagues. On some occasions he used the name Hao Wen (浩文).

== Life ==
He was born Shao Yunlong (Chinese: 邵雲龍; lit. 'dragon in the skies') in 1906 into a wealthy Shanghainese family with its ancestral hometown in Yuyao, Zhejiang. Shao lived in the wealthiest part of Shanghai, Bubbling Well Road. His grandfather Shao Youlian was a high-ranking official who served as governor of Taiwan and as a diplomat to Russia. His father Shao Heng (邵恆) married Sheng Xihui (盛樨蕙), a daughter of the tycoon Sheng Xuanhuai; Xunmei was the oldest of their six children. Shao claimed descent from Song-era philosopher Shao Yong, posthumously known as Shao Kangjie.

Shao had been tailed by tabloids since his childhood and had various girlfriends including the actress White Lotus (白蓮 Báilián) and a woman with the English name Prudence; Shao was briefly jailed after a man who was infatuated with Prudence was murdered but Shao was found to have been not guilty and released.

Shao began a tour of Europe at age 17 in 1923 and continued it until 1927, going to Naples, Italy; Cambridge, England, and the École des Beaux Arts in Paris; he was educated in Cambridge and Paris. While in Europe he had relationships with women there. He finished a poetry collection towards the end of the trip and published it, titled Parade and May, in 1927. He became intrigued by the English writer Algernon Charles Swinburne and French writer Charles Baudelaire. The titles of works Fire and Flesh (火與肉 Huǒ yǔ ròu) and Flower-like Evil (花一般的罪惡 Huā yībān de zuì'è) were respectively inspired by a Swinburne poem and Les Fleurs du Mal by Baudelaire. The latter is an updated version of the earlier Paradise and May.

In December 1927 he married his cousin and childhood love Sheng Peiyu (盛佩玉), a granddaughter of Sheng Xuanhuai. Hutt described Sheng as a "trophy wife". She was also known as "Zoa".

Twenty-five Poems (詩二十五首 Shī èrshíwǔ shǒu), Shao's collection of poetry that was published in 1936, did not garner significant attention. Hutt stated that Shao's popularity was declining by 1936.

In 1937 he began an affair with Emily "Mickey" Hahn; the affair ended after Hahn stopped smoking opium. When Hahn wrote articles for The New Yorker, she referred to Shao as "Pan Heh-ven," forming the basis of the 1942 book Mr. Pan. Hahn used Shao as the inspiration for Sun Yuin-loong, a character in Steps of the Sun. After the Japanese invasion, Hahn was not interned as she had stated she was legally married to Shao Xunmei on a document and therefore the Japanese treated her as, in the words of Taras Grescoe of The New Yorker, "an honorary Asian". Hahn stated that Shao's wife approved of the document since it was a possible method of saving his press and that Shao had not been married "according to foreign law". According to an article published in Ming Pao, a Hong Kong newspaper, during World War II, Shao had a habit of drinking alcohol and gambling and therefore racked up a lot of expenses; Hahn covered the costs by selling her books. Hahn later wrote about Shao in her memoir, China to Me: A Partial Autobiography, using his actual name, spelled as "Sinmay Zau".

Shao had a son, Shao Zucheng, who attended schools operated by American missionaries and became an English teacher. He also had a daughter, Shao Xiaohong.

In 1958 Shao Xunmei wrote a letter to a friend in the United States and as a result was imprisoned. He was released in three years but his health had declined and did not improve afterwards. Shao Zucheng stated "When he came out of jail, he was so thin. He looked just like a monkey."

Hahn learned that Shao eventually stopped using opium. After Shao died, Hahn was unaware that he was dead. He was buried in Gui Yan Cemetery.

== Legacy ==
Hutt stated that Shao continued to be perceived as "a caricature" by the 1990s even though his image had been somewhat rehabilitated in that decade.

Jicheng Sun and Hal Swindall, authors of "A Chinese Swinburne: Shao Xunmei's Life and Art," wrote circa 2015 that few people were aware of him "except for a handful of scholars of modern Chinese literature"; they stated that there were not many scholarly articles about Shao and that reference books published in China "give him a few lines as a minor poet with decadent tendencies".

== Selected works ==
- Flower-like Evil (花一般的罪惡 Huā yībān de zuì'è). Jinwu shudian (Shanghai), 1918.
- Paradise and May (poetry collection), 1927.
- Heaven and May (天堂與五月 Tiāntáng yǔ wǔ yuè). Guanghua shuju (Shanghai), 1927.
- Fire and Flesh (火與肉 Huǒ yǔ ròu). Jinwu shudian (Shanghai), 1928.
- "Jinwu Tanhua" (金屋談話; Talk at Maison d'or). Jinwu Yuekan (金屋月刊; La Maison d'Or Monthly), January 1929, Volume 1, Issue 1, p. 157.
  - Translated into English by Reverend Moule and Paul Pelliot, within Marco Polo: The Description of the World (Routledge and Sons, London, 1938).
- As Hao, Wen: Review of The Escaped Cock by D.H. Lawrence. In: "Shubao Chunqiu" (書報春秋; Books and Newspapers Annals), Xinyue (新月), 1932, 1–4.
- A One-Way Conversation (一個人的談話 Yīgèrén de tánhuà). Diyi Chubanshe (Shanghai), 1935.
- Twenty-five Poems (詩二十五首 Shīèr shíwǔ shǒu), 1936.

Heaven and May and Twenty-five Poems have been translated into English by Jicheng Sun and Hal Swindall in The Verse of Shao Xunmei (Paramus: Homa & Sekey Books, 2016)
