= List of manhua =

This is a list of manhua, or Chinese comics, ordered by year then alphabetical order, and shown with region and author. It contains a collection of manhua magazines, pictorial collections as well as newspapers.

== Hong Kong / Mainland China ==
=== 1800s ===
English name	Alternate or Pinyin Name	Year	Chinese name	Author
China Punch		1867		
The Situation in the Far East		1899	時局圖	Tse Tsan-tai

=== 1900s ===
English name	Alternate or Pinyin Name	Year	Chinese name	Author
Man Fu Daily		1909	民吁日報	Various
Journal of Current Pictorial		1905	時事畫報	Pan Dawei (潘達微), Gao Jianfu, Xie Yingbo (謝英伯), He Jianshi, Zheng Leiquan (鄭磊泉)
Enlightenment Pictorial		1908	蒙學畫報	
People Pictorial	Ping-wen Huabao	1908	平民畫報	Pan Dawei, Gao Jianfu, Xie Yingbo, He Jianshi, Zheng Leiquan

=== 1910s ===
English name	Alternate or Pinyin Name	Year	Chinese name	Author
Condemnations from Heaven		1911	天討	
The True Face of the Nation's Betrayer in the Present		1911	現代漢奸之真相	
The True Record		1912	真相畫報	He Jianshi, Zheng Leiquan

=== 1920s ===
English name	Alternate or Pinyin Name	Year	Chinese name	Author
Renjian Pictorial		1920	人鑑	Zheng Leiquan
Children's Pictorials Bimonthly Magazine		1923	兒童畫報半月刊	Unknown
Zi-kai Manhua		1925	子愷漫畫	Feng Zikai
Shanghai Sketch	Shanghai Manhua	1928	上海漫畫	Ye Qianyu, Zhang Guangyu (張光宇), Huang Wennong (黃文農)
The Sketch	Bun-gok Manhua	1929	半角漫畫	Ye Yinquan (葉因泉)

=== 1930s ===
English name	Alternate or Pinyin Name	Year	Chinese name	Author
Modern Miscellany		1930	時代圖畫半月刊	Various
Children's Magazine		1932		Unknown
Children's World Bimonthly		1932	兒童世界	Unknown
Modern Sketch	Modern Manhua	1934	時代畫報	Various
Young Children's Literature Collection		1934	幼童文庫叢書	Unknown
Sanmao	Three Hairs	1935	三毛	Zhang Leping
Shanghai Manhua		1936	上海漫畫	Various
Good Children's Weekly: Children Reading Materials		1938	好孩子周刊兒童讀物	Unknown
The Modern Chinese Cartoonist Exhibition Catalog		1939	現代中國漫畫展	Ye Qianyu

=== 1940s ===
English name	Alternate or Pinyin Name	Year	Chinese name	Author
New Children's Bimonthly Magazine	Young Pioneers	1941-1956	新兒童半月刊	Xu Dishan, Feng Zikai, Yan Wenjing, Hu Bingchun (胡冰春)
Chau Yat-ching		1946	周日清	Yu-Ming
Fong Tong-geng Teases Chan Mung-gat		1946	荒唐鏡三氣陳夢吉	Lui Yu-tin (雷雨田)
Wu-lung Wong	Brother of Blunders, King of Blunders	1946	烏龍王	Lui Yu-tin
Hot-tempered Leung		1947	牛精良	Yuen Po Wan (袁步雲)
Man in Suit		1947	西裝友	To Jo Wai (杜祖惠)
Sporty Aunt		1947		Sze-to Dip (司徒秩)
Arrogant Chiu		1948	沙塵超	Yuen Po Wan
This is A Cartoon Era		1948	這是一個漫畫年代	The Society for Art for the People (人間畫會)
Kiddy Cheung		1949	絀路祥	Yuen Po Wan
Miss Lau		1949	柳姐	Yuen Po Wan
Spy Heroes		1949	諜網英雄	Yam Wu Fa, Lo Lik
Wong Chai		1949	王仔	Yuen Po Wan

=== 1950s ===
English name	Alternate or Pinyin Name	Year	Chinese name	Author
New China Little Picture Books		1950s-1960s		Various
World Famous Children's Book Series		1951	世界著名兒童故事叢書	Unknown
Children's Educational Picture Book Collection		1952	兒童教育圖畫叢	Unknown
Children's Healthy Series Literature		1952	兒童益智文庫	Unknown
The Blessed Young Children Magazine		1952	褊幼	Unknown
World Youth Bimonthly Magazine		1952	世界少年半月刊	Unknown
Children's Knowledge Educational Series		1953	兒童知識教育叢書	Unknown
Children's Paradise		1953	兒童樂園	Unknown
Girl with Big Ponytail		1953	大辮女	Bao Ching-cheung
Legend of Heroes from Three Dynasties		1953	三國英雄演義	Ng Gei-ping
Little Friend Bimonthly		1953	小朋友	Lam Siu-tin (林小田), Ho Kwok-lin (何國廉), Liao Bing-xiong (廖冰兄)
Manhua		1953		Chan Chi-dor (陳子多)
So-chau Girl		1953	蘇州姑娘	Bao Ching-cheung (鮑楨祥)
Big Head Boy		1954	大頭仔	Bao Ching-cheung, Bao Dik-cheung (鮑狄祥), Bao Wun-cheung (鮑會祥)
Big Sister Wang		1954	芸姐姐	Bao Ching-cheung, Bao Dik-cheung (鮑狄祥), Bao Wun-cheung (鮑會祥)
Jungle Prince		1954	森林王子	Bao Ching-cheung, Bao Dik-cheung (鮑狄祥), Bao Wun-cheung (鮑會祥)
Little Angeli	Youth Pictorial	1954	小安琪	Bao Ching-cheung, Bao Dik-cheung (鮑狄祥), Bao Wun-cheung (鮑會祥)
Little Bobo	Youth Pictorial	1954	小寶寶	Unknown
Children's Lok-fung Bao		1955	兒童樂鋒報	Alfonso Wong, Cheung Hon-ming (張漢明), Ng Ho-cheung (吳浩昌)
Cry for the Death of a Crazy Man		1955	呼瘋子之死	Lui Yu-tin (雷雨田)
Three Man Going Home		1955	三人歸家	Lui Yu-tin
Cartoons World		1956	漫畫世界	
Children's Corner Pictorial Fortnightly	Little Pilots (Fei-gei Chai)	1956	世界兒童畫報, 飛機仔	Unknown
Children's Literary Collection		1956	兒童文藝叢書	Unknown
Manhua World		1956	漫畫世界	Mak Ching (麥青)
Silver Light Daily: Sunday Color Pictorial		1956	銀燈日報: 星期彩色叢畫刊	
The Voice of Good Companion Pictorial		1956	良友之聲畫報	Unknown
Friends of Children's Bimonthly		1957	兒童之友半月刊	Cheung Yat-keui (張一渠)
Sing Tao Good Children Happy Land		1957	星島好兒童開心地	Unknown
Youth Paradise Bimonthly		1957	少年樂園半月刊	Unknown
Joke Comics		1958	笑話笑畫	Hui Guan-man (許冠文)
Uncle Choi		1958	財叔	Hui Guan-man
Little Friends Pictorial		1959	小朋友畫報	Unknown

=== 1960s ===
English name	Alternate or Pinyin Name	Year	Chinese name	Author
Baby Comics		1960	小漫畫月刊	Wong Chak (王澤), Lee Kwok-yat (李國逸), Lee Sing-cheung (李聲祥), Mak ching
Boy Scout	Siu-Ming	1960	童子軍	Ng Gei-ping
Children's Weekly		1960	兒童畫報	Unknown
Little Companion Pictorial		1960	小良友畫部	Wu Shu-yu (胡樹儒), Tang Chik-kun, Alfonso Wong, Chi Sing
Siu-ming & Siu Sam-ji		1960	小明與小三子	Ng Gei-ping
Caricature Weekly		1961	漫畫周報	Lee Ling-hon (李凌翰)
Children's Pictorial Story Series		1961	兒童圖畫故事叢書	Unknown
Kid's Paradise		1961	小樂園	Alfonso Wong, Wu Shu-yu
Youth Children's Story Series		1961	少年兒童故事叢書	
Atomic Seven		1962	原子七俠	Ho Yat-kwan (何曰君)
Clean-face Conqueror		1962	玉面霸王	Ho Yat-kwan
Children's Story		1962	兒童故事	Unknown
Epoch Comics Weekly		1962	時代漫畫周報	Leung Tak-wah
Flying Black Batman		1962	飛俠黑蝙蝠	Ho Yat-kwan
King Detective		1962	偵探王	Ho Yat-kwan
Little Angel Pictorial Monthly		1962		
New Comics Weekly		1962	新漫畫周報	Tsui Ngai
Super Black Conqueror		1962	蓋世黑霸王	Ho Yat-kwan
Companion Comics	Companion Manhua	1963	良友漫畫	Hui Guan-man, Chan Chi-dor, Mak ching, Lee Ling-hon, Alfonso Wong, Wong Sze-ma (王司馬)
Entertainment News		1963	每日漫畫	Fung Tai-wai
Good Children's Pictorial Bimonthly		1963	好兒童畫報	Unknown
Manhua Daily		1963	漫畫畫報	Mak Ching
Old Master Q		1964	老夫子. 秦先生 AND 大番薯	Alfonso Wong
The Cartoons and Comic Gardens		1964	漫畫樂園	Ng Sheng-gwan, Ng Gei-ping, Lee Sing-cheung (李聲祥)
Electric Pig			電氣小豬	Tsui Yu-on
Dumb Detective Manhua Series			曖偵探漫畫系列	Sung Sam-lung (宋三郎)
Fat Chan, Gentleman, and Brother Ho Manhua		1965	肥陳．大官．何老大	Lee Fan-fu (李凡夫)
New Friends of Children Pictorial Bimonthly		1965	新兒童之友畫報半月刊	Unknown
Old Master Q's Crazy Comics		1965	老夫子黐線漫畫	Alfonso Wong
Radar Pictorial		1965	雷達畫報	Mok Kwan-Ngok (莫君岳), Man Yong
13-Dot Cartoons		1966	十三點	Lee Wai-chun (李惠珍)
Assorted Titles		1966-1972		Various
Black Batman		1966	黑蝙蝠	Dung Fong-yung (東方庸)
Lies of Journey to the West		1966	大話西遊	Tsui Yu-on
Careless Young Master	Careless young Man	1966	鳥龍少爺	Ng Sheng-gwan
Crazy World		1966		Alfonso Wong
Dai-wah and Siu-wah		1966	大華與小華	Lee Shek-cheung
Dummy Seven and Beauty		1966	曖仔七與亞靚	Heung-shan A-wong (香山亞黃)
Movie Martial Art Novel Manhua		1966		Ng Gei-ping (伍寄萍)
Reflective Cave		1966	迴光壁	Ng Gei-ping
Science Fiction Series		1966-1974	柬方庸編繪科學幻想故事	Dung Fong-yung (東方庸)
Tetsujin 28-go		1966	鐵人28	
The Killing Order of Mo-lum		1966	武林勾魂今	Ho Yat-kwan
Handsome Dak		1967	靚仔德	Hui Guan-man
Movie Stars and Comics Magazine		1967	影星與漫畫雜誌	Youth Culture Committee
Father and Ms		1968		Wong Sze-ma
Little Vagabond		1968	小傻仙	Wong Yuk-long (黃玉郎)
MCC Cartoons	Mung Cha Cha Cartoons	1968	MCC 畫集	Fung Siu-ho
New Mr. Wang and Mr. Chu		1968		Mak Man-ching (麥敏青)
The World of E-king Yen		1968	嚴以敬漫畫選集	Yen E-King (嚴以敬)
Happy Family TV Episode Comics		1969		
Solar Lord		1969	小魔神	Wong Yuk-long
The Son of Ultraman		1969	超人之于	Wong Yuk-long (黃玉郎)

=== 1970s ===
English name	Alternate or Pinyin Name	Year	Chinese name	Author
Happy Fruit		1970	開心果	Ng Sheng-gwan (伍尚鈞)
Four People Thematic Caricature		1970	四人專題漫畫	Lam Jong-git, Nam Ying (南嬰), Heung-shan A-wong (香山亞黃), Chau Hang-jok
Little Rascals	Oriental Heroes	1970, 1975	小流氓, 龍虎門	Wong Yuk-long (黃玉郎)
Mr Chu and Aunt Eight		1970	朱先生 AND 八姑	Mak Man-ching (麥敏青)
Sweet and Gentle		1970	嬌滴滴	Tse Ling-ling
Ultraman Pictorial		1970	矇面超人	Mok Kwan-Ngok (莫君岳), Man Yong
1001 Joke Comics		1971	笑話笑畫	Hui Guan-man (許冠文), Ng Kam-hung, Mak Man-ching (麥敏青)
Bruce Lee		1971	李小龍	Seung-gun Siu-bo (上官小寶)
Father and Son		1971		Wong Sze-ma
Grandpa and Granddaughter		1971	兩公孫	Hui Guan-man
Miss Silly		1971	茜莉小姐	Hui Guan-man
Young Couple		1971	歡喜冤家	Hui Guan-man
Father, Ngau-chai, and Ms.		1972	契爺．牛仔．大小姐	Wong Sze-ma
Instant TV		1973	即播電視	Lai Man-fung
Ms. Carefree		1974	傻大姐	Ng Gam-hong
Cartoons News		1975	漫畫通訊	Yuan Yat-muk (袁一木), Mok Wah, Yeung Wai-pong (楊維邦)
Children's TV		1975	兒童 TV	Unknown
Experimental Cartoons		1975	實驗漫畫	Yuan Yat-muk (袁一木), Mok Wah, Yeung Wai-pong (楊維邦)
Happy Together Children's Pictorial		1975	大家樂兒童畫報	Unknown
Hei Bo		1975	喜報	Seung-gun Siu-bo (上官小寶)
Little Baby and Little Po Po		1975	小寶貝	Hui Guan-man
Sang Po		1975	生報	Wong Yuk-long (黃玉郎)
Cute Girl		1976	得意妹	Unknown
Doraemon	Ding Dong	1976	叮噹 / 多啦A夢	
Ching Bo		1977	青報	Seung-gun Siu-bo (上官小寶)
Golden Bo Daily		1977	金報	Wong Chun-lung
Big Brother Sunny		1978	辛尼哥哥	Unknown
Charming		1978	風流	Ma Wing-shing (馬榮成)

=== 1980s ===
English name	Alternate or Pinyin Name	Year	Chinese name	Author
New Wave Manhua Magazine		1980	新浪潮漫畫雜誌	Tony Chan, Ma Wing-shing (馬榮成), Chu Joy-yee, Sham Lak-hung
Humor World		1981		Yeung Wai-pong (楊維邦), Tao Sam, Yat Muk, Zunzi (尊子), Yan Ting-hau, Mok Wah, Au Ching (區晴), Lee Tak-hong
Manhua New Trend		1981	漫畫新潮	Cheung Wai-kit (張韋傑)
Siu-keung Manhua Collection		1981	小強漫畫集	Seung-gun Siu-bo (上官小寶), Seung-gun Siu-keung (上官小強)
2001 Comics Weekly		1982	2001 漫畫周刊	2001 Editorial Board, Chu Jo-yee
Buddha's Palm		1982	如來神掌	Wong Yuk-long (黃玉郎)
Chinese Hero	Blood Sword, Blood Sword Dynasty	1982	中華英雄	Ma Wing-shing (馬榮成)
Drunken Master		1982	醉拳	Wong Yuk-long (黃玉郎)
King Manhua Weekly		1982	漫畫王	
The Dragon God Battle		1982	神龍八部	Various
Tin Lung Comics		1982	天龍報	Various
Ngau-chai		1982	牛仔	Wong Sze-ma
Sing Tao Good Children Happy Land		1982	星島好兒童開心地	Lee Wai-chun (李惠珍), Ting Shui-leung
Sunday Comics		1982	星期日漫畫	Ho Tai-yi, Chu Jo-yee, Tang Pun-bong, Ko Cheung, Fung Chi-ming (馮志明)
Tiger Panther Heroes		1982	虎豹雙雄	Various
Debussy		1983	狄保士	Wong Sze-ma
Gorgeous Susan		1983	靚女蘇珊	Wong Sze-ma
Hai-dai Chau Pictorial		1983	鞋底秋傳畫	Dong Pui-sun
One is Nice		1983	一個嬌	Tou Sam (杜森)
The Hundred Manhua Poems		1983	漫畫詩一百首	Nam Hui-man
Ngau-chai Collection		1983	牛仔	Wong Sze-ma
Manhua by Lee Dak-hong		1984	李建康漫畫	Lee Dak-long
Onion Head Manhua Series		1984	洋蔥頭漫畫系列	Lam Chun-keung
Yuk-long Manhua Biweekly		1984	玉郎漫畫	Kie Man-kin, Wong Yuk-long (黃玉郎)
Theater of 1997		1985	九七劇場	Zunzi (尊子), Ma Long (馬龍), Local Boy (本地小子)
Four Treasures of Dragon Gate		1986	龍門四寶	Cai Zhizhong (蔡志忠)
The World of Lily Wong		1986-2001		Larry Feign
Manhua Zhuang-zi: Natural Sound of a Common Artemisia		1986	漫畫莊子:自然的笛聲	Cai Zhizhong (蔡志忠)
Colored Ngau-chai Selections		1987	牛仔	Wong Sze-ma
Comic World Bimonthly		1987	漫畫世界半月刊	Seung-gun Siu-wai
Proverb Animation Gallery		1987	成語漫畫廊	Unknown
Chiu-yi Sing Comics Collection		1988		Dong Pui-sun
Comics for City Boy		1988	漫畫少年	Hui King-sam (許景森)
Comic Pig		1988	漫畫豬嘜	Wong Kwok-hing (黃國興)
Dagger, Sword, Laugh		1988	刀劍笑	Fung Chi-ming (馮志明)
Fifty Steps		1988		Ma Long (馬龍)
Black Materials Comic Collection		1989	黑材料	Zunzi (尊子)
Children's Daily		1989	兒童日報	Unknown
Colored Ngau-chai Collections		1989	牛仔	Wong Sze-ma
Little Ming Pao Weekly		1989	小明周	Kwok Siu-ming, Mak Ga-bik (麥家碧), Sui Shek, Wong Ging-tsai (黃竟齊)
Manhua Hard and Soft Angel Theater		1989	軟硬漫畫劇場	Ho Kin-chung
Media Tour of Cahiers Du Cinema		1989		Ho Ka-chiu, Jek na-si, TSSW Leung
One Woman Three Markets		1989	一個女人三個墟	Chan Ya (陳也)
Tin Ha	Wind and Cloud, Fung Wan	1989	天下, 風雲	Ma Wing-shing (馬榮成)

=== 1990s ===
English name	Alternate or Pinyin Name	Year	Chinese name	Author
Bat-hoi Bun: The Second Short Works		1990	八開本: 利志達第二短篇作品集	Li Chi-Tak (利志達)
City Children's Weekly		1990	號外兒童周刊	Unknown
Ma Long Political Cartoon		1990		Ma Long (馬龍)
Political Comics Collection		1990	政治漫畫集	Ma Long (馬龍)
Rather Die than Change		1990	死性不改	Yat Mok
Three Little Guys		1990	三個小豆丁	Tou Sam (杜森)
Black Leopard		1991	黑豹列傳	Wan Yat-leung (溫日良), Tang Chi-fai (鄧志輝)
Daily Pictorial		1991	日日漫畫	Unknown
Digimon Adventure/ Adventure 02/ Tamers		?	?	Yuen Wong Yu
Fan Dou Magazine		1991	反斗雜誌	Ma Long (馬龍)
Humorous Cartoons by Ma Long		1991	馬龍幽默漫畫集	Ma Long (馬龍)
Romance of the Three Kingdoms		1991	三國志	Li Zhiqing
The Legend of God of Gamblers		1991	賭聖傳奇	Sze-to Kim-kiu (司徒劍僑), Wing Yan, Man dik, Lau Ding-gin (劉定堅)
The Unbeatable Conman		1991	無敵千王	Various
Tin Ha Pictorial		1991	天下畫集	Cola Boy
The King of Street Fighters		1991	街頭霸王	Hui King-sam (許景森), Lee Chung-hing (李中興)
Steel Warrior Adventures		1991	鐵將縱橫	Khoo Fuk Lung (邱福龍)
Street Warrior		1991	街頭戰士	Chi Man (志文)
Mild Comics		1991		Apink
Youth God of Gamblers		1991	少年賭神	
Black Mask		1992	黑俠	Pang Chi-ming, Li Chi-tat (利志達)
Feel 100%		1992	百分百感覺	Lau Wan Kit
Kong-wu Big Brother		1992	江湖大佬	Lun Yu-kwok (倫裕國), Man Kam-hung
Portland Street		1992	缽蘭街	Lun Yu-kwok (倫裕國), Man Kam-hung
Red Light District		1992	紅燈區	Lun Yu-kwok (倫裕國), Man Kam-hung
Teddy Boy 1/2		1992	古惑仔	Lun Yu-kwok (倫裕國), Man Kam-hung
Transition Period 1991-1992		1992		Zunzi (尊子), Ma Long (馬龍), Yat Mok
100 Caricatures of China, Hong Kong, and Taiwan Politicians		1993	中港台一百政治人物漫像	Zunzi (尊子)
Comic Alley		1993		Seung-gun Siu-keung (上官小強)
Cyber Weapon Z		1993	超神Z	Andy Seto
Double Star Comics		1993	雙星漫畫	Law Wing-hon
Law for Life		1993		Tou Wing-Tak
McMug Manhua Series		1993	麥嘜	Alice Mak, Brian Tse
The Dragon in Prison		1993	監獄威龍	Seung-gun Siu-bo (上官小寶), Ow Man (牛佬)
The Legend of Emperors		1993		Wong Yuk-long (黃玉郎), Khoo Fuk-lung (邱福龍), Wong Yik
Whiz-kids Express Weekly		1993	兒童快報	
Doubled-Faced Man		1994	雙面人	Wong Chun-kei (黃振基), Hau Chung-dong (口中冬)
Grandpa Deng		1994	鄧伯爺	Zunzi (尊子)
Sea Tiger I-III		1994	海虎	Wan Yat-leung (溫日良), Tang Chi-fai (鄧志輝)
Strong Force		1994	強勢	Xu Di-shan (許地山)
Zunzi's Manhua: Hong Kong, China, UK		1994		Zunzi (尊子)
Here Comes Boss Lee		1995		Apink
Man-man Chu, Dak-dak Gao		1995	慢慢化．凸凸交	Lai Tat-wing (黎達榮)
Sam's Manhua Series		1995-2000	阿三漫畫系列	Choa Yat (草日)
The Cat and the People on the Ceiling		1995	天花板上的貓與人	Choa Yat (草日)
The Legend of Love		1995		Ma Long (馬龍)
The Record of the Entertainment Industry		1995	娛樂圈血淚史	Apink
Three Times Seven Equals Twenty-One		1995	三七二十一	Au-Yeung Craig (歐陽應霽)
None of your Cat Business		1996		Choa Yat (草日)
The Assassination of Emperor Qin		1996	剌秦	Li Chi-tat (利志達)
The Record Book of the Transition Period		1996	過渡期事件簿	Ma Long (馬龍)
Weapons of the Gods	Shén Bīng Xuán Qí	1996	神兵玄奇	Wong Yuk-long (黃玉郎)
Yellow Bus		1996	黃巴士	
A Biography of Legislator		1997		Zunzi (尊子)
Grandpa Deng II		1997	鄧伯爺	Zunzi (尊子)
Leung's Saga Series		1998	梁家婦女系列	Choa Yat (草日)
Little Cherry	Xiǎo Yīng Táo	1998	小樱桃	Yang Shangjun (杨尚君)
Mom's Drawer is at the Bottom		1998	媽媽的抽屜在最	Lau Lee-lee (劉莉莉)
Three Households and One Cat		1998	Choa Yat (草日)	
Cat of the House		1999		Choa Yat (草日)
A Special Administrative Region Manhua Magazine		1999		Ma Long (馬龍)
Supreme Cat		1999		Choa Yat
Cat Comes Cat Goes		1999		Choa Yat

=== 2000s ===
English name	Alternate or Pinyin Name	Year	Chinese name	Author
The Ravages of Time		2001–present	火鳳燎原	Chan Mou
Sui Tang Heroes	Heroes of Sui and Tang/Sui Tang Ying Xiong Chuan	2003	隋唐英雄传	Gao Yung
1/2 Prince		2007	二分之一王子	Yu Wo
An Ideal World	Seek Self's World	2006 - 2007	寻找自我的世界	Weidong Chen (story), Chao Peng (illustrator)
DevaShard		2008–present		Zen
What the Master Would Not Discuss	Zi Bu Yu	2008	子不语	Xia Da
Tales of Tarsylia		2008	塔希里亞故事集	Wu Miao
Morning Star of Midland	Mi Te Lan De Chen Xing	2009	米特兰的晨星	Xia Da

=== 2010s ===
English name	Alternate or Pinyin Name	Year	Chinese name	Author
Collapse Of The World As We Know It		2010–present	日渐崩坏的世界	Dashu Jiang
Godzilla Never Speaks	Gesela Bu Shuo Hua	2011	哥斯拉不说话	Xia Da
Year Hare Affair	Na Nian Na Tu Na Xie Shi	2011–present	那年那兔那些事	Lin Chao
Song of the Long March	Chang Ge Xing	2012-2014	长歌行	Xia Da
SQ Begin W/Your Name!	Tamen De Gushi	2014 - present	SQ从你的名字开始	Tan Jiu
Pharaoh's Concubine	Sha Yu Hai Zhi Ge	2015-2018	砂与海之歌	You Shi(novel), Misha (art)
The King's Avatar		2015-2019	全职高手	Hu Dielan (novel), D. LAN (art)
Biao Ren		2015 - present	镖人	Xianzhe Xu
The Daily Life of the Immortal King		2017	仙王的日常生活	Kuxuan
Warm Wedding		2017-2022	入骨暖婚	AC.QQ, Iqiyi, Mkzhan
Release that Witch		2017-present	放开那个女巫	Er Mu (novel), Dr Woodman, Yuè Wén
Here U Are		2017 – 2020	你在这里	D. Jun
Lord of Mysteries		2018-2020	诡秘之主	Cuttlefish That Loves Diving (novel)
Beauty and the West Chamber	Dong Lin Xi Xiang	2018	東鄰西廂	Ruoyejun, Winslow
Heaven Official's Blessing	Tian Guan Ci Fu	2019	天官赐福	Mo Xiang Tong Xiu
Spare Me, Great Lord!	Dawang Raoming	2019-present	大王饶命	The Speaking Pork Trotter (novel)
She Is Still Cute Today		2019 - present	今天的她也是如此可爱	Guo Si Te
My Sweet Girl		2019-2021	不可爱的TA	Zero
Martial Medic		2019-present	医武至尊	diffuse Hollywood, 漫莱坞
Perfect Secret Love: The Bad New Wife is a Little Sweet		2019-present	恰似寒光遇骄阳	Jiong Jiong You Yao (novel and Art)
Reborn to Be a Movie Queen		2019 - 2020	他的夫人超大牌	Hong shu wang, Xiao jiu chi yu
Once More		2019 - 2023	再度与你	Han Xu

=== 2020s ===
English name	Alternate or Pinyin Name	Year	Chinese name	Author
The Lady and the Lion		2020 - 2023	狄奥多之歌	J.N.Gigabit,Ranpo.Y (Art)
Into Her New Life		2020 - 2023	霸道总裁轻点爱	SJCC, xiaoshuixuan
Goddess Emelia Wants to Escape		2021 - 2022	空华绮恋	山見羬,拾肆, 翻翻动漫
She’s So Beautiful		2021	她真漂亮	Diantong
My Secret Crush		2021 - 2022	偷偷藏不住	Zhu Yi
Crossing Egypt: Becoming The Pharaoh’s Bride		2021	穿越埃及：成为王的新娘	XIAO MING TAI JI, 二次元动漫
Legend Of Star General		2021	星甲魂将伝	Lexiang Dongman
The Apple of Five Men's Eye		2022 - 2023	我成了五个大佬的掌心宠	Yuewen Manhua
Eternal Love		2022-present	难哄	Zhu Yi
I Have to Be a Monster		2022 - 2023	我必须成为怪物	BOOM工作室, 炽翊漫画
I’ve Been Licking 90 Billion Gold		2023-2025	我有九千万亿舔狗金	Fanqie Manhua, 两点透视, 你的恐惧很酷, 谢飞机, 阿尔戈斯
Deeply In Love		2023-present	情靡	七猫免费小说, 二喜
I Dominate a Magical Continent With an Industrial Revolution		2024	我在魔法大陆建立工业帝国	巴诺动漫
From Simp to Billionaire: The Rise of a Divine Tycoon		2025-present	不当舔狗后，我成了亿万神豪	Dazui, MifenPink

== Singapore ==
English name	Alternate or Pinyin Name	Year	Chinese name	Author
The Celestial Zone		1999 - 2006	天界无限	Wee Tian Beng

== Taiwan ==
English name	Alternate or Pinyin Name	Year	Chinese name	Author
Melancholic Princess	Ching-Kuo Yüen-Ling	1989	傾國怨伶	You Su-lan
The King of Blaze	Fire King, De Brand Koning	1991	火王	You Su-lan
Steel Rose		2000-2004	鋼鐵玫瑰	Ryan
Ingenuo		1998-?	戀影天使	Ryan
1/2 Prince		2006–present	1/2 王子	Choi Hong Chong
Youth Gone Wild		1996-2001	搖滾狂潮	Nicky Lee
The One		2005–present	獨領風騷	Nicky Lee
Scrolls of Northern City		2010	北城百畫帖	AKRU
Big city, Little Things	Dàchéng xiǎoshì	2015	大城小事	HOM - 鴻
Rites of Reterning	Summer fair temple	2015	神之鄉 上	Zuo Hsuan - 左萱
The Boy from Clearwater	Láizì Qīngshuǐ de Háizi	2020-	來自清水的孩子	Yu Pei-yun (art), Zhou Jian-xin (illustrations)

== Newspapers with manhua ==
English name	Alternate or Pinyin Name	Year	Chinese name	Author
Wah Kiu Daily		1951	華僑日報	Unknown
Sing Tao Daily Pictorial Supplement		1953	星島日報圖畫特刊	Bao Dik-cheung (鮑狄祥), Lee Ling-hon (李凌翰), Chang yat-yim, Mak ching (麥青)
Dai Jung Daily		1967	大公報	Yen E-King (嚴以敬)
Express Daily		1967	決報	Yen E-King (嚴以敬)
Sunday Weekly		1990	星期天周刊	

== Manhua reviews ==
English name	Alternate or Pinyin Name	Year	Chinese name	Author
Cartoonet		1998	漫畫網絡	Au-Yeung Craig (歐陽應霽), Lau Lee-lee (劉莉莉)
Monthly Comic Magazine		1990-1993		Yuan Kin-tao (袁建滔)

== Unsorted ==
- Ying Xiong Wu Lei, a wuxia manhua comics by Ma Wing Shing, based on Ying Xiong Wu Lei of Gu Long
- Warlord, science-fiction manhua by Tang Chi Fai, Wan Yuet Leung, sequel of Sea Tiger I - III.
- Saint a different version of the journey to the West of Sun Wukong and his party, authored by Khoo Fuk Lung
- SNK vs Capcom based on the game SNK vs Capcom
- Young and Dangerous
- Crouching Tiger Hidden Dragon based on the film of the same title
- Heaven Sword & Dragon Sabre based on the book of the same title
- Hero based on the film of the same title
- King of Fighters based on the game King of Fighters
- Return of the Condor Heroes (Legendary Couple) based on the book of the same title
- Digimon: Digital Monsters

== See also ==
- List of Lianhuanhua
