= Crouching Tiger, Hidden Dragon (TV series) =

- Based on: Crouching Tiger, Hidden Dragon by Wang Dulu
- Directed by: Lin Jui Yang; Liang Kai Cheng
- Starring: Chiu Hsin-chih; Jiang Qinqin; Huang Yi; Peter Ho; Chang Chen-kuang
- Music by: Dun Tan
- Original language: Mandarin
- No. of episodes: 34

Production
- Producers: Hui On Jen; Wong Keen Chung
- Running time: 60 minutes per episode (Taiwan); 228 minutes (US)

Original release
- Release: 2001

Crouching Tiger, Hidden Dragon (simplified Chinese: 卧虎藏龙; traditional Chinese: 臥虎藏龍) is a 2001 Taiwanese television series based on the novel by Wang Dulu elaborating in greater detail in comparison to Ang Lee's 2000 film adaptation with similar production values but with a different cast. The series was released in the United States in 2004 as New Crouching Tiger, Hidden Dragon in a two-disc set.

== Plot ==
Yu Jiaolong takes up kung fu with the former rebel master Jade Fox as a way to escape an undesirable arranged marriage, while simultaneously, sword master Li Mu Bai falls in love with Yu Shu Lien when she arrives to avenge the murder of her parents. When the Green Destiny Sword turns up stolen, and the notorious female thief Jade Fox arrives to finish the ordeal, the four become enmeshed in a tangle of adventure, vengeance, and betrayal.

== Cast ==
- Chiu Hsin-chih as Li Mubai
- Jiang Qinqin as Yu Jiaolong
- Huang Yi as Yu Xiulian
- Peter Ho as Luo Xiaohu
- Angus Tung as Meng Sizhao
- Chen Changhai as Yu Rui
- Jiang Lili as Madame Yu

== Reception ==
Unlike the Ang Lee adaptation, which was accepted by most international consumers and became a broad success save for its Asian origins, the television serial was considered low-budget and was criticized for its lack of quality and directing.

Many English reviewers noted it was poorer in comparison to the original, and that its similarities were few and far between, such as the fight scenes being animated strangely and its direct mode of film from its television series being sub-par.

However, some have endorsed its release and support its longer storyline, detailed costumes, and general adherence to the original source material.
