= Lee Wai Chun =

Hong Kong comic artist (c.1939–2020)

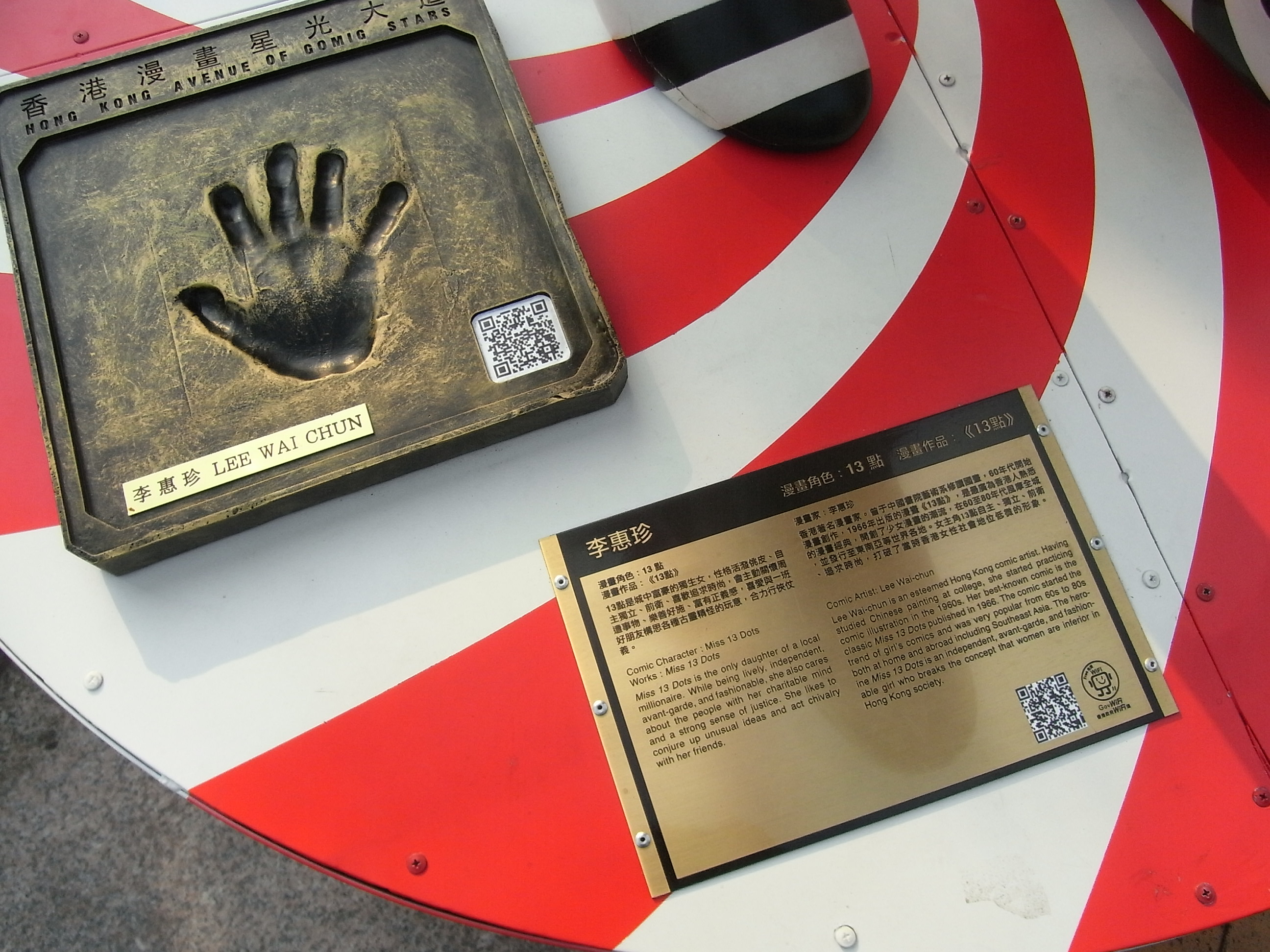
- Lee Wai Chun's handprint on the Hong Kong Avenue of Comic Stars
- Born: 1943; Hong Kong
- Died: August 27, 2020
- Occupation: Comics artist
- Notable work: Miss 13 Dot
- Website: www.miss13dots.com

Lee Wai Chun (Chinese: 李惠珍; 1943 – 27 August 2020) was one of the most successful female Hong Kong comics artists. She is best known for her popular series Sapsaam Dim, known as Miss 13 Dots or 13-Dots Cartoon in English, which follows the adventures of a rich, fashion-oriented teenager. Sapsaam Dim was one of the best selling comics in Hong Kong and Southeast Asia.

== Early life ==
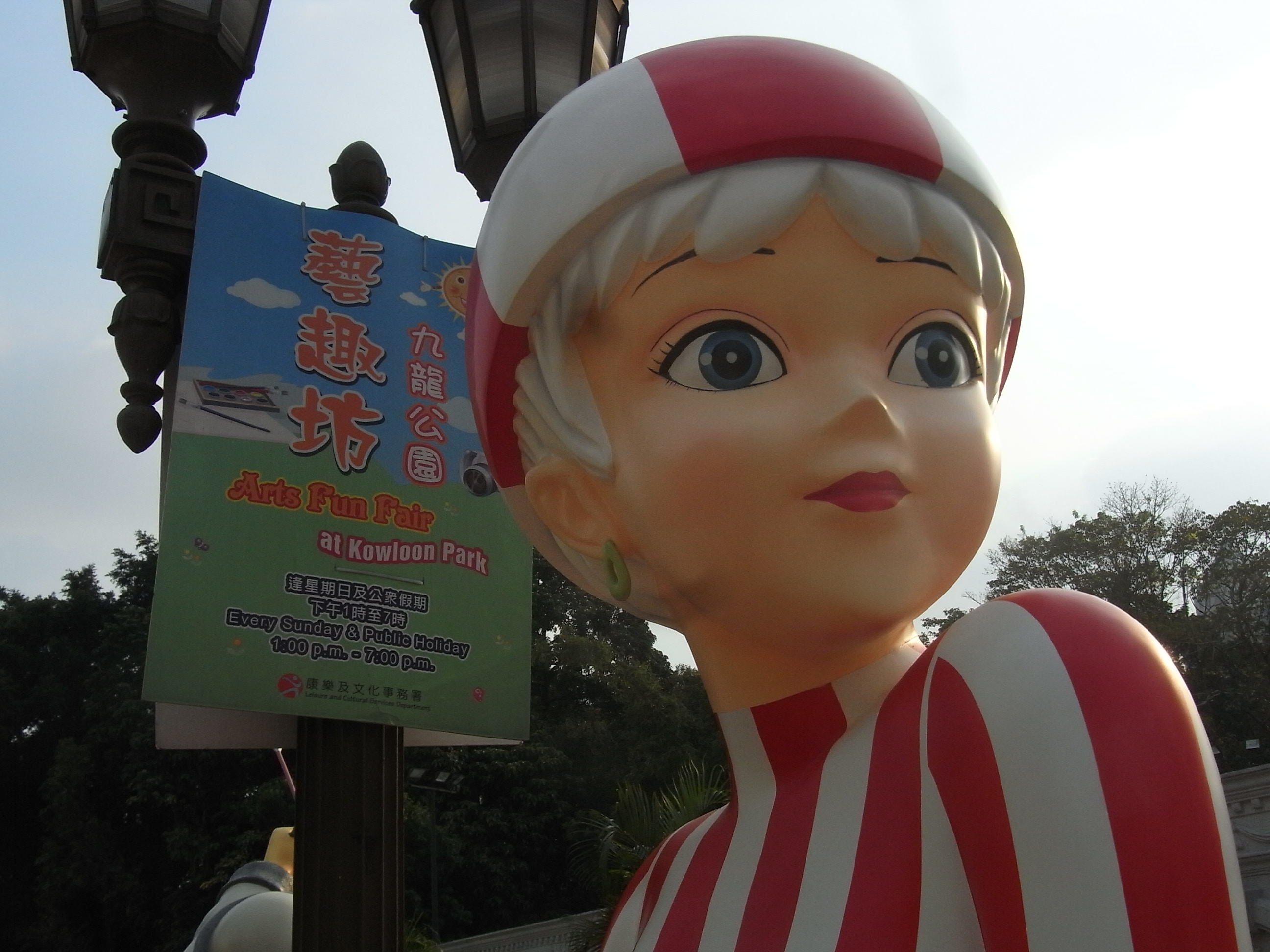
Statue of Sapsaam Dim in Kowloon Park, Hong Kong

Lee recalls her early influences as children's book illustrator Kwan Shan Mei (關山美), comics artist Chan Chi-dor (陳子多), American Don Flowers, creator of the comic strip Glamor Girls, and imported Harvey Comics like Richie Rich and Hot Stuff the Little Devil. Richie Rich would become an inspiration for her most famous creation. As a teenager, she won a 1965 children's fashion design contest sponsored by Tin Tin Daily.

Her first comic book, Fafa Siuze (Miss Flower), was published in March 1965 and lasted eight issues.

Sapsaam Dim (Miss 13 Dots) began in 1966. Zai-se-ti, literally translated as "13 Dots", is Shanghainese slang for frivolous young women. The title character is the daughter of a millionaire banker, Mr. Cash, and a lenient mother, Mrs. Lovely. Like Richie Rich, the series focused on her unrealistic, luxurious adventures. Western fashion was a major focus of the series; it is estimated that the first 28 issues featured over 1700 different pieces of clothing. Readers took copies of the comic to tailors to have imitation outfits made. Miss 13 Dots was intended and received as a feminist icon during a time of change for women in Hong Kong; Lee said "can do what she likes, make her own decisions, have her own ideas." At its peak in the late 1960s and early 1970s, Sapsaam Dim was selling 50,000 copies a month. The series ended in 1980.

In 1978, Lee and her husband were artists on a new children's magazine called Sannei Gogo (Brother Sunny).

In 2005, Lee and the company Dog 9 released a 12-inch Miss 13 Dots doll. She also published a Miss 13 Dots graphic novel, Lyun-lyun Baa-lai (Love in Paris), in February 2008.

== Death ==
Lee died on 27 August 2020 after an illness. She was buried at St. Michael's Catholic Cemetery.

== Miss 13 Dots Comics on Postage Stamps ==
- Hong Kong Post issued a set of six stamps, two stamp sheetlets and associated philatelic products on the theme of "Miss 13 Dots Comics" on December 7, 2022
