= Andy Seto =

Chinese comic artist

Andy Seto 司徒劍僑
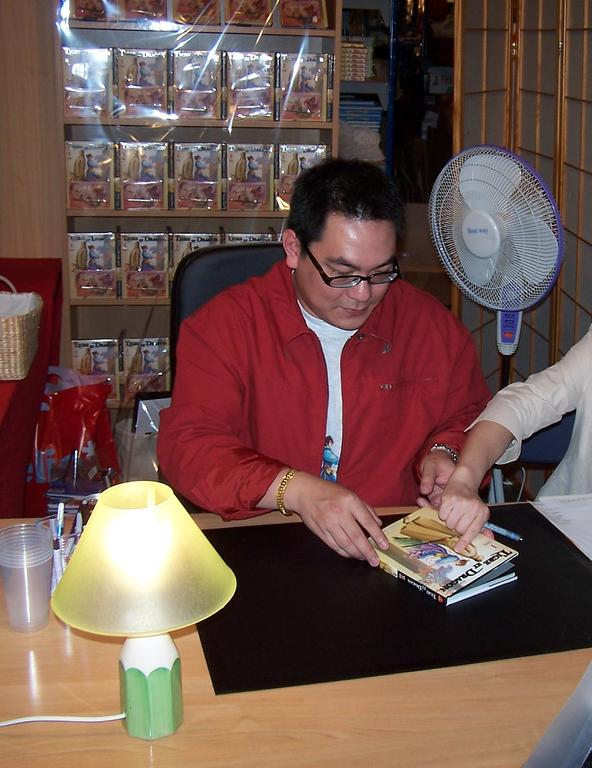
- Seto dedicating Crouching Tiger, Hidden Dragon; 3 July 2004, Hauts-de-Seine, Île-de-France
- Born: Andy Seto Kim Kiu; 3 June 1969 (age 57) Hong Kong
- Area: Artist
- Notable works: Crouching Tiger, Hidden Dragon

Andy Seto
- Traditional Chinese: 司徒劍僑
- Simplified Chinese: 司徒剑侨
- Hanyu Pinyin: Sītú Jiànqiáo
- Yale Romanization: Sītòuh Gimkìuh
- Jyutping: si1 tou4 gim3 kiu4

Andy Seto (司徒劍僑; born 3 June 1969) is a Hong Kong comic artist. Since the 1990s, he has been one of the representative figures of Hong Kong manhua. Many of his works relate to martial arts.

== Biography ==
Seto's works include his main series, Cyber Weapon Z. He has also drawn a graphic novel adaptation of the earlier Crane-Iron Series, the King of Fighters series, and also created a graphic novelisation of Stephen Chow's film Shaolin Soccer. His other work includes Saint Legend, a story about the Eight Taoist Immortals, Story of The Tao, Dog Story, Para Para, The Four Constables, and Sword Kill.

== Bibliography ==
=== Comics ===
- 108 Fighters
- Ape's God
- City of Darkness (comic)
- City of Darkness 2
- Crouching Tiger, Hidden Dragon
- Crouching Tiger, Hidden Dragon II
- Cyber Phoenix
- Cyber Weapon Z
- Cyber Weapon Z II
- Devil United
- Ice Fantasy
- Para Para
- Saint Legend
- Saint Warrior
- SD Cyber Weapon Z (executive producer)
- Shaolin Soccer
- Skyliner
- Skyliner II
- Story of the Tao
- Street Fighter The Comic Series (Stage 10)
- Bu Dong Quan Z
- The Four Constables
- The Four Constables-Secret of the Delirium Dagger
- The Great Helmsman
- The King of Fighters 2000
- The King of Fighters 2000 OX
- The King of Fighters R (editor)
- The King of Fighters Zillion
- Woon Swee Oan Qun Xia Zhuan
- Woon Swee Oan Qun Xia Zhuan 2

=== Art books ===
- Andy Seto Art Work Illustrations
- Andy Seto Art Work Illustrations 2011
- Andy Seto RESTART
- Cyber Weapon Z IMPOSSIBLE
- How to Art
