= Crouching Tiger, Hidden Dragon (novel) =

Novel by Wang Dulu

Crouching Tiger, Hidden Dragon (simplified Chinese: 卧虎藏龙; traditional Chinese: 臥虎藏龍) is a Chinese novel serialized between 16 March 1941, and 6 March 1942, by Wang Dulu on Qingdao Xinmin News, China. It is the fourth work of a pentalogy that are collectively called the Crane Iron Pentalogy.

== Adaptations ==
- The 1959 Taiwanese film Luo Xiaohu and Yu Jiaolong (羅小虎與玉嬌龍) is definitely an adaptation, given its title. This is most likely a lost film.
- Yueh Feng's 1967 Hong Kong film Rape of the Sword is also believed by many, including Yuen Woo-ping (action choreographer for Ang Lee's film), to be an adaptation of the novel, even though it does not explicitly state so, nor is it set in the Qing dynasty. It has been noted that during the early Cultural Revolution, it was impossible for the Shaw Brothers Studio (located in British Hong Kong) to get in contact with Wang Dulu (who lived in mainland China) to acquire the film rights.
- Ang Lee's 2000 film Crouching Tiger, Hidden Dragon is loosely based on this book.
- Crouching Tiger, Hidden Dragon, a 2001 Taiwanese television series, consists of 34 episodes.
- The novel has been turned into a comic series by Andy Seto, translated into English and distributed by ComicsOne.
- Another series is in development by Sony Pictures Television with Jason Ning.
