= Devashard =

2008 comic series

DevaShard
- Cover of Devashard At First Light (2008 Fluid Friction Comics), art by Simon Bisley

Publication information
- Publisher: Fluid Comics
- Schedule: Quarterly
- Format: Ongoing series
- Publication date: June 2008
- No. of issues: 25

Creative team
- Written by: Zen
- Penciller: Keith Burns
- Inker: Ken Cheung
- Letterer: Keith Burns
- Colorist: Johnny Tam

Collected editions
- At First Light: ISBN 988-17-2451-1

DevaShard is a manhua series projected to run for 25 graphic books, each 52 pages long. The first book in the series is DevaShard: At First Light, Fluid Comics' first publication. The story is inspired by the ancient Indian mythological text, the Mahabharata, and focuses on the life story of the character Karna.

== Publication ==
- At First Light (ISBN 9881724511)

== Film adaptation ==
DevaShard was optioned by Vanquish Motion Pictures in 2009. The movie was released in late 2012 in the US, and it was released in the UK, India, and China in early 2013.
