= Kwan Shan Mei =

Singaporean illustrator

- 关山美
- Born: Wong Fang Yan; 1922; Harbin, China
- Died: 8 May 2012 (aged 89–90); Vancouver, Canada
- Known for: Children's book illustrations

Wong Fang Yan (Chinese: 王芳彥; pinyin:Wáng Fāngyàn; 1922 – 8 May 2012), better known by her pseudonym Kwan Shan Mei (Chinese: 关山美; pinyin:Guān Shānměi), was a Chinese-born artist based in Singapore.

She is most well known for her illustrations in children's books and textbooks, including Moongate Collection and Mooty the Mouse series, as well as the Ministry of Education's Primary Pilot Project (PPP) series.

== Early life and career ==
Kwan was born Wong Fang Yan in Harbin, China. Influenced by her politician father who was an avid art collector, she was an understudy for the artist and prominent cartoonist Chow Han Mei in Shanghai for a year.

From 1949, she worked as an illustrator in Hong Kong for Chinese publications, including the Sing Tao Daily, where she was a cartoonist. The Hong Kong film 血染相思谷 (Bloodstained Valleys) was based on her novel.

== Career in Singapore ==
She arrived in Singapore in 1963, starting her career as Chief Figure Artist for the now dissolved Far East Publishing Company.

In 1970, she moved on to illustrate for the Nanyang Siang Pau (Singapore), creating the complementary drawings of Chinese beauties for their daily Chinese classical poems.

She then joined the Educational Publications Bureau, where she illustrated the covers of the PPP readers for Primary One. She simultaneously worked full-time for several other book publishers as an illustrator.

Her most popular illustrated series was created with author Chia Hearn Chek, Moongate Collection – Tales from the Orient (Moongate), which picked up international recognition and was translated into several languages including Urdu, Japanese and Chinese.

Outside of book illustration, she also designed costumes for the Ministry of Culture's National Dance Company in their Monkey God production.

In 1980, she created the drawings made into teakwood carvings that formed the centerpieces of the Dynasty Hotel (now the Marriott Tang Plaza Hotel). Her previous experience in illustrating Chinese tales led to her being chosen to draw the panels of various Chinese legends.

From 1984, Kwan joined the Nanyang Academy of Fine Arts, teaching illustration until her retirement in 1999. She remained a freelance book illustrator in Singapore before she moved to Vancouver, Canada.

Her success as a Singaporean children's book illustrator has been noted to be rare, with the Mooty the Mouse and Moongate series being the only series to "make a splash" among readers, according to then National Library children's services co-ordinator Perumbulavil Vasini. Her popularity may be attributed to the "versatility" of mediums she used in her work, which ranged from pastel colours to traditional Batik and Chinese Ink.

== Death and legacy ==
Kwan died on 8 May 2012, having taken a fall a few months prior.

She has since been honoured in various exhibitions of her works.

In 2018, the first Singapore Comic Festival paid tribute to Kwan, displaying her original manuscripts and illustrations for The Adventures of Mooty. The Asian Festival of Children's Content organised by Singapore Book Council held a retrospective exhibition of Kwan's books and drawings, as well as a public sharing on her life. A continuation of the exhibition later in the year was held at the Singapore Chinese Cultural Center (SCCC).

Since 2020, several of the children's readers and textbooks she illustrated, including Bala on the moon, have been kept and displayed at the permanent SCCC exhibition ‘Singapo人: Discovering Chinese Singaporean Culture’.

== Awards ==
For her illustrations in the Moongate series, Kwan received an honourable mention in the 1973 Biennial of Illustration Bratislava. Locally, she won the two gold and one silver medal in the Best Designed Book category in the Singapore Festival of books over 1974 and 1975.

In 1976, she was the sole inaugural recipient of the National Book Development Council's (now the Singapore Book Council) Book Award in the Children's Books category. Two illustrations from Moongate were selected by the British National Book League to be displayed to an international audience at the Commonwealth Book Fair.

She went on to win the top prizes in 1979 and 1980 in the National Book Development Council's Book Design competition in the Children's Books category, for The Fairy Snail and Pepy and the Peacock respectively.

In 1980, she was awarded with the Grand Prize at the 2nd Noma Concours.

She was posthumously inducted into the Singapore Women's Hall of Fame in 2021 for her contributions to Singapore's arts and culture industry as a "pioneering illustrator".

== Illustrated works ==
- Primary Pilot Project series (1971–1973), by the Ministry of Education
- Moongate Collection – Tales from the Orient series (1972–1983), retold by Chia Hearn Chek
- The Adventures of Mooty (1980), by Jessie Wee
- Folk Rhymes of China (1981), translated by Zhou Bianming and edited by Judy Kong
- The Cockerel's Crest (1982), retold by Chen Chen
- The Stone Junk (1982), by Wen Ying Hua
- Vylee (1983), by Tim Brierley
- The Goddess of Mercy (1986), by Quah May Ling
- Animal Antics series (1986–1989), by Telma Robin
- Crash! Boom! Bang! (1989), by Linda Hughes
- Mountain of Flames (1990), by Alan Chong
- Ada and the Greedy King & other Chinese minorities' folktales (1991), by Li Xue Wei
- Identical Monkey Kings (1991), by Alan Chong
- A Treasury of Asian Folktales (1991), by Linda Gan
- Animal Frolics series (1994), by Allison Amore Lee
- Tang-Song Lyrics (1996), translated by Xu Yuan Zhong
- Ancient Chinese Humour (1996), by Kwan Shan Mei
- Times Asian Folktales (1998), by Christina Hvitfeldt
- The Adventures of Mooty (2009 reprint), by Jessie Wee
- The Adventures of Mooty (2019 commemorative edition), by Jessie Wee
