= The Boy from Clearwater =

Taiwanese graphic novel series

- Traditional Chinese: 來自清水的孩子
Transcriptions
Standard Mandarin
- Hanyu Pinyin: Láizì Qīngshuǐ de Háizi

The Boy from Clearwater (Chinese: 來自清水的孩子, English title in Taiwan: Son of Formosa) is a graphic novel series written by Yu Pei-yun (Chinese: 游珮芸; pinyin: Yóu Pèiyún) and illustrated by Zhou Jian-xin, with Lin King as the translator into English.

The book series began publication in 2020 in Taiwan by Slowork Publishing Co. Ltd. (慢工文化事業有限公司; Màn Gōng Wénhuà Shìyè Yǒuxiàngōngsī). Levine Querido published the English versions. The English version of Book 1 was published in 2023, and the English version of Book 2 was published in 2024.

The original work was written in three languages: Mandarin Chinese, Taiwanese Hokkien, and Japanese. The original version provides Mandarin translations for the content in the other two languages. The English version used direct translations from each of the three languages instead of using an intermediary language.

The main character, a real person, is called Chhòa Khun-lîm in Taiwanese Hokkien and Tsai Kun-lin in Mandarin (Chinese: 蔡焜霖; pinyin: Cài Kūnlín). His name, in the English version, is rendered differently depending on whether Hokkien or Mandarin are used in a conversation. His family uses Hokkien, and in Part 2, during his time at work, he uses Mandarin.

== Background ==
The writer works at National Taitung University's Graduate Institute of Children's Literature as a professor.

== Story ==
The work initially talks about Khun-lim/Kun-lin's childhood. The Japanese government, which controlled Taiwan at the time, drafts him during World War II. Japan loses the war, and the Republic of China takes control of the island. The military police torture and imprison Khun-lim/Kun-lin. In 1960 he leaves prison due to his release. As time passes, Khun-lim/Kun-lin goes into the education sector and advocates for a society without conflict.

The lines thicken and the colors darken between parts 1 and 2 in Book 1, as Khun-lim/Kun-lin is sent to prison.

== Reception ==
In the 2021 Taipei Book Fair, it won the Children’s and Youth Literature Award.

Kirkus Reviews stated that the work has "universal appeal" and that it "embraces freedom and celebrates the human spirit."

Booklist gave starred reviews to the English versions of both Book 1 and Book 2. Reviewer Terry Hong praised the translation in Book 1, which he refers to as "an exemplary tribute to an extraordinary hero." Hong praised Book 2, stating that the author, illustrator, and translator "bear glorious witness to little-known tragic history".

April Spisak, a book reviewer, described the series as "complex, painful".

Reviewer Emilia Packard praised the book, calling it " A story of persistence".
