= Tsai Chih-chung =

Taiwanese comic artist

C. C. Tsai 蔡志忠
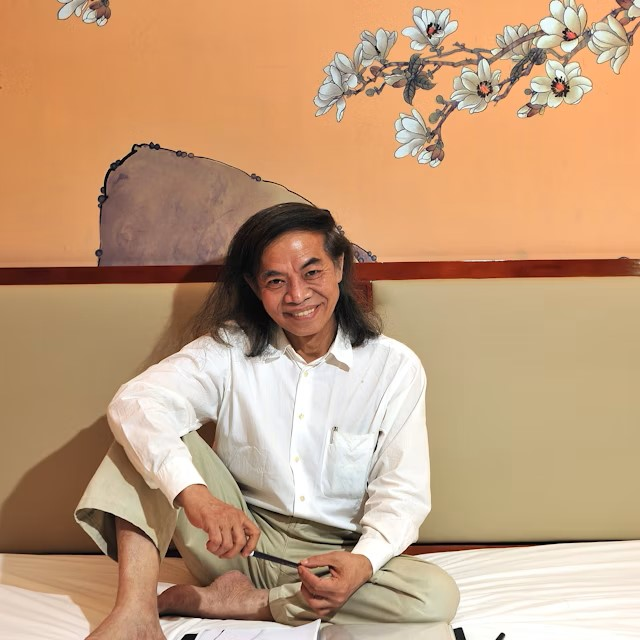
- Born: Tsai Chih-chung 蔡志忠; February 2, 1948 (age 78) Sanjia, Huatan, Zhanghua, Taiwan 台灣彰化縣花壇鄉三家村
- Pseudonym: C. C. Tsai
- Notable works: Zhuangzi Speaks 莊子說; Confucius Speaks 孔子説; Sunzi Speaks 孫子說; Zen Speaks 禪說...
- Awards: Golden Horse, Golden Tripod, Golden Comic, Prince Claus
- Spouse: Yang Wanqiong 楊琬瓊 (divorced)
- Children: Cai Xinyi 蔡欣怡

Tsai Chih-chung
- Chinese: 蔡志忠
Transcriptions
Standard Mandarin
- Hanyu Pinyin: Cài Zhìzhōng
- Bopomofo: ㄘㄞˋ ㄓˋ ㄓㄨㄥ
- Wade–Giles: Ts‘ai^{4} Chih^{4}-chung^{1}
- IPA: [tsʰâɪ ʈʂɨ̂.ʈʂʊ́ŋ]
Yue: Cantonese
- Yale Romanization: Choi Jijūng
- Jyutping: coi3 zi3 zung1
- IPA: [tsʰɔj˧ tsi˧.tsʊŋ˥]
Southern Min
- Hokkien POJ: Chhòa Chì-tiong

Tsai Chih-chung (Chinese: 蔡志忠; Wade–Giles: Ts‘ai^{⁴} Chih^{⁴}-chung^{¹}; C. C. Tsai; Buddhist name Yanyi 延一; born February 2, 1948) is a Taiwanese comic-artist. He is known for his graphical works on Chinese philosophy and literature, most notably on Daoism and Zen Buddhism, which he made accessible and popularized through the use of plain language and engaging illustrations. He also made a name for himself as an award-winning film director, serialized comic strip creator, widely collected painter, champion bridge player, and premiere collector of antique bronze Buddhist statues. He is also a Shaolin monk.

Tsai's books have sold over 500 million copies in 59 countries. He currently resides in Hangzhou, China.

== Biography ==
=== Comic artist ===
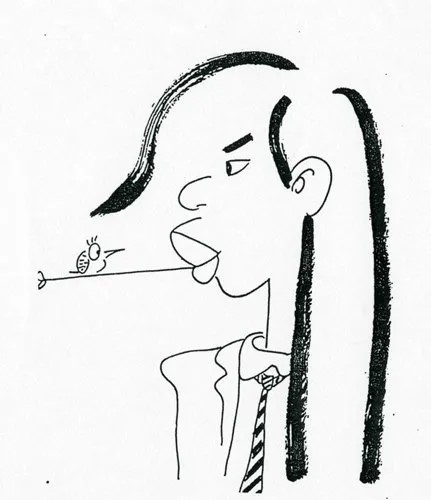
Tsai self-portrait

C. C. Tsai was born on February 2, 1948, in Sanjia, Huatan, Zhanghua, Taiwan 台灣彰化縣花壇鄉三家村. In 1963, when he was 15 years old, he answered an ad for a comic artist and was hired. He dropped out of school and moved to Taipei. Three months later, he moved to the largest comic publishing house in Taiwan, where he anonymously created hundreds of comic books, mostly in the kung-fu genre.

From 1968 to 1971, he fulfilled three years of compulsory military service, during which time he educated himself in art history, color theory, and design. Upon being released from the military, he applied at Kuangchi Program Service (the first independent television production company in Taiwan) and beat out all of the fresh design school graduates for a position as director of television art design. Using KPS's equipment and library, Tsai taught himself the art of animation, and in 1977, he separated from KPS, partnered with Che Gam-Tiu 謝金塗, and established Far Eastern Animation Productions 遠東卡通公司, creating animated ads and shorts. Their first full-length movie, Old Master Cute 七彩卡通老夫子 came out in 1981, based on Hong Kong cartoonist Alfonso Wong's 王澤 Old Master Q 老夫子 comic strip. It was co-directed by Tsai, Che, and Woo Shu-Yue 胡樹儒, was a box-office success, and won the 1981 Golden Horse Award for best full-length animation.

In 1981, Tsai left Far Eastern Animation and started his own company, Dragon Animation 龍卡通, which brought out the full length-animated movie Old Master Cute Part 3 山T老夫子 in 1983, and in 1984 it brought out Black Dragon Courtyard 烏龍院, based on comics by Ao Yu-hsiang 敖幼祥. In 1984, Tsai shut down Dragon Animation to focus on original comic illustrations of his own.

In 1983, Tsai began serializing his own comic strips:

- 1983, Drunken Swordsman 大醉俠 in Crown 皇冠月刊, Oriental Daily News 東方日報 (Hong Kong), and Lianhe Wanbao 聯合晚報 (Singapore)
- 1984, Fat Dragon Crosses the River 飛龍過江 and Traveling Swashbucklers 江湖游俠 in United Daily News 聯合報
- 1984, The Bald Detective 光頭神探 in Min Sheng Daily 民生報, Ming Pao Daily News 明報 (Hong Kong), and Shin Min Daily News 新民晚報 (Singapore)
- 1984, One-Eyed Dragon Master Thief 盜師獨眼龍 in China Times Weekly 時報周刊, Women 女性, Outdoor Activities 野外, Torch of Victory 勝利之光, and Sinchew Daily 星洲日報 (Malaysia).
- 1984, Some of the above were serialized in Japan's Manga Time まんがタイム, Manga Sunday 漫画サンデー, and Manga Life まんがライフ.
- 1986, Heroes of the Marsh 水滸傳 and Journey to the West 西游記38變, both in United Daily News 聯合報 and China Times Weekly 時報周刊.

In 1985, the year he was named one of Taiwan's Ten Outstanding Young Persons, Tsai developed a plan to adapt the major Chinese classics into comic book format. The first was Zhuangzi Speaks 莊子說：自然的簫聲 (1986), which immediately shot up the best-sellers list and stayed at the number 1 spot for 10 months.

Tsai continued his success in 1987 with the following interpretations of classical thought: Laozi Speaks 老子説: 智者的低, Liezi Speaks 例子說：御風而行的哲思, Confucius Speaks 孔子説：仁者的叮嚀, and The New Dao 世説新語：六朝的清談. These were followed in 1988 by: Zen Speaks 禪說：尊者的棒喝, The Platform Sutra 六祖墰經：曹溪的佛唱, The Middle Path 中庸：和諧的人生, Roots of Wisdom 菜根譚：人生的滋味, Book of History 史記：歷史的長城, Higher Learning 大學：博大的學問, and Analects 論語：仁者的諍言. In 1989 came: Han Feizi Speaks 韓非子說：法家的峻言, Mencius Speaks 孟子說：亂世的哲思, Zhuangzi Speaks II 莊子說 II: 自然的簫聲, and Laozi Speaks II: 老子説 II：智者的低於. Sunzi Speaks 孫子說：兵學的先知 was published in 1990.

In 1987, Tsai's books held the top 3 spots of the Taiwan bestseller list. He was the bestselling author in Taiwan in 1987 and 1988.

He also published comedic interpretations of classic literature, such as Journey to the West 西游記 (1987–88), Ghosts and Wizards 聊齋志異 (1988), Outlaws of the Marsh 水滸傳 (1988), and White Snake 白蛇傳 (1990), as well as straightforward versions of the poetry of the Tang and Song dynasties (1989).

Overall, Tsai was instrumental in initiating Taiwan's animation and comics boom that began in the 1980s, providing both expertise and unprecedented creative style.

In 1991, Tsai entered the China market when Joint Publishing 三聯書店 published his 27 volume Classics of China comic book series 中國古籍漫畫系列, with an initial print run of 5 million volumes. Within one year, sales topped 30 million volumes and 60 million by 1998.

By 1991 authorized translations of his books were being published in English, Spanish, Japanese, Czech, and Russian, among other languages in over 20 countries. By 2003, they had been translated into 42 languages.

=== Painter ===
In the late 1980s, Tsai took up traditional Chinese ink-wash painting.

His solo exhibitions include:

- 1991, Lianxin Gallery 連信藝品藝廊, Tainan
- 2014, "Zen Ambience 水墨禅境," Commercial Press 商务印书馆, Beijing, 111 ink-wash paintings
- 2015, "A Colorless World," Nanjing Art University of the Arts Art Gallery 南京艺术学院美术馆, Nanjing
- 2015, "Buddhas and Boddhisattvas 诸佛菩萨, Commercial Press 商务印书馆, 80+ ink-wash paintings
- 2021, "Awakening," Baoan Gallery 宝安画院, Shenzhen
- 2022, "Guanyin," Baoan Gallery 宝安画院, Shenzhen
- 2023, "Five Petals Blossoming," Baoan Gallery 宝安画院, Shenzhen

Prints have been published in his six volume Zen Paintings 蔡志忠水墨說禪.

=== Bridge player ===
Tsai is a champion bridge player, with over 90 trophies from competitions in Taiwan, Hong Kong, and North America, including 1991 champion of British Columbia, Canada.

=== Collector ===
In 1991, Tsai began collecting gold and bronze Buddhist statuary. By 1997, his collection included 2,000 items. The collection had increased to 3,300 by 2003 and to about 4,000 by 2020.

Exhibitions:

- 1997, Taiwan National Museum of History 國立歷史博物館, Taipei, 240 works
- 2012, Fo Guang Shan Buddha Memorial 佛光山佛陀纪念馆, Kaohsiung, Taiwan, 108 works. Exhibition volume: The Beauty of Buddhism: Exhibition of C. C. Tsai's Buddhist Statuary 法相之美 : 蔡志忠金銅佛造像收藏展.

=== Family ===
Cai's father was the village calligrapher. In 1976, Tsai married Yang Wanqiong 楊琬瓊. They have one daughter.

=== Other ===
In 2020, Tsai took vows as a Buddhist Monk at Shaolin Temple.

== C. C. Tsai Museums ==
The first museum dedicated to C. C. Tsai opened in Hangzhou in March 2024. A second opened in Gaoping 高平, Shanxi 山西 in June 2024.

== Honors and awards ==
- 1981: Golden Horse Award 金馬獎 for Best Animated Film (Taiwan)
- 1985: Jaycees Republic of China Ten Outstanding Young Persons Award 中華民國十大傑出青年
- 1992: Republic of China Individual Contributions to Social Education
- 1999: Prince Claus Award for Visual Art / Reexamining History (Netherlands)
- 2004: Tsai's work appeared in the R.O.C.'s first set of stamps featuring comic illustrations.
- 2006: Tsai was honored by Shaolin Monastery with a stone monument dedicated to his work. At the time, only he and the great adventure novelist Jin Yong had been honored in this way.
- 2011: Golden Comic Award for Lifetime Achievement (Taiwan)
- 2013: Golden Tripod Award 金鼎獎 for Best Non-Fiction (Taiwan)
