= Tales of Tarsylia =

塔希里亞故事集
- Genre: Science fiction Fantasy; Martial arts
- Author: Wu Miao
- Publisher: JIELI PUBLISHING HOUSE; Yeren Publishing House Ltd.; online –; bilibili
- Other publishers: (France) URBAN CHINA
- Original run: 2006
- Volumes: 10(Tales of Tarsylia); 1(Tarsylia Chronicles of Magic); 1(Art Book); 1(Album of painting); 2(Traditional Chinese version); 5(French version); 5(Collector's Edition)

Tales of Tarsylia (Chinese:塔希里亞故事集 ) is a silhouette-style Manhua (Chinese-language comic) created by Chinese cartoonist Wu Miao(吳淼) and is his masterpiece. The Chinese version of Trade paperback of Tales of Tarsylia is published by JIELI PUBLISHING HOUSE(接力出版社) and Yeren Publishing House Ltd.(野人文化股份有限公司), while the French version of Tales of Tarsylia is published by URBAN CHINA.

The sequel to Tales of Tarsylia is Tarsylia Chronicles of Magic (塔希里亞魔法編年史).

== Features ==
The art style of Tales of Tarsylia and the entire series is dominated by silhouettes. All stories in the entire series take place in the fictional "Tarsylia world", and the content has profound implications. Formally, it is an anthology series, and the plot and characters of each story are often related.

== History ==
Tales of Tarsylia is a comic created by Chinese cartoonist Wu Miao. He began serializing it on the Internet at the end of 2006. The first volume of Trade paperback was published by JIELI PUBLISHING HOUSE in 2007. As of 2017, nine Trade paperbacks have been published, of which the first one has two versions.

In 2010, one of the core stories in Tales of Tarsylia, "The destination of silence"(沉默歸宿), was licensed to Beijing Infinite World Co., Ltd.(北京趣遊天際網路技術有限公司) for online game adaptation.

The 2013 Traditional Chinese characters edition of Trade paperback is published by Yeren Publishing House Ltd.

The 2015 French version of Tales of Tarsylia Trade paperback is published by URBAN CHINA.

In 2017, Taplion Games(北京盘狮科技有限公司) launched the mobile games - Tarsylia Tactics (契約勇士－塔希里亞戰記).

== Game ==
In the world of Tarsylia, "Glyph"(詭法棋), a duel game popular among wizards, was launched in the PNP (print and play) version after the rules were revised by the author Wu Miao. The game is included in the second volume of the Chinese version of Trade paperbacks.

In 2015, the author Wu Miao cooperated with Canada's Bluepiper studio Ltd. to launch "Tales of Tarsylia-Glyph Chess"(塔希里亞-詭法棋), which is in the form of a Board game. In 2018, after revision, a new version of the board game "Tales of Tarsylia-Glyph Chess II" was launched.

On October 14, 2020, Glyph Chess released a digital version of the game on Steam.

== Merchandise ==
=== Clothes ===
- Sbreth T-shirt

The Sbreth T-shirt(斯布雷斯T卹) is an extended product of Sbreth, the famous character in "Tales of Tarsylia". It is available in black and navy blue. The front uses the classic Sbreth portrait drawn by the author Wu Miao himself, with text. The product was released in July 2019.

- Tarsylia T-shirt

Tarsylia T-shirt(塔希里亞文化衫) is a summer T-shirt with the theme of "Tales of Tarsylia". There are 4 patterns in total, both for men and women. The patterns are all designed by the author Wu Miao himself, and the products began to be sold publicly on Taobao in March 2009.

- Makrov Family Hoodie

Makrov Family Hoodie(馬克羅夫家族衛衣) is one of the merchandise of "Tales of Tarsylia". It is a men's and women's Hoodie, made of 100% cotton, with a black base and red prints on it. The pattern on the chest is "M" and the pattern on the back is the crest of the Makrov family. The pattern was designed by the author Wu Miao himself and was publicly sold on Taobao in October 2019.

=== Badges ===
- Aimedal Badge(艾梅達爾徽章)
- Shadow Wizard Badge(陰影法師徽章)
- Yago Badge(雅戈徽章)
- Sbreth Badge(斯布雷斯徽章)

=== Others ===
- Immortality Pillow(不死之身抱枕)
- Doro Doll(多羅娃娃)
- Sbreth Garage kit(斯布雷斯手辦)
- Star Fortune Tarot - Major Arcana(星運塔羅牌-大阿爾卡納)

== Worldview ==
=== World ===
The word "Tarsylia"(塔希里亞) means "Dual World"(雙重世界) in the Saint-Elf language(聖精靈語). Tarsylia in the broad sense refers to the entire known world, including Material Realm, Upper Realm, Lower Realm and other Realms(界域); Tarsylia in the narrow sense only refers to the Material Realm.

==== Realms ====
"Realm"(界域) refers to each Realm that exists in Tarsylia. All Realms are generated through "Three seeds"(三個種子).

Upper Realm

The Upper Realm(上層界), called Heaven(天界) and Paradise(天堂) by Humans, is located in the outer layer of the world of Tarsylia. This Realm comes from the part of The Third Consciousness(第三意識). The corresponding Realm is Lower Realm(下層界).

The gods reside in this realm.

Material Realm

Material Realm(主物質界) originates from The Second Consciousness(第二意識), its material basis comes from the Four Elemental Realms(四大元素界), and the energy comes from the Four Spiritual Realms(四大靈界).

There are two inhabited lands in Material Realm, namely Gaspar continent(加斯帕爾大陸) and Lakdossa Island(拉克多薩島), and the rest are all seas.

Lower Realm

The Lower Realm(下層界), also known as Abyss(深淵), also known as Hell(地域) by Humans, is located in the outer layer of the world of Tarsylia. It is a Realm formed by the No. 1 Splitting individual "Ring of Cause and Effect-Balsetu"(因果之環巴爾瑟圖茲) of The First Consciousness(第一意識) as its ontology. Devils(魔鬼) live in this Realm.

Four Spiritual Realms

"Four Spiritual Realms"(四大靈界) is the collective name for the four Realms: Rainbow-Islands Spirit Realm(彩虹群島), Jungle Spirit Realm(大叢林), Endless Sea Spirit Realm(無盡海), and Myriadvalleys Crypt Spirit Realm(萬壑地穴). Spiritual Realms can only be reached in spirit form, and each Spiritual Realm is inhabited by powerful Gods who represent nature. After the death of a creature that believes in Nature Gods(自然神靈), the soul will go to one of the Spiritual Realms to be transformed into "Life Force"(生命力) and re-infused into Tarsylia.

- Rainbow-Islands Spirit Realm – Rainbow-Islands Spirit Realm is one of the Four Spiritual Realms and is composed of countless small islands floating in the rainbow. It is the territory of Sky God(天空之神) and Snow Queen(雪花女王).
- Jungle Spirit Realm – Jungle Spirit Realm is one of the Four Spiritual Realms. The Silence(無語者) governs this place. Its shape is a primitive and wild boundless forest. It is the destination of the souls of Orcs(獸人) and other jungle creatures(叢林生物).
- Endless Sea Spirit Realm – The Endless Sea Spirit Realm is one of the Four Spiritual Realms. It is the endless Sea Of Life(生命之海), the destination of the souls of Aquatic organisms(水生生物) after death. It is rumored that the souls of Dragons(龍) will also go here after death - so far it is just a rumor. The Great Whale Shida(巨鯨西達) rules this place.
- Myriadvalleys Crypt Spirit Realm – Myriadvalleys Crypt Spirit Realm is one of the Four Spiritual Realms. It is a dark cave that contains the mountains. It is the destination of the souls of creatures such as Dwarf, Gnome, and Giant(巨人) after death. The Mountains God Toca(群山之神銅卡) rules this place, and it is rumored that at the bottom of the cave, Araton's soul is being reborn.

Four Elemental Realms

Four Elemental Realms(四大元素界) include Earth Elemental Realm(土元素界), Air Elemental Realm(風元素界), Water Elemental Realm(水元素界) and Fire Elemental Realm(火元素界). Four Elemental Realms not only provide the basic materials composed of Material Realm(主物質界), but are also the Realm where Elemental creatures(元素生物) live.

- Earth Elemental Realm – The Earth Elemental Realm(土元素界) is one of the Four Elemental Realms and is the Realm inhabited by Earth elemental creatures(土元素生物).
- Air Elemental Realm – The Air Elemental Realm(風元素界) is one of the Four Elemental Realms and is the Realm inhabited by Air elemental creature(風元素生物).
- Water Elemental Realm – The Water Elemental Realm(水元素界) is one of the Four Elemental Realms and is the Realm inhabited by Water elemental creature(水元素生物).
- Fire Elemental Realm – The Fire Elemental Realm(火元素界) is one of the Four Elemental Realms and is the Realm inhabited by Fire elemental creature(火元素生物).

=== Country ===
Gaspar Empire

The Gaspar Empire(加斯帕爾帝國), referred to as the Empire(帝國), was a huge empire that once unified the Humans, but gradually declined at the end of The second epoch(第二紀). The third epoch(第三紀), its territory is only the overseas Lakdossa Island(拉克多薩島), and the only remaining fortress on the Gaspar continent - Brokenblade Fortress (斷刃要塞), whose symbol is the Black Crown(黑色王冠).

Shidal Trade Federation

Shidal Trade Federation(希達爾商貿聯邦) is a federal country controlled by the Big Four business group(四大商團). It can also be referred to as Shidal(希達爾), Trade Federation(商貿聯邦) or Federation(聯邦). The Shidal Trade Federation is based on trade, so it attaches great importance to credibility and seeks the greatest benefits by any means necessary. The Shidal Trade Federation controls much of the central part of the Gaspar continent(加斯帕爾大陸), and its symbol is the Golden Dagger(金色短劍).

Skavia

Skavia(斯卡維亞), also known as the Country Of Plateau(高原之國), is a poor and decadent country ruled by the incompetent Barpres family, whose symbol is Gray Wolf Head(灰色狼頭). Most of Skavia's territory is located on the Tonar Plateau(托納爾高原) in the southern part of the continent. The terrain is difficult and easy to defend but difficult to attack. The capital is Keladit(凱拉蒂特).

=== Species ===
There are many creatures in the world of Tarsylia, which are divided into humanoids(類人生物), Demi-humans(亞人生物), Transfinites(超限生物), Magical Creatures(魔法生物), Elemental creatures(元素生物), etc.

==== Humanoids ====
Human

Humans are one of the intelligent species living in the Material Realm(主物質界). They are the product of a compromise between the Upper Realm(上層界), Lower Realm(下層界) and Jungle Spirit Realm(大叢林), and almost dominate the entire Material Realm.

Human(人類)'s close relative is Barbarian(蠻人).

- Barbarian

Barbarians are one of the intelligent species in the Material Realm. They are close relatives of humans, but are physically stronger than humans. The barbarians living in Northland(北地) and Skavia(斯卡維亞) were called Northland Barbarians(北地蠻人) and Mountain Barbarians(高山蠻人) respectively.

Elf

Elf(精靈) is one of the intelligent species of the Material Realm, derived from Angel(天使) who was transformed to adapt to the density of the Material Realm. Some of them still firmly believe in Heavenly Father(天父) and live in Emerald Paradise(翡翠天堂). In order to emphasize their specialness, they call themselves "Saint-Elf"(聖精靈). Nowadays, the term "Elf" refers more to the Elfs scattered throughout Tarsylia except Saint-Elf. They are not recognized by Saint-Elf and most of them live a life without fighting against the world.

- Saint-Elf

Saint-Elf is one of the intelligent species in the Material Realm and one of the main branches of Elf. Because this community settled in Elf Holy Mountain(精靈聖山) more fanatically adheres to the belief of the Heavenly Father and considers itself superior to human beings, it calls itself "Saint-Elf". This has also led to the current term "Elf", which more refers to other Elfs scattered throughout Tahilia except Saint-Elf.

Dwarf

Dwarf(矮人) is one of the intelligent species living in the Material Realm and has an independent kingdom in Northland. There are 627 orthodox Dwarf Clanships, and meetings are held in the capital - Light of Araton(阿拉頓之光). In addition, those ethnic groups or individuals who do not participate in the Dwarf Council(矮人會議) and are scattered outside are called Wild-Dwarf(野矮人).

- Wild-Dwarf

Wild-Dwarf refers to the Dwarf tribe scattered outside the Dwarven Kingdom(矮人王國) and does not belong to the 627 Clanships of the Dwarf Council. They are unwilling to accept the call of Araton(阿拉頓) and go to the capital - Light of Araton, preferring to stay in their existing homeland. In addition, orthodox Dwarfs who are exiled from the Clanship will also be called Wild-Dwarfs.

Gnome

Gnomes(侏儒) are an intelligent species living in the main material world. They are famous for possessing a variety of "Black Technology". They mostly live in Foureyes Grape City(四眼葡萄城).

Goblin

Goblin(地精) is one of the intelligent species living in the Material Realm and has a strong reproductive capacity. Goblin are usually considered to have low intelligence and insufficient force, but they are willing to obey the strong, so they are often used as slaves by various powerful races. Goblin also has many subspecies such as Hobgoblin(大地精), Bugbear(熊地精), etc. Among them, Bugbear is stronger and smarter, while Silvercup Winery(白銀杯酒廠)'s Silvercup-Goblin(銀杯族地精) has a level of civilization that far exceeds other Goblin.

Demonborn

Demonborn(魔裔) is the common name for people with demon blood, also known as "Tiefling"(泰夫林). Wizards have verified that the earliest Demonborn was born through "Primitive Symbiosis"(原始共生), but it is still a mystery who carried out such a large-scale cultivation ceremony in ancient times.

Vampire

"Vampire"(吸血鬼) is not a race, but a collective name for a class of creatures transformed through Vampirepact(吸血鬼契约). Humans believe that vampires are the sharp teeth of Archaic-Titan(始祖泰坦) "Devour the Tyrant"(吞噬暴君), but this is just a legend.

==== Transfinites ====
Gods

Gods(眾神) are conscious creatures(意識體) who live in the Upper Realm and originated from The Third Consciousness. Gods strengthen themselves by absorbing the souls of believers, and rely on the believers' devout faith to exert power in the Material Realm. If certain boundaries are crossed and power is pursued by any means, Gods will fall and eventually transform into Demons(惡魔).

Devil

Devils(魔鬼) are conscious creatures that live in the Lower Realm, originating from The First Consciousness(第一意識). In the Age of Chaos(混亂時代), the Gods called them Lnfiltrator, and in the Age of Gods(眾神時代), the church deliberately confused them with "Demons".

Demon

The earliest Demons(惡魔) were mainly fallen gods, including "God of Radiance"(光輝之神) and "God's Punisher - Arbas"(神罰者阿爾巴斯), etc., who fell late in the First Creation War(第一次創世戰爭). After the Second Creation War(第二次創世戰爭), the power of Demons gradually rose, attracting the attention of Gods and Devils.

== Characters ==
=== Four Elites ===
Refers to the four apprentices of Axaros(艾克薩羅斯) in The third epoch. Although they often appear together, their relationship with each other is complicated.

The title "Four Elites"(四傑) does not exist in the story. It first appeared in the author Wu Miao's reply on the blog.

Name	Chinese	Species	Profession	Introduction
Palka Iraldov	帕爾卡·伊拉爾多夫	Human	Wizard	Palka Iraldov is the adopted son and student of Axaros, one of the Four Elites, and the inventor of Sourcesymbol theory(源符理論) and Magic-Rail theory(法軌理論). He has unparalleled talent in magic, but is unknown as a Wizard. He gave up his identity as a Wizard because he fell in love with Princess Tillis(蒂麗斯公主) and spent the rest of his life as an ordinary nobleman, but in the end he failed to win the heart of his lover.
Aimedal Astrick	艾梅達爾·阿斯特里克	Human	Wizard	Aimedal Astrick is Axaros' apprentice and one of the Four Elites. He succeeded as president of the Tarsylia Wizard Guild(塔希里亞法師協會) after Yago's death and renamed it the "Alliance of Magic(術法同盟)" the following year. He also serves as the dean of Blue Academy(藍院), where he mainly teaches Illusion type magic(幻術類魔法) courses. Aimedal actually manages Rainbow City(彩虹城) and the Alliance of Magic, and is Tarsylia's most legendary Grand Wizard in modern times.
Barney Sbreth	巴尼·斯布雷斯	Human	Wizard	Sbreth is Axaros' apprentice and one of the Four Elites. He assisted Yago in managing Rainbow City and worked hard to unify the various Wizard factions in Tarsylia. However, after Yago's death, he left Rainbow City and founded a new magical school of thought - "Shadow"(陰影) based on the apprentices and wizards of Rainbow City's Einherjar Academy(英靈學院). For which he is known as the Lord of Shadows(陰影之主).
Yago Bell	雅戈·貝爾	Human	Wizard; Businessperson	Yago Bell is Axaros' apprentice and one of the Four Elites. He has long assisted in handling Wizard Tower(法師塔)'s logistics and external affairs, and is Axaros' confidant. After the death of Axaros, he took over as the president of the Tarsylia Wizard Guild. After 11 years in office, the Wizards all liked to call him "Mediocre Yago"(庸人雅戈).

== Publishing books ==
=== Art Book ===
Tales of Tarsylia: Secret Codex

Tales of Tarsylia: Secret Codex (Chinese:塔希里亞故事集.秘典) is an art book from the fantasy comic series Tales of Tarsylia written by Chinese cartoonist Wu Miao. It is also a special issue for the 10th anniversary of the publication of the series.

Volumes	(China) JIELI PUBLISHING HOUSE		
Volumes	Book cover	Sale date	ISBN
1		January 1, 2020	ISBN 978-7-5448-6338-4

=== Album of painting ===
Tarsylia 15th Anniversary Art Collection

Volumes	(China) JIELI PUBLISHING HOUSE		
Volumes	Book cover	Sale date	ISBN
1		December 1, 2021	ISBN 978-7-5448-7426-7

=== Trade paperback ===
Tales of Tarsylia

Volumes	(China) JIELI PUBLISHING HOUSE		
Volumes	Book cover	Sale date	ISBN
1		November 1, 2007	ISBN 978-7-5448-0028-0
2		January 1, 2009	ISBN 978-7-5448-0553-7
3		January 1, 2010	ISBN 978-7-5448-1072-2
4		November 1, 2010	ISBN 978-7-5448-1554-3
5		January 1, 2012	ISBN 978-7-5448-2281-7
6		June 1, 2013	ISBN 978-7-5448-2960-1
7		May 1, 2014	ISBN 978-7-5448-3375-2
8		July 1, 2015	ISBN 978-7-5448-4016-3
9		December 1, 2016	ISBN 978-7-5448-4637-0
10		April 1, 2020	ISBN 978-7-5448-6337-7

Tarsylia: A Collection of Magical Silhouette Stories (Tales of Tarsylia)

Tarsylia: A Collection of Magical Silhouette Stories (Chinese:塔希里亞：魔幻剪影故事集) is the Traditional Chinese version of the Chinese comic - Tales of Tarsylia, published by Yeren Publishing House Ltd.

Volumes	(Taiwan) Yeren Publishing House Ltd.		
Volumes	Book cover	Sale date	ISBN
1		September 25, 2013	ISBN 9789865830540
2		January 28, 2014	ISBN 9789865723040

Légendes de Tarsylia

Légendes de Tarsylia is the French version of the Chinese comic - Tales of Tarsylia, published by URBAN CHINA.

Volumes	(France) URBAN CHINA		
Volumes	Book cover	Sale date	ISBN
1		June 12, 2015	ISBN 978-2372590105
2		October 9, 2015	ISBN 978-2372590112
3		January 22, 2016	ISBN 978-2372590167
4		June 17, 2016	ISBN 978-2372590273
5		July 7, 2017	ISBN 978-2372590334

Tarsylia Chronicles of Magic

Tarsylia Chronicles of Magic (Chinese:塔希里亞魔法編年史) is a new chapter that opens after the chapter of Tales of Tarsylia ends.

Volumes	(China) JIELI PUBLISHING HOUSE		
Volumes	Book cover	Sale date	ISBN
1		June 1, 2023	ISBN 978-7-5448-8139-5

Tales of Tarsylia - Collector's Edition

Volumes	(China) JIELI PUBLISHING HOUSE		
Volumes	Book cover	Sale date	ISBN
1		June 1, 2020	ISBN 978-7-5448-6427-5_1
2		June 1, 2020	ISBN 978-7-5448-6427-5_2
3		June 1, 2020	ISBN 978-7-5448-6427-5_3
4		June 1, 2020	ISBN 978-7-5448-6427-5_4
5		June 1, 2020	ISBN 978-7-5448-6427-5_5
