= Wang Dulu =

Chinese novelist (1909–1977)

Wang Dulu Xiaoyu (Chinese: 霄羽)
- 王葆祥
- Born: Wang Baoxiang; 1909; Beijing, China
- Died: 12 February 1977 (aged 68); Tieling, China
- Occupation: Editor / Writer
- Spouse: Li Danquan (Chinese: 李丹荃) (m. 1935)
- Children: 3
- Relatives: Wang Shianshen (Chinese: 王先生) (father)
- Writing career
- Pen name: Wang Dulu (Chinese: 王度廬)
- Language: Chinese
- Years active: 1931 – August 1945
- Genre: Wuxia

Wang Baoxiang (Chinese: 王葆祥; 1909 – 12 February 1977) was a Chinese mystery, science fiction, and wuxia romance novelist who wrote under the pseudonym Wang Dulu (simplified Chinese: 王度庐; traditional Chinese: 王度廬). Wang is also known by the courtesy name Xiaoyu (Chinese: 霄羽).

In the West he is best known for his series of interlinked novels, the Crane-Iron Series, which includes Crouching Tiger, Hidden Dragon. The novel has been adapted to film and television several times, most notably the award-winning film adaptation of the same name directed by Ang Lee.

== Early life ==
Wang was born in 1909 in Beijing to a poor family of Bannerman background. (His ancestors were ethnic Han Chinese adopted into the Manchu Eight Banners.) He worked as an editor for a newspaper agency, and as a clerk for a merchant association before becoming a writer. He is reported to have been self-educated. However, he graduated high school in 1924, and worked infrequently as a teacher until he moved to Beijing in 1931. He also worked as freelance editor and journalist.

He and Li Danquan were married in 1935. They had three children. Some sources credit Li as working as journalist or editor at Minyabao (Chinese: 民意报), a daily newspaper, where Wang also worked.

== Career ==
Wang wrote more than twenty novels from 1931 to 1949, though some sources attribute as many as fifty novels to him. Most of his earlier works were detective and mystery novels.

He began writing wuxia novels after moving to Qingdao, sometime before 1938. From 1939 to 1949, Wang produced as many as thirty-six wuxia novels.

=== Crane-Iron Series ===
Wang's most popular works are collectively referred to as the Crane-Iron Series (Chinese: 鶴鐵系列), named after the first characters in the titles of the first and last installments in the series. The series' five novels chronicle the struggles of four generations of youxia (simplified Chinese: 游侠; traditional Chinese: 遊俠), often translated as wandering heroes. Each novel contains elements which link it with the others.

Portions or possibly all of the novels may have been serialized. The following titles are arranged in internal chronological order rather than by their publication date:

1. Crane Startles Kunlun (Chinese: 鶴驚崑崙, serialized title Chinese: 舞鶴鳴鸞記 1940–1941)
2. Precious Sword, Golden Hairpin (Chinese: 寶劍金釵, serialized title Chinese: 寶劍金釵記 1938–1939; collected edition 1939)
3. Sword Force, Pearl Shine (Chinese: 劍氣珠光, serialized titled Chinese: 劍氣珠光錄 1939–1940; collected edition 1941)
4. Crouching Tiger, Hidden Dragon (Chinese: 臥虎藏龍, serialized title Chinese: 臥虎藏龍傳 1941–1942; collected edition 1948)
5. Iron Knight, Silver Vase (Chinese: 鐵騎銀瓶, serialized title Chinese: 鐵騎銀瓶傳 1942–1944; collected edition 1948)

Crane Startles Kunlun was written third, after Sword Force, Pearl Shine, and serialized under the title Dancing Crane, Singing Luan (Chinese: 舞鶴鳴鸞記). The official website of actress Michelle Yeoh includes an English-language summary of the series.

=== Translations ===
The two first volumes were translated into French, and published by Calmann-Lévy. As of 2025, no official English language translations of his novels exist. However, there is a manhua series of the same name (and a second, revised edition), created by Andy Seto. The plot of the manhua departs substantially from the novels.

An unofficial English translation of Crane Startles Kunlun was released in November 2017 by Worlds in Translation. They started working on an unofficial translation for Precious Sword, Golden Hairpin in December 2017, though there hasn't been any updates since the third part of the third chapter was released in December 2019.

=== Adaptations ===
Ang Lee's 2000 film adaptation, Crouching Tiger, Hidden Dragon, included elements from other books in the Crane series, and also took liberties with the novel it was based on. The changes emphasized the romantic relationships between the protagonists from the novel. The film was also pitched as a martial-arts adaptation of Sense and Sensibility by Jane Austen.

In 2013, The Weinstein Company announced an English-language adaptation of Iron Knight, Silver Vase was in development, with Ronny Yu attached to direct. The film was later renamed Crouching Tiger, Hidden Dragon: Sword of Destiny, and principal photography began in August 2014, with Yuen Woo-ping as director.

== Later life and death ==
After the Chinese Civil War, Wang was assigned to work as a school teacher by Communist leaders, who labelled him an "old literati". He was forbidden from producing new works. Following his retirement, possibly around 1966, he was labelled a "reactionary literati", thus the Communist Party punitively sentenced him to farm labor.

He died from an unknown illness on 12 February 1977. Prior to his death he made several attempts to return to his wife and family who were living in Shenyang.

In 1999, Wang's widow Ms. Li Dan Quan met with Ang Lee and Michelle Yeoh during the production of Crouching Tiger, Hidden Dragon.

== See also ==
- Gu Long
- Jin Yong
- Liang Yusheng
