= Here U Are =

Chinese webcomic

- Manhua English cover of Here U Are volume 1
- Genre: Boys' love
- Author: D Jun
- Illustrator: D Jun
- Publisher: Dongman Entertainment Corp
- English publisher: Aloha Comics (print); Line Webtoon (online)
- Other publishers: Line Manga (Japanese)
- Magazine: Dongman Manhua
- Original run: November 22, 2017 – December 22, 2020
- Collected volumes: 8
- Anime television series
- Directed by: Tomoe Makino
- Written by: Aiki Kawamura
- Music by: Shinya Kiyozuka
- Studio: Rouseact
- Licensed by: Crunchyroll

Here U Are is a Chinese boys' love manhua that was released as a webtoon and written and illustrated by D Jun. It was serialized via Dongman Entertainment Corp's Dongman Manhua platform from November 2017 to December 2020, with the individual chapters being collected and published into eight volumes. It is also published in Japan by Line Manga. The manhua has been published in English by Aloha Comics and Line Webtoon. An anime television series adaptation produced by Rouseact has been announced.

== Plot ==
Yang Yu, a sociable and self-assured university student, meets Huan Li, a tall, reserved, and taciturn freshman, while helping with the orientation of new students. After a negative first impression and a series of misunderstandings, the two begin to spend more time together and discover new facets of each other, gradually developing a romantic relationship.

== Characters ==
Yang Yu
Voiced by: Yūki Inoue
Huan Li
Voiced by: Ryōta Suzuki

== Media ==
=== Manhua ===
==== Volumes ====
No.	Original release date	Original ISBN	English release date	English ISBN
1	August 4, 2023	978-6-26-720171-8	July 1, 2024	978-1638380214
2	August 4, 2023	978-6-26-720185-5	January 1, 2025	978-1638380306
3	December 13, 2023	978-6-26-736216-7	August 16, 2025	978-1638380511
4	December 13, 2023	978-6-26-736217-4	June 15, 2026	978-1638380733
5	February 29, 2024	978-6-26-736245-7	—	—
6	February 29, 2024	978-6-26-736246-4	—	—

=== Anime ===
An anime television series adaptation was announced during Crunchyroll's panel at Anime Expo in July 2026. The series is produced by Rouseact and directed by Tomoe Makino, with Aiki Kawamura writing series scripts, Asami Hayakawa designing the characters, and Shinya Kiyozuka composing the music. Crunchyroll will stream the series.
