= Cyber Weapon Z =

Hong Kong manhua and animated TV series

- Cover of Cyber Weapon Z vol. 1 (1993), art by Andy Seto

超神Z Chāo shén Z
- Genre: Martial arts, science fiction
- Author: Chris Lau
- Illustrator: Andy Seto
- Publisher: Freeman (Hong Kong)
- English publisher: NA: Tokyopop
- Other publishers: Tonkam (Canada, France, Switzerland)
- Original run: 1993
- Volumes: 10

Cyber Weapon Z (Chinese: 超神Z; pinyin: Chāo shén Z) is a manhua series adapted into a 3D-CG Chinese animation TV series in Hong Kong.

== Background ==
In 1990, Andy Seto joined the Freeman publication label, where he took on drawing manhua and other comics. In 1993 he started the 10 volume Cyber Weapon Z manhua series with writer Chris Lau in Hong Kong. The story also ran as a 3D animation series in 1995. Though much of the success did not begin until a French comic company, Tonkam, republished the comic in Europe where it became more popular. Andy's style is heavily influenced by Yoshikazu Yasuhiko, who animated Venus Wars.

== Story ==
For 1000 years, the men have understood the importance of the capacity and the economic stakes. Now, they live quietly thanks to an almost perfect social structure, and it is because of this way of life that physical faculties of the man do not evolve. They begin to deteriorate little by little. Park Iro and Anling are two newcomers with Southern Shaolin, one of the sections of martial arts of the most famous school of combat: the Monastery of Shaolin. The purpose of this school is to give rise to a new human race by developing to the maximum physical capacities of the students. As of the night of their arrival, an unknown force attacks the temple and awake Molitofu, a demon locked up 10 years before by the Luba general.
