= Crouching Tiger, Hidden Dragon =

2000 film by Ang Lee

- Hongkongese theatrical release poster
- Traditional Chinese: 臥虎藏龍
- Simplified Chinese: 卧虎藏龙
- Hanyu Pinyin: Wòhǔ Cánglóng
- Directed by: Ang Lee
- Screenplay by: Wang Hui-ling; James Schamus; Tsai Kuo-jung
- Based on: Crouching Tiger, Hidden Dragon by Wang Dulu
- Produced by: Bill Kong; Hsu Li-kong; Ang Lee
- Starring: Chow Yun-fat; Michelle Yeoh; Zhang Ziyi; Chang Chen; Lang Sihung; Cheng Pei-pei
- Cinematography: Peter Pau
- Edited by: Tim Squyres
- Music by: Tan Dun
- Production companies: Columbia Pictures Film Production Asia; Edko Films; Zoom Hunt Productions; China Film Co-production Corp.; Asia Union Film & Entertainment; Good Machine International
- Distributed by: Sony Pictures Classics (North America); Columbia TriStar Film Distributors International (Hong Kong, Taiwan and selected territories)
- Release dates: 18 May 2000 (Cannes); 7 July 2000 (Taiwan); 8 July 2000 (China); 13 July 2000 (Hong Kong); 8 December 2000 (United States)
- Running time: 120 minutes
- Countries: China; Hong Kong; Taiwan; United States
- Language: Mandarin
- Budget: US$17 million
- Box office: US$214 million

Crouching Tiger, Hidden Dragon
- Traditional Chinese: 臥虎藏龍
- Simplified Chinese: 卧虎藏龙
Transcriptions
Standard Mandarin
- Hanyu Pinyin: Wòhǔ Cánglóng
- Wade–Giles: Wohu Ts'anglung
- Yale Romanization: Wòhhu Tsánglúng
- IPA: [wôxù tsʰǎŋlʊ̌ŋ]
Yue: Cantonese
- Yale Romanization: Ngohfó Chòhnglùhng
- Jyutping: Ngo^{6}fu^{2} Cong^{4}lung^{4}
- IPA: [ŋɔ̀ːfǔː tsʰɔ̏ːŋlȕːŋ]

Crouching Tiger, Hidden Dragon (Note: simplified Chinese: 卧虎藏龙; traditional Chinese: 臥虎藏龍; pinyin: Wòhǔ Cánglóng) is a 2000 wuxia film (Note: Attributed to multiple sources:) directed by Ang Lee and written for the screen by Wang Hui-ling, James Schamus, and Tsai Kuo-jung. It is based on the Chinese novel of the same name, serialized between 1941 and 1942 by Wang Dulu, the fourth part of his Crane-Iron Series. It stars Chow Yun-fat, Michelle Yeoh, Zhang Ziyi, Chang Chen and Cheng Pei-pei in the leading roles. Set in 18th-century Imperial China, the plot follows two master warriors, Li Mu Bai (Chow) and Yu Shu Lien (Yeoh), who are faced with their greatest challenge when the treasured Green Destiny sword is stolen by the mysterious thief Jen Yu (Zhang).

The three producers credited with launching the project include Bill Kong, L.K. Hsu and Ang Lee. They represent two local companies, Edko Films Ltd (Hong Kong) and Zoom Hunt International Production Co Ltd (Taiwan). A multinational venture, the film was made with a budget of US$17 million, and was produced by Edko Films and Zoom Hunt Productions in collaboration with China Film Co-productions Corporation and Asian Union Film & Entertainment for Columbia Pictures Film Production Asia in association with Good Machine International. The film premiered at the Cannes Film Festival on 18 May 2000, and was theatrically released in the United States on 8 December. With dialogue in Standard Chinese, subtitled for various markets, Crouching Tiger, Hidden Dragon became a surprise international success, grossing $213.5 million worldwide. It grossed US$128 million in the United States, becoming the highest-grossing foreign produced film in American history. The film was the first non–English-language film to break the $100 million mark in the United States.

Universally acclaimed by critics, Crouching Tiger, Hidden Dragon won over 40 awards and was nominated for 10 Academy Awards in 2001, including Best Picture, and won Best Foreign Language Film, Best Art Direction, Best Original Score, and Best Cinematography, receiving the most nominations ever for a non–English-language film at the time; the record was later tied by Roma, and broken by Emilia Pérez. The film also won four BAFTAs and two Golden Globe Awards, each of them for Best Foreign Film. For retrospective years, Crouching Tiger is often cited as one of the finest wuxia films ever made and has been widely regarded as one of the greatest films of the 21st century.

== Plot ==
In 1778, Qing dynasty China, Li Mu Bai is a renowned Wudang swordsman, and his friend Yu Shu Lien heads a private security company. Shu Lien and Mu Bai have long had feelings for each other, but because Shu Lien had been engaged to Mu Bai's close friend Meng Sizhao before his death, Shu Lien and Mu Bai feel bound by loyalty to Meng Sizhao and have not revealed their feelings to each other. Mu Bai, choosing to retire from the life of a swordsman, asks Shu Lien to give his fabled 400-year-old jian sword "Green Destiny" to their benefactor Sir Te in Beijing. Long ago, Mu Bai's teacher was killed by Jade Fox, a woman who sought to learn Wudang secrets. While at Sir Te's place, Shu Lien meets Yu Jiaolong, or Jen, who is the daughter of the rich and powerful Governor Yu and is about to get married.

One evening, a masked thief sneaks into Sir Te's estate and steals the Green Destiny. Shu Lien intercepts the thief and chases the culprit across the grounds and rooftops of Sir Te's compound, but the thief escapes after Shu Lien is distracted by a dart shot at her by an unknown source. Shu Lien and Sir Te's servant Master Bo trace the theft to Governor Yu's compound, where Jade Fox had been posing as Jen's governess for many years. Soon after, Mu Bai arrives in Beijing and discusses the theft with Shu Lien. Master Bo makes the acquaintance of local police inspector Tsai and his daughter May, who have come to Beijing in pursuit of Fox. Fox challenges the pair and Master Bo to a showdown that night.

Following a protracted battle, the group is on the verge of defeat when Mu Bai arrives and outmaneuvers Fox. Fox reveals she killed Mu Bai's teacher because he would sleep with her but refuse to take a woman as a disciple, and she felt it poetic justice for him to die at a woman's hand. Just as Mu Bai is about to kill Fox, the masked thief reappears and helps her. Fox kills Tsai before fleeing with the thief (who is revealed to be Jen). After seeing Jen fight Mu Bai, Fox realizes Jen had been secretly studying the Wudang manual. Fox is illiterate and could only follow the diagrams, whereas Jen's ability to read the manual allowed her to surpass her teacher in martial arts.

At night, a bandit named Lo breaks into Jen's bedroom and asks her to leave with him. In the past, when Governor Yu and his family were traveling in the western deserts of Xinjiang, Lo and his bandits raided Jen's caravan and Lo stole her comb. She pursued him to his desert cave to retrieve her comb. However, the pair soon fell in love and had sex. Lo eventually convinced Jen to return to her family, though not before telling her a legend of a man who jumped off a mountain to make his wishes come true. Because the man's heart was pure, his wish was granted and he was unharmed, but flew away never to be seen again. Lo has come now to Beijing to persuade Jen not to go through with her arranged marriage. However, Jen refuses to leave with him.

Later, Lo interrupts Jen's wedding procession, begging her to leave with him. Shu Lien and Mu Bai convince Lo to wait for Jen at Mount Wudang where he will be safe from Jen's family, who are furious with him. Jen runs away from her husband on their wedding night before the marriage can be consummated. Disguised in men's clothing, she is accosted at an inn by a large group of warriors; armed with the Green Destiny and her own superior combat skills, she very easily emerges victorious.

Jen visits Shu Lien, who tells her Lo is waiting for her at Mount Wudang. After an angry exchange, the two women engage in a duel. Shu Lien is the superior fighter, but Jen wields the Green Destiny and destroys each weapon Shu Lien wields. However, Shu Lien defeats Jen with a broken sword. When Shu Lien shows mercy, Jen wounds Shu Lien's arm. Mu Bai arrives and pursues Jen into a bamboo forest, where he offers to take her as his student. Jen agrees if he can take Green Destiny from her in three moves. Mu Bai takes the sword in only one move, but Jen goes back on her word, and Mu Bai throws the sword over a waterfall. Jen dives after the sword and is rescued by Fox. Fox puts Jen into a drugged sleep and places her in a cavern, where Mu Bai and Shu Lien discover her. Fox suddenly attacks them with poisoned needles. Mu Bai mortally wounds Fox, only to realize that one of the needles has hit him in the neck. Before dying, Fox confesses that her goal had been to kill Jen because Jen had hidden the secrets of Wudang's fighting techniques from her.

Contrite, Jen leaves to prepare an antidote for the poisoned dart. With his last breath, Mu Bai finally confesses his love for Shu Lien. He dies in her arms as Jen returns. Shu Lien forgives Jen, telling her to go to Lo and always be true to herself. The Green Destiny is returned to Sir Te. Jen goes to Mount Wudang and shares a night with Lo. The next morning, Lo finds Jen standing on a bridge overlooking the edge of the mountain. In an echo of the legend that they spoke about in the desert, she asks him to make a wish. Lo wishes for them to be together again, back in the desert. Jen leaps from the bridge, falling into the mists below.

== Cast ==
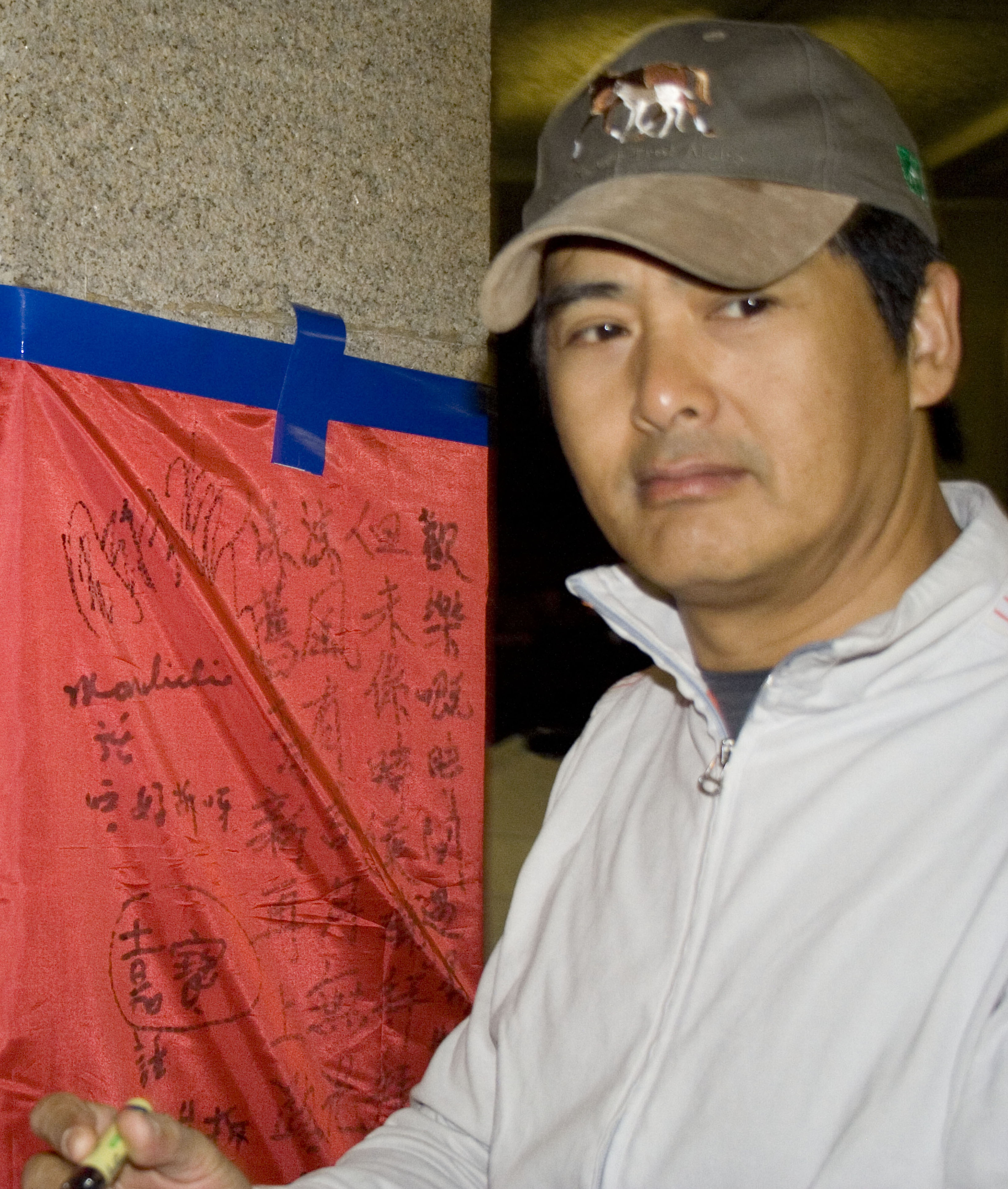
Actor Chow Yun-Fat who portrayed Li Mu Bai

Credits from British Film Institute:

- Chow Yun-fat as Li Mu Bai (李慕白, Lǐ Mùbái)
- Michelle Yeoh as Yu Shu Lien (俞秀蓮, Yú Xiùlián)
- Zhang Ziyi as Jen Yu (玉嬌龍, Yù Jiāolóng)
- Chang Chen as Lo "Dark Cloud" Xiao Hou (羅小虎, Luó Xiǎohǔ)
- Lang Sihung as Sir Te (貝勒爺, Bèi-lèyé)
- Cheng Pei-pei as Jade Fox (碧眼狐狸, Bìyǎn Húli)
- Li Fazeng as Governor Yu (玉大人, Yù Dàrén)
- Wang Deming as Inspector Tsai (蔡九, Cài Jiǔ)
- Li Li as Tsai May (蔡香妹, Cài Xiāng Mèi)
- Hai Yan as Madam Yu (玉夫人, Yù Fūren)
- Gao Xi'an as Bo (劉泰保, Liú Tàibǎo)
- Huang Suying as Aunt Wu (吳媽, Wú Mā)
- Zhang Jinting as De Lu (德祿, Dé Lù)
- Du Zhenxi as Uncle Jiao (焦大爺, Jiāo Dà-Yé)
- Li Kai as Gou Jun Pei (魯君佩, Lǔ Jūn Pèi)
- Feng Jianhua as Shining Phoenix Mountain Gou (魯君雄, Lǔ Jūn Xióng)
- Ma Zhongxuan as Iron Arm Mi (米大鏢, Mǐ Dà Biāo)
- Li Bao-Cheng as Flying Machete Chang (飛刀常, Fēi Dāo Cháng)
- Yang Yongde as Monk Jing (法廣和尚, Fǎ Guǎng Héshang)

== Themes and interpretations ==
=== Title ===
The title "Crouching Tiger, Hidden Dragon" is a literal translation of the Chinese idiom "臥虎藏龍" which describes a place or situation where there are undiscovered, talented, or extraordinary individuals hidden from view. It warns people to never underestimate anyone, as great strength and potential often hide beneath an unassuming facade. It derives from the ancient poem, "Composed While Visiting the Newly Created Mountain Landscape of the Duke of Heyang", by the Chinese poet Yu Xin (513–581). It reads, "暗石疑藏虎，盤根似臥龍": "Hidden rocks seem to harbor tigers; coiled roots resemble a crouching dragon." "Crouching Tiger, Hidden Dragon" relates largely to the film's two characters, Lo Xiaohu and Yu Jiaolong, but it also alludes to the larger martial world, full of unknown dangers, undiscovered geniuses, and concealed heroes. Linguistically, the phrase can be regarded as a combination of "a crouching tiger" and "a hidden dragon", referring to both the major characters and the Jianghu's secret brilliance. Symbolically, the tiger signifies the unchanging, shadowy yin: Lo Xiaohu remains a bandit throughout, never truly changing. The dragon, on the other hand, represents the active and bright yang. Yu Jiaolong, previously a cloistered noblewoman compelled to hide her actual identity, gradually exposes her strength and rebellion. She begins by snatching the Green Destiny sword in disguise, intending to master the Xuanpin sword technique, and eventually dares to reveal her identity and enter the martial world alone—fearlessly confronting danger, causing havoc in public, and challenging even the most fearsome fighter. On another level, the Chinese idiomatic phrase is an expression referring to the undercurrents of emotion, passion, and secret desire that lie beneath the surface of polite society and civil behavior, which alludes to the film's storyline.

=== Gender roles ===
The success of the Disney animated feature Mulan (1998) popularized the image of the Chinese woman warrior in the west. The storyline of Crouching Tiger, Hidden Dragon is mostly driven by the three female characters. In particular, Jen is driven by her desire to be free from the gender role imposed on her, while Shu Lien, herself oppressed by the gender role, tries to lead Jen back into the role deemed appropriate for her. Its female characters are central to both the action scenes and the narrative conflicts. While the wuxia pian and later kung fu films are often male-centered genres, Ang Lee’s film shifts much of the action and narrative force toward women such as Jen Yu, Yu Shu Lien, and Jade Fox. This focus makes the film a subversive moment in the gender history of the genre, although its feminist meaning remains ambiguous because the women characters still struggle within the rules of jianghu and Chinese patriarchal tradition. Additionally, scholars have argued that Jen Yu's rebellion against arranged marriage and social expectations reflects broader tensions between female autonomy and patriarchal authority in traditional Chinese society.

=== Poison ===
Poison is also a significant theme in the film. The Chinese word "毒" (dú) means not only physical poison but also cruelty and sinfulness. In the world of martial arts, the use of poison is considered an act of one who is too cowardly and dishonorable to fight; and indeed, the only character who explicitly fits these characteristics is Jade Fox. The poison is a weapon of her bitterness and quest for vengeance: she poisons the master of Wudang, attempts to poison Jen, and succeeds in killing Mu Bai using a poisoned needle. In further play on this theme by the director, Jade Fox, as she dies, refers to the poison from a young child, "the deceit of an eight-year-old girl", referring to what she considers her own spiritual poisoning by her young apprentice Jen. Li Mu Bai himself warns that, without guidance, Jen could become a "poison dragon".

=== China of the imagination ===
The story is set in 1778, during the 43rd year of the reign of the Qianlong Emperor of the Qing dynasty (1644–1912). This date is only mentioned in the film on documents written in Chinese on screen, never explicitly pointed out. Lee sought to present a "China of the imagination" rather than an accurate vision of Chinese history. At the same time, Lee also wanted to make a film that Western audiences would want to see. Thus, the film is shot for a balance between Eastern and Western aesthetics. Some scholars have interpreted this approach as a strategy that enabled the film to appeal simultaneously to Western audiences seeking an imagined China and Chinese audiences familiar with wuxia traditions.

== Production ==
The film was adapted from the novel Crouching Tiger, Hidden Dragon by Wang Dulu, serialized between 1941 and 1942 in Qingdao Xinmin News. The novel is the fourth in a sequence of five. In the contract reached between Columbia Pictures, Ang Lee and Hsu Li-kong, they agreed to invest US$6 million in filming, but the stipulated recovery amount must be more than six times before the two parties will start to pay dividends. Production involved five different countries, Ang Lee produced the film through United China Vision, a Taiwanese company he created with fellow producers Bill Kong (Edko Films in Hong Kong) and Hsu Li Kong (Zoom Hunt Productions in Taiwan). Lee's company created a subsidiary in the British Virgin Islands and a limited-liability corporation in New York. The privately owned Asia Union Film and Entertainment and the state-run China Film Co-Production Corporation, two mainland Chinese companies were brought in to help. Once location filming and Beijing studio shooting were completed, the soundtrack was recorded in Shanghai, post-production looping took place in Hong Kong, and the film was edited and completed in New York.

=== Casting ===
Shu Qi was Ang Lee's first choice for the role of Jen, but she turned it down.

Jet Li (李连杰) was Ang Lee's original choice to play the lead role of Li Mu Bai in Crouching Tiger, Hidden Dragon. However, Li declined the role in order to fulfill a personal commitment to his partner, Nina Li, who was pregnant at the time. He had promised to take time off from acting to care for her during the pregnancy. As a result, he turned down the opportunity despite the film's international potential. Li later stated that his decision was based on prioritizing family over career. The story of his personal sacrifice reportedly inspired elements of the 2001 film Kiss of the Dragon.

=== Filming ===
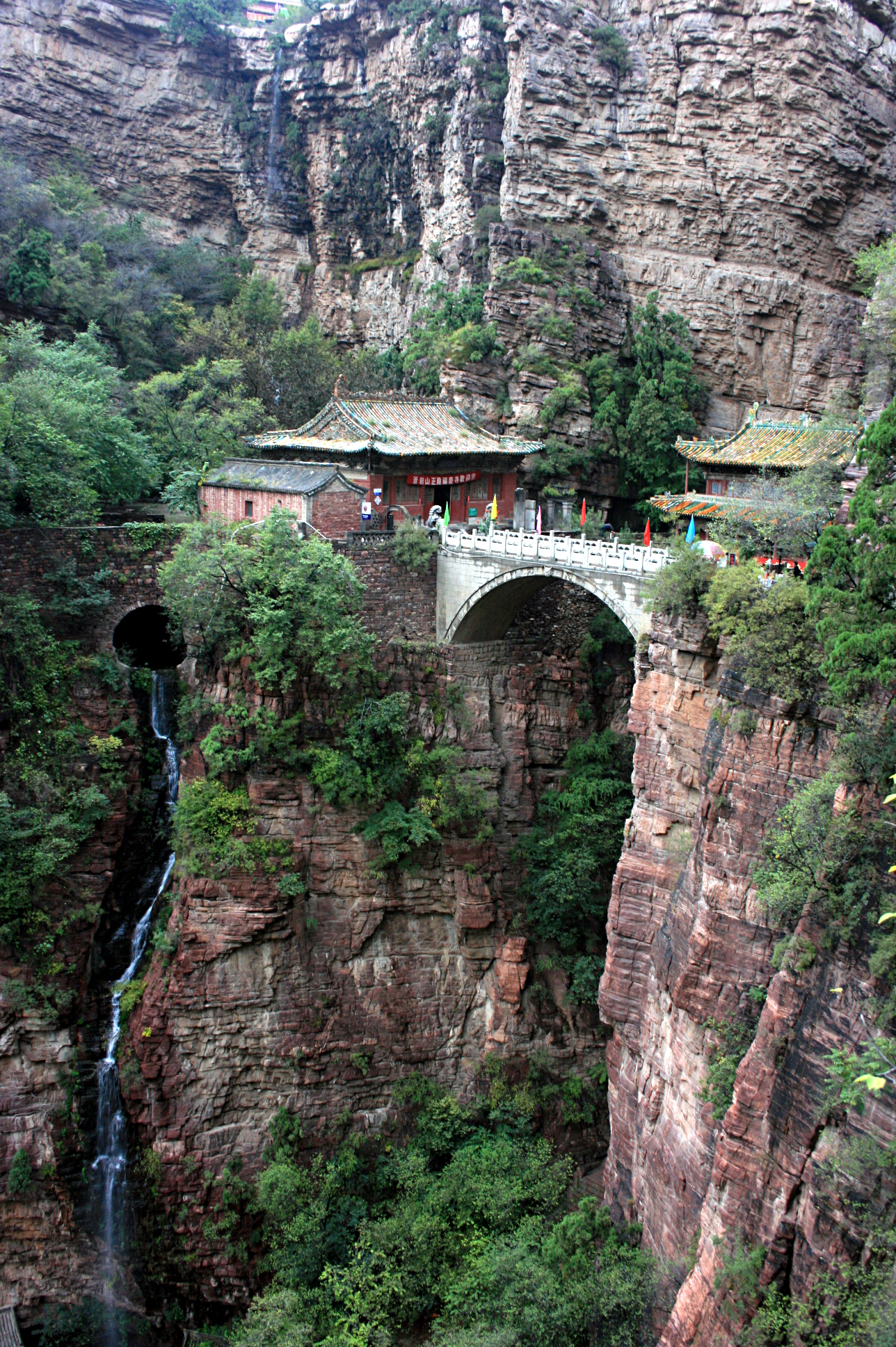
Mount Cangyan, including the bridge pictured above, was one of many filming locations.

Although its Academy Award for Best Foreign Language Film was presented to Taiwan, Crouching Tiger, Hidden Dragon was in fact an international co-production between companies in four regions: the Chinese company China Film Co-production Corporation, the American companies Columbia Pictures Film Production Asia, Sony Pictures Classics, and Good Machine, the Hong Kong company Edko Films, and the Taiwanese Zoom Hunt Productions, as well as the unspecified United China Vision and Asia Union Film & Entertainment, created solely for this film.

The film was made in Beijing, with location shooting in Urumchi, Western Provinces, Taklamakan Plateau, Shanghai and Anji of China. The first phase of shooting was in the Gobi Desert where it consistently rained. Director Ang Lee noted: "I didn't take one break in eight months, not even for half a day. I was miserable—I just didn't have the extra energy to be happy. Near the end, I could hardly breathe. I thought I was about to have a stroke." The stunt work was mostly performed by the actors themselves and Ang Lee stated in an interview that computers were used "only to remove the safety wires that held the actors" aloft. "Most of the time you can see their faces," he added. "That's really them in the trees."

Director Ang Lee had long dreamed of making a martial arts film with a strong humanistic touch. To him, martial arts were not just about fighting; each move was an extension of a character's personality, and a duel could reflect the evolving dynamics between characters. Lee was deeply fascinated by the chivalrous world of ancient China—a world filled with Confucian ideals, honor, and romance, which once carried emotional and cultural meaning for Chinese people. He felt that Hong Kong and Taiwanese martial arts films often lacked genuine emotional depth, remaining at the level of visual spectacle. Crouching Tiger, Hidden Dragon began filming on 31 July 1999 in Xinjiang and later moved to Jiangnan and Beijing. It was Ang Lee's first time shooting a film in mainland China. For eight months, he worked over 15 hours a day, rarely going home. To balance cost and artistic vision, he oversaw nearly every detail himself.

Another compounding issue was the difference between accents of the four lead actors: Chow Yun-fat is from Hong Kong and speaks Cantonese natively; Michelle Yeoh is from Malaysia and grew up speaking English and Malay, so she learned the Standard Chinese lines phonetically; Chang Chen is from Taiwan and he speaks Standard Chinese in a Taiwanese accent. Only Zhang Ziyi spoke with a native Mandarin accent that Ang Lee wanted. Chow Yun Fat said, on "the first day [of shooting], I had to do 28 takes just because of the language. That's never happened before in my life."

The film specifically targeted Western audiences rather than the domestic audiences who were already used to Wuxia films. As a result, high-quality English subtitles were needed. Ang Lee, who was educated in the West, personally edited the subtitles to ensure they were satisfactory for Western audiences.

=== Soundtrack ===
The score was composed by Tan Dun in 1999. It was played for the movie by the Shanghai Symphony Orchestra, the Shanghai National Orchestra and the Shanghai Percussion Ensemble. It features solo passages for cello played by Yo-Yo Ma. The "last track" ("A Love Before Time") features Coco Lee, who later sang it at the Academy Awards. The composer Chen Yuanlin also collaborated in the project. The music for the entire film was produced in two weeks. Tan the next year (2000) adapted his filmscore as a cello concerto called simply "Crouching Tiger".

== Release ==
=== Marketing ===
The film was adapted into a video game and a series of comics, and it led to the original novel being adapted into a 34-episode Taiwanese television series. The latter was released in 2004 as New Crouching Tiger, Hidden Dragon for North American release.

In 2000, the distributor Sony Pictures Classics signed with Fox Entertainment Group for free television rights of the movie, and after that, a deal with Starz Encore Group, for pay television rights of the movie.

=== Home media ===
The film was released on VHS and DVD on 5 June 2001 by Columbia TriStar Home Entertainment. In October of that same year, it became one of the first Superbit DVDs to be ever released, with Air Force One, The Fifth Element, Desperado and Johnny Mnemonic being the others. It was also released on UMD on 26 June 2005. In the United Kingdom, it was watched by 3.5 million viewers on television in 2004, making it the year's most-watched foreign-language film on television.

=== Restoration ===
The film was re-released in a 4K restoration by Sony Pictures Classics in 2023.

== Reception ==
=== Box office ===
The film premiered in cinemas on 8 December 2000, in limited release within the United States. During its opening weekend, the film opened in 15th place, grossing $663,205 in business, showing at 16 locations. On 12 January 2001, Crouching Tiger, Hidden Dragon premiered in cinemas in wide release throughout the U.S., grossing $8,647,295 in business, ranking in sixth place. The film Save the Last Dance came in first place during that weekend, grossing $23,444,930. The film's revenue dropped by almost 30% in its second week of release, earning $6,080,357. For that particular weekend, the film fell to eighth place, screening in 837 theaters. Save the Last Dance remained unchanged in first place, grossing $15,366,047 in box-office revenue. During its final week in release, Crouching Tiger, Hidden Dragon opened in a distant 50th place with $37,233 in revenue. The film went on to top out domestically at $128,078,872 in total ticket sales through a 31-week theatrical run. Internationally, the film took in an additional $85,446,864 in box-office business for a combined worldwide total of $213,525,736. In the North American market, it became the highest grossing foreign language film in North America and was the first foreign- language film to break the US $100 million mark in box office receipts. It also broke the box office records in England, France, Germany, Australia and New Zealand for foreign language films. For 2000 as a whole, the film cumulatively ranked at a worldwide box-office performance position of 19.

=== Critical response ===
Crouching Tiger, Hidden Dragon, which is based on an early 20th century novel by Wang Dulu, unfolds much like a comic book, with the characters and their circumstances being painted using wide brush strokes. Subtlety is not part of Lee's palette; he is going for something grand and melodramatic, and that's what he gets.

— James Berardinelli, ReelViews

Crouching Tiger, Hidden Dragon was widely acclaimed in the Western world, receiving numerous awards. On the review aggregator website Rotten Tomatoes, the film holds an approval rating of 96% based on 216 reviews. The site's critical consensus states: "The movie that catapulted Ang Lee into the ranks of upper echelon Hollywood filmmakers, Crouching Tiger, Hidden Dragon features a deft mix of amazing martial arts battles, beautiful scenery, and tasteful drama." Metacritic reported the film had an average score of 94 out of 100, based on 32 reviews, indicating "universal acclaim". The film’s commercial and critical success made it an important breakthrough for Chinese-language cinema in the American market, where it became the first Chinese-language film to attract a mass audience.

Some Chinese-speaking viewers were bothered by the accents of the leading actors. Neither Chow (a native Cantonese speaker) nor Yeoh (who was born and raised in Malaysia) spoke Mandarin Chinese as a mother tongue. All four main actors spoke Standard Chinese with vastly different accents: Chow speaks with a Cantonese accent, Yeoh with a Malaysian accent, Chang Chen with a Taiwanese accent, and Zhang Ziyi with a Beijing accent. Yeoh responded to this complaint in a 28 December 2000 interview, stating: "My character lived outside of Beijing, and so I didn't have to do the Beijing accent." When the interviewer, Craig Reid, remarked: "My mother-in-law has this strange Sichuan–Mandarin accent that's hard for me to understand," Yeoh responded: "Yes, provinces all have their very own strong accents. When we first started the movie, Cheng Pei Pei was going to have her accent, and Chang Zhen was going to have his accent, and this person would have that accent. And in the end nobody could understand what they were saying. Forget about us, even the crew from Beijing thought this was all weird."

The film led to a boost in popularity of Chinese wuxia films in the western world, where they were previously little known, and led to films such as Hero and House of Flying Daggers, both directed by Zhang Yimou, being marketed towards Western audiences. The film also provided the breakthrough role for Zhang Ziyi's career, who noted:

Because of movies like Crouching Tiger, Hidden Dragon, Hero, and Memoirs of a Geisha, a lot of people in the United States have become interested not only in me but in Chinese and Asian actors in general. Because of these movies, maybe there will be more opportunities for Asian actors.

Film Journal noted that Crouching Tiger, Hidden Dragon "pulled off the rare trifecta of critical acclaim, boffo box-office and gestalt shift", in reference to its ground-breaking success for a subtitled film in the American market.

Its success spawned a series of imitations to the basic formula in Greater China, with similar titles and variations in period and location. Producers of these imitators denied claims that their movies were emulations of Crouching Tiger; Columbia's manager for Asia compared the copycats to a volcano disaster movie spawning imitations to cash in.

=== Accolades ===
Garnering widespread critical acclaim at the Toronto and New York film festivals, the film also became a favorite when Academy Awards nominations were announced in 2001. The film was screened out of competition at the 2000 Cannes Film Festival. The film received ten Academy Award nominations, which was the highest ever for a non–English-language film, up until it was tied by Roma (2018) and then broken by Emilia Pérez (2024), which received 13 nominations.

The film is ranked at number 497 on Empire's 2008 list of the 500 greatest movies of all time. and at number 66 in the magazine's 100 Best Films of World Cinema, published in 2010. In 2010, the Independent Film & Television Alliance selected the film as one of the 30 Most Significant Independent Films of the last 30 years.In 2013, The Guardian ranked it as the second-best martial arts film of all time and the fourth-best action film of all time. In 2016, it was voted the 35th-best film of the 21st century as picked by 177 film critics from around the world in a poll conducted by BBC. The film was included in BBC's 2018 list of The 100 greatest foreign language films ranked by 209 critics from 43 countries around the world. In 2019, The Guardian ranked the film 51st in its 100 best films of the 21st century list. The February 2020 issue of New York Magazine lists Crouching Tiger, Hidden Dragon as among "The Best Movies That Lost Best Picture at the Oscars". In 2024, Looper ranked it number 12 on its list of the "50 Best PG-13 Movies of All Time", writing "It's rare for a movie to conjure up the word "sweeping," but that's just what Crouching Tiger, Hidden Dragon does. Whether it's the sight of human beings flying through the sky or the absorbing human drama that drives the plot, Ang Lee's 2000 wuxia feature is a remarkable movie that makes one's jaw drop as often as it makes your heart soar." In June 2025, the film ranked number 16 on The New York Times' list of "The 100 Best Movies of the 21st Century" and number 81 on the "Readers' Choice" edition of the list. In July 2025, it ranked number 79 on Rolling Stone's list of "The 100 Best Movies of the 21st Century".

Event	Category	Nominee	Result	Ref.
Ammy Awards	Best Hollywood Picture	Ang Lee	Won	
Ammy Awards	Best Male Actor in a Cinematic Production	Chow Yun Fat	Won	
Ammy Awards	Best Female Actor in a Cinematic Production	Michelle Yeoh	Won	
Ammy Awards	Best Female Actor in a Cinematic Production	Zhang Ziyi	Nominated	
73rd Academy Awards	Best Picture	Bill Kong, Hsu Li-kong, and Ang Lee	Nominated	
73rd Academy Awards	Best Director	Ang Lee	Nominated	
73rd Academy Awards	Best Adapted Screenplay	Wang Hui-ling, James Schamus, and Tsai Kuo-jung	Nominated	
73rd Academy Awards	Best Foreign Language Film	Taiwan	Won	
73rd Academy Awards	Best Art Direction	Art Direction and Set Decoration: Tim Yip	Won	
73rd Academy Awards	Best Cinematography	Peter Pau	Won	
73rd Academy Awards	Best Costume Design	Tim Yip	Nominated	
73rd Academy Awards	Best Film Editing	Tim Squyres	Nominated	
73rd Academy Awards	Best Original Score	Tan Dun	Won	
73rd Academy Awards	Best Original Song	Jorge Calandrelli, Tan Dun and James Schamus for "A Love Before Time"	Nominated	
2000 American Society of Cinematographers Awards	Best Cinematography	Peter Pau	Nominated	
54th British Academy Film Awards	Best Film		Nominated	
54th British Academy Film Awards	Best Film Not in the English Language		Won	
54th British Academy Film Awards	Best Actress in a Leading Role	Michelle Yeoh	Nominated	
54th British Academy Film Awards	Best Actress in a Supporting Role	Zhang Ziyi	Nominated	
54th British Academy Film Awards	Best Cinematography	Peter Pau	Nominated	
54th British Academy Film Awards	Best Makeup and Hair		Nominated	
54th British Academy Film Awards	Best Editing	Tim Squyres	Nominated	
54th British Academy Film Awards	Best Costume Design	Tim Yip	Won	
54th British Academy Film Awards	Best Director	Ang Lee	Won	
54th British Academy Film Awards	Best Music	Tan Dun	Won	
54th British Academy Film Awards	Best Adapted Screenplay	Wang Hui-ling, James Schamus, and Tsai Kuo-jung	Nominated	
54th British Academy Film Awards	Best Production Design	Tim Yip	Nominated	
54th British Academy Film Awards	Best Sound		Nominated	
54th British Academy Film Awards	Best Visual Effects		Nominated	
Broadcast Film Critics Association Awards 2000	Best Foreign Film		Won	
Chicago Film Critics Association Awards 2000	Most Promising Actress	Zhang Ziyi	Won	
Chicago Film Critics Association Awards 2000	Best Original Score	Tan Dun	Won	
Chicago Film Critics Association Awards 2000	Best Cinematography	Peter Pau	Won	
Chicago Film Critics Association Awards 2000	Best Foreign Film		Won	
2000 Directors Guild of America Awards	Best Director	Ang Lee	Won	
2000 Film Fest Gent festival	Georges Delerue Award	Tan Dun	Won	
58th Golden Globe Awards	Best Foreign Language Film		Won	
58th Golden Globe Awards	Best Director	Ang Lee	Won	
58th Golden Globe Awards	Best Original Score	Tan Dun	Nominated	
20th Hong Kong Film Awards	Best Film		Won	
20th Hong Kong Film Awards	Best Director	Ang Lee	Won	
20th Hong Kong Film Awards	Best Screenplay	Wang Hui-ling, James Schamus, and Tsai Kuo-jung	Nominated	
20th Hong Kong Film Awards	Best Actor	Chow Yun-fat	Nominated	
20th Hong Kong Film Awards	Best Actress	Zhang Ziyi	Nominated	
20th Hong Kong Film Awards	Best Actress	Michelle Yeoh	Nominated	
20th Hong Kong Film Awards	Best Supporting Actor	Chang Chen	Nominated	
20th Hong Kong Film Awards	Best Supporting Actress	Cheng Pei-pei	Won	
20th Hong Kong Film Awards	Best Cinematography	Peter Pau	Won	
20th Hong Kong Film Awards	Best Film Editing	Tim Squyres	Nominated	
20th Hong Kong Film Awards	Best Art Direction	Tim Yip	Nominated	
20th Hong Kong Film Awards	Best Costume Make Up Design	Tim Yip	Nominated	
20th Hong Kong Film Awards	Best Action Choreography	Yuen Wo-ping	Won	
20th Hong Kong Film Awards	Best Original Film Score	Tan Dun	Won	
20th Hong Kong Film Awards	Best Original Film Song	Tan Dun, Jorge Calandrelli, Yee Kar-yeung, Coco Lee	Won	
20th Hong Kong Film Awards	Best Sound Design	Eugene Gearty	Won	
Hugo Award (2001)	Best Dramatic Presentation		Won	
Independent Spirit Awards 2000	Best Picture		Won	
Independent Spirit Awards 2000	Best Director	Ang Lee	Won	
Independent Spirit Awards 2000	Best Supporting Actress	Zhang Ziyi	Won	
Los Angeles Film Critics Association Awards 2000	Best Picture		Won	
Los Angeles Film Critics Association Awards 2000	Best Cinematography	Peter Pau	Won	
Los Angeles Film Critics Association Awards 2000	Best Music Score	Tan Dun	Won	
Los Angeles Film Critics Association Awards 2000	Best Production Design	Tim Yip	Won	
National Board of Review Awards 2000	Best Foreign Language Film		Won	
National Board of Review Awards 2000	Top Foreign Films		Shortlisted	
2000 New York Film Critics Circle Awards	Best Cinematography	Peter Pau	Won	
Toronto Film Critics Association Awards 2000	Best Picture		Won	
Toronto Film Critics Association Awards 2000	Best Director	Ang Lee	Won	
Toronto Film Critics Association Awards 2000	Best Actress	Michelle Yeoh	Won	
Toronto Film Critics Association Awards 2000	Best Supporting Actress	Zhang Ziyi	Won	
2000 Toronto International Film Festival	People's Choice Award	Ang Lee	Won	
Writers Guild of America Awards 2000	Best Adapted Screenplay	Wang Hui-ling, James Schamus, and Tsai Kuo-jung	Nominated	
37th Golden Horse Awards – 2000	Best Feature Film		Won	
37th Golden Horse Awards – 2000	Best Director	Ang Lee	Nominated	
37th Golden Horse Awards – 2000	Best Leading Actress	Michelle Yeoh	Nominated	
37th Golden Horse Awards – 2000	Best Leading Actress	Zhang Ziyi	Nominated	
37th Golden Horse Awards – 2000	Best Screenplay Adaption	Wang Hui-ling, James Schamus, and Tsai Kuo-jung	Nominated	
37th Golden Horse Awards – 2000	Best Cinematography	Peter Pau	Nominated	
37th Golden Horse Awards – 2000	Best Film Editing	Tim Squyres	Won	
37th Golden Horse Awards – 2000	Best Art Direction	Tim Yip	Nominated	
37th Golden Horse Awards – 2000	Best Original Score	Tan Dun	Won	
37th Golden Horse Awards – 2000	Best Sound Design	Eugene Gearty	Won	
37th Golden Horse Awards – 2000	Best Action Choreography	Yuen Wo-ping	Won	
37th Golden Horse Awards – 2000	Best Visual Effects	Leo Lo, and Rob Hodgson	Won	
54th Bodil Awards	Best Non-American Film		Won	
Online Film Critics Society Awards 2000	Best Picture		Nominated	
Online Film Critics Society Awards 2000	Best Foreign Language Film		Won	
Online Film Critics Society Awards 2000	Best Director	Ang Lee	Nominated	
Online Film Critics Society Awards 2000	Best Supporting Actress	Zhang Ziyi	Nominated	
Online Film Critics Society Awards 2000	Best Cinematography	Peter Pau	Won	
Online Film Critics Society Awards 2000	Best Editing	Tim Squyres	Nominated	
Online Film Critics Society Awards 2000	Best Original Score	Tan Dun	Nominated	
27th Saturn Awards	Best Action/Adventure/Thriller Film		Won	
27th Saturn Awards	Best Director	Ang Lee	Nominated	
27th Saturn Awards	Best Actor	Chow Yu-Fat	Nominated	
27th Saturn Awards	Best Actress	Michelle Yeoh	Nominated	
27th Saturn Awards	Best Supporting Actress	Zhang Ziyi	Nominated	
27th Saturn Awards	Best Writing	Wang Hui-ling, James Schamus, and Kuo Jung Tsai	Nominated	
27th Saturn Awards	Best Costumes	Timmy Yip	Nominated	
27th Saturn Awards	Best Music	Tan Dun and Yo-Yo Ma	Nominated	

== Sequel ==
In 2001, it was reported that director Ang Lee was planning to make a sequel to the film. Subtitled Sword of Destiny, the film was released in 2016. It was directed by Yuen Wo-ping, who was the action choreographer for the first film. It is a co-production between Pegasus Media, China Film Group Corporation, and the Weinstein Company. Unlike the original film, the sequel was filmed in English for international release and dubbed into Chinese for Chinese releases.

Sword of Destiny is based on Iron Knight, Silver Vase, the next (and last) novel in the Crane-Iron Series. It features a mostly new cast, headed by Donnie Yen. Michelle Yeoh reprised her role from the original. Zhang Ziyi was also approached to appear in Sword of Destiny but refused, stating that she would only appear in a sequel if Ang Lee were directing it.

In the West, the sequel was for the most part not shown in theaters, instead being distributed direct-to-video by the streaming service Netflix.

== In popular culture ==
The names of the pterosaur genus Kryptodrakon and the ceratopsian genus Yinlong (both meaning "hidden dragon" in Greek and Chinese respectively) allude to the film.

The character of Lo, or "Dark Cloud" the desert bandit, influenced the development of the protagonist of the Prince of Persia series of video games.
