= Badiucao =

Chinese-Australian political cartoonist

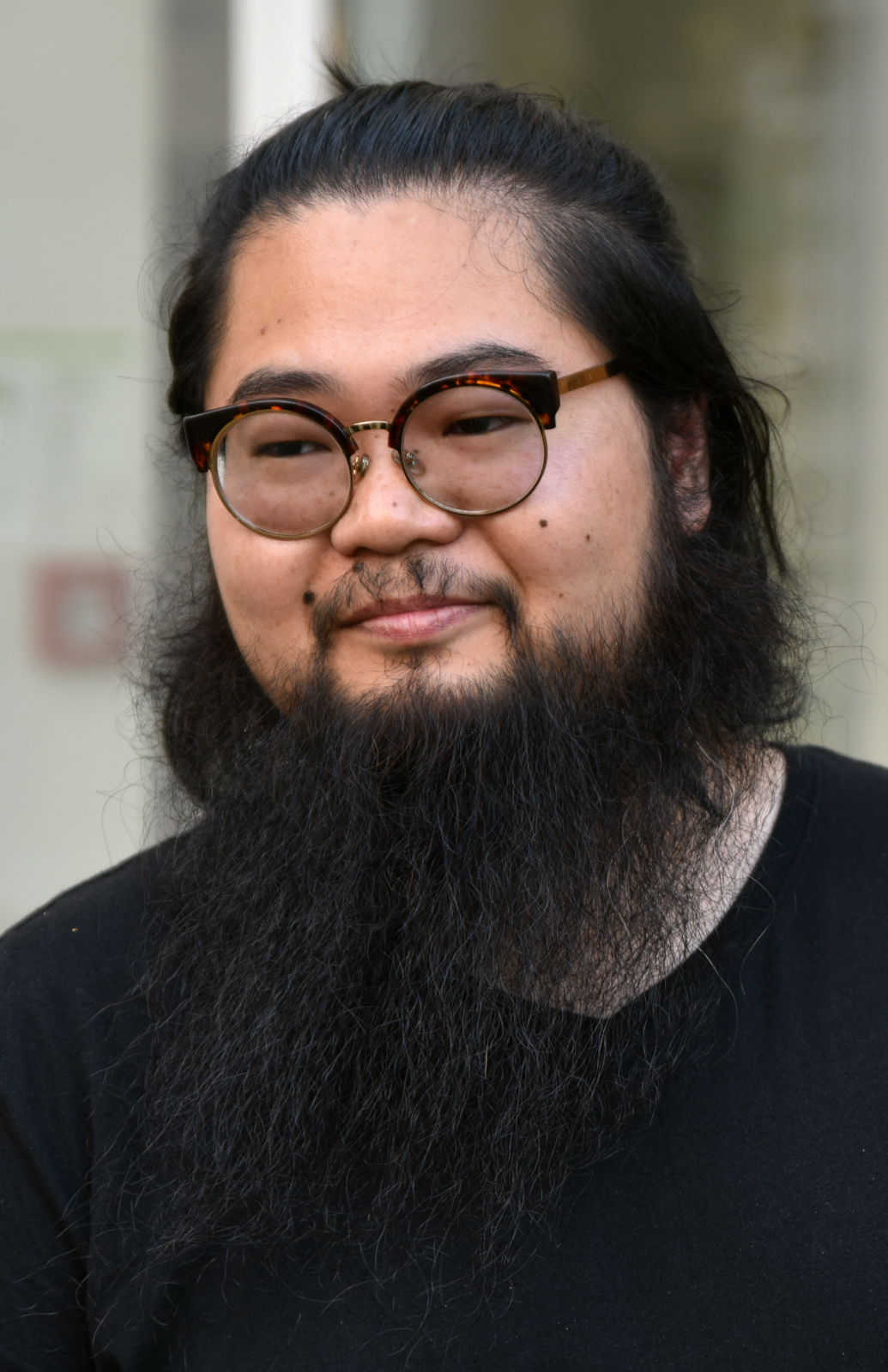
- Badiucao (2022)
- Born: 1986 (age 39–40) Shanghai, China
- Pseudonym: Badiucao
- Notable works: "Watching Big Brother: Political Cartoons by Badiucao."; "Covering China from Cyberspace 2014"

Badiucao (simplified Chinese: 巴丢草; traditional Chinese: 巴丟草; pinyin: Bādiūcǎo) is a Chinese-born Australian political cartoonist, artist and rights activist based in Australia. He is regarded as one of China's most prolific and well-known political cartoonists. He adopted his pen-name to protect his identity.

== Biography ==
=== Early life ===
Badiucao was born in 1986 and raised in urban Shanghai. His paternal grandfather was a pioneer filmmaker, who was persecuted after the communists came to power, sent to laogai farms in Qinghai during the Anti-Rightist Campaign, and starved to death. A few years later, his father became an orphan when his grandmother died in poverty on Chinese New Year's Eve. His father grew up with the help of neighbours and strived for university education, but was denied admission because of family ties.

=== Education ===
Badiucao had no formal training in art while in China. He studied law at the East China University of Political Science and Law. He and his dorm-mates accidentally watched the documentary The Gate of Heavenly Peace after it was hidden in a pirated Taiwanese drama. Disillusioned with China, he moved to Australia to study in 2009, becoming a citizen later. He worked as a kindergarten teacher for many years.

=== Career ===
Badiucao first political cartoon as published in 2011 and had the Wenzhou train collision as subject.

His works had been published in BBC, CNN, China Digital Times and Hong Kong Free Press; and also had been used by Amnesty International and Freedom House.

Badiucao's works have also featured exhibitions in the US, Australia, Italy, Czech Republic and Poland.

According to a 2013 interview, Badiucao admired three other Chinese political cartoonists at the time—Hexie Farm, Rebel Pepper and Kuang Biao.

=== End of anonymity ===
Until June 2019, Badiucao wore a mask at public events to maintain as much anonymity as possible.

According to Badiucao, the Chinese regime may have identified him after a fellow dissident posted on X that he worked as an assistant to Chinese artist and dissident Ai Weiwei, which linked him to him.

In June 2019, Badiucao made his face public in a documentary titled "China’s Artful Dissident," as well as personal details about his life (such as his age, professional degree, and university he graduated from) because after Chinese authorities had identified him, his relatives were threatened and he no longer had a reason to remain anonymous. As Badiucao reported to Agence France-Presse, the harassment of his relatives could now be publicly exposed after his anonymity ended.

== Style and approach ==
Badiucao uses satire and pop culture references to convey his message. He often manipulates archetypal images from Communist Party propaganda to make subversive political statements.

He asserts that the government authorities in China are very concerned that their suppression of human rights activism is attracting attention from international media.

In an early 2016 interview, he stated that "Cartoons and portraits can create a unified visual symbol, which can help spread the message and attract sustained attention, in order to create pressure from public opinion. Maybe this pressure can improve the situation for those who are imprisoned, as well as comfort the family members of the persecuted."

== Activism ==
Badiucao is extremely active and often responds quickly to prevailing news and events in relation to mainland China, Taiwan and the Chinese diaspora. He also responds quickly to news and events relating to other authoritarian countries such as Iran.

In response to the PLA-aligned Kathy Chen being appointed the head of Twitter in China, Badiucao drew Twitter's logo, a bird, impaled on the yellow star that is a feature of China's flag.

Badiucao has supported other artists and dissidents. In 2013, in response to the rape of six students by the school's principal and a local official, Ai Xiaoming from Sun Yat-sen University posted a topless picture of herself on Twitter, holding scissors, covered in writing above her breasts, "Get a room with me, let Ye Haiyan go", conveying a strong political message. In response, Badiucao posted a cartoon in which she became a big pair of scissors, with gun barrels protruding from her nipples.

In early 2016, he created a series of artworks supporting Wu Wei, a former head tutor at the University of Sydney, who had resigned after an incident in which he referred to certain students from mainland China as 'pigs'. Wu Wei had used the character tun (豚), instead of the more commonly used character, zhu (猪). Online dissidents have co-opted tun as a slang reference to guan'erdai, the second-generation offspring of Chinese Communist Party officials.

In May 2016, the newly elected President of Taiwan, Tsai Ing-wen, was subject to an attack upon her marital status by Wang Weixing, a scholar with the Chinese People's Liberation Army. Badiucao highlighted the irony of the attack with a cartoon comparing Tsai's marital status to that of Xi Jinping, current General Secretary of the Chinese Communist Party.

After Xi Jinping toured state media, Badiucao depicted General Secretary Xi being greeted by a cast of monkeys and snakes. This alludes to the media's role as a 'mouthpiece of the Party'. The Mandarin term for mouthpiece (喉舌) equates to 'throat and tongue' and is a homophone for monkey snake (猴蛇).

In 2018, an art show about Badiucao was planned to be held in Hong Kong. However, the show has been cancelled due to "safety concerns" later due to threats made by the Chinese authorities regarding the artist. In 2019, a planned artist talk about activism with Hong Kong musician-activist Denise Ho at the National Gallery of Victoria in Melbourne was rejected by the gallery for "security reasons." On the anniversary of the Tiananmen Square massacre, in June 2019, a documentary about Badiucao was shown on Australian television.

Badiucao created a "protest NFT collection" criticising China's human rights record and calling for a boycott of the 2022 Winter Olympics, created through the Art in Protest residency, a partnership between the Gray Area Foundation for the Arts and the Human Rights Foundation. In a statement, Badiucao said the series depicts "the Chinese government's oppression of the Tibetan people, the Uyghur genocide, the dismantling of democracy in Hong Kong, the regime's omnipresent surveillance systems, and lack of transparency surrounding the Covid-19 pandemic." The series shows athletes in Chinese uniforms tackling a Tibetan monk, skating over Hong Kong's flag, atop a surveillance camera, sliding a virus, and aiming a rifle at a blindfolded Uyghur. Five pieces were displayed in Miami, Florida during Art Basel Miami Beach in 2021.

Copies of the posters put up anonymously at George Washington University in February 2022 were reported to police and removed, with Chinese student organisations claiming they "incited racial hatred and ethnic tensions." Shortly afterwards, GWU President Mark Wrighton issued a statement, saying "Upon full understanding, I do not view these posters as racist; they are political statements. There is no university investigation underway, and the university will not take any action against the students who displayed the poster." Regarding the art, Badiucao told Axios, "My art is always targeting the Chinese Communist Party, never the Chinese suffering from this regime."

== Political persecution and harassment ==
=== Online harassment ===
In 2016, Badiucao revealed that he had been the target of "large-scale" and systematised online attacks on two occasions, (as far as 2016) apparently with the intention of contaminating search results if his person or work, as well as to intimidate him.

=== Threats to family and Hong Kong cancelation ===
By November 2018, Badiucao was preparing his first solo exposition in Hong Kong under the title "Black comedy for Hong Kong, China and the world", but he had to cancel it after relatives informed him that they had been threatened by Chinese authorities.

=== Following in public spaces ===
Following the release of the documentary "China's Artful Dissident" in June 2019, Badiucao reported an incident in which four Asian men boarded a bus that he usually takes home and sat in separate seats around him. The incident caught his attention since there were almost no Asians in the suburb where he lived. Noticing that some of the men were wearing wireless earpieces, he decided to get off the bus early and the group of men followed him even when Badiucao retraced his steps. He then entered a supermarket where the group waited for him outside and then left after about 45 minutes.

=== Cancellation attempts in Europe ===
==== Italy ====
From November 2021 to February 2022, Badiucao presented the exhibition "China (non) é vicina" ("China is (not) near"), in Brescia.

The Chinese embassy in Rome said the artworks were "full of anti-Chinese lies" and warned in a message to the Brescia city government that holding the exhibition would "jeopardize the friendly relations between China and Italy."

However, the Mayor of Brescia reiterated her refusal to cancel the event, stating that "None of us [...] had the slightest doubt about this exhibition going ahead," while museum officials made clear that there was "no intention of offending the Chinese people or Chinese culture and civilization" but "support freedom of expression."

==== Czech Republic ====
In 2022 Badiucao presented an exhibition entitled "MADe IN CHINA" at the DOX Centre for Contemporary Art in Prague.

The exhibition dealt with topics such as abuses by the Chinese government against the Uyghur ethnic group, cases of Chinese censorship during the COVID-19 pandemic, repression in Hong Kong in 2019 and the favouritism of the Chinese regime to Russia during the war in Ukraine.

The day before the opening, the DOX Centre received a message from the Chinese Embassy in the Czech Republic, requesting to cancel the exhibition, as it could damage relations between the two countries. Previously, the Chinese embassy had attempted to cancel the exhibition directly with the Czech government.

==== Poland ====
In June 2023, Badiucao presented the exhibition "Tell China's Story Well" at the Ujazdów Castle art centre in Warsaw.

The exhibition consisted of 70 works, and dealt with themes such as the 2019 Hong Kong protests and the Tiananmen massacre.

The Polish Ministry of Culture received letters requesting the cancellation of the exhibition. The Ujazdowski Castle art centre subsequently announced that a "high-ranking representative" of the Chinese embassy had come to its offices to request the cancellation. Later the Ujazdowski Castle art centre's website was blocked in China.

=== Identity theft ===
On 13 June 2024, the community of Chinese dissidents in Melbourne, Australia, held an event that Badiucao was supposed to attend and whose attendees included the journalist and reporter Cheng Lei, who had been released after spending three years in prison on false charges in October 2023.

An unidentified man with a similar physical build to Badiucao showed up at the event pretending to be him, which he achieved by wearing a mask almost all night, since when Badiucao maintained his anonymity, he used to show up at events wearing a mask.

The impostor then managed to engage in conversations with other Chinese dissidents, especially Cheng Lei.

Although the impostor could not be identified or corroborated as a Chinese agent, the fact that he knew that Badiucao was unable to attend the event, lead to speculations that he probably had been following Badiucao.

== Criticism against other Chinese Dissidents ==
Badiucao criticized Wang Dan and other Chinese dissidents for supporting Trump, saying, "These guys believe the end justifies the means. They believe that if Trump launches a war against the CCP, then he is the right choice for them." He added, "This mentality aligns with the 'America First' ideology. In this situation, as long as your goal is achieved, it doesn't matter if others suffer, and their goal is to overthrow the CCP."

== Awards and recognition ==
- 2023 Walkley award for best illustration.
- 2020 Václav Havel Prize for Creative Dissent.
- 2019 "Robert Russell Courage in Editorial Cartooning Award" from the Cartoonists Rights Network International.
- 2014 Top-thirty finalist in the "Images of Repression and Freedom" from the Freedom House.

== Exhibitions ==
=== 2023 ===
- «Tell China’s Story Well». Ujazdów Castle art centre in Warsaw, Poland.

=== 2022 ===
- «MADe IN CHINA». DOX Centre for Contemporary Art in Prague, Czech Republic.

=== 2021 ===
- «China (non) é vicina». Museum of Santa Giulia, in Brescia, Italy.

=== 2017 ===
- «Home Thoughts from Abroad». Praxis Art Space in Adelaide, Australia.

=== 2016 ===
- «Divine Interventions». Nexus Art in Adelaide, Australia.
- «SALA in the Square». SALA in Adelaide, Australia.

=== 2015 ===
- «Parriastes: The Cutting Edge of Truth». Aluna Art Foundation in Miami, United States.
- «Je ris donc je suis pas terrorist (Je me fais Hara-Kiri) pour Charlie Hebdo». Trieste, Italy.

== Bibliography ==
- Beach, Sophie (4 December 2013). "Ten Questions for Cartoonist Badiucao (巴丢草)". China Digital Times. Berkeley, California.
- Chow, Vivienne (13 May 2022). "China Tried to Shut Down Dissident Artist Badiucao's Show in Prague. It Only Made Him More Famous". Artnet. New York City, United States.
- Editorial team (11 June 2023). "La Cina tenta di nuovo di far cancellare una mostra di Badiucao, in Polonia. Senza riuscirci" [China Tries Again to Cancel Badiucao Exhibition in Poland. Fails]. Finestre sull'Arte (in Italian). Italy: Danae Project Ltd. ISSN 2612-6931.
- Griffiths, James (5 June 2019). "'I'm not backing down this time': Chinese dissident artist Badiucao reveals his identity". CNN.
- McCabe, Caitlin (11 February 2016). "Watching Big Brother: Chinese Cartoonist Watches Back". Cbldf.org. Comic Book Legal Defense Fund.
- O'Neil, Patrick (23 November 2024). "Watched, followed, threatened. Now an impostor is claiming to be me". The Age. Melbourne, Australia. ISSN 0312-6307.
- Philipson, Alice (3 June 2019). "Chinese cartoonist Badiucao unmasks after Beijing threats". Yahoo! News. Agence France-Presse. Archived from the original on 8 June 2019.
- RS/AW (13 November 2021). "Italian city opens art show despite Beijing pressure". Bonn, Germany: Deutsche Welle.
