= The Raid (1991 film) =

1991 Hong Kong film by Tsui Hark and Ching Siu-tung

- Theatrical poster

Chinese name
- Traditional Chinese: 財叔之橫掃千軍
- Simplified Chinese: 财叔之横扫千军
Transcriptions
Standard Mandarin
- Hanyu Pinyin: Cái Shū Zhī Héng Sǎo Qiān Jūn
Yue: Cantonese
- Jyutping: Coi4 Suk1 Zi1 Waang4 Sou3 Cin1 Gwan1
- Directed by: Tsui Hark; Ching Siu-tung
- Screenplay by: Tsui Hark; Yuen Kai-chi
- Based on: Uncle Choi by Michael Hui
- Produced by: Tsui Hark
- Starring: Dean Shek; Jacky Cheung; Tony Leung; Joyce Godenzi; Fennie Yuen
- Cinematography: Tom Lau; Arthur Wong
- Edited by: Marco Mak
- Music by: James Wong; Romeo Diaz
- Production companies: Cinema City Entertainment; Mei Ah Film Production
- Distributed by: Golden Princess Amusement
- Release date: 28 March 1991
- Running time: 100 minutes
- Country: Hong Kong
- Language: Cantonese
- Box office: HK$3.694 million

The Raid (Cantonese: 財叔之橫掃千軍 Coi Suk Zi Waang Sou Cin Gwan = "Uncle's Sweeping Thousands") is a 1991 Hong Kong action film directed by Tsui Hark and Ching Siu-tung and based on the Hong Kong manhua, Uncle Choi, published by Michael Hui from 1958 to the mid-1970s. The film stars Dean Shek, who also served as the film's presenter, as the titular protagonist, while also co-starring Jacky Cheung, Tony Leung, Joyce Godenzi, Fennie Yuen, Paul Chu and Corey Yuen. The Raid is also Shek's final acting role before retiring from the film industry.

== Plot ==
During the early years of the Republic of China, Qing emperor Puyi was controlled by the Japanese and he established the Manchurian government in the north with Japanese Commander Mesa and Yoshiko Kawashima.

Uncle Choi was once a soldier. Having studied medicine, he was entrusted one day by indigenous jungle people to save someone. On the thrilling road, he finds a group of soldiers who are victims of poison gas. Uncle Choi tries hard to save the colonel, but he dies. In the colonel's dying breath, he gives the task of resisting the enemy to Lieutenant Mang Tai-hoi. Uncle Choi had wanted to serve the country wholeheartedly, but was refused.

Later, Uncle Choi sneaks into the palace, posing as the cook, and meets Mang. Their mission is to find the "Cheung-kong #1" Tina. There, they raid the poison gas base map, but their actions were discovered by Mesa and Kawashima, so Uncle Choi, Tina and other people flee, and on the way Uncle Choi rescues his adopted daughter Nancy.

Uncle Choi and the gang prepare a large-scale attack on the poison gas base, after numerous fierce battles, they conquer in the end.

== Cast ==
- Dean Shek as Uncle Choi
- Jacky Cheung as Bobo Bear
- Tony Leung Ka-fai as Commander Mesa
- Joyce Godenzi as Kam Pik-fai / Yoshiko Kawashima
- Fennie Yuen as Tina
- Paul Chu as Lieutenant Mang Tai-hoi
- Corey Yuen as Brother Big Nose

== Production ==
The Raid is based on the historical events of the 1930s, when Japanese occupied Manchuria have set up the last Chinese emperor, Puyi, as their puppet leader.

== Release ==
The Raid was released on March 28, 1991, in Hong Kong. It was the 86th highest-grossing film in Hong Kong of the year, where it grossed a total of $3,694,660.

== Reception ==
In her book The Cinema of Tsui Hark, Lisa Morton stated that "despite an innovative use of comic book-style artwork and storytelling techniques, The Raid is the weakest of the Ching Siu-Tung/Tsui Hark collaborations."

== Bibliography ==
- Morton, Lisa (2001). The Cinema of Tsui Hark. McFarland. ISBN 0786451521.
