= Lists of publishing companies =

The following are lists of publishing companies.

== By language ==
- List of English-language book publishing companies
  - List of English-language literary presses
  - List of English-language small presses
- List of Romanian-language publishers
- List of Urdu language book publishing companies

== Others ==
- List of publishing companies of Albania
- List of British entomological publishers
- List of comics publishing companies
  - List of Golden Age comics publishers
- List of publishing companies of Estonia
- List of manga publishers
- List of manhua publishers
- List of largest book publishers of the United Kingdom
- List of pornographic book publishers
- List of publishers of children's books
- List of science fiction publishers
- List of self-publishing companies
- List of UK children's book publishers
- List of publishing companies of Ukraine
- List of university presses
- List of video game publishers
- List of women's presses

== See also ==
- List of book distributors
