= School Shock =

2015 Chinese animated series

SCHOOL SHOCK ( 雛蜂 B.E.E )

Basic information
- Author: Bái māo sunny(sūn héng) Chinese- 白貓sunny(孫恆）
- Type: Shōnen comics, Animation, action, science fiction, war
- Country of Origin: China
- Animation Studio: Haoliners Animation League
- Serial Website: Youyaoqi website- www.U17.com

School Shock, also known as Chu Feng B.E.E (simplified Chinese: 雏蜂; traditional Chinese: 雛蜂; pinyin: Chú Fēng; Jyutping: Co1 Fung1), Hinabachi (Japanese: 雛蜂), often stylized 雛蜂-B.E.E-, is a Chinese manhua and animated series. Originally a sci-fi webcomic, School Shock was adapted into an animation done by Haoliners Animation League when it gained popularity on the U17 comic website www .u17 .com (now redirected to bilibili comics homepage) . The first series 12 episodes. The main characters are Liuli, Baihua, Sun Hao Xuan, Zhou Zhong Rong, etc.

The series began airing in China on July 23, 2015, and in Japan on August 15, 2015. It is the first Chinese-made animated series to be broadcast simultaneously in China (in Mandarin) and Japan (in Japanese). Japanese critics described the series as Japanese anime produced in China and lacking Chinese creative elements.

School Shock comic books have also been published in Simplified Chinese by a Jilin publisher, and in Traditional Chinese by a Hong Kong publisher. A second season of School Shock was also announced in 2020 and the 6 episodes production was later finished that year.

== Introduction ==
In the year 2017, a new generation of arms race has begun, and a new type of weapon, the "Vanguards", has started to be widely utilized in military disputes. The heroine, LiuLi, a Vanguard has been on a mission for a long time, and her life has been seriously drained, and is about to be retired from the military. In the last 380 days of her life, she receives her last mission: to rescue a hostage in a civilian facility. At this time, she accidentally discovers that the boss of the hostage-taking is actually an ex-pointman. LiuLi despises the ex-soldier, who has been yelling for the government to hand over the "Son of Eden", and in order to solve this scum among the soldiers, a battle between the two soldiers begins. ......

== Characters ==
=== Main characters ===
Sun Haoxuan

Voice : Jingle Bell (Chinese version), Tachibana Shinnosuke (Japanese version) [7] Birthday: October 1 (Libra)

Protagonist. An ordinary high school student who likes to repair and modify machines, listen to music, keeping track of his bills, and getting discount cards and coupons for his cell phone. After getting involved in a series of events, his character slowly begins to become more opinionated, and he struggles to solve the mystery of his birth.

Liuli

Voiced by: Shan Xin (Chinese version), Hanazawa Kana (Japanese version) [7] Birthday: April 30 (Taurus)

The third generation of vanguard soldiers, whose bionic objects are bees, grew up as vanguard soldiers, so they did not have a normal life. They have a cold and arrogant personality but are not cold-blooded by nature. She is good at using various firearms and owns the heavily equipped support flying machine "B.E.E.". She is tasked with protecting Sun Haoxuan. At the beginning, She didn't have any good impression of Sun Haoxuan. But after having in-depth contact with him, She began to slowly change her attitude towards him. Hobbies include visiting the zoo, secretly collecting cute things and eating sweets.

BaiHua

Voice: Luo Rufei (Chinese version), Orikasa Fumiko (Japanese version) [7] Birthday: February 28 (Pisces)

Sun Haoxuan's senior student in high school has a smart mind, pure and beautiful appearance, and is as noble as the school belle.Likes online shopping, online chatting and being an online video anchor. Although She has an easy-going personality, She has an aura that is difficult to approach. In fact, She is the fifth-generation vanguard soldier. Her bionic object is a mantis. She uses two mechanical blades as weapons and is ordered to try to get close to Sun Haoxuan.

=== China Federation (NPSA) ===
Li Qiaoen

A former U federalist who served in the Chinese military was an old friend of Sun Haoxuan's mother. Responsible for assisting Liuli and arranging tasks.

Zhang Beihai

Sun Haoxuan's mother. He has a lively and cheerful personality and hates war. Army Ant Troop

Cecilia

Captain of the "Soldier Ants" unit. Shao Wei "Soldier Ant" unit squad leader.

Ellie

A member of the "Soldier Ant" unit. U Federation (alluding to the United States)

Onyma

U federal president. (Alluding to Obama, the 44th President of the United States)

== Terminology ==
Son of eden

Humans, born from the union of Eden and humans, have the ability to control nanoweapons. Because of their powerful capabilities, they are the center of competition among various countries.

Shengli City

Is a city built for the Children of Eden, the Children of Eden will be subject to all kinds of surveillance without interference. The classmates and teachers around Sun Haoxuan are all people sent by various forces to monitor Sun Haoxuan. The top soldiers in Shengli City are all women, in order to combine with Sun Haoxuan to mass-produce the Children of Eden.

Vanguard

Soldiers who transform themselves with nano-weapons have vitality, speed, reaction ability, and strength far beyond ordinary people. They also have special, state-of-the-art weapons and are an extension of the special forces. The bodies of general elite soldiers will continue to be corroded by nanomachines and eventually lose their value. Since the cost of maintaining the nanoweapons on the vanguard for one day is enough to buy a missile, most of the vanguards will eventually be destroyed.
