= Evil or Live =

Chinese manhua & anime series

网瘾禁区 / 理想禁区 Lixiang Jinqu
- Genre: Psychological, action
- Author: Li Xiaonan
- Publisher: Tencent
- Original run: 2015

- Evil or Live
- Anime television series
- Directed by: Dong Yi
- Produced by: Tang Yunkang
- Written by: Dong Yi
- Music by: Manels Favre; Max Huang
- Studio: Haoliners Animation League
- Licensed by: Crunchyroll
- Original network: Tokyo MX
- Original run: October 10, 2017 – January 2, 2018
- Episodes: 12

Evil or Live is a Chinese manhua published by Tencent authored and illustrated by Li Xiaonan. A donghua adaptation premiered in 2017.

== Plot ==
Young men and women are experiencing "net addiction", a condition which manifests as a series of negative emotions and which in turn causes them to withdraw further into the Internet and electronic devices. 17-year-old Hibiki has been involuntarily enrolled in a rehabilitation facility called the Elite Reeducation Academy, but the place is little more than a strict prison for Hibiki and others like him.

== Characters ==
Hibiki (黎響)
Voiced by: Shinichiro Ueda
Shin (孟進)
Voiced by: Koki Uchiyama
Shiori (織)
Voiced by: Chika Anzai
Shiori is Hibiki's love interest.

== Anime ==
The series started airing on Tokyo MX on October 10, 2017, for a total of 12 episodes, ending its broadcast on January 2, 2018. The opening theme is Soredemo Boku wa Ikiteiru (それでも僕は生きている, lit. I'm Still Alive) by NormCore. It is currently available for streaming on Crunchyroll. The series was directed and written by Dong Yi, produced by Tang Yunkang, and had music composed by Manels Favre and Max Huang. Liang Yuan served as character designer, and Zhao Xie was the animation director.

No.	Title	Original release date
1	"Standing on the Edge of Despair"; Transliteration: "Zetsubō no Fuchi ni Tatte" (Japanese: 絶望のふちに立って)	October 10, 2017
2	"Between Cruelty and Kindness"; Transliteration: "Tsumeta-sa to Yasashi-sa no Hazama de" (Japanese: 冷たさと優しさのはざまで)	October 17, 2017
3	"Short-Sighted Justice"; Transliteration: "Mukōmizuna Seigi" (Japanese: 向こう見ずな正義)	October 24, 2017
4	"Walking a Thorny Path"; Transliteration: "Ibara no Michi e Fumikone" (Japanese: いばらの道へ踏み込め)	October 31, 2017
5	"Their Parting of the Ways"; Transliteration: "Sorezore no Bunkiten" (Japanese: それぞれの分岐点)	November 7, 2017
6	"Further Into Darkness"; Transliteration: "Saranaru Yami no Naka e" (Japanese: さらなる闇の中へ)	November 14, 2017
7	"A Decision at Rock Bottom"; Transliteration: "Donzoko de no Ketsui" (Japanese: どん底での決意)	November 21, 2017
8	"Budding"; Transliteration: "Hōga" (Japanese: 萌芽)	November 28, 2017
9	"Evil Descending"; Transliteration: "Īburu Kōrin" (Japanese: イーブル降臨)	December 5, 2017
9.5	"Series Review"; Transliteration: "Sōshūhen" (Japanese: 総集編)	December 12, 2017
10	"Secrets to Be Hidden"; Transliteration: "Kakushitai Himitsu" (Japanese: 隠したい秘密)	December 19, 2017
11	"The Icy Wall of Despair"; Transliteration: "Zetsubō no Hyōheki" (Japanese: 絶望の氷壁)	December 26, 2017
12	"Evil or Live"; Transliteration: "Īburu oa Raibu" (Japanese: イーブル オア ライブ)	January 2, 2018
