= Hong Kong comics =

Comics created in Hong Kong

- Traditional Chinese: 香港漫畫
- Simplified Chinese: 香港漫画
Transcriptions
Standard Mandarin
- Hanyu Pinyin: Xiānggǎng Mànhuà
Yue: Cantonese
- Yale Romanization: Hēung góng maahn wá
- Jyutping: Hoeng1 gong2 maan6 waa2

Abbreviation
- Traditional Chinese: 港漫
- Simplified Chinese: 港画
Transcriptions
Standard Mandarin
- Hanyu Pinyin: Gǎngmàn
Yue: Cantonese
- Yale Romanization: Góng maahn
- Jyutping: Gong^{2} maan^{6}

Hong Kong comics are comics originally produced in Hong Kong.

== History ==
Sun Yat-Sen established the Republic of China in 1911 using Hong Kong's comics to circulate anti-Qing propaganda. Some of the comics that mirrored the early struggles of the transitional political and war periods were The True Record and Renjian Pictorial. By the time the Japanese occupied Hong Kong in 1941, all manhua activities had stopped. With the defeat of the Japanese in 1945, political mayhem between Chinese Nationalists and Communists took place. One of the critical comics, This Is a Cartoon Era by Renjian Huahui made note of the political backdrop at the time.

The turmoil in China continued into the 1950s and 1960s. The rise of Chinese immigration turned Hong Kong into the main manhua-ready market, especially with the baby boom generation of children. The most influential comic magazine for adults was the 1956 Cartoons World, which fueled the best-selling Uncle Choi. The availability of Japanese and Taiwanese comics challenged the local industry, selling at a pirated bargain price of 10 cents. Comics like Old Master Q were needed to revitalise the local industry. Actually, the development of Hong Kong's political comics is non-stop, comics artists got the idea based on the political situation in China or Hong Kong. Either pro-communist side or anti-communist side had published the political comics such as Ar-Chung Yen E-king's creations. Before the 1980s, many newspapers welcome submission of comics strips, because there was a huge competition between different newspapers, newspapers need to reformat usually, this situation brought a big demand of publisher and artists.

The arrival of television in the 1970s was a changing point. Bruce Lee's films dominated the era and his popularity launched a new wave of Kung Fu comic. The explicit violence helped sell comic books, and the Government of Hong Kong intervened with the Indecent Publication Law in 1975. Little Rascals was one of the pieces which absorbed all the social changes. The 1995 amendment on the Control of Obscene and Indecent Articles Ordinance have much influence on the industry. The materials would also bloom in the 1990s with work like McMug and three-part stories like "Teddy Boy", "Portland Street" and "Red Light District". Many famous painters such as Wong Yuk-Long appeared. A comics publishing company, The Jademan (Holdings) Ltd (now Culturecom Holdings Ltd.) Initial public offering in 1986. Chinese translation of Japanese comics are also very popular.

Since the 1950s, Hong Kong's comic market has been separate from that of mainland China. The handover of Hong Kong back to China in 1997 may signify a reunification of both markets. Depending on how cultural materials are to be handled, especially via self-censorship, the much larger audience in the mainland can be beneficial to both.

Sun Zi's Tactics by Lee Chi Ching won the first International Manga Award in 2007 and Feel 100% by Lau Wan Kit won the second International Manga Award in 2008.

In 2008, the South China Morning Post stated that Hong Kong comics tend to emphasise action sequences, and comics with martial art themes have the highest numbers of books/works sold in Hong Kong.

== Characteristics ==
Modern Chinese-style manhua characteristics is credited to the breakthrough art work of the 1982 Chinese Hero. It had innovative, realistic drawings with details resembling real people. Most manhua work from the 1800s to the 1930s contained characters that appeared serious. The initial start for Hong Kong manhua was based on the inspiration and developments in politics and cartooning in mainland China. The development of Hong Kong manhua not only has a strong tie with China but also followed China's tradition of the involvement of political themes and contents in the cartoon works. The development of mainstream Hong Kong manhua (cartoons) after the war was in the direction of leisure and entertainment reading rather than a serious critique of current events and political situations.

The influx of translated Japanese manga of the 1960s, as well as televised anime in Hong Kong also made a significant impression. Unlike manga, manhua comes in full colour with some panels rendered entirely in painting for the single issue format. However, the local manhua of Hong Kong shares cultural values and details with their readers, elements that cannot be found in Japanese manga. For example, like the "Old master Q", the author writes the life of the ordinary people and it turns to be very popular. Many of local produced comics are published weekly, and have published for many hundred volumes over many years and have not finished yet.

== See also ==
- Animation-Comic-Game Hong Kong
- Chinese animation
- Hong Kong Comics: A History of Manhua
- Manhua
