= The Daily Life of the Immortal King =

Chinese novel/donghua series by Kuxuan

- Promotional poster
- 仙王的日常生活
- Genre: Action; Adventure; Fantasy; Supernatural; Xianxia; Slice of life
- Based on: Xian Wang de Richang Shenghuo by Kuxuan
- Written by: Kuxuan (枯玄)
- Directed by: Li Haoling (李豪凌)
- Country of origin: China
- Original language: Mandarin Chinese
- No. of seasons: 5
- No. of episodes: 63

Production
- Animators: Haoliners Animation League (season 1); Pb Animation Co. Ltd (seasons 2–3); Liyu Culture (seasons 4–5)
- Production company: bilibili

Original release
- Network: bilibili
- Release: 18 January 2020 – present

The Daily Life of the Immortal King (Chinese: 仙王的日常生活; pinyin: Xiān Wáng de Rìcháng Shēnghuó) is a donghua based on the manhua, which itself is based on the Chinese novel by Kuxuan with the same name. This novel is published by Qidian in Chinese and Webnovel in English. It began publishing in 2017. As of 23 October 2026, the novel has 2609 chapters, most of which have been translated into English.

A donghua web series adaptation premiered on its video sharing service Bilibili on 18 January 2020, with its most recent season premiering on 14 December 2025. A sixth season has been announced.

== Voice cast ==
- Sun Lulu as Wang Ling, Er Dan (cockatoo), Xu Ying
- Qian Chen as Sun Rong
- Guo Hao Ran as Wang Zukang
- Xing Chao as Guo Hao
- Jin Xian as Zhuo Yi
- Gu Jiang Shan as Chen Chao
- Guan Shuai as Tuntian Ha, Liang Zheng
- XiXi as Jingke (Season 1–3)
- Fu Ting Yun as Jingke
- Zhang Fu Zheng as Tang Jingze, Xu Feng
- Li Shi Meng as Jiang Liuyue, Sword Sister
- Zhao Shuang as Yisha Bei, Yoshiko Kyuumiya

== Media ==
=== Donghua ===
The donghua was released on Bilibili on 18 January 2020. It is adapted from a novel that was first released on webnovel, with the same name and it had over a thousand chapters. Netflix is also streaming the first season beginning 30 June 2021. The Donghua was renewed for a second season set to premiere in the spring of 2021. An announcement with a trailer was published on the Bilibili website and YouTube. It began on 30 October 2021 and streamed on Funimation till 8 January 2022. On 20 July 2022, Crunchyroll announced an English dub of the first season. The first episode of the third season was released on 29 September 2022 with the second on 1 October.

==== Season 1 ====
Wang Ling is a cultivation prodigy who has advanced to a new realm every two years since infancy, making him a nearly invincible being with power he struggles to control. At sixteen, he enrolls in senior high school, intending to live a low-key student life. However, a series of escalating incidents repeatedly threatens to expose his true identity and abilities.

==== Season 2 ====
When the shadow assassin had been dealt with and Wang Ling's plan to live a normal life might work, a new global threat appears and he is the only one able to save the world.

==== Season 3 ====
After the second demon invasion has been dealt with. A new family appears, Kyuumiya family, a group of Yakuza. This season revolves around the exorcist family's attempt to obtain demons and use them to control the world.

==== Season 4 ====
To be able to see the true Heaven, practitioners utilize all available resources to achieve the Three thousand ways of heaven. In search of one of the Three Thousand ways of heaven, "High Level Swordsmanship", modern swordsman Yi Jianchuan and his younger brother, Evil Sword God Chen Nanxuan, went in different directions. Wang Ling was concerned with which heavenly path to follow today to have a tranquil daily life, while the rest of the world was concerned with how to maintain the heavenly path.

==== Season 5 ====
A donghua web series adaptation premiered on its video sharing service Bilibili on 18 January 2020, with its most recent season releasing its final episode on 25 February 2024. A fifth season premiered on 14 December 2025.

==== Season 6 ====
Confirm by the author that it will be aired 2027
