= An Ideal World =

Chinese manhua written by Weidong Chen and illustrated by Chao Peng

- Yen Press edition of An Ideal World

尋找自我的世界 Seek Self's World
- Genre: Action/adventure, fantasy
- Author: Weidong Chen
- Illustrator: Chao Peng
- Publisher: Tian Jin Creator World Comic Co.
- English publisher: NA: Yen Press
- Other publishers: TriWorks (China) Zhiyin Magazine (China) Xiao Pan (France) Cambridge University Press (South Korea) Shenjie (Taiwan)
- Original run: 2006–2007
- Volumes: 5 (original); 1 (English release)

An Ideal World (simplified Chinese: 寻找自我的世界; traditional Chinese: 尋找自我的世界; pinyin: xún zhǎo zì wǒ de shì jiè "Seek Self's World") is a full-color Chinese manhua authored by Weidong Chen and illustrated by Chao Peng. The series was released in five volumes and published in China by Tian Jin Creator World Comic Company (simplified Chinese: 天津神界漫画公司; traditional Chinese: 天津神界漫畫公司; pinyin: Tiān jīn shén jiè màn huà gōng sī) under the title Seek Self's World and as part of the Cunren Fairy Tale series. An Ideal World was licensed by various other companies and released simultaneously with the original publisher between 2006 and 2007. The French manhua-publishing company Xiao Pan licensed the series as "Un Monde Idéal" ("An Ideal World") and Yen Press later announced at the New York Comic Con that they had licensed the series from Xiao Pan. Yen Press released it in North America as one volume called An Ideal World.

An Ideal World follows the struggles of A You, a young man who, believing he has no luck, does not attempt to succeed in life even though others advise him to make his own luck. When he accidentally gets on the wrong bus, A You finds himself in the suburbs, where he takes shelter from the rain in a large tree and takes a nap. After waking up, A You happens upon the house of an old man, who sends him to an alternate world so that he may resolve his troubles. A You grows to enjoy the fantasy world and does not wish to return to his harsh reality. An Ideal World garnered mixed reception from Western critics, who objected mainly to the beginning and praised the overall story, artwork and themes.

== Plot ==
A You is a troubled 19-year-old who dislikes his life; he feels that his entire life is unlucky, yet he avoids hard work and prefers to be lazy. He is encouraged by the people around him to work harder and told that he can change his life if he takes control of it, but A You refuses to accept these notions. One day, he accidentally takes the wrong bus and finds himself in the suburbs of his city. A You enjoys his time away and takes shelter inside of a large, hollow tree when it begins to rain. After taking a nap and waking up, he wanders until he comes across a small, green old man referred to as Grandpa Beard. Grandpa Beard decides to help A You with his problems and transports him to a "utopia" called Abi Port in an alternate world.

Abi Port is home to several humans, anthropomorphic beings, and other creatures, some of which look similar to people A You knows in his world. A You is found by members of a circus, who invite him to join them in their act. Although he lacks experience, he finds that he can perform well and begins to develop feelings for a young performer named Anan. He meets others who give him advice on enjoying work and life, particularly the "Master of Universal Love", an anthropomorphic zebra who toiled to earn his position and helps others free of charge.

After A You spends time in this world, Grandpa Beard decides that his problems are solved and returns to take him away from the imaginary world. A You protests, not wanting to return to the cold reality, but Grandpa Beard captures him and tells him that he must change that reality if he dislikes it. Returned to his own world, A You awakens in the tree he had taken shelter in and heads back to his house, where he finds his worried friends and family waiting for him. A You's experiences at Abi Port inspire him to work harder, and he eventually marries his co-worker and friend Su Fei. The two are shown years later at the grand opening of Grandpa Beard's Fun House, a restaurant themed after Grandpa Beard, where A You sees he will accomplish his dream and spread happiness.

== Release ==
An Ideal World, authored by Weidong Chen and illustrated by Chao Peng, was originally published in China by the Tian Jin Creator World Comic Company and entitled Seek Self's World. It is part of the company's Cunren Fairy Tale series. An Ideal World was licensed by the French manhua company Xiao Pan, as well as several other companies, which released it in five volumes entitled Un Monde Idéal ("An Ideal World") from September 15, 2006 to March 14, 2007. Contracts were made that allowed for the French, South Korean, Taiwanese, and Mainland Chinese companies to release the five volumes at the same time as the original company; French, Chinese, and Korean language editions were published through a partnership with Beijing Total Vision Culture Spreads. An Ideal World's global release was meant to aid in the development of the Chinese comic industry and create a new business model, and its release marked the first simultaneous global release for a comic. Xiao Pan also made an omnibus of the original Chinese version available for purchase.

At the 2008 New York Comic Con, American-based graphic novel publisher Yen Press announced that they had acquired the rights to publish An Ideal World and would release it in full color. Rights were acquired from Xiao Pan, rather than Tian Jin Creator World Comic Co. On March 24, 2009, Yen Press released An Ideal World in North America as a single volume; at 176 pages long, the volume also includes character sketches, the additional French covers, and information on the author, illustrator, and Chinese publisher.

An Ideal World was licensed for release in Mainland China by TriWorks and Zhiyin Magazine and in South Korea by the South Korean branch of Cambridge University Press. Shenjie published the series in Taiwan. At a conference held in February 2006, Tian Jin Creator World Comic Company announced that negotiations were being made to release An Ideal World in other European countries, Japan, and with traditional Chinese characters in Taiwan.

== Reception ==
An Ideal World has received mixed reviews from Western critics, who generally praised the book's artwork and second half but did not like the beginning. School Library Journal's Lori Henderson reviewed An Ideal World positively; she praised the "Wizard of Oz feel" ending and the message that A You "controls his life, and he has the power to change it". Henderson called the characters "great" and the world "fantastic", also noting that the "cartoonish" and "exaggerated" artwork worked with the story. However, she remarked that the beginning of An Ideal World was "slow and plodding" and could "leave you wondering if it's ever going to go anywhere". Another School Library Journal critic, Joanna Fabicon, felt that the lessons and themes were "unimaginative", which made the artwork "a waste of visual whimsy".

Sam Kusek of PopCulture Shock also reviewed An Ideal World positively, grading it as a B+. Kusek applauded the artwork, saying that "colors really jump out" and set "the mood of the scene well, while keeping the backgrounds alive", and that character designs enhance "the mystical and magical elements of the story". Kusek liked the plot, but felt it was predictable; however, he noted that the main element and focus was the "philosophy of life" and that, overall, An Ideal World "flows really well". Writing for Comics Worth Reading, Ed Sizemore gave the book a mixed review. Sizemore wrote that he wished the message was conveyed "more [subtly]" and criticized the beginning of the book as "the toughest to get through", but felt the "pace and readability improve" afterwards. He praised the art as "gorgeous" with "lots of eye candy" for those who enjoy fantasy artwork. Overall, Sizemore thought An Ideal World was "wasted potential", with too much emphasis placed on the message, detracting from the storytelling.

Publishers Weekly praised An Ideal World for its message and art, but criticized how "the book gets bogged down in talky heavy-handedness, as if someone put nice fantasy illustrations into a business self-help book". R. Bézard, a French critic for BD Gest, rated the first volume of the Xiao Pan edition of An Ideal World with two out of five stars. Bézard stated that the volume did not draw in the reader or give any indication of A You's future adventure. However, Bézard praised the artwork as expressive and called it a cross between Dragon Ball Z and Fruits Basket.
