= 漫画 =

漫画, 漫畫, or 漫畵 are "comics" in East Asian languages.

- Manhua: Chinese comics.
- Manga: Japanese comics.
- Manhwa: Korean comics.
