= The Silver Guardian =

Chinese manhua and anime series

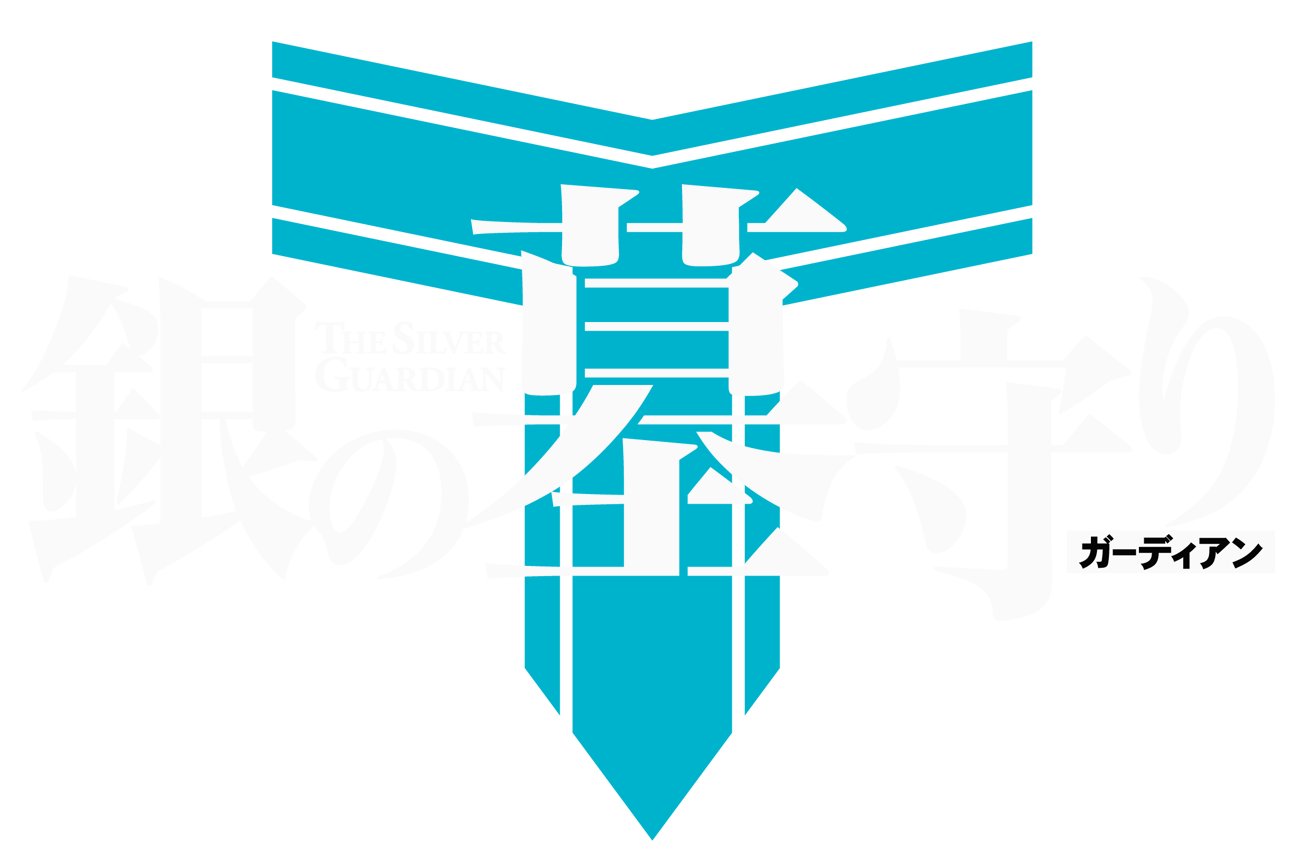
- The Silver Guardian Logo

銀之守墓人 銀の墓守り (Yín Zhī Shǒu Mù Rén (Chinese) Gin no Gādian (Japanese))
- Genre: Action, Drama
- Manhua
- Author: Zero League
- Published by: Tencent
- Magazine: Tencent AC
- Original run: February 9, 2015 – June 5, 2021
- Anime television series

Silver Guardian I
- Directed by: Masahiko Ōkura
- Produced by: Li Haoling
- Written by: Masahiko Ōkura; Hidefumi Kimura
- Music by: Minako Seki
- Studio: Emon
- Licensed by: NA: Funimation
- Original network: Tokyo MX
- Original run: April 1, 2017 – June 17, 2017
- Episodes: 12
- Anime television series

Silver Guardian II
- Directed by: Li Haoling (Note: Credited as Chief Director (総監督, Sō Kantoku).); Ken Andō
- Produced by: Li Haoling
- Written by: Li Haoling
- Music by: Minako Seki
- Studio: Haoliners Animation League; Blade
- Licensed by: NA: Funimation
- Original network: Tokyo MX
- Original run: January 13, 2018 – February 17, 2018
- Episodes: 6

The Silver Guardian (simplified Chinese: 银之守墓人; traditional Chinese: 銀之守墓人; pinyin: Yín Zhī Shǒu Mù Rén) is a Chinese web manhua created by Zero League and illustrated by Moon Cake. It was published by Tencent through their Tencent AC Web Comic service, compiling the series into 237 chapters. An anime television series adaptation produced by Haoliners Animation League's Japanese branch Emon and directed by Masahiko Ōkura premiered on Tokyo MX on 1 April 2017. The series is licensed by Funimation. A second season produced by Haoliners themselves and animated by Blade premiered in January 2018.

== Plot ==
The story follows a High school student and intense gamer Suigin Riku as he attends the prestigious Shinryou Private Academy, a school for the elite and the wealthy. However Suigin is anything but; in fact, he is very poor and has to work many part-time jobs just to pay for his tuition. One day while he is working a pool cleaning job one of his many jobs, he sees a cat drowning and without hesitation jumps in to save the kitty. To much surprise, it turns out he can't swim either and flails around drowning. Luckily a girl came by, by the name Rei Riku and saves him. He didn't know this but she was the daughter of the game developer that created his favorite game.

He also meets another girl a new friend he meets in Dungeon Century, his favorite online RPG. However, when it is announced that the game is scheduled to shut down he is heartbroken to know that his adventures with her are coming to a close. However, after the game is shut down he finds out that she and Rei Riku are the same person. Later he receives a new game to replace Dungeon Century—a tomb raiding game called Grave Buster. But when Rei is suddenly kidnapped, Suigin is pulled inside Grave Buster to save her.

Gin no Guardian follows Suigin as he fights through Grave Buster to save Rei, while uncovering his past.

== Characters ==
Characters	English	Japanese
Suigin Lu	Kyle Phillips	Jun Fukuyama
Rei Lu	Amber Lee Connors	Yuka Saitō
Ranshou	Jason Liebrecht	
Maki	Sara Ragsdale	
Wanchoi	Jad Saxton	Sara Matsumoto

== Episode list ==
=== Season 1 ===
No.	Title	Original release date
1	"Suigin Meets Rika Rei" "Shui Yin, Lu Lian to Deau!" (水銀、陸 怜と出会う！)	1 April 2017
2	"Suigin Gets Closer to Riku Rei!" "Shui Yin, Lu Lian to Chikazuku!" (水銀、陸 怜と近づく！)	8 April 2017
3	"Suigin Regrets the End!" "Shui Yin, Shuumatsu wo Ureeru!" (水銀、終末を憂える！)	15 April 2017
4	"Suigin Receives a Loss!" "Shui Yin, Haiboku wo Kissuru!" (水銀、敗北を喫する！)	22 April 2017
5	"Suigin Inherits a Legacy!" "Shui Yin, Isan wo Souzoku suru!" (水銀、遺産を相続する！)	29 April 2017
6	"Suigin Pledges Himself to Riku Rei!" "Shui Yin, Lu Lian ni Chikau!" (水銀、陸 怜に誓う！)	6 May 2017
7	"Suigin's Chance Encounter With His Grandfather!" "Shui Yin, Sofu to Kaikou suru!" (水銀、祖父と邂逅する！)	13 May 2017
8	"Suigin Becomes the Last Tomb Guardian!" "Shui Yin, Saigo no Hakamori to Naru!" (水銀、最後の墓守りとなる！)	20 May 2017
9	"Suigin Learns to Play the Grave Robbing Game!" "Shui Yin, Toukutsu Game wo Manabu!" (水銀、盗掘ゲームを学ぶ！)	27 May 2017
10	"Suigin Stands Once Again!" "Shui Yin, Futatabi Tatsu!" (水銀、再び起つ！)	3 June 2017
11	"Suigin Meets Takeshi!" "Shui Yin, Takeshi to Deau!" (水銀、タケシと出会う！)	10 June 2017
12	"Suigin's New Journey!" "Shui Yin, Aratanaru Tabidachi!" (水銀、新たなる旅立ち！)	17 June 2017

=== Season 2 ===
No.	Title	Original release date
1	"The Three From the Training Institute / Rin's True Identity" "kyotei shono 3 to / Rin no shotai" (教程所の3人 / リンの正体)	13 January 2018
2	"Titan Goes Berserk / A Bewildered Suigin" "titan no boso / kon wakuno Suigin" (ティターンの暴走/困惑の水銀)	20 January 2018
3	"First Ally / The Conquest Begins" "hajimete no nakama / koryakuno kaishi" (はじめての仲間/攻略の開始)	27 January 2018
4	"Aslan's Trial / The Final Countdown" "Asuran no shiren / saigono ka untodaun" (アスランの試練/最後のカウントダウン)	3 February 2018
5	"The Door to Zero / A Reunion Through the Mirror" "zerono tobira / kagami koshi no saikai" (ゼロの扉/鏡超しの再会)	10 February 2018
6	"The Crazy Randengyoku / Billion Player" "boran no aida tama / birion pureiya" (暴乱の藍田玉/ビリオンプレイヤー)	17 February 2018

== Reception ==
As of March 2016, the comic had been viewed over 418 million times.
