= Haoliners Animation League =

Chinese animation company

- Industry: Animation
- Founded: 2013; 13 years ago
- Founder: Li Haoling
- Headquarters: Shanghai, China
- Owner: Bilibili
- Parent: Shanghai Yarun Culture Communications Co., Ltd.

Chinese name
- Simplified Chinese: 绘梦者新动画联盟
- Traditional Chinese: 繪夢者新動畫聯盟
- Hanyu Pinyin: Huìmèngzhě Xīn Dònghuà Liánméng

Japanese name
- Kanji: 絵夢アニメーション
- Romanization: Emon Animēshon
- Website: www.haoliners.net/en/index.html

Haoliners Animation League is a Chinese animation studio based in Shanghai and established in 2013. Its subsidiary Animation Company Emon operates in Japan and South Korea, and Haoliners maintains a Korean animation branch as well.

The studio is currently owned by Chinese streaming service Bilibili.

== Animation directors ==
- Li Haoling
- Wang Xin
- Chen Ye
- Dong Yi

== Works ==
=== Television series ===
A list of television series animated or co-animated by Haoliners Animation League or its subsidiaries.

- Spiritpact (2017, animated by Haoliners Animation League Korea)
- Evil or Live (2017–2018)
- The Silver Guardian (2017–2018, second season co-animated with Blade)
- A Centaur's Life (2017)
- To Be Heroine (2018, co-animated with LAN Studio)
- Spiritpact: Bond of the Underworld (2018)

=== Original net animations ===
A list of ONAs animated or co-animated by Haoliners Animation League or its subsidiaries.

- Mantou Diary (2013–2014, co-animated with LAN Studio)
- Lu Shidai (2013–2014)
- Duan Nao (2014–2015)
- Yaoguai Mingdan (2014–2015)
- Chinese Mystery Man (2014–2016, co-animated with Pb Animation)
- School Shock (2015)
- Fox Spirit Matchmaker (2015–present)
- I'm Bai Xiaofei (2015–2016)
- Yaoguai Mingdan 2 (2017)
- Hitori no Shita: Second Season (2018)
- Xiao Lu He Xiao Lan (2018-present)
- Tong Ling Fei (2018–2019)
- The Daily Life of the Immortal King (2020)
- Heaven Official's Blessing (2020–2021)
- Legend of Exorcism (2020–present)
- Link Click (2021-present)

=== Other productions ===
A list of other productions Haoliners or its subsidiaries produced, but did not animate.

- Congqian Youzuo Lingjianshan (2015–2016, animated by Studio Deen)
- To Be Hero (2016, animated by Studio LAN)
- Flavors of Youth (2018, animated by CoMix Wave Films)
