= Xiao Pan =

French comics publisher and distributor of Chinese manhua

- Industry: Comics
- Headquarters: 20, rue de Panafé; 46100 Figeac, France

Xiao Pan is a French publisher and distributor of full-color Chinese manhua, both in French-language and original Chinese form. They are based in France, with offices in Belgium, Switzerland, and Canada. Several of their titles have been licensed for translation and release to English-speaking audiences.

== History ==
Xiao Pan debuted their work at the Festival international d'Angoulême in 2006, and since then has published works by over three dozen creators. At New York Comic-Con on April 19, 2008, Tokyopop announced it will debut its new full-color Tokyopop Graphic Novels line in February 2009 with one of Xiao Pan's works, Orange.

== Selected authors and works ==
- Benjamin: Orange, Remember, One Day, Flash
- Nie Jun: Diu Diu, My Street
- Pocket Chocolate: Butterfly in the Air
- Zhang Xiao Yu: Au Fond du Rêve, L'envol
- Lee Shipeng: Dr Forlen
- Liu Feng, Dream
- Jian Yi, Five Colors
- Chen Weidong and Peng Chao: Un Monde Idéal, Le Voyage en Occident
- Ji Di: My Way
- Ji An: Niumao
- Li Yao: La Quête de l'esprit Céleste
