= Spiritpact =

Chinese web manhua by Pingzi

- Also known as: Spiritpact: Bond of the Underworld (season 2)
- Genre: Action, Supernatural, Yaoi
- Created by: Pingzi
- Written by: Reiko Torii
- Directed by: Li Haoling (season 1); Liang Zhenzhe (season 2)
- Countries of origin: China; South Korea (season 1)
- Original languages: Chinese; Japanese
- No. of seasons: 2
- No. of episodes: 22

Production
- Producers: Tang Yunkang; Li Haoling
- Running time: 22–23 minutes
- Production companies: Haoliners Animation League; Haoliners Korea (season 1)

Original release
- Network: Tokyo MX, Bilibili
- Release: January 7, 2017 – May 11, 2018

Spiritpact (Chinese: 灵契; pinyin: Ling Qi) is a Chinese web manhua by Pingzi and published by Tencent on Tencent Comic. An animated series adaptation by Japanese screenwriter Reiko Torii and Chinese director Li Haoling was released in China online from June 21 to November 1, 2016, and aired in Japan between January 7, 2017 and March 11, 2017 on Tokyo MX. The series was animated by the South Korean branch of Haoliners. It was streamed by Crunchyroll outside of Asia.

== Characters ==
- You Keika (Chinese: 杨敬华, pinyin: Yang Jinghua)

Voiced by: Yūichi Iguchi (Japanese), Li Lanling (Chinese)
He is the heir of an old and famous exorcist. He is a direct descendant of You Nei and is able to wield the sword Rakugetsu. Ever since his parents died, he lived a life of poverty. Soon after, he worked part-time as a fortune teller and computer recovery to make money. One night, in the junkyard he meets Tanmoku-ki fighting an evil spirit. After their meeting, he died in an accident and became a spirit. Soon after, he is asked by Tanmoku-ki to form a "pact" with him. You Keika becomes a spirit shadow of Tanmoku-ki.
He is a carefree character, but is quite emotional at times. Initially very weak and unable to fight, he gains power later in the series, and is called The Most Powerful Spirit Shadow. Once he learns more about Ki, he proclaims his loyalty and resolves to protect Ki at all costs.

- Tanmoku Ki (Chinese: 端木熙, pinyin: Duanmu Xi)

Voiced by: Shunsuke Takeuchi (Japanese), Liu Mingyue (Chinese)
He is the 13th Youmeshi and head of the Tanmoki, the most powerful exorcist family and a descendant of Tanmoku Rakugetsu. Being an illegitimate child, he is called in by the main family after his parents died. He formed a "pact" with You Keika. He always protects You Keika from people, going so far as to pass an order that no one is to punish Keika, even if he kills him. He also gives Rakugetsu (the sword) to Keika. His fiancée is Shin Shiyou.

Immediately after Keika's death, he saw Rakugetsu's spirit emerge and makes a bet with him that if he prevents Keika's soul from breaking for a year, then Rakugetsu will stop.

Ki has a rather cold personality with all the people around him, including his grandmother, who is his only ally in the household and even his fiance; but strangely, he cares very much about Keika. He has very strong spiritual power. To keep this body pure from impurities, he does not eat meat, and also keeps himself free from wounds, as he cannot have blood transfusions even if he is severely injured. As a child, he had gotten a scratch from Rakugetsu, which sealed off a little of his power, but he gets it all back when Rakugetsu is finally sheathed. He even has to wear an earring so that his overwhelming power is controlled.

- Shin Shiyou (Chinese: 秦詩瑤, pinyin: Qin Siyao)

Voiced by: Rumi Ookubo
A spiritualist and a holder of Nenyou constitution. Shiyou was chosen as the fiancée of Tanmoku Ki due to her powers that can heal the Youmeishi. Knowing that the spirit shadow will have a close relationship with his master, she is jealous of Keika, as Ki is always cold towards her. Even so, she trusts Keika and calls him the strongest spirit shadow. She is fiercely loyal to Ki, supports him and understands that he toils with his position.

- Intetsu (Chinese: 寅哲, pinyin: Yinzhe)

Voiced by: Noriaki Sugiyama
Demon Master of Mount Ura and the spirit shadow of a former Youmeshi. Initially, he antagonizes You Keika, trying to make him usurp his position. But after his powers awaken, he deems himself no match to Keika and leaves him alone, though after making Keika promise to protect Ki. He is also bound to the Mount Ura, and cannot leave its boundaries. He also claims to have rights to all the Youmeshi.

- Kau

Voiced by: Sorami Yuki

- Obaa-sama

Voiced by: Yōko Matsuoka
Ki's grandmother, also Jimei's grandmother. She is the matriarch of the family, and her words are final. Normally of a kind disposition, he becomes tough when family matters are concerned. She is the one who appointed Ki as the head of the family, and still stubbornly refuses to transfer the charge to Jimei, no matter how dire the situation.

- Shito Ritsu (Chinese: 司徒律, pinyin: Situ Lü)

Voiced by: Toshiyuki Toyonaga
He is a spirit master, who excels in controlling spirits. He bears a strong grudge against Ki, although the reasons are not clearly known - sometimes, he gives childish reasons like looks and other times, he mentions that it is because Ki killed his two most precious people. He tried to get Ki's birth date from Keika, almost breaking apart his spirit (and thus almost killing him) so that he could kill Ki. Later, he also stops Ki and Keika from reaching the Tanmoki mansion, until he is defeated by Keika.

- Shitsuji

Voiced by: Kashii Shouto
Butler of the Tanmoki family. He is Ritsu's father. He is later dismissed and sent out of the mansion along with his son for attacking Keika.

- Tanmoku Jiyun (Chinese: 端木寺蕓, pinyin: Duanmu Siyun)

Voiced by: Hitomi Nabatame
Legitimate daughter of the Tanmoki family. She does not seem to bear a grudge against Ki, but does not seem to be supporting either, only following the decision of the family head, her grandmother, that Ki is the next head of the family. She also holds considerable Youmeshi power, though not as much as Ki. She plots behind the curtains to somehow bring down Ki and get herself to be the next head.

- Tanmoku Jimei (Chinese: 端木寺明, pinyin: Duanmu Siming)

Voiced by: Miyake Takahiro
Ki's half-brother and the Tanmoki family's secretary. He serves Ki as his job, but supports Jiyun from the shadows. He also has powers with him, and had used it to contain Keika at Jimei's command.

- Tanmoku Rakugetsu (Chinese: 端木落月, pinyin: Duanmu Luoyue)

Voiced by: Ken Takeuchi
Ancestor of Tanmoku Ki. He was a powerful Youmeshi, who later became corrupted at heart. He spent most of him time with his servant, Shisei, whom he considered as family, but dismissed him in his later days. When he finally started killing civilians, he was sealed off by Shisei, using the sword Rakugetsu. However, when Keika dies, he is released from his seal, and he claims that he will be free to do whatever he wants once Keika's soul departs after seven days.
He is often shown with his eyes blindfolded by a white strip of cloth, sometimes even bleeding severely from both eyes. But in the last scene, he takes his blindfold to reveal a missing left eye.

- You Nei/Shisei

A loyal servant of Tanmoku Rakugetsu. He was known as the one-armed spiritualist and feared by even the strongest of demons, even if he was not hostile against them. He spent his days taking care of Rakugetsu until he was dismissed. He came back after Rakugetsu turned evil, to seal Rakugetsu with the sword that he had created with his own arm. The sword later came to be known as Rakugetsu sword, and was passed down the Tanmoki family as family heirloom.

== Episodes ==
No.	Title	Original release date
1	"Suddenly, a Pact with a Spirit?"; Transliteration: "Rei to no Keiyaku wa Totsuzen ni?" (Japanese: 霊との契約は突然に？)	January 7, 2017
You Keika is a failed exorcist who makes a living by fortune telling and doing personal computer repairs. One day he witnesses a silver-haired man, Tanmoku Ki, fighting against an evil spirit. Failing to hide himself You Keika gets noticed by the exorcist. The start of the fated story: will they be friends, enemies or ...
2	"What Attracted You to Him?"; Transliteration: "Kare ni Hika Reta Wake" (Japanese: カレに惹かれたワケ)	January 14, 2017
When Shin Shiyou arrives at the airport terminal, she is received by Tanmoku Ki, but he drops her at a hotel. She introduces herself to You Keika as Tanmoku Ki's fiancé, but Tanmoku Ki is pretty cold towards her. Once they reach the hotel, You Keika goes to her room to invite her to the next day's dinner, but they both get trapped by an evil spirit. Although Shin Shiyou was telling him that she chose Tanmoku Ki as her fiancé only because of his face and status, while trapped within the evil spirit, You Keika witnesses her feeling from a child, where she was shy, but always trying to connect with Tanmoku Ki, even as he was cold towards her, and people deemed her as unworthy to be his fiancé. The evil spirit feeds on her negative feelings and drives her to kill You Keika (even when he's dead) In the present, Tanmoku Ki helps You Keika draw out a sword using their spirit pact, and they succeed in rescuing Shin Shiyou.
3	"Beware of Sleeping Together!"; Transliteration: "Soine ni Go Chūi!" (Japanese: 添い寝にご注意！)	January 21, 2017
4	"What I Can Do to Protect You"; Transliteration: "Kimi o Suru tame ni Dekiru Koto" (Japanese: 君を守るためにできること)	January 21, 2017
5	"Forever Together with You"; Transliteration: "Itsumo demo Anata to Tomo ni" (Japanese: いつまでもあなたとともに)	January 28, 2017
6	"A Kind Sigh"; Transliteration: "Yasashī Toiki" (Japanese: 優しい吐息)	February 11, 2017
Ki takes You home for the seventh day funeral rites. Ki kisses You giving him "the breath of life" which allows him to touch things in the human world. Ki’s siblings investigate more into You’s past. You has flash backs to previous life involving mysterious man with white hair. Ki gets into a fight with thugs. After sharing a heart warming moment, You goes into past life and stabs Ki through the chest while driving causing the car to wreck.
7	"Unbeatable Spirit"; Transliteration: "Makenai Kokoro" (Japanese: 負けないこころ)	February 18, 2017
8	"Turbulence with a Chance of Dilemma"; Transliteration: "Haran Tokidoki Kyūchi" (Japanese: 波乱ときどき窮地)	February 25, 2017
9	"The Final Decision"; Transliteration: "Saigo no Sentaku" (Japanese: 最後の選択)	March 4, 2017
10	"Never Let Go, Never..."; Transliteration: "Zettai Hanarenai, Zutto..." (Japanese: ぜったい離れない､ずっと…)	March 11, 2017
11	"The Final Decision"; Transliteration: "Tamashī no Chikai" (Japanese: 魂の誓い)	February 24, 2018
12	"Seeing Is Believing"; Transliteration: "Hyakubun wa Ikken ni Shikazu" (Japanese: 百聞は一見に如かず)	March 3, 2018
13	"Blood-Stained Snow"; Transliteration: "Yuki ni Nijimu Chi" (Japanese: 雪ににじむ血)	October 11, 2018
14	"Most Special Person"; Transliteration: "Dare Yori mo Taisetsu na Hito" (Japanese: 誰よりも大切な人)	March 17, 2018
15	"Mirror of the Underworld"; Transliteration: "Yomi no Kagami" (Japanese: 黄泉の鏡)	March 24, 2018
16	"Elegy"; Transliteration: "Banka" (Japanese: 挽歌)	March 31, 2018
17	"Waiting in the Future"; Transliteration: "Mirai de Matteru" (Japanese: 未来で待ってる)	April 7, 2018
18	"The Scene That He Sees"; Transliteration: "Aitsu no Miru Keshiki" (Japanese: あいつの見る景色)	April 14, 2018
19	"His True Identity"; Transliteration: "Kare no Shōtai" (Japanese: 彼の正体)	April 21, 2018
20	"Secret Feelings"; Transliteration: "Himetaru Omoi" (Japanese: 秘めたる思い)	April 28, 2018
21	"Things I Want to Say"; Transliteration: "Tsuetaikoto" (Japanese: 伝えたいこと)	May 5, 2018
22	"The Bonds That Bind Me"; Transliteration: "Boku o Tsunagitomeru Kizuna" (Japanese: 僕をつなぎとめる絆)	May 12, 2018

== Music ==
The opening theme song of the donghua is "MUGENDAI" "无限大" by Yu Jiaoyan and the ending song is "Endless Stories" by RiyO.
