= List of manhua publishers =

This is a list of manhua publishers around the world.

== Brazil ==
- Editora Abril
- Ediouro
- Editora Figura
- Panini Comics
- Conrad Editora

== China ==
- Bilibili
- Tencent Animation and Comics

== France ==
- Xiao Pan
- Glénat
- Urban China

== Hong Kong ==
- HK Comics Ltd.
- Culturecom Holdings Limited
- The One Comics Publishing Ltd

== Indonesia ==
- M&C Comics

== Singapore ==
- TCZ Studio

== Taiwan ==
- Sharp Point Publishers

== United Kingdom ==
- Bamboo Press Ltd

== United States ==
- ComicsOne
- DrMaster
- Tokyopop
- Yen Press
