= Uncle Choi =

Hong Kong manhua by Hui Guan-man

- Uncle Choi

財叔 Cái shū
- Genre: Humor/comedy, war
- Author: Hui Guan-man
- Original run: 1958–1970s

Uncle Choi (simplified Chinese: 财叔; traditional Chinese: 財叔; pinyin: Cái shū) was a popular manhua in Hong Kong. It was created by Hui Guan-man (許冠文), and released in 1958. Publication ceased in the mid 1970s.

== Background ==
Uncle Choi was the best selling comic in the 1950s to early 1960s. The comic is considered a creative break away from traditional lianhuanhua. The story was able to adjust with the different time periods and make changes associated with social issues. It is also one of the most successful comic to come out prior to the arrival of television broadcasts.

The popularity only faded when the story became over the top with laser guns, spy gadgets and non traditional weapons, which turned off some readers.

== Story ==
The comic began more or less as a comedy. Eventually the story developed into a focus against the Japanese occupation and the plot became more serious. The character Uncle Choi became a war hero.

== Format ==
Some of the titles read from left to right, while others read from right to left. The book was different in size at 5x7, instead of 3.6 x 5 inches.

== Film adaptation ==
A Hong Kong film adaptation of the manhua, titled The Raid, was made in 1991. The film was directed by Ching Siu-tung and Tsui Hark, and starred Dean Shek as Uncle Choi.

== See also ==
- Old Master Q
