= List of publishing companies of Albania =

List of publishing companies in Albania

This is a list of publishing companies in Albania.

== Publishing companies ==
Publishing house	Founded	Director
Naim Frashëri Publishing House	1946	—
8 Nëntori Publishing House	1973	—
Morava Publishing House	1991	Artan Selenica
Dituria Publishing House	1991	Petrit Ymeri
Uegen Publishing House	1991	Xhevahir Lleshi
Onufri Publishing House	1992	Bujar Hudhri
Toena Publishing House	1993	Irena Toçi
Logoreci Publishing House	1994	Pjerin Logoreci
Aeditions Publishing House	1995	—
Çabej Publishing House	1997	Brikena Çabej
Plejad Publishing House	1997	Ndriçim Kulla
55 Publishing House	1997	Fahri Balliu
Ombra GVG Publishing House	1998	Gëzim Tafa
Albas Publishing House	2000	Rita Petro
Dudaj Publishing House	2001	Arlinda Dudaj
IDK Publishing House	2001	Piro Misha
Ideart Publishing House	2002	—
Pegi Publishing House	2005	Loreta Berhami
Botart Publishing House	2005	Ylli Molla
Saras Publishing House	2008	Besnik Myftari
Pika pa sipërfaqe Publishing House	2009	Ataol Kaso, Arlind Novi
Botem Publishing House	2012	—
Pema Publishing House	2015	Edon Zeneli
Poeteka Publishing House	—	Arian Leka
Bota Shqiptare Publishing House	—	Genti Gjonaj
