= Wang Weixing =

Chinese army scholar and general

Wang Weixing (Chinese: 王衛星; pinyin: Wáng Wèixīng; born 1958) is a senior scholar for the People's Liberation Army (PLA) in China, and a board member of the Association for Relations Across the Taiwan Strait (ARATS). Wang attracted worldwide attention for an article he wrote criticising the newly elected President of Taiwan, Tsai Ing-wen, whom he described as being "extreme" and "emotional" as a result of her unmarried status.

== Claims ==
Wang's article was published on Tuesday 24 May 2016, in the International Herald Leader, a newspaper affiliated with the state news agency Xinhua. He wrote that Tsai was "extreme" in her politics, being an unmarried woman lacking the "emotional balance provided by romantic and family life". He also claimed that Tsai was likely to "hold radical views that could encourage her to seek formal independence from China because she was unmarried and had no children". Wang expressed the view that China's policy regarding Taiwan should be "framed according to these concerns".

In the article, Wang also criticised Tsai's family history, claiming that the Tsai family was "well connected to the Japanese invaders" during the Second World War. The Xinhua article also claimed that Tsai focuses too much on short-term goals, not broader strategic matters.

Wang holds the rank of Major General in the PLA, and has previously written that building political trust is the key for relations between Taiwan and mainland China. Tsai was sworn in as Taiwan's first female president on 20 May 2016, and has been criticised by officials in China for refusing to explicitly endorse the so-called "one-China" principle.

== Response ==
In Taiwan, both politicians and the general public expressed anger about the remarks, although Tsai's office declined to comment. DPP Legislator Yeh Yi-jin (葉宜津) said that it "displays discrimination against single people". Alicia Wang (王育敏) of the Chinese Nationalist Party (KMT) was equally incensed over the comments. The Mayor of the southern city of Kaohsiung, Chen Chu, said that remaining single is a life choice, and that "it has nothing to do with one's stance, abilities or professionalism".

In a satirical commentary, Anne Henochowicz of China Digital Times diagnosed Wang Weixing as suffering from "straight man cancer", or outspoken misogyny. While Daniel J. Bauer of the China Post described it as disrespectful to the 23 million people who live in Taiwan.

The article was widely criticised, and later removed from the International Herald Leader's website, and other mainland news portals.
