= Under One Person =

Chinese webcomic by Dong Man Tang and Mi Er

一人之下 Yi Ren Zhi Xia
- Genre: Fantasy, action, comedy
- Author: Dong Man Tang
- Illustrator: Mi Er
- Publisher: ac.qq.com (China Tencent)
- Original run: February 26, 2015 – present
- Anime television series

Hitori no Shita: The Outcast
- Directed by: Xin Wang
- Written by: Mitsuo Mori
- Music by: Ryuudai Abe; Shouko Mochiyama
- Studio: Emon; Pandanium
- Licensed by: Crunchyroll
- Original network: Tokyo MX, Tencent, bilibili
- Original run: July 9, 2016 – September 24, 2016
- Episodes: 12
- Anime television series

Hitori no Shita: The Outcast 2
- Directed by: Ye Chen
- Music by: Wen Fang
- Studio: Haoliners Animation League
- Licensed by: Crunchyroll
- Original network: Tokyo MX, Tencent, bilibili
- Original run: October 27, 2017 – May 18, 2018
- Episodes: 24
- Anime television series

Hitori no Shita: The Outcast 3
- Directed by: Tian Xing Wei
- Music by: Niang Xiao
- Studio: Big Firebird
- Original network: Tencent
- Original run: April 24, 2020 – May 8, 2020
- Episodes: 8
- Anime television series

Hitori no Shita: The Outcast 4
- Directed by: Ye Chen
- Studio: Qiyuan Yinghua
- Original network: Tencent
- Original run: September 24, 2021 – December 3, 2021
- Episodes: 12
- Anime television series

Hitori no Shita: The Outcast 5
- Directed by: Ye Chen
- Studio: Qiyuan Yinghua
- Original network: Tencent
- Original run: December 09, 2022 – February 24, 2023
- Episodes: 12

Under One Person (Chinese: 一人之下; pinyin: Yi Ren Zhi Xia; lit. 'Under One Person') with subtitle The Outcast is a Chinese webcomic by Dong Man Tang (Chinese: 动漫堂), illustrated by Mi Er (Chinese: 米二), and published by Tencent. It was first published under the title 异人 (Yi Ren, literally: "Weirdo") and with subtitle King of the Weirdo in February 2015.

A collaboration Chinese/Japanese anime television series adaptation titled Hitori no Shita: The Outcast (一人之下 The Outcast) aired from July 9 to September 24, 2016. A second season aired from January 16 to June 26, 2018, and simulcast in Chinese and Japanese.

The comic has been adapted into a movie titled The Traveller which premiered in 2024 and live-action drama titled I Am Nobody which premiered in 2023. An animated film The Outcast: The Bloody Battle of Mian is announced and scheduled to be released in 2027.

== Plot ==
Chou Soran was a normal college student until he gets caught up in a terrible incident in a small village while visiting his grandfather's grave. While walking through the graveyard to pay visit to his deceased grandfather, Soran is assaulted by zombies until a mysterious girl wielding a knife appears and leads him to a confrontation with the zombies. After successfully fending off the zombies and further encounters with the knife wielding girl known as Fu Hōhō, Soran's life begins to change as he learns that the martial arts technique taught to him by his grandfather, known as Kitaigen, is a technique being sought after by many martial arts groups with ulterior motives. The story follows Soran's attempt to find out his grandfather's real history and his supposed connection with Fu Hōhō.

== Characters ==
Zhang Chulan / Chō Soran (张楚岚)
Voiced by: Atsushi Tamaru, Yuko Iida (child)
A college student and the inheritor of Kitaigen – a powerful martial arts technique that utilizes Qi. After finding out that his grandfather is much more than what he is led to believe, he begins to unravel his grandfather's true history with Fū Hōhō as his only lead. Unbeknownst to him, he is also an Outsider that has acquired his status after being trained by his grandfather.
Feng Baobao / Fū Hōhō (冯宝宝)
Voiced by: Saori Hayami
A young-looking girl with a mysterious past who works for Express Delivery Company and is also an Outsider. She is an adept fighter although without any formal martial arts training. She wields a knife that she usually hides and only uses it in case of serious situations. It is hinted that Fū Hōhō is connected to Soran's grandfather and may be the key to unraveling the mysteries surrounding her past and Soran's grandfather and that she might've been alive for more than a century while still retaining her youthful appearance.
Xu San / Jo San (徐三)
Voiced by: Kenji Nojima
A high-ranking employee of 'Express Delivery Company' – a front company sponsored by the fictional Chinese state government that employs 'Outsiders' to harbor them and prevent Outsiders from causing disruptions in society. 'Outsiders' are people with the ability to control and manifest their Qi to perform superhuman and psychic feats achieved through rigorous martial arts training or being inherently born with the ability to control their Qi. Jo San is also an Outsider with the psychic ability to control objects.
Xu Si / Jo Yon (徐四)
Voiced by: Shinnosuke Tachibana
Jo San's brother and another employee of Express Delivery Company with more or less equal status to Jo San.
Tuhouzi / Saru (猿)
Voiced by: Kappei Yamaguchi
An employee of Express Delivery Company. He is an Outsider that uses his Qi to burrow underground and use tunnels to move quickly from one place to another.
Liu Yanyan / Ryu Kenken (柳妍妍)
Voiced by: Ayaka Asai
A girl who attempted to kidnap Chō Soran to prove worthy of joining Zensei – a mysterious organization of Outsiders with nefarious motives and considered to be a formidable force in the world of Outsiders. She is also an Outsider with the ability to control deceased humans and turn them into zombies that she can control.
Zhang Xilin / Chō Shakurin (张锡林)
Voiced by: Tadashi Miyazawa
Chō Soran's grandfather has mysterious connections to Zensei, Fū Hōhō, and Tenshifu – an ancient martial arts organization that harbors outsiders and the most influential organization in the world of Outsiders. He is the progenitor of the Kitaigen technique – a technique that involves utilizing Qi to perform superhuman feats.
Zhang Yude / Chō Yotoku (张予德)
Voiced by: Kanehira Yamamoto
Xia He / Natsuka (夏禾)
Voiced by: Yoko Hikasa
Lu Liang / Ro Ryo (吕良)
Voiced by: Marie Miyake
Feng Shayan / Fuusaen (风沙燕)
Voiced by: Yumi Hara
Zhang Lingyu / Chō Reiyu (张灵玉)
Voiced by: Kousuke Toriumi
Wang Ye (王也)
Voiced by: Kazuyuki Okitsu
Zhuge Qing (诸葛青)
Voiced by: Daisuke Hirakawa
Zhuge Bai (诸葛白)
Voiced by: Yukiko Morishita
Jia Zhengliang (贾正亮)
Voiced by: Kenji Akabane
Feng Xingtong (风星潼)
Voiced by: Kengo Kawanishi
Ma Xianhong (马仙洪)
Lu Linglong (陆玲珑)
Voiced by: Yūka Amemiya
Zhi Jinhua (枳瑾花)

== Anime ==
An anime adaptation, titled Hitori no Shita: The Outcast (一人之下 The Outcast), was produced by Haoliners Animation League's Japanese branch Emon, directed by Wang Xin with assistant directors Kazuhiro Toda and Mitsuo Mori, and animated by Pandanium. Season 2 was produced and animated by Haoliners themselves while season 3 was animated by Big Firebird and seasons 4 and 5 were animated by Qiyuan Yinghua. Tokyo MX broadcast a special "episode 0" on July 2 and the first episode aired on July 9. An English-subtitled version premiered on Crunchyroll on July 9. The opening theme is "ARCADIA" by Lilith while the ending theme is "In the Dawn" by Affective Synergy. Crunchyroll streamed the second season. A sixth season has been announced.

=== Episode list ===
==== Season 1 ====
No.	Title	Original release date
1	"The Zhang Family's Secret?" "Chō Ya no Himitsu?" (張家の秘密?)	July 9, 2016
After the grave of Chou Shakurin is violated, a girl named Houhou appears claiming to be the granddaughter. Meanwhile, Chou's grandson, Soran, arrives from the college and is informed about the violation and about his alleged sister. At night, Soran finds Houhou digging up a grave, but is knocked out by her. When he wakes up, she is killing zombies and denies being his sister. She eventually abandons him among the zombies and meets her partner, Jo San; they see a lightning and return to see if Soran is well. They find the zombies electrocuted but not Soran. In the next day, Houhou goes to the same college Soran attends and meets him. In a brief sequence, a pair is shown interested in Chou Shakurin's corpse, as Houhou and Jo San are also revealed to be.
2	"Master and Servant" "Shujin to Geboku" (主人と下僕)	July 16, 2016
After a class, Houhou defies Soran to show his powers by attacking him. Soran is reluctant because his grandfather said he should avoid using it, and his father, Yotoku, beat him every time he used it. Soran realizes Houhou is one of the "outsiders" his grandfather allowed him to use his powers against. However, he is defeated by Houhou, who says he will be a servant to her from now on. Meanwhile, the zombie master who took Shakurin's corpse delivers it to the young boy-like Ro Ryou and the beautiful Natsuka. As Shakurin's body is of no use, Ro Ryou does not allow the zombie master to join the organization but promises to do so if they capture Shakurin's grandson.
3	"Lie" "Uso" (嘘)	July 23, 2016
Soran disobeys Houhou's order to meet her as he receives a date invitation from a girl. After a dinner they go to her apartment, where she blocks Soran's powers and reveals to be the zombie master who dug Shakurin's grave. She brings Soran to Ro Ryou and Natsuka and is accepted as a Zensei member. When Ro Ryou is trying to use his power to get information, Houhou and Jo San arrives.
4	"Chaos" "Konton" (混沌)	July 30, 2016
During the clash, Soran remembers his grandfather said that after bad things happen, good things happen too. However, he does not observe it even when Houhou and Jo San rescue him. As reinforcement arrives, Natsuka departs on a motorcycle, and Ro Ryou and the zombie master, Kenken, go away on a car. In a forest, Ro Ryou abandons Kenken, who is the only of the three to be captured. In the following day, Houhou brings Soran to meet the place where she and Jo San work—an express delivery system.
5	"Welcome to Express Delivery" "Youkoso Sokutatsu e" (ようこそ速達へ)	August 6, 2016
6	"Thunder God" "Raijin" (雷神)	August 13, 2016
7	"Soran's Feelings" "Soran no Omoi" (楚嵐の想い)	August 20, 2016
8	"Infiltration" "Sen'nyū" (潜入)	August 27, 2016
9	"Secret Arts" "Hijutsu" (秘術)	September 3, 2016
10	"Houhou" "Hōhō" (宝宝)	September 10, 2016
11	"1944" "Ichi Kyū Shi Shi" (一九四四)	September 17, 2016
12	"To the Future" "Mirai e" (未来へ)	September 24, 2016

==== Season 2 ====
No.	Title	Original release date
1	"Raten Taishou" "Raten Taishō" (羅天大醮)	January 16, 2018
2	"Ryuukozan" "Ryūkozan" (龍虎山)	January 23, 2018
3	"Shameless" (厚顔無恥)	January 30, 2018
4	"32 Men" "San-jū-ni-nin" (三十二人)	February 6, 2018
5	"Kitaigen Style" "Kitaigen Ryū" (炁体源流)	February 13, 2018
6	"Bait" "Esa" (餌)	February 20, 2018
7	"36 Rebels" "San-jū-roku-zoku" (三十六賊)	February 27, 2018
8	"Nouyou Insou" "Nōyō Insō" (能鷹隠爪)	March 6, 2018
9	"Qimen Kenzou Shinpou" "Kimon Kenzō Shinpō" (奇門顕像心法)	March 13, 2018
10	"Fuukou Qimen" "Fūkō Kimon" (風后奇門)	March 20, 2018
11	"Sutra of Purity" "Seiseikei" (清静経)	March 27, 2018
12	"An Old Enemy" "Shukuteki" (宿敵)	April 3, 2018
13	"Kourei Kenshou" "Kōrei Kenshō" (拘霊遣将)	April 10, 2018
14	"Suizourai" "Suizōrai" (水臓雷)	April 17, 2018
15	"Dauntless" "Daitan Futeki" (大胆不敵)	April 24, 2018
16	"Exorcism" "Yakubarai" (厄払)	May 1, 2018
17	"Way of the Tenshi" "Tenshi-hō" (天師法)	May 8, 2018
18	"Impaction" "Maifuku" (埋伏)	May 15, 2018
19	"Juuni Roujoujin" "Jū-ni Rōjōjin" (十二労情陣)	May 22, 2018
20	"Intent to Kill" "Satsui" (殺意)	May 29, 2018
21	"Miracle" "Kiseki" (奇跡)	June 5, 2018
22	"Master" "Tōshu" (当主)	June 12, 2018
23	"Repose" "Ansoku" (安息)	June 19, 2018
24	"Beijing" "Pekin" (北京)	June 26, 2018
