= Hong Kong Comics: A History of Manhua =

Book by Wendy Siuyi Wong

- Author: Wendy Siuyi Wong
- Language: English
- Genre: Informational
- Publisher: Princeton Architectural Press NY
- Publication date: April 1, 2002 (1st Edition)
- Publication place: Hong Kong
- Media type: Print (Paperback)
- Pages: 188 p. (1st Edition)
- ISBN: 1-56898-269-0
- OCLC: 45841483
- Dewey Decimal: 741.5/095125 21
- LC Class: PN6790.C4 W66 2002

Hong Kong Comics: A History of Manhua is a reference book on Hong Kong comics. It was authored by Wendy Siuyi Wong, and released in 2002.

== Content ==
The book covers the origin of Manhua from the very first generation of comic books in China, to Hong Kong and some information on manga adaptations. It includes a complete listing of books up to the year 2000 with descriptions and images of every comic. It is the definitive source for English-speaking audiences with appendices of Chinese translations in the back. As many as 800 rare illustrations of comics are in the book.

The title was originally published in Chinese for a Hong Kong audience. The original coauthor of the Chinese version was Yueng Wai-pong, who spent a lifetime collecting and studying the art. Funding was later provided by the Hong Kong Arts Development Council.

== Significance ==
The products of the Chinese comics industry have been almost exclusively available to the Far East. This book helps close the gap between Eastern and Western audiences. Unlike manga, which have been thoroughly translated by numerous references, this is one of the few books that is able to provide insight for the West in a detailed manner.

== See also ==
- Lianhuanhua
