= Kuang Biao =

Political cartoonist

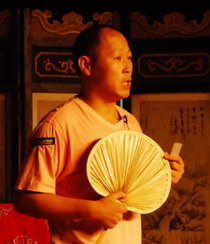
- Kuang in 2010

Chinese name
- Simplified Chinese: 邝飚
- Traditional Chinese: 鄺飈
- Hanyu Pinyin: Kuàng Biāo

Kuang Biao (邝飚) is an influential Chinese political cartoonist and microblogger. He has worked at the Southern Metropolis Daily as its Cartoon Editor, and his work has been published in China Digital Times and the once-popular weekly Chinese newspaper Satire and Humor. Kuang says his cartoons mainly satirize official policy pronouncements and the misbehaviour of Communist party officials.

== Censorship ==
Fury Wave by Kuang Biao

He is one of several commentators who have had their online Weibo microblogging accounts shut down in an attempt at censorship by the Chinese Communist Party. He states that he has had his Weibo account shut down "dozens of times", but according to Xinhua, users of such accounts will subject to intensified online management, and would not be allowed to register again under another name. Previously, Kuang Biao had been including his 'reincarnation count' each time he re-registered for Weibo. For example, in May 2015, his username was 'Uncle Biao Fountain Pen Drawings 47', or Kuangshugangbihua47.

== Activism ==
Kuang has created artworks in response to many subjects considered sensitive by authorities in China, such as the tainted milk scandal and the activities of dissidents such as Chen Guangcheng.

He was demoted by Southern Metropolis daily after depicting a journalist, Chang Ping in a stranglehold, after Chang had been barred from writing for two newspapers due to controversy over his article Tibet: Nationalist Sentiment and the Truth.

In 2013, he created a cartoon condemning the execution of street vendor Xia Junfeng who had been charged with murder, after claiming self-defence during an attack by chengguan, or urban law enforcement officers. In 2015, Kuang was one of three Chinese cartoonists who created works expressing displeasure at the French comic magazine Fluide Glacial, for its portrayal of the Chinese people. In February 2020, he portrayed Li Wenliang, the Wuhan physician who warned about and died in the COVID-19 outbreak.

David Bandurski, a researcher with the University of Hong Kong, says the internet has dramatically changed the environment for Chinese political cartoonists, who now have a good platform to find an audience.
