= Manhua =

Chinese-language comics

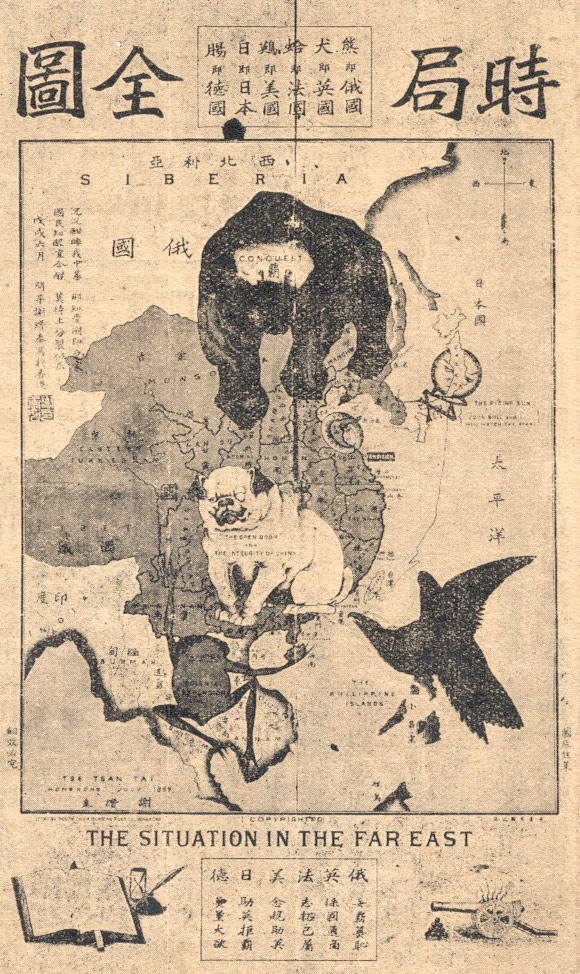
- The Situation in the Far East, an 1899 manhua by Tse Tsan-tai
- Publishers: Tong Li Comics, Ever Glory Publishing, Sharp Point Publishing, Jonesky, Chuang Yi, Kuaikan, ManMan, QQ Comic, Vcomic, U17, Dongman Manhua, dmzj.com, Comico Taiwan, Line Webtoon
- Series: List
- Languages: Chinese (written in Traditional Chinese or Simplified Chinese)

Related articles

Manhua
- Traditional Chinese: 漫畫
- Simplified Chinese: 漫画
Transcriptions
Standard Mandarin
- Hanyu Pinyin: mànhuà
- Wade–Giles: man4-hua4
Yue: Cantonese
- Jyutping: maan6 waa6*2

Manhua (simplified Chinese: 漫画; traditional Chinese: 漫畫; pinyin: mànhuà) are Chinese-language comics produced in Greater China. Chinese comics and narrated illustrations have existed in China throughout its history.

They are usually graphic and can be written for a myriad of genres, including romance, fantasy, historical, thrillers, paranormal, and horror. The narratives are varied but often include tropes and plots common to Asian culture and settings.

The first major manhua magazine, Shanghai Sketch, first published in 1928. During the early 20th century, political manhua were printed as propaganda during times of political upheaval. At the start of the 21st century, Chinese cartoonists began to publish manhua through social media and microblogging websites.

== Etymology ==
The word manhua was originally an 18th-century term used in Chinese literati painting. It became popular in Japan as manga in the late 19th century. Feng Zikai reintroduced the word to Chinese, in the modern sense, with his 1925 series of political cartoons entitled Zikai Manhua in the Wenxue Zhoubao (Literature Weekly). While terms other than manhua had existed before, this particular publication took precedence over the many other descriptions for cartoon art that were used previously and manhua came to be associated with all Chinese comic materials.

The Chinese characters for manhua are identical to those used for the Japanese manga and Korean manhwa. Someone who draws or writes manhua is referred to as a manhuajia (traditional Chinese: 漫畫家; simplified Chinese: 漫画家; pinyin: mànhuàjiā).

== History ==
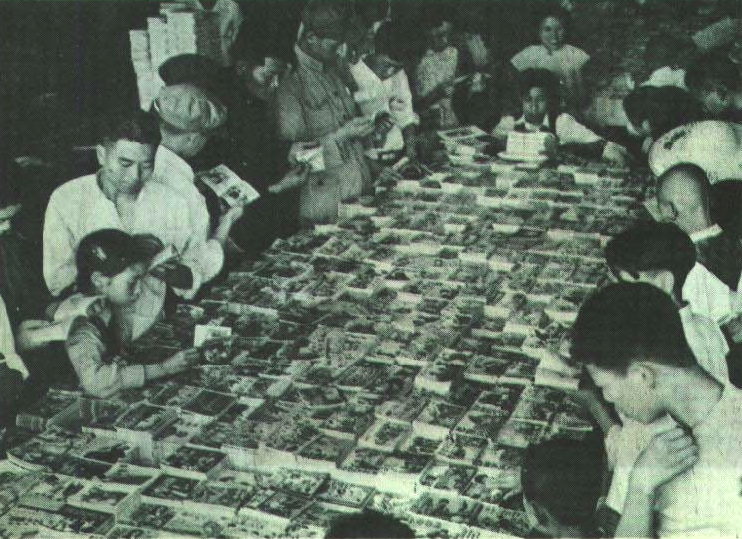
People in Shanghai reading and buying lianhuanhua, 1951

The oldest surviving examples of Chinese drawings are stone reliefs from the 11th century BC and pottery from 5000 to 3000 BC. Many reliefs, such as those from the Wu Family Shrines of the Han dynasty, detail historical events using sequential storytelling. Other examples include symbolic brush drawings from the Ming Dynasty, a satirical drawing titled "Peacocks" by the early Qing Dynasty artist Zhu Da, and a work called "Ghosts' Farce Pictures" from around 1771 by Luo Liang-feng. Chinese manhua was born in the late 19th and early 20th centuries, roughly during the years 1867 to 1927.

The introduction of lithographic printing methods derived from the West was a critical step in expanding the art in the early 20th century. Beginning in the 1870s, satirical drawings appeared in newspapers and periodicals. By the 1920s palm-sized picture books like Lianhuanhua were popular in Shanghai. They are considered the predecessor of modern-day manhua.

One of the first magazines of satirical cartoons came from the United Kingdom entitled The China Punch. The first piece drawn by a person of Chinese nationality was The Situation in the Far East from Tse Tsan-tai in 1899, printed in Japan. Sun Yat-Sen established the Republic of China in 1911 using Hong Kong's manhua to circulate anti-Qing propaganda. Some of the manhua that mirrored the early struggles of the transitional political and war periods were The True Record and Renjian Pictorial.

Up until the establishment of the Shanghai Sketch Society in 1927, all prior works were Lianhuanhua or loose collections of materials. The first successful manhua magazine, Shanghai Sketch (or Shanghai Manhua) appeared in 1928. Between 1934 and 1937 about 17 manhua magazines were published in Shanghai. In the 1920s and 1930s, newspapers also began publishing cartoon sections.

The 1935 anthology Personal Essays and Cartoons, commissioned by the literary journal Venus and edited by Chen Wangdao, was a major milestone in the art form's development and respectability.

This format was used as a form for propaganda with the outbreak of the Second Sino-Japanese War. By the time the Japanese occupied Hong Kong in 1941, all manhua activities had stopped. With the surrender of the Japanese in 1945, political mayhem between Chinese Nationalists and Communists took place. One of the critical manhua, This Is a Cartoon Era by Renjian Huahui made note of the political backdrop at the time.

One of the most popular and enduring comics of this period was Zhang Leping's Sanmao, first published in 1935.

During the Second Sino-Japanese War, begun in 1937, many Chinese cartoonists, including Ye Qianyu, fled Shanghai and other major cities and waged "cartoon guerilla warfare" against the Japanese invaders by mounting roving cartoon exhibitions and publishing cartoon magazines in inland cities like Hankou.

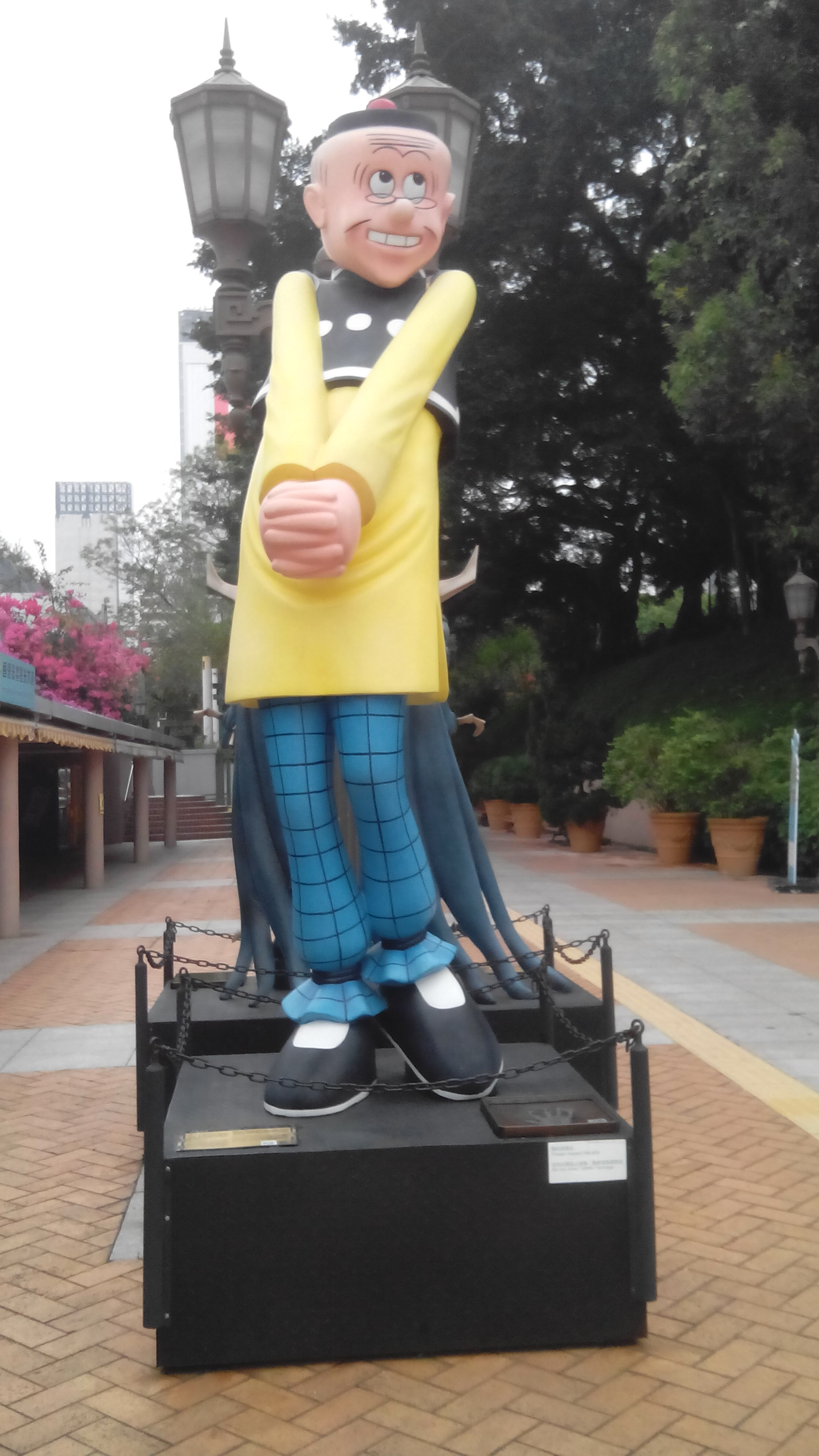
Old Master Q, one of the earliest popular manhua characters from Hong Kong

The rise of Chinese immigration turned Hong Kong into the main manhua-ready market, especially with the baby boom generation of children. The most influential manhua magazine for adults was the 1956 Cartoons World, which fueled the best-selling Uncle Choi. The availability of Japanese and Taiwanese comics challenged the local industry, selling at a pirated bargain price of 10 cents. Manhua-like Old Master Q were needed to revitalize the local industry.

The arrival of television in the 1970s was a changing point. Bruce Lee's films dominated the era and his popularity launched a new wave of Kung Fu manhua. The explicit violence helped sell comic books, and the Government of Hong Kong intervened with the Indecent Publication Law in 1975. Little Rascals was one of the pieces which absorbed all the social changes. The materials would also bloom in the 90s with work like McMug and three-part stories like "Teddy Boy", "Portland Street" and "Red Light District".

Since the 1950s, Hong Kong's manhua market has been separate from that of mainland China.

Si loin et si proche, by Chinese writer and illustrator Xiao Bai, won the Gold Award at the 4th International Manga Award in 2011. Several other manhua have also won the Silver and Bronze Awards at the International Manga Award.

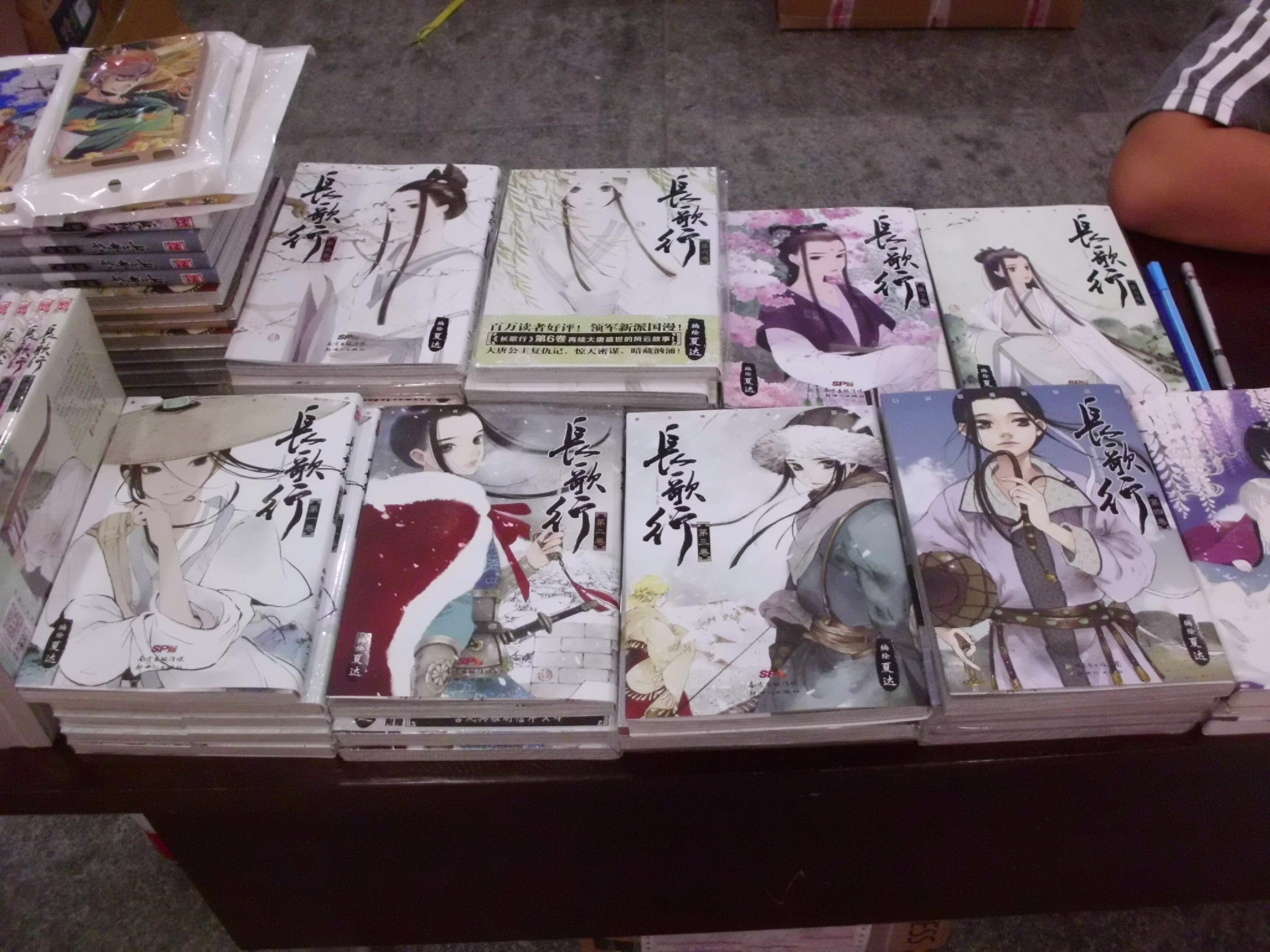
Volumes of Chang Ge Xing, or the Long Ballad, first published in popular Chinese comics magazine Comicsfan Culture (漫友文化)

In the second half of the 2000s and early 2010s, various Chinese cartoonists began using social media to spread satirical strips and cartoons online. Print publishing, being strictly controlled in China, is slowly being traded in for microblogging websites such as Sina Weibo and Douban, where manhua can reach a wide audience while subject to less editorial control.

Despite China being a major consumer of comics for decades, the medium has never been taken as "serious works of art". R. Martin of The Comics Journal describes the Chinese outlook on comics as "pulpy imitations of films". Furthermore, China strictly controls the publishing of comics, and as a result, cartoonists faced difficulty reaching a large audience. Many cartoonists in the late 2000s began self-publishing their work on social media instead of attempting to issue paper editions. Websites such as Douban (2005) and Sina Weibo (2009) are popular venues for web manhua and webcomics.

The Taipei International Comics and Animation Festival celebrated the coming of a "webcomics era" in 2015. With increased smartphone usage with a younger generation, web manhua, webcomics, and webtoons are expected to become more popular. With an increasing prevalence of Chinese-language online comic platforms, young artists have more opportunities to publish their work and gain a reputation. In the second half of the 2010s, South Korean webtoons and webtoon platforms have become increasingly popular in China. In 2016, two manhua have been adapted into anime television series: Yi Ren Zhi Xia and Soul Buster. Another series, Bloodivores, based on a web manhua, will start airing on October 1, 2016. Another series, The Silver Guardian, premiered in the Spring 2017 season. Two years later, Ultramarine Magmell, another Chinese manhua, got an anime in 2019.

=== Taiwanese manhua ===
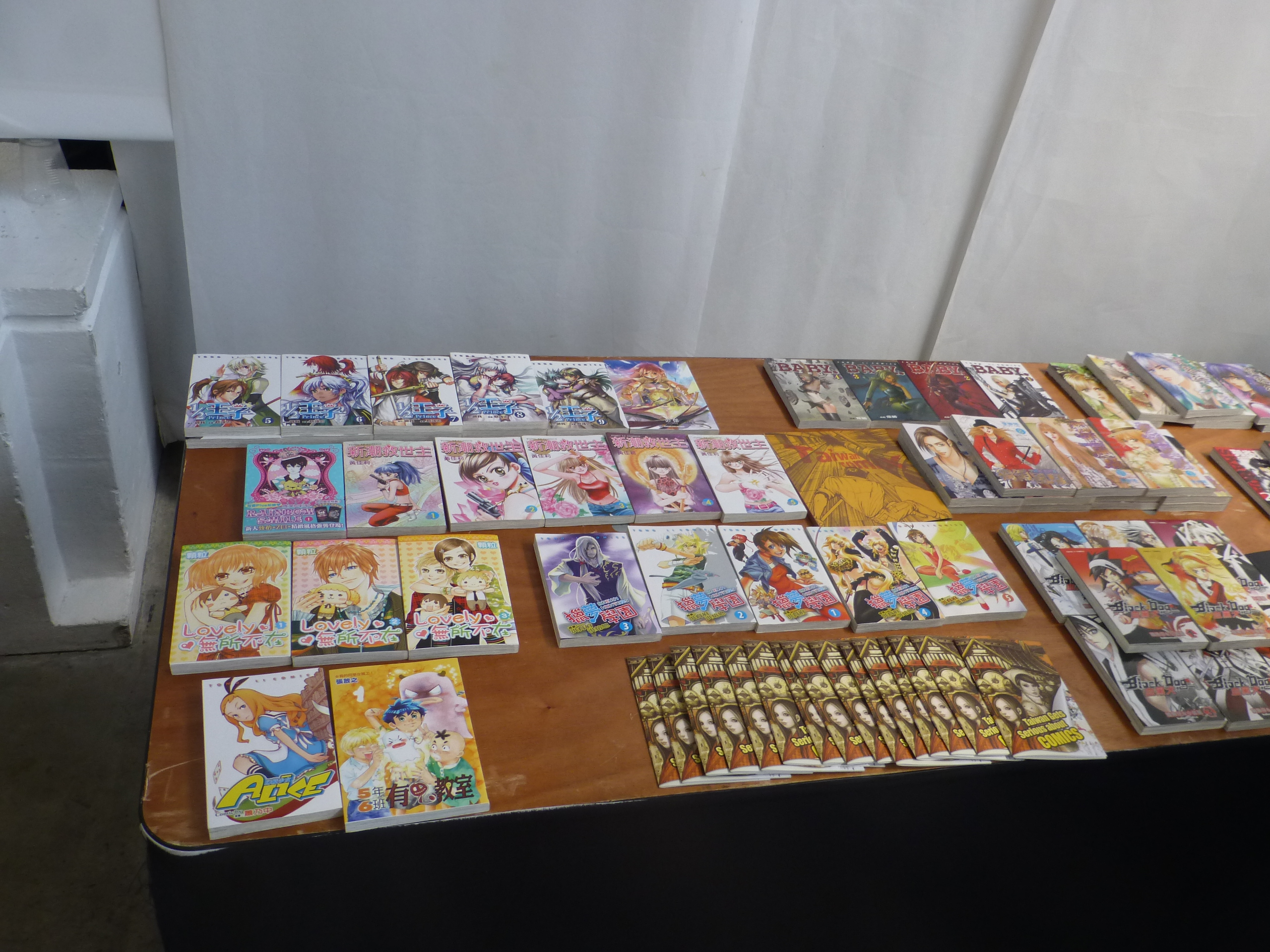
Various Taiwanese manhua at a comics event in Copenhagen, 2015

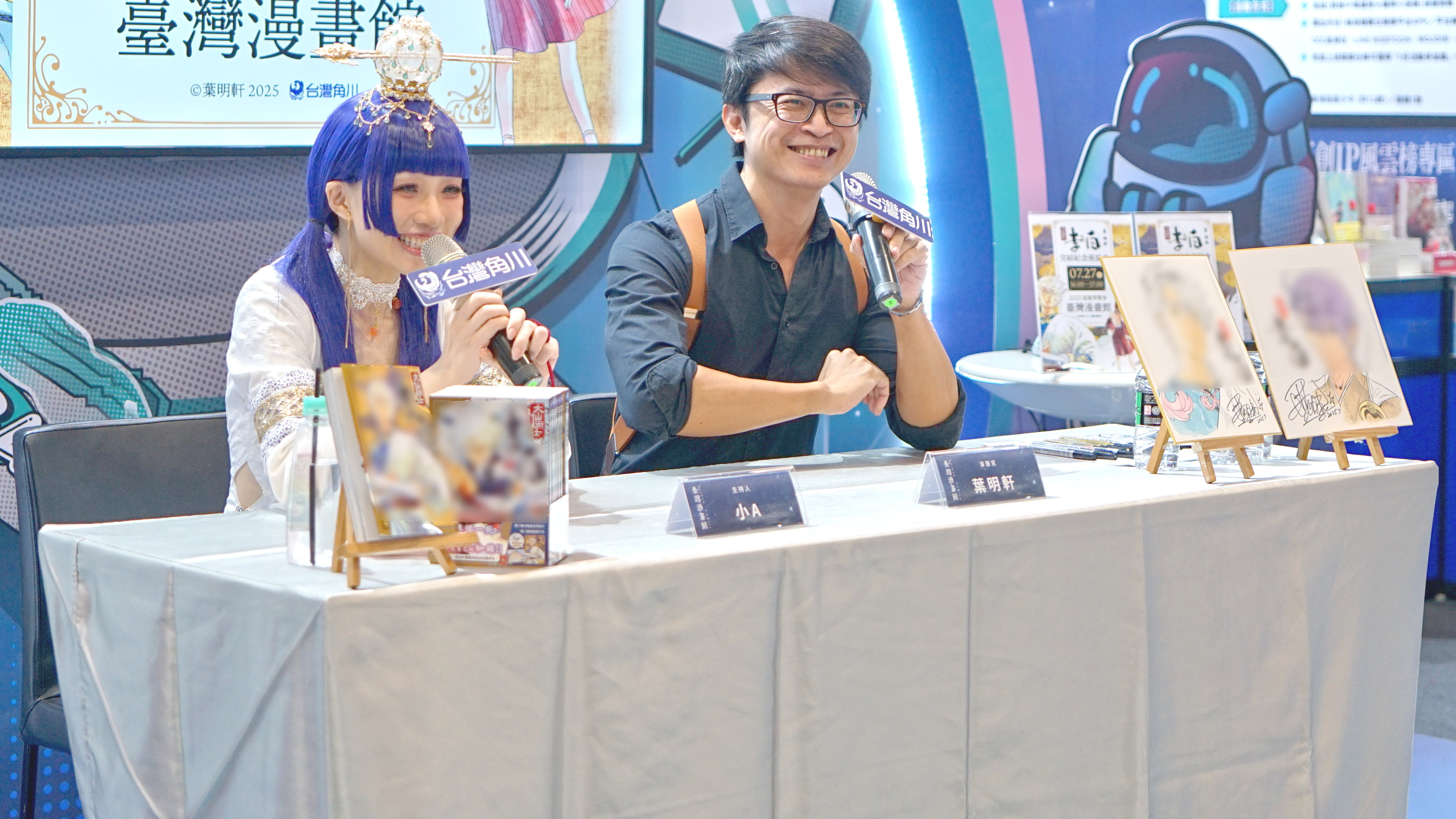
Manhua artist Yeh Ming-Hsuan (right) being interviewed at TAICCA Taiwan Comics event

Taiwanese manhua has its origins during the Japanese colonial period (1895-1945), when Taiwan was under Japanese rule. Prior to this, Taiwan produced publications combining text and images, such as illustrated novels. In the early 20th century, influenced by Japan, the first comic-style magazines appeared in Taiwan, including Taiwan Puck (1911), Tetsuwan Puck (1912), and Takasago Puck (1916), inspired by Japanese publications.

During the Japanese occupation, interest in comics grew, and publications began to include colored cartoons and satirical works. In 1921, the Taiwan Daily News began publishing a comic section, which became an important source of content for the local population.

After World War II, the influx of Chinese Lianhuanhua and American comics like Blondie and Dennis the Menace, along with the piracy of Japanese manga, helped solidify the popularity of comics in Taiwan. In the following decades, especially after the island's democratization in the 1990s, manhua gained recognition as a legitimate form of artistic and cultural expression.

== Categories ==
Before the official terminology was established, the art form was known by several names.

English	Pinyin	Chinese (traditional/simplified)
Allegorical Pictures	Rúyì Huà	如意畫 / 如意画
Satirical Pictures	Fĕngcì Huà	諷刺畫 / 讽刺画
Political Pictures	Zhèngzhì Huà	政治畫 / 政治画
Current Pictures	Shíshì Huà	時事畫 / 时事画
Reporting Pictures	Bàodǎo Huà	報導畫 / 报导画
Recording Pictures	Jìlù Huà	紀錄畫 / 纪录画
Amusement Pictures	Huáji Huà	滑稽畫 / 滑稽画
Comedy Pictures	Xiào Huà	笑畫 / 笑画

Today's manhua are simply distinguished by four categories.

English
Satirical and political manhua
Comical manhua
Action manhua
Children's manhua

== Characteristics ==
Modern Chinese-style manhua characteristics is credited to the breakthrough art work of the 1982 Chinese Hero. Unlike manga, it had more realistic drawings with details resembling real people. Most manhua also comes in full color with some panels rendered entirely in painting for the single issue format. Most manhua work from the 1800s to the 1930s contained characters that appeared serious. The cultural openness in Hong Kong brought the translation of American Disney characters like Mickey Mouse and Pinocchio in the 1950s, demonstrating western influence in local work like Little Angeli in 1954. Both the influx of translated Japanese manga of the 1960s and televised anime in Hong Kong also made a significant impression.

== Differences in formatting ==
Depending on where they are created, manhua can have differences in the way they are formatted and presented. Besides the use of traditional and simplified Chinese characters, manhua may also need to be read differently depending on where they are from. Their original Chinese text is placed horizontally in manhua from mainland China and read from left-to-right (like Western comics and Korean manhwa), while Taiwanese and Hong Kongese manhua have the characters rendered vertically top-to-bottom and sentences are read from right-to-left (like Japanese manga).

These are due to differences in the style prescribed by the governments of China, Taiwan, and Hong Kong.

== Digital manhua ==
=== Web manhua ===
Digital manhua, known as web manhua, are a growing art form in China. Web manhua are posted on social media and web manhua portals, which serve as a lower bar of entry than the strictly controlled print publication outlets in the country. Though little money is currently made through online manhua in China, the medium has become popular due to ease of uploading and publishing titles, color publication, and free reading access. Some popular web manhua sites include QQ Comic and U17. In recent years, several Chinese web manhua have been adapted into animated series, with some in co-production with the Japanese animation industry.

=== Webcomics ===
As microblogging and webcomics were gaining popularity in China, the form was increasingly used for political activism and satire. Despite China being a major consumer of comics for decades, the medium has never been taken as "serious works of art". R. Martin of The Comics Journal describes the Chinese outlook on comics as "pulpy imitations of films". Furthermore, China strictly controls the publishing of comics, and as a result, cartoonists faced difficulty reaching a large audience. Many cartoonists in the late 2000s began self-publishing their work on social media instead of attempting to issue paper editions. Websites such as Douban (2005) and Sina Weibo (2009) are popular venues for webcomics. The Taipei International Comics and Animation Festival celebrated a coming "webcomics era" in 2015. With increased smartphone usage amongst a younger generation, webcomics featuring a scrollable infinite canvas are expected to become more popular. With an increasing prevalence of Chinese-language webcomic portals, young artists have more opportunities to publish their work and gain a reputation. In the second half of the 2010s, South Korean webcomics and webtoon platforms have become increasingly popular in China.

Cartoonists such as Kuang Biao and Rebel Pepper make use of the Internet to criticize the Communist Party and its leaders. Communist propaganda and figures such as Lei Feng are openly mocked on microblogs and in online cartoons, despite efforts of censorship by the Chinese government. David Bandurski, a researcher with the University of Hong Kong's China Media Project, stated that social media has "dramatically changed the environment for cartoonists [as] they now have a really good platform to find an audience." Chinese animator Pi San criticized internet companies and web portals for being "pretty cowardly" and "too sensitive", as they take on the role of first line of defense through self-censorship. Rebel Pepper's account on Sina Weibo, where he posts his satiral cartoons, had been deleted over 180 times by 2012.

Blogging websites such as Sina Weibo are also highly censored by the Chinese government. Reuters reported in September 2013 that about 150 graduates, all male, were employed to censor Sina Weibo day and night, and automatic censors processed around three million posts per day. A research team from Rice University, Texas, stated that they saw "a fairly sophisticated system, where human power is amplified by computer automation, capable of removing sensitive posts within minutes." Images censored from Sina Weibo include a portrait of Mao Zedong wearing a pollution mask, a photo compilation identifying the expensive watches on the wrists of supposedly low-waged local officials, and criticism on police action, censorship in education, and the one child policy.

=== Webtoons ===
Webtoons have grown in popularity in China as another form to consume and produce manhua in the country thanks in part to the popularity of South Korean webtoons. Microblogging platforms Sina Weibo and Tencent have also offered webtoons on their digital manhua sites alongside web-based manhua, several of which have been translated into various languages. While webtoon portals in mainland China are mainly run by big internet companies, webtoon portals in Taiwan are offered and operated by big webtoon publishers outside the country like Comico, and Naver (under the Line brand).

== Economics ==
Political cartoonist Liu "Big Corpse Brother" Jun had over 130,000 followers on Sina Weibo in December 2013, and Kuang Biao has his work appear both online and in various print journals.

The Taiwanese comics industry expects webcomics to prosper financially, though no accurate figures exist as of yet. Prize-winning cartoonists such as Chung Yun-de and Yeh Yu-tung were forced to turn to webcomics as their monthly income was too low to live from.

Beijing cartoonist Bu Er Miao sells her webcomic Electric Cat and Lightning Dog on Douban's eBook service for 1.99 CNY (roughly 0.30 USD). When asked about whether she makes a profit off of her webcomic, Miao described the 1.79 CNY she makes per comic sold as "an amount of money that if you saw it on the street, no one would bother to pick it up."

== Adaptations ==
The Chinese webcomic One Hundred Thousand Bad Jokes received a film adaptation of the same name released in 2014. In 2016, two anime series based on Chinese web manhua were broadcast: Hitori no Shita: The Outcast, based on Under One Person by Dong Man Tang and Bloodivores, based on a web manhua by Bai Xiao. A donghua series adaptation of a web manhua by Pingzi, Spiritpact, has been released in China. A Chinese-Japanese animated series based on Chōyū Sekai is scheduled to air in 2017. Another series, The Silver Guardian, based on The Silver Guardian, premiered in 2017. Chang Ge Xing, a live-action adaptation of the manhua of the same name by Xia Da, began filming in 2019.

The Taiwanese Manhua series Brave Series received an animated television series adaptation released in 2021. The first season received positive reviews, and won the Award of Best Animated Series on the 57th Golden Bell Awards. A second season was released in 2025.

Kakao, operating the Korean webtoon portal Daum Webtoon, has collaborated with the Chinese Huace Group in order to produce live-action, Chinese language films and television dramas based on South Korean webtoons.

== See also ==
- Ani-Com Hong Kong
- Chinese animation
- Chinese art
- Dongman
- Hong Kong comics
- Hong Kong Comics: A History of Manhua
- List of manhua
- List of manhua publishers
- Taiwanese animation
- Manga
- Manhwa
- Truyện tranh
- Visual novel
