= Aimée de Jongh =

Dutch cartoonist, animator, and illustrator

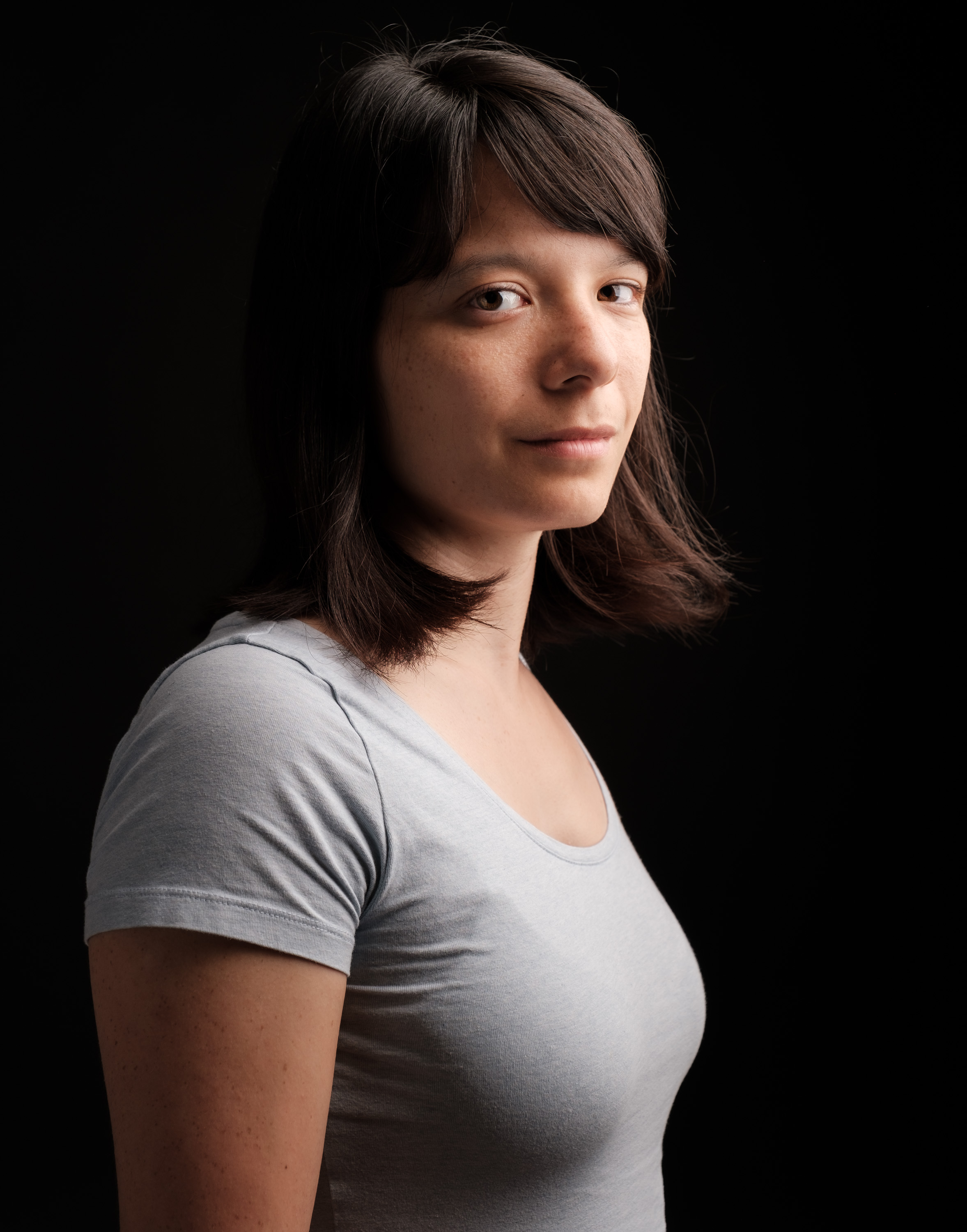
Aimee de Jongh.

Aimée de Jongh (born 1988, Waalwijk, Netherlands) is a Dutch graphic novelist and animator. She has been nominated for three Eisner Awards, winning her first in 2026 for her adaptation of Lord of the Flies, and has received a Prix Saint-Michel, Atomium Comic Strip Prize, and International Manga Award.

== Career ==
=== Comics and graphic novels ===
Early in her teens, de Jongh created manga-inspired small press comics with the Dutch collective Cheesecake! Studio. At the age of 17, she published her first comic book, Aimée TV. From 2012 until 2017, she created the daily comic strip Snippers for the Dutch newspaper Metro, which was collected in nine albums.

In 2014, she published her first graphic novel, De Terugkeer van de Wespendief (The Return of the Honey Buzzard), which won a Prix Saint-Michel and was adapted to a live-action film by Stanley Kolk. In 2018, she collaborated with Belgian writer Zidrou on the award-winning L'Obsolescence Programmée de Nos Sentiments (Blossoms in Autumn). In 2019, de Jongh created the autobiographical TAXI! for the Canadian publisher Conundrum Press. Her international breakthrough came in 2021, with the release of the bestselling graphic novel Jours de Sable (Days of Sand) by the French publishing house Dargaud. The Eisner-nominated book about the American Dust Bowl won numerous awards in Japan, the United States, Belgium, the Netherlands, and France. In 2022, de Jongh collaborated with French author Ingrid Chabbert on Soixante Printemps en Hiver (Sixty Years in Winter) for the Aire Libre Collection by publisher Dupuis, which was nominated for an Eisner Award. In September 2024, her graphic novel adaptation of William Golding's Lord of the Flies was published by Faber & Faber. It was shortlisted for the 2026 Carnegie Medal for Illustration.

=== Graphic journalism and short stories ===
De Jongh's career in graphic journalism started with a 25-page comic called Europe's Waiting Room about the refugee camps on the Greek island of Lesbos in 2017, for Dutch newspaper NRC. The comic was published online and as a booklet in Brazil by Conrad Editora as A Sala de Espera da Europa: Uma história de refugiados. In 2022, she drew a short story for the same newspaper about asylum seekers in Ter Apel, Netherlands. A short story about Ukrainian refugees in the Netherlands was published in 2023.

In 2022 she created a comic for the sci-fi magazine Métal Hurlant and in 2023 she collaborated with the Belgian writer Jean van Hamme on a short story which appeared for his book Miséricorde. She was asked to draw homages to the comic series Gaston and Les Tuniques Bleues for publishing house Dupuis.

=== Animation ===
De Jongh studied animation at the Willem de Kooning Academy in Rotterdam, the Royal Academy of Fine Arts (KASK) in Ghent, and the Gobelins Summer School in Paris. In 2014, she was artist in residence at 18th Street Arts Center in Los Angeles, where she created animations in collaboration with artist Miljohn Ruperto. One of the resulting art installations was shown at the Whitney Museum in New York City during the Whitney Biennial.

She directed and animated the short film Aurora, created storyboards for Hisko Hulsing's Amazon Prime series Undone, and animated a series of 12 music videos for the Dutch TV show De Wereld Draait Door. She created Behind the Telescopes, a 71-minute long theatrical film, in collaboration with harpist Lavinia Meijer and sound designer Arthur Antoine. In 2021, de Jongh created 6 animated short films for the Rijksmuseum's exhibition Slavery.

== Awards and honors ==
- Eisner Award winner for Best Adaptation from Another Medium (2026) for Lord of the Flies: The Graphic Novel
- Eisner Award nomination for Best Graphic Novel Reprint (2023) for Days of Sand
- Prix Atomium Cognito (2023)
- Prix Social'BD (2023)
- Eisner Award nomination for Best Digital Comic (2022) for Days of Sand
- The Guardian Best Graphic Novels selection (2022)
- Forbes Best Graphic Novels selection (2022)
- International Manga Award, Gold (2022)
- MoCCA Festival Award of Excellence (2022)
- Prix Bulles de Cristal 15-18-ans (2022)
- Prix BD d'Aventures SNCF (2022)
- Cutting Edge Award for Best One-Shot (2021)
- Stripschappenning Album of the Year (2021)
- Prix-Ouest-France Quai des Bulles (2021)
- Prix des Libraires Canal BD (2021)
- FNAC Stripprijs (2021)
- Prix BDstagram (2021)
- International Manga Award, Silver (2019)
- Rudolph Dirks Award for Romance (2019)
- Stripschap Album of the Year (2018)
- Prix Atomium de la BD Citoyenne (2018)
- Prix Saint-Michel for Best Dutch Comic Book (2014)
