= Zhang Xiaobai =

Chinese comics artist

- 张小白
- Born: December 19, 1982 (age 43); Anshan, Liaoning, China
- Education: Renmin University of China
- Occupation: Comics artist
- Years active: 2001–present
- Notable work: Si loin et si proche

Zhang Xiaobai (simplified Chinese: 张小白; traditional Chinese: 張小白; pinyin: Zhāng Xiǎobaí; born 19 December 1982) is a Chinese comics artist. She won the Gold Award at the 4th International Manga Award in 2011.

== Biography ==
Zhang was born in Anshan, Liaoning, China, on December 19, 1982. She graduated from Renmin University of China.

In 2006, her manhua, Hello, won the Best short Award at the 5th China Manhua Award.

In 2011, her manhua, Si loin et si proche, was awarded the Gold Award at the 4th International Manga Award.

== Work ==
- Hello (Chinese: 你好)
- Si loin et si proche
- Qinghua (Chinese: 青花)
- Luohuamengbi (Chinese: 落花梦笔)
- Space-Time Prisoner
