= Hollow Fields =

Manga series

- Cover of Hollow Fields vol. 1 (2007), art by Madeleine Rosca
- Genre: Action/adventure, steampunk
- Author: Madeleine Rosca
- Publisher: Seven Seas Entertainment (United States)
- Other publishers: (Finland) Egmont (Hungary) Vad Virágok Könyvműhely
- Original run: 2007–2016
- Volumes: 4

Hollow Fields is a steampunk-themed original English-language manga written and illustrated by Madeleine Rosca.

Volume 1 was released by Seven Seas Entertainment in June 2007, with a second volume released on May 29, 2008, and a third released on January 6, 2009. Volume 4- Titled Hollow Fields and the Perfect Cog released on March 29, 2016.

== Plot ==
Little Lucy Snow was meant to be enjoying her first day at the nice elementary school in town; however, a macabre twist of fate sees her enrolled instead at Miss Weaver's Academy for the Scientifically Gifted and Ethically Unfettered - also known as Hollow Fields. Located on the outskirts of Nullsville and run by the insidious Engineers, the grim boarding school dedicates itself to raising the next generation of mad scientists and evil geniuses. After enrolling in the school by mistake, she realizes how dangerous it was for her to register. At the end of every week, the student with the lowest grades gets sent to 'detention'. Once they are taken away, nobody ever sees the student again. Lucy must find a way to escape the school and escape detention.

== Characters ==
=== Students ===
Lucy Snow
Lucy Snow is a 9-and-a-half-year-old girl who accidentally gets enrolled at Hollow Fields. When she first arrived at the town she asked a stranger where she could find Saint Galbat's Academy for young ladies, where she was enrolled to go. After taking the strangers advice she went into the forest surrounding the town and went searching for her school. She comes across Hollow Fields by mistaking it as the Academy and enters the building to be confronted by Miss Notch, who tries to kill her. By insisting she was enrolled "at the school in town", Miss Notch thinks she is a new student and gives her a contract to sign. She signs it and becomes Hollow Fields property until next year's graduation. She is in the fifth grade and has a class rival called Summer Polanski. She also has acquires a "talking box" called Doctor Bleak. At the end of Volume 2, she saves Claude from falling, but is discovered by Miss Weaver and sent to detention with him.
Claude McGinty
Claude McGinty is a 10-year-old student also enrolled at Hollow Fields. He is a stern, standoffish guy who is a genius in all things mechanic, especially robots. He is trying to escape Hollow Fields with two of his other friends for unknown reasons. When Lucy Snow first encounters him, he is cold to her and calls her names, and shouts at her when she tried to talk to him. Lucy encounters him in the library late one night and asks to work with him to get out of Hollow Fields where he claims that "[Their] committee policy is no girls allowed", and later says that he makes the rules revealing that he has issues with girls. It is also revealed heavily by Miss Weaver that he once had a sister, who was sent to detention.
Summer Polanski
Summer Polanski is the smartest student at Hollow Fields. She is adored by the staff, and is very pretty. The author states that she is "The Most Popular Girl in School". She is crude to Lucy and no one wants to get on her "bad side". Her best friends are Francine and Carmen. She added a secret wing to the school that only she and her classmates (aside from Lucy and Claude) are aware of, where students study to one day take over Hollow Fields. She despises Claude because he is smarter than her in robotics. Mr. Croach opted for her and Carmen to be taken to the windmill instead of Claude and Lucy, however, Ms. Weaver overruled him. Croach, when looking for a person to transfer into due to his failing mechanical one, tried to use her, but he was stopped.
Simon Belljoy
Lucy's first friend. He is the first person Lucy sees to be taken to detention. He manages to escape two months later to tell Lucy something but is caught soon after. No one is able to see his face after that, but he wears a huge cloak and floats around. He is seen briefly in chapter eleven when he shows Lucy and Claude how to escape the windmill. His fate in unknown but it is suggested he was destroyed by the windmill children.
Francine Steinwald
Francine is friends with Summer and Carmen. She's the second child Lucy sees to be taken to detention. In chapter 11 her soul has been removed and put into a gear object similar to the one Doctor Bleak is in. In the same chapter, Miss Rickett's soul is put into her body through the Psychotransmigrator. It states that Francine is the first test subject that succeeded in Miss Weaver's experiment. It also states that she is Meg McGinty's friend.

=== Engineers ===
Miss Weaver
The head of the school, which she modified from its original estate mostly herself. She teaches Clockwork Robotics as a subject. She is extremely cold and cruel towards students, and is rarely ever threatened by anyone. It is revealed that all engineers were once human 80 years ago. However, she had an illness that was incurable, and as she was dying, she decided to give her and the rest of the staff mechanical bodies to extend their lifespan. Her husband, Doctor Bleak, was her first test subject whose soul was successfully transferred into a clockwork box. She announced the fact that her "experiment" worked, and she now needs more test subjects. She tells the students they did horribly on their mid-term tests, and changes to rule to two students being sent to the windmill each week. It was revealed that her full name is Eleanor Weaver.
Miss Notch
The school maid. She was the one who allowed Lucy to enter Hollow Fields, and let her sign a contract, becoming Hollow Field's property until graduation. She is cheerful and busy, but is rather dark and cruel when it comes to disciplining children. When she was human, she was the young and loyal maid of Miss Weaver, and used to question her more. It was revealed that her full name is Emily Notch.
Miss Ricketts
The youngest and kindest teacher, favored by students. She teaches Cross-Species Body-Part Transplantation and Bio-Steam Graphing, and is also the school nurse. Her office is the hospital wing. In volume two, it is revealed that she is the one who created steam-powered. bodies for the Engineers. They visit her weekly for check-ups, as they are falling apart. She is the first and only to transfer her soul into a child's body.
Mister Croach
The teacher of Grave Robbing, Live Taxidermy and Embalming. In other words, he creates any living creatures concerning dead flesh. He is strict and short-tempered, often rushing and frightening children. His full name is Archibald Croach Jr., and before joining Miss Weaver, he worked with his father at Croach and Croach Jr "Steam-Driven Solutions". He strongly dislikes children, and does not like to be in contact with other people. By the end of the series, his body is falling apart, so he tries to transfer his soul into Summer Polanski's body. This is foiled, however, by other students. He is bitter and resentful towards everyone, and his cynical streak has not earned him much love.
Stinch
He is the school warden, created by Miss Weaver to be the perfect watchdog. However, as Miss Weaver is weak with creating anything from things other than clockwork, he has limited knowledge. He does whatever he can to catch students doing something wrong, and drags them to detention. His real gender, age, and race are unknown to everyone; make pronouns are used by Engineers for convenience. Lucy described him as looking like "he lost a fight with a sewing machine". Stinch tends to do the bare minimum whenever possible, a fact well-known to Engineers and Dr. Bleak.

=== Others ===
Doctor Artemis/Atticus Normandy Bleak
He is called "Doctor Bleak" for short. He is a box with clockwork machinery inside, which Lucy smuggles around the school. He tutors Lucy on all her subjects and even gives her hints on how to escape the school. Doctor Bleak is held hostage after being discovered by Miss Weaver, and Lucy and Claude are sent to detention. When he was still human, Miss Weaver, who used to be his wife, used him as her first experiment subject by putting his soul into the box that he is right now. In the first volume, he says his name is Atticus Normandy Bleak, although Miss Weaver once called him Artemis. Hollow Fields is his estate, however Miss Weaver has since taken it over. He is untrusting of all of the children besides Lucy at first because of their parents, but eventually realizes that he is being unfair.

== Production ==
Madeleine Rosca wanted to write a story which could appeal to both children and adults and that featured "a female protagonist" and "a steampunk-influenced setting". The concept of the series "gradually evolved over several months". Children's books such as A Series of Unfortunate Events and Artemis Fowl, that combined "fantasy/horror themes with comedy and had a broad appeal" inspired Hollow Fields, though she noted some "manga and comic influences" in her overall work. Rosca enjoyed drawing Lucy and her "big range of expressions" as well as Miss Notch and her "prim mannerisms". She began the series in 2004 and by mid-2005, "had a cohesive version". She published Hollow Fields on the "online webmanga community" Wirepop in November 2005 and three days later, Seven Seas Entertainment offered to publish Hollow Fields in North America. Seven Seas Entertainment released the three volumes of Hollow Fields from July 2007 to January 2009, and reprinted the series in an omnibus collection (ISBN 978-1-934876-72-5) in October 2009.

=== Volume list ===
No.	English release date	English ISBN
01	July 2007	978-1-933164-24-3
02	May 2008	978-1-933164-75-5
03	January 2009	978-1-934876-35-0
04	March 2016	978-1-626921-02-3

== Reception ==
Hollow Fields was well received by critics. Ben Leary of Mania Entertainment called it "a good, clean, fun, and inventive read" with "cleanly organized" and "attractive" art. PopCultureShock's Katherine Dacey praised the art as "crisply appealing", which is "as good if not better than the artwork in many licensed series, employing the visual tropes of shonen manga to tell a story that would resonate equally with Frances Hodgson Burnett and Hayao Miyazaki fans"; however, Dacey also commented on the plot as "a bit derivative, borrowing elements from Lemony Snicket and Harry Potter not to mention Castle in the Sky and Steamboy" and wished for "a consistent tone" in the story. Holly Ellingwood of Active Anime described it as "a remarkable debut" and "a rich fantasy of fertile imagination that will appeal to fans of Harry Potter and Lemony Snicket’s Series of Unfortunate Events". Ellingwood also commended the "immersing style with a highly attractive quality" of the artwork. Aint It Cool News's Scott Green wrote "Hollow Fields serves as a welcome, boisterous counter-point to post-Potter magical school fiction" and noted that it "does not closely conform to prominent the features of manga, or for that matter, western comics."

About.com's Deb Aoki picked Hollow Fields as "2007's Best New OEL Manga", and Dacey listed it as an honourable mention in her list of the ten best global manga. Rosca was one of four winners presented with Japan’s first ever "International Manga Award" for her work on Hollow Fields.
