= Feel 100% =

1996 film

- Cover of Feel 100% vol. 15, art by Lau Wan Kit

百分百感覺
- Genre: Romance
- Author: Lau Wan Kit
- Publisher: Culturecom Comics (Hong Kong); Ever Glory Publishing (Taiwan)
- Original run: 1992–2007
- Volumes: 16

Feel 100% (Chinese: 百分百感覺) is a popular Hong Kong comic book series written by Lau Wan Kit (劉雲傑) and Yau Ching Yuen (游清源). Its popularity has resulted in various adaptations on film and television. To this date there are 4 movies and 1 TV series.

As this comic book is for a Cantonese audience, the dialogue is in the more vernacular written Cantonese, rather than the standard written Chinese.

The main characters are two male best friends, Jerry and Hui Lok (許樂), and their female friend, Cherie. The story revolves around their relationships with others, including Jenny and Kei Kei (琪琪), and each other.

On 26 August 2008, Feel 100% won the Second International Manga Awards. The comic is currently licensed in Hong Kong, Malaysia, Taiwan, Thailand, Korea, Indonesia, Italy, mainland China and the United Kingdom

== Feel 100% on film and television ==
The movies are characterized as being loosely based on the comics. As each film's story line is different, certain characters, including the main ones, may or may not appear in each film. Each film and series stands independent from the others.

The movies have appeared in the following order:

Feel 100% (1996)

This film launched the careers of several of its participants, notably director Joe Ma and actress Sammi Cheng. Both have become associated with Gen-X romantic comedies. Other actors appearing include Ekin Cheng and Gigi Leung.

Feel 100% ... Once More (1996)

This film's only common thread with the series is the title as even the characters have different names. However, the director and all the lead actors from the previous movie remained for this one. And it remained true to the spirit of Feel 100%, which is a Gen-X coming of age story.

Feel 100% II (2001)

Of note is the absence of the main character Cherie from this incarnation. Many of the actors in this film went on to appear in the following version, the TV series. They include Daniel Chan (陳曉東), Niki Chow (周麗淇), Miriam Yeung (楊千嬅), Joey Yung (容祖兒), and Eason Chan (陳奕迅).

Feel 100% TV Series (2002)

This version is the most developed due to the lengthier nature of TV series. (It ran as 20 episodes of about 48 minutes each, split into 2 seasons of 11 and 9 episodes, respectively.) This was a popular version as it contained many of the newest Hong Kong stars. Also, it makes many references to Hong Kong pop culture icons.

Cast
Daniel Chan
Rain Li
Alex Fong
Niki Chow
Ronald Cheng
Edwin Siu Episode 17 (Guest Star)
Cookies (Guest Star)
Edison Chen a Hip Hop Fan and a DJ mixer. (Guest Star)

Feel 100% 2003 (2003)

This incarnation is considered by some as the weakest. It is the first Feel 100% project without director Joe Ma attached to it. Starring Shawn Yue, Cyrus Wong and the Cookies, this film has been criticized as being hijacked by the Cookies. Indeed, all 9 of them show up in a variety of roles for this film.

== Feel 100% on stamps ==
Hong Kong Post issued a set of six stamps and two stamp sheetlets on 16 September 2021
