= Prema Jatukanyaprateep =

Thai cartoonist and animator

Prema Jatukanyaprateep (Thai: เปรมา จาตุกัญญาประทีป), known by the pen name Prema-ja, is a Thai cartoonist and animator. She studied decorative art at Silpakorn University then animation techniques at Ecole Pivaut in France. Her comic book Bokbig won the 2013 Gold Award at the 7th International MANGA Award.

== Works ==
- Bokbig (Thai: บุ๊กบิ๊ก) published by Cartoon Thai Institute, Foundation for Children (2012)

== Awards ==
- Bokbig – 2013 Gold Award at the 7th International MANGA Award
