= Si loin et si proche =

Manhua by Zhang Xiaobai

- Genre: Fantasy
- Author: Zhang Xiaobai
- Publisher: Kana
- Original run: 2010
- Volumes: 1

Si loin et si proche (lit. So distant and so close) is a one-shot slice of life fantasy manhua written and illustrated by Zhang Xiaobai. It was published in French by Kana on 5 March 2010.

== Reception ==
It won the Gold Award at the 4th International Manga Award in 2011. Planetebd.com's Faustine Lillaz gave the manhua a rating of 3 out of 4. Manga Sanctuary's Den d Ice gave it 3.5 out of 5 stars.
