= L'Élève Ducobu =

L'Élève Ducobu Ducoboo
- The main character with the series logo

Publication information
- Publisher: Le Lombard (French and Dutch); Cinebook (English); MTI (Indonesian)
- Format: Ongoing series
- Genre: Humor comics, Gag cartoon
- Publication date: 1992
- No. of issues: 27 (in French and Dutch); 5 (in English); 6 (in Indonesian); 8 (in Turkey)

Creative team
- Created by: Zidrou & Godi
- Written by: Zidrou
- Artist: Godi

L'Élève Ducobu is a comic series created by Zidrou (scenario) and Godi (drawing). The series tells the adventures of Ducobu, a comic and eccentric dunce. The series first appeared in September, 1992, in the Belgian comics magazine Tremplin. The first album was published in 1997 by Le Lombard and from this year have appeared in the French comics magazine Le Journal de Mickey.

== Style ==
L’élève Ducobu is an assortment of gags. Most of the story takes place at the Saint-Potache school, but some strips deal with the main character's private life and take place at home. Other strips go back into the past of the characters. Each album generally begins with the start of the school year and ends with the summer holidays.

== Characters ==
- L'élève Ducobu: the main character of the series; a very inventive dunce and joker, he is very resourceful at finding new ways to copy from his neighbour, to cheat or to defy the teacher's authority. But he always fails and each of his examination papers is rated with a zero. He spends all his time either copying, cheating, or reading Rik Spoutnik, his favorite magazine, or in the corner of the classroom with a dunce cap. He wears a pullover with yellow and black stripes, which refers to the traditional prisoners' uniform.
- Léonie Gratin, brilliant and gifted pupil and Ducobu's classroom neighbour; she continuously gets angry at all Ducobu's attempts to copy, but she sometimes naively feels some loving affection for him. She always gets a 10/10 mark, but occasionally fails owing to Ducobu's mischief, which explains why her overall score is never 10.
- Gustave Latouche, a very strict teacher; he is very demanding of his pupils. He always keeps an eye on Ducobu and foils all his attempts to cheat or copy, and succeeds in avoiding all his traps. He is single and loses his mother in the course of the series.
- Néness, the classroom anatomy skeleton; he stays all the day at the back of the classroom and waits for Ducobu to be sent to the corner. He is a joker and likes commenting on Ducobu's adventures, but he sympathizes with him and is ready to help or defend him.
- Rotule: the skeleton of a small female dog which was abandoned by its masters going in holidays. It was offered by Ducobu to Néness so that he does not get bored during the holidays.
- Ducobu's father: a lazy and frivolous civil servant at the Ministry of Employment; he takes care alone of his son, his wife having left him when Ducobu was a baby.
- Léonie's mother, in charge of the perfume section in a department store. A single mother, she is extremely proud of her daughter and always praises her school results and her hard work. She dislikes the Ducobus and does not hesitate to criticize them.
- Saint-Potache's headteacher, a woman who appears occasionally, usually wearing a green jacket. She and Mister Latouche have a good professional relationship.
- Ghislaine Rateau, music teacher at Saint-Potache, who made her debut in the 17th album. Mister Latouche has a crush on her, but is still reluctant to tell her.

== Publication in French ==
=== Albums ===
All published by Le Lombard.

1. Un copieur sachant copier ! (1997)
2. Au coin ! (1998)
3. Les Réponses ou la vie ? (1999)
4. La Lutte des classes (1999)
5. Le Roi des cancres (2000)
6. Un Amour de Potache (2001)
7. Vivement les vacances ! (2001)
8. Punis pour le meilleur et pour le pire (2002)
9. Le Fortiche de la triche (2003)
10. Miss dix sur dix (2004)
11. Peut mieux faire ! (2005)
12. 280 de Q.I. ! (2006)
13. Pas vu, pas pris ! (2007)
14. Premier de la classe (en commençant par la fin) (2008)
15. Ça sent les vacances (2009)
16. Confisqués ! (2010)
17. Silence, on copie ! (2011)
18. Révise un max (2012)
19. Ducobu, élève modèle ! (2013)
20. 0 + 0 = Duco ! (2014)
21. In-Cu-Ra-Ble ! (2015)
22. Système D (2016)
23. Profession : Tricheur (2017)
24. Attention : École ! (2019)
25. L'idole des écoles ! (2020)
26. Votez Ducobu! (2022)
27. Fini De Rire ! (2023)

=== Novel ===
1. Le Trésor de Kanul Archinul (2004)
2. 6 × 7 = Amour (2004)
3. Ducobu, instituteur ! (2004)
4. La Carotte (2004)
5. Zéro de conduite (2004)
6. Le Championnat du monde de la triche (2004)
7. La Punition du siècle ! (2005)
8. Le Voleur de vacances (2005)
9. La Méthode www.dix-sur-dix.com (2005)
10. Le Terrible Secret de Néness (2005)
11. Dans l'enfer des tables de multiplication (2006)
12. Gros Q.I et petits soucis de cœur (2006)

== Publication in English ==
The series have been translated into English by Cinebook Ltd, a British publisher specializing in Franco-Belgian comics. So far, five books have been translated in the Ducoboo series.

1. King of the Dunces, September 2006, ISBN 1-905460-15-5
2. In the Corner!, June 2007, ISBN 978-1-905460-26-7
3. Your answers or your life !, June 2008, ISBN 978-1-905460-28-1
4. The Class Struggle, May 2010, ISBN 978-1-84918-031-3
5. Lovable Dunce, September 2016, ISBN 978-1-84918-311-6

== Cinema ==
The characters of the series have been adapted for film in the French releases L'Élève Ducobu (2011), Les Vacances de Ducobu (2012) and Ducobu 3 (2020).

== See also ==
- Franco-Belgian comics
- List of Franco-Belgian comic series
