= Le Gardenie =

Malaysian comic

- Cover of Le Gardenie vol. 1 (2006), art by Benny Wong
- Genre: Romance, school
- Author: Benny Wong Thong Hou
- Publisher: Art Square Group
- Magazine: Utopia
- Original run: 2006–2008
- Collected volumes: 4 - completed

Le Gardenie is a Malaysian high school drama/romance comic created by Gempakstarz's artist, Benny Wong in 2006 and finished in 2008 in Utopia magazine's 139 issue. The series is a coming-of-age tale about a group of teenagers in a secondary school which is located in a Venice-like town set in another world, who have fruit-based names such as Lemon, Orange and Kiwi.

On June 22, 2006, Le Gardenie became the first Malaysian series to receive a Shorei encouragement prize at the inaugural International Manga Award in 2007.

Benny Wong was replaced by artist Juice (Normah Noh) under the alias GempakStarz, as Ben is now working under a new company as a creative director. The company he works for released a new series of comic/entertainment magazines titled Powder.

== Characters ==
Orange, the main protagonist of the series. He is a shy 15-year-old boy. He and his parents live in the bottom part of a conjoined house with Kiwi and her mother as their upstairs neighbor. He is Kiwi's childhood friend and classmate. He has a crush on Apple. He is oblivious to his surroundings and naive, so he is constantly being tricked and used by Lemon.

Kiwi, Orange's childhood friend and neighbor. She is a 15-year-old tomboy who lives with her mother since her father abandoned them when Kiwi was a child. She is also Orange's classmate in the bottom class of their year. She is protective of Orange to the point of beating up people who bully him. She has a bitter rivalry with Lemon. Kiwi gets expelled instead of Orange, as a result of Lemon's plan to steal the school funds by hiding them in Orange's locker, to keep him from being framed.

Apple, Orange's love interest. She is portrayed as a pleasant girl and good student, active in extracurricular activities, and listening to music in her free time. She tends to stay out of Lemon's plans, but when she was involved in Lemon's so-called 'party', she became close to Orange and realized she has feelings for him.

Lemon, a 14-year-old girl and the main antagonist of the series. She comes from a very wealthy family and is portrayed as the stereotypical 'Glamour queen' in school. She makes people's life miserable, especially other students who questions her 'authority'. She regards Orange as her pet because of his naivety, and used him as a tool to make others' lives miserable. Kiwi opposes her, but fails in the end. Lemon targeted Apple next in an attempt to ruin her budding relationship with Orange. She is the granddaughter of the school's principal, and does not hesitate to use the relationship to her advantage.

== Story ==
The intro tells the pre-story. Orange and his family moved into Picturesque Garden Town, a Venice-like town full of canals. A young Orange, curious and excited about moving into a new environment, meets an equally young Kiwi, and they become friends. Later, at the young boy's birthday celebrated in his new house, he receives his new pet, a squirrel (later to be named Charmaine).

Several years later, Orange and Kiwi, now adolescents, prepare for their first day in school. Kiwi had a little trouble getting up, and appears to be a tomboy as she wears a boy's school uniform. Arriving late to school, the duo are eager to find out their classes. Orange wants to be in separate classes from Kiwi, thinking her bad results and low grades will jeopardize his future to become a doctor, whilst Kiwi was more of an optimistic person and prefers to enjoy her school life as much as possible without studying.

In the new class, Orange receives a nasty surprise when another girl, Apple, enters with the school's principal. He is interested in making friends with Apple, perhaps sparking off a romantic relationship, but the principal states that there is a mix-up: Apple was to be in Orange's class, and Orange was to be with Kiwi. As Orange and Kiwi heads for the School Hall Assembly, Apple gives Orange a few safety pins, much to their surprise. Orange thinks she had feelings for him but, during assembly, Kiwi points out the big hole in Orange's pants, revealing his boxers. Orange's feelings of joy are replaced by embarrassment and dismay.

After dinner with his family, Kiwi comes to visit Orange, inviting him to a short cruise down a canal on a gondola. Kiwi talks to Orange about his feelings towards Apple, when suddenly a chameleon lands on Orange's face. Kiwi beats the reptile off, and as they approach a bridge, they see another couple on the bridge - Mango, one of Orange's friends, and Lemon.

The next day, Orange and Kiwi prepare for school, but Orange brings the chameleon, which they think is Mango's pet. She heads to the market to grab a bite, with Orange following her, carrying the chameleon in the saucepan. Orange meets Apple and chats her up, but she flees when the chameleon pops out of the saucepan.

After school, in the locker room, Mango reveals to Orange that he was secretly in love with Lemon, but they broke up after Mango shows his pet chameleon to Lemon, causing her to fling his pet into the canal, where it landed on Orange. As they leave the lockers, Orange found a note in his locker from Lemon, inviting him to a date in the school's compound.

An excited Orange waits in the compound, expecting Lemon to show up, but he was instead confronted by four bullies. Lemon was spying on him but when one of the bullies took a swipe at Orange's face, Kiwi comes to the rescue, kicking one of the bullies on the face and then challenging the leader. Lemon emerges to break up the fight and Kiwi confronts Lemon, feeling that she had planned the attack, when the school principal arrives. It was then revealed that Lemon is the principal's granddaughter.

After school, Kiwi did her best to reduce the swelling on Orange's face. She tells Orange that she thinks Lemon is responsible for the attack, but he brushes this aside. As she leaves, Lemon arrives, apologizing to Orange about how her note found in his locker had gotten him into trouble, and giving him a plaster to cover his bruises (coincidentally, the plaster has the motif of a lemon). She admits the leader of the bullies that picked on Orange is her cousin, who is very protective of her, then leaves in the principal's car - the school's principal actually knows Lemon was more or less responsible for the bullying.

Next day in school, Orange attracts some attention because of the plaster on his face. Mango meets Lemon again, hoping to re-evoke a relationship with her. She tells him to find Orange. During recess, Kiwi and Orange met Apple, and a furious Mango who confronts Orange. Manggo thinks Orange is after his crush, Lemon, behind him; he calls Orange a traitor and leaves in a huff. Apple, a bit shocked, leaves as well, and moments later, so does Kiwi when she realizes he had been dishonest with her.

That night, a low-spirited Orange went out alone for a stroll, thinking how he'd lost his friend, best friend, and crush in the same day. He met Lemon, and she appears to be sorry for him. She also tells him how the plaster on his face was the cause of a school fight some time ago. Seeing she was in the cold without a jacket, Orange gave her his. Another unexpected visit from Kiwi comes, because she is still worried over him and considers him as a friend.

Next day in school, Kiwi confronts Lemon, ordering her to stop manipulating her friend. Lemon merely insults Kiwi, and a fight starts, but Orange separates the girls. Apple is the only other witness to the fight that nearly broke out, but she left quickly, and moments later, so does Kiwi when Orange seems more sympathetic to Lemon than to her.

Back in her home, Kiwi expresses her feeling to the only one she trusts - Charmaine, the squirrel. In a flashback, it is revealed that Charmaine is Orange's present to Kiwi when they were young, after she saved him from bullies. Kiwi fears what will become of her friendship with Orange. All appears to be lost until Orange visits Kiwi and gave her a packet of nuts for the squirrel, which she accepts.

Things take a turn for the better the next day in school. Kiwi and Orange are close friends again. Lemon returns Orange's jacket to him. While packing their stuff in the lockers, they had an unexpected guest - one of the four bullies that assaults Orange earlier - the same person who was injured by Kiwi. The bully is actually a prefect in school, and demands that Orange follow him to the principal's office. Worried that the prefect may be one of Lemon's protégés setting a trap for Orange, Kiwi keeps Orange's jacket as the prefect leads him away. Feeling suspicious, Kiwi unlocked Orange's locker with the keys in his jacket.

Inside Orange's locker, Kiwi finds a leather bag, full of money. Suspecting foul play, she removes the money away from Orange's locker. Meanwhile, Orange and the prefect reached the principal's office. Orange finds Lemon, and Lemon's cousin that picked on him, and he is relieved to learn the principal called him because he wanted Orange to make up with the bully. But, out of the blue, the school's secretary enters, reporting the school's funds had been stolen, and all the students in the school are called to an assembly.

Kiwi, still holding the bag of money she found in Orange's locker, which she guesses is the school fund, hides in the school's garbage disposal room, where she tips all the money into a nearby garbage bin.

As Kiwi met Orange in the hall, the school's janitor, an elderly woman, comes to collect the garbage. The prefect who was previously assaulted by Kiwi was doing a clean sweep of the school to ensure all students are in the assembly, when he saw the janitor taking out the trash. Seeing her taking out a leather bag, he halts the janitor and demands she follows him to meet the principal.

In the assembly, prefects are searching every student when the prefect led the janitor to the hall, telling the school's staff the stolen school funds has been found. A student mentions seeing Kiwi sneaking to the garbage disposal room earlier with the bag of money. With all evidence pointing at Kiwi as the thief, courtesy of the prefect who made up a story on how she could've gotten away with the money, poor Kiwi had to be sent back home, while the school decides whether to expel her.

Returning home, Kiwi could only find consolation in Charmaine the squirrel - Orange didn't even try to help her, after all she has done for him. She is shocked when she finds Charmaine motionless in her bed. The aging squirrel, her pet since she was a toddler, had died in its sleep.

Orange remained in school, ashamed that he didn't stand up for her. Lemon comes, appearing to console him. There is a rude visit from the prefect who blamed Kiwi, but he left when Lemon spanks the ignorant prefect. Returning home, Orange finds poor, tearful Kiwi standing over a grave she had made for Charmaine in the backyard. The story ends at a cliffhanger as Kiwi glances at Orange.

== Sequel ==
There is a sequel to Le Gardenie, that is Le Gardenie: Foolish Fruits, which was released in August 2007. The second story picks off after the events in Le Gardenie. On 1 August 2008, the new volume, Le Gardenie: Party of Three was released. The last volume, Le Gardenie: The Final Four is released by February 2009.

== Awards ==
- 2007, International Manga Award

== See also ==
- Fatal Chaos
