= Lee Chi Ching =

Hong Kong illustrator

Lee Chi Ching 李志清
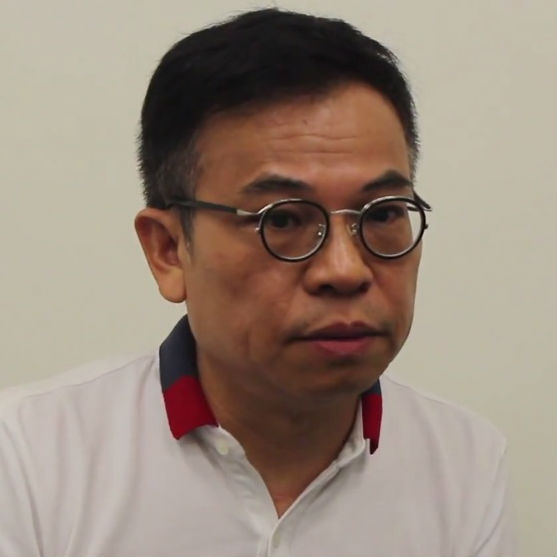
- Born: 1963 (age 62–63) Hong Kong
- Pseudonym: 清兒
- Awards: Hong Kong Contemporary Art Biennial, 1992; International Manga Award, 2007

Lee Chi Ching (Chinese: 李志清; pinyin: Lǐ Zhìqīng; born 1963) is a Hong Kong manhua illustrator with the pen name "清兒". Lee began drawing comics and graphic novels in 1981. In 1992, he won an award for his watercolors at the Hong Kong Contemporary Art Biennial and had his work housed at the Hong Kong Museum of Art. He is the first cartoonist from Hong Kong to have his work published in Japan. His speciality is in historical manga, usually based on pre-existing classic novels, including the works of wuxia writer Louis Cha. His major works include Romance of the Three Kingdoms and Water Margin.

His works are usually published by CultureCom Comics, a Hong Kong publishing house.

His work Sun Zi's Tactics won the first International Manga Award that Japanese Government sponsored in 2007.

== Manga works ==
- Records of the Three Kingdoms (三國志) – based on Romance of the Three Kingdoms
- Justice Bao (包青天)
- Nameless Hero (無名英雄)
- Strange Book (怪異集)
- Sun Zi's Tactics (孫子攻略/孫子兵法)
- Lie Shen (烈神)
- The Eagle God (驚神)
- Ghost Legend (鬼異傳奇)
- Outlaws of the Marsh – based on Water Margin
- The Legend of the Condor Heroes (射雕英雄傳) – based on The Eagle-Shooting Heroes
- The Smiling, Proud Wanderer (笑傲江湖) – based on the novel of the same name
