= SQ Begin W/Your Name! =

Manhua by Tan Jiu

- Cover for Volume 1

SQ从你的名字开始 SQ: Cóng nǐ de míngzì kāishǐ
- Genre: Comedy, Romance, girls' love
- Author: Tan Jiu
- Publisher: Zhejiang People's Fine Arts Publishing House
- Other publishers: Kadokawa (Japan)
- Original run: November 17, 2014 – present
- Volumes: 1

SQ Begin W/Your Name! (Chinese: SQ从你的名字开始; pinyin: SQ: Cóng nǐ de míngzì kāishǐ; lit. 'SQ: Starting from your name'), also known as Tamen De Gushi (Chinese: 她们的故事; lit. 'Their story') is a Chinese girls' love manhua written and illustrated by Tan Jiu. The story follows the daily lives of Sun Jing and Qiu Tong, two teenagers attending different high schools, whose newly formed friendship slowly develops into something romantic.

The manhua has been serialized independently online via Tan Jiu's Weibo and Twitter accounts from November 17, 2014, and was later published to Tencent's ACQQ app in January 2018. A paperback collecting chapters 1 through 141 was published by Zhejiang People's Fine Arts Publishing House on October 1, 2015, under the title SQ Begin W/Your Name!.

The series won a Bronze Award in the 2015 International Manga Awards.

== Synopsis ==
After Sun Jing keeps seeing the same cute girl from another school at the bus stop each day, she becomes determined to ask her name. Once Sun Jing musters up the courage and introduces herself, she begins a new friendship with Qiu Tong.

== Publication ==
Written and illustrated by Tan Jiu, SQ was first titled Tamen de Gushi and was serialized independently online via Tan Jiu's Weibo and Twitter account from November 17, 2014, before it was added to Tencent's ACQQ app in January 2018.

The series was collected into volume format by Zhejiang People's Fine Arts Publishing House under the title SQ Begin W/Your Name!, with the first volume releasing on October 1, 2015. On January 15, 2018, Tan Jiu announced that the second print volume had been indefinitely postponed due to the publisher requesting the removal of several romantic scenes between Sun Jing and Qiu Tong. Kadokawa licensed the series for a Japanese release in 2020.

No.	Original release date	Original ISBN	Japanese release date	Japanese ISBN
1	October 1, 2015	978-7534044670	February 10, 2020	978-4049130669

== Reception ==
The series was one of ten works that won a Bronze Award in the 2015 International Manga Awards, a contest in Japan for international manga artists.

Erica Friedman of Okazu gave the Japanese print volume an overall 9 out of 10 rating, praising the art and remarking that "I genuinely hope to see this title make it over here. It's really delightful and, as the comics often pass by with very little dialogue many are completely silent, it doesn't matter what language it's in." Mey Rude included the series in Autostraddle's "8 Queer/Feminist Comics to Get Your Friends Into Comics", noting that the series is "a classic story about two high school girls who fall in love and act like teenagers. Fans of Buffy, Glee, Faking It, or any other show with queer teens will fall in love with this comic."
