= Sun Zi's Tactics =

Manhua series by Lee Chi Ching

- Cover of Sun Zi's Tactics volume 10

孫子攻略 Sūn Zǐ Gōnglüè
- Genre: Historical
- Author: Lee Chi Ching
- Publisher: Culturecom Comics (Hong Kong)
- Original run: 1995–2006
- Volumes: 10

Sun Zi's Tactics (Chinese: 孫子攻略) is a historical manhua series by Lee Chi Ching, published in Hong Kong and Japan. In 2007, the series was named winner of Japan's first International Manga Award. It is based on the life of Chinese general and philosopher Sun Tzu (a.k.a. Sun Zi).

== Synopsis ==
During the chaos and confusion at the end of the Eastern Zhou dynasty, Wu Zixu and Sun Zi leave their native land of Chu for the land of Wu after their parents are killed. They take an oath of allegiance to fight for King Helü of Wu. The story portrays the life of Sun Zi and the superior art of war that he develops during the two year conflict between Wu and Chu.
