= Veerachai Duangpla =

Thai cartoonist and illustrator

- Born: May 2, 1987 (age 39) Bangkok, Thailand
- Pseudonym: The Duang
- Notable works: The Story Begins With...; BlackBoy, The Series

Veerachai Duangpla (Thai: วีระชัย ดวงพลา; born 2 May 1987), known by the pen name The Duang (Thai: เดอะดวง), is a Thai cartoonist and illustrator. He is best known for his series The Story Begins With... (Thai: เรื่องมีอยู่ว่า). The first volume won the 2010 Silver Award at the 4th International MANGA Award. His works have been published by many renown Thai publishers and are popular among Thai youth. The Duang also became famous after collaborating with VRZO production, one of the most popular YouTube channel in Thailand.

== Profile ==
Son of Thai comics artist Ruangsak Duangpla, Veerachai Duangpla started drawing comics at the age of 13, influenced by the work of his father, Thai comics like Kai Hua Rau and manga such as Dragon Ball, Shaman King or Flame of Recca. He then decided to choose the manga One Piece as his model, considering the plot more subtle. Trying to break away from manga's influence, he later introduced some elements of Tim Burton's art into his own style. He studied Visual Communication Art and Design in college and continued to explore the Western comics production, borrowing visual and narrative features from Marvel Comics or French cartoonist Nicolas de Crécy to his art. His most famous series The Story Begins With... (Thai: เรื่องมีอยู่ว่า) is a compilation of short stories concerning instructive episodes and social satires of Thailand through the eyes of a Thai boy. Published by Banlue Books, the first volume won the 2010 Silver Award at the 4th International MANGA Award. The Duang, with other Thai cartoonists of his generation such as Puck, Sa-Ard or Note, is a regular contributor to the alternative Thai magazine LET'S Comic founded in 2004.

== The Duang and VRZO ==
The Duang gained popularity with Thai teenagers through his collaboration with VRZO production, one of the most famous YouTube channel in Thailand. He adapted classical folk tales into animated cartoons which were meant to provide useful lessons to Thai teenagers. These animated cartoons gathered quickly more than a million views. The Duang also created cartoon characters based on the members of VRZO team such as Pluem Leekpai, George VRZO and Isara Hata.

== Works ==
- Clart Room (Thai: ห้องเล็ก ๆ ของเครื่องเขียน), 2006, published by Children's Foundation (Thai: มูลนิธิเด็ก, สนพ.)
- The Lesson of a Doll Boy, 2007, published by Children's Foundation (Thai: มูลนิธิเด็ก, สนพ.)
- Shockolate, 2009, published by Cartoonthai Studio (Siam Inter Comic)
- I AM, 2009, published by Cartoonthai Studio (Siam Inter Comic)
- The Story Begins With... (Thai: เรื่องมีอยู่ว่า), 2009, published by Banlue Books
- Innocent Series 2009, published by LET'S Comic
- The Story Begins With... volume 2 (Thai: เรื่องมีอยู่ว่า: ฉบับครอบครัวหัวขวด), 2010, published by Banlue Books
- Remember The Duang, 2010, published by LET'S Comic
- Around The Duang, 2010, artbook (resized edition) published by LET'S Comic
- My Inspiration, 2011, published by Fullstop Book
- Robot Boy No.03, 2011, published by Banlue Books
- The Story Begins With... volume 3 (Thai: เรื่องมีอยู่ว่า: ฉบับว่าด้วยรัก), 2011, published by Banlue Books
- สงสัยมั้ย ธรรมะ, 2011, story by Chaiyapat illustrated by The Duang, published by A Thing Book
- ขอตามเม้นท์ ทุกชาติ ทุกชาติไป, 2012, published by Children's Foundation (Thai: มูลนิธิเด็ก, สนพ.)
- Innocent Side Stories, 2012, published by LET'S Comic
- The Story Begins With... volume 4 (Thai: เรื่องมีอยู่ว่า: ฉบับ ท่วมถึงใจ), 2012, published by Banlue Books
- สงสัยมั้ย ธรรมะ ฉบับ รู้ทันทุกข์, 2012, story by Chaiyapat illustrated by The Duang, published by A Thing Book
- Quote of The Duang, 2013, published by Banlue Books
- My Inspiration II, 2013, published by Fullstop Book
- The Story Begins With... The Duang in Japan volume 5 (Thai: เรื่องมีอยู่ว่า ฉบับ มากับดวง), 2013, published by Banlue Books
- สงสัยมั้ย ธรรมะ พุทธทาส ฉบับ เช่นนั้นเอง, 2013, story by Chaiyapat illustrated by The Duang, published by A Thing Book
- The Story Begins With... volume 6 (Thai: เรื่องมีอยู่ว่า: ฉบับ สามัคคีดีกัน), 2014, published by Banlue Books
- BlackBoy, The Series - First Chapter: Kill'em All, 2014, published by LET'S Comic
- สงสัยมั้ย ธรรมะ ฉบับ ทุกข์ไม่มีจริง, 2014, story by Chaiyapat illustrated by The Duang, published by A Thing Book
- The Story Begins With... volume 7 (Thai: เรื่องมีอยู่ว่า ฉบับ ต้อมแต้มและแก๊งเพื่อน), 2015, published by Banlue Books
- Tomtam's Diary & Super Robot, 2015, published by Banlue Books
- สงสัยมั้ย ธรรมะ ฉบับ ความปกติ, 2015, story by Chaiyapat illustrated by The Duang, published by A Thing Book
- B&W: Black & White, 2016, published by LET'S Comic
- VRZO - (Thai: นิทาน "เด็กช่างกับสาวขายไอติม)

== Awards ==
- The Story Begins With... (Thai: เรื่องมีอยู่ว่า), 2010, Silver Award at the 4th International MANGA Award
