= Li Lung-chieh =

Taiwanese comics artist

Li Lung-chieh 李隆杰
- Born: September 16, 1982 (age 44)
- Area: Comic artist

Li Lung-chieh (李隆杰) is a Taiwanese manga artist. Some of his works include Roachgirl (覺醒人間-螂女飛翔傳) and Taiwan Determination : Legend of Beigang (新世紀北港神拳). He was nominated in the Algiers International Comics Festival of Algeria with his comic book Animal Impact (動物衝擊頻道) in 2011. He published Taiwan Super Riders (台灣超級機車) and exhibited in Angoulême International Comics Festival and Planet Manga of Centre Georges Pompidou in 2012.

== Publications ==
- Roachgirl (覺醒人間-螂女飛翔傳, Tong Li Publishing Co., 2008, ISBN 9789861031255)
- Animal Impact (動物衝擊頻道, Elephant White Cultural Enterprise Co., 2010, ISBN 9789866216770)
- Taiwan Super Riders (台灣超級機車, Elephant White Cultural Enterprise Co., 2011, ISBN 9789866047848)
- Taiwan Determination : Legend of Beigang (新世紀北港神拳, Gaea Books, Co., 2013, ISBN 9789863190752)
- Ichthyophobia (怕魚的男人, China Times Publishing Co., 2015, ISBN 9789571362953）
- Koxinga Z (1661國姓來襲, Gaea Books, Co., 2017, ISBN 9789863192817, ISBN 9786263841888)
- Formosa X (1624男人與島, Gaea Books, Co., 2021, ISBN 9789863196051)

== Publications (French editions) ==
- Ichthyophobia (Nazca Editions, 2021, ISBN 9782902487141)
- Koxinga Z - 1661 (Nazca Editions, 2023, ISBN 9782902487516)
- Formosa X - 1624 (Nazca Editions, 2024, ISBN 9782902487929)

== Awards ==
- Ichthyophobia (怕魚的男人) - 2016 Silver Award at the 9th International Manga Award
- Koxinga Z (1661國姓來襲) - 2019 Bronze Award at the 12th International Manga Award
