= Bumbardai =

Mongolian manga series

Publication information
- Publisher: Image Comics
- Schedule: Monthly
- Format: Limited series
- Genre: Fantasy
- Publication date: 2014
- No. of issues: 108

Creative team
- Created by: N. Erdenebayar
- Written by: N. Erdenebayar
- Artist(s): N. Erdenebayar

Bumbardai (often stylized as БУМБАРДАЙ) is a Mongolian comics series, written and illustrated by N. Erdenebayar. The comics won Grand Prize at the International Manga Award in 2015.
