= Madeleine Rosca =

Australian artist, writer (born 1977)

- Born: Madeleine Bensley; 1977 (age 48–49)
- Areas: Writer, Artist
- Awards: International Manga Award

Madeleine Rosca (born Madeleine Bensley; 1977) is an Australian artist and author. She also writes Rise from Ashes, a supernatural webcomic series.

== Biography ==
She grew up in country Victoria and earned a Bachelor of Arts in Visual Arts from Monash University. She also received qualifications from Swinburne University (multimedia) and the University of Tasmania (information management). She currently resides in Hobart, Tasmania. Rosca is best known for her all-ages manga, Hollow Fields, which is published by Seven Seas Entertainment. She was singled out for special mention in a November 2007 article in Wired on the history of manga in America.

== Works ==
Rosca has published four volumes on her series Hollow Fields, and two volumes of the series called Clockwork Sky. She also worked on a webcomic named Rise from Ashes.

== Awards ==
Rosca was one of four winners presented with Japan's inaugural "International Manga Award" for her work on Hollow Fields.
