= Jordi Lafebre =

Spanish illustrator and comic book artist (born 1979)

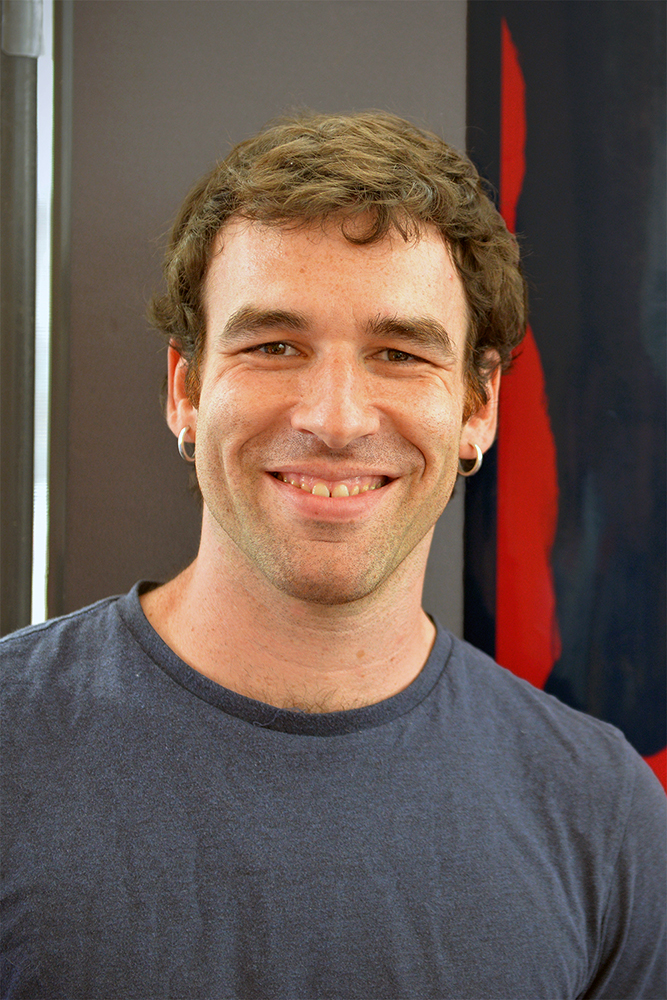
- Jordi Lafebre, in 2014
- Born: 1979 (age 46–47); Barcelona, Catalonia, Spain
- Occupations: illustrator, comic book artist

Jordi Lafebre (born 1979) is a Spanish illustrator and comic book artist and writer active in the Franco-Belgian market.

== Biography ==
Lafebre was born in Barcelona. After studying drawing at the University of Barcelona and comics at the Joso School in Barcelona, he started working in 2001 as an illustrator for advertisements and various magazines in Spain (including Nobanda, Penthouse Comix and Wet Comix). In the children's magazine Mister K, he published El mundo de Judy on a script by Toni Font. His meeting with the Belgian scriptwriter Zidrou, who lives in Spain, was decisive: with him, Jordi Lafebre drew some short stories published in Le Journal de Spirou, which would be included in two collective albums La vieille dame qui n'avait jamais joué au tennis et autres nouvelles qui font du bien (The Old Lady Who Never Played Tennis and Other Good News) and Joyeuses nouvelles pour petits adultes et grands enfants (Happy News for Small Adults and Big Children), then launch into one-shots with Lydie and La Mondaine, before starting the series Les Beaux étés (Glorious Summers). In 2020 he published the graphic novel Malgré tout (Always Never), as a writer and artist. In parallel to his career as an author, Jordi Lafebre also helps animation studios to develop their projects as a character designer and visual development artist.

== Publications ==
- La vieille dame qui n'avait jamais joué au tennis autres nouvelles qui font du bien, written by Zidrou, art by Sergio Cordoba, Monsieur H., José Homs, Maly Siri, Esther Gili, Pedro J. Colombo, Jordi Lafebre, Jordi Sampere, Laurent Van Beughen, Dupuis, 2009.
- ¿Dónde van las cosas que se pierden? (Spanish "Where do lost things go?), written by Jordi Lafebre, art by Moni Pérez, Beascoa, 2010.
- Joyeuses nouvelles pour petits adultes et grands enfants, written by Zidrou, art bt Alexeï Kispredilov, Denis Bodart, Édith, Frank, Mio Franco, Jordi Lafebre, Oriol, Roger, Laurent Van Beughen, Will, Dupuis, 2010.
- Lydie, written by Zidrou, Dargaud, 2010.
- La Mondaine, two volumes, scénario de Zidrou, Dargaud, 2014.
- Les Beaux Étés (Glorious Summers), written by Zidrou, Dargaud, 2014.
  1. Cap au Sud, 2015.
  2. La Calanque, 2016.
  3. Mam'zelle Estérel, 2017.
  4. Le Repos du guerrier, 2018.
  5. La Fugue, 2018.
  6. Les Genêts, 2021.
- Malgré tout (Always Never), written and art by Jordi Lafebre, Dargaud, 2020.
- Je suis leur silence – Un polar à Barcelone (I Am Their Silence), written and art by Jordi Lafebre, Dargaud, 2023.
- Je suis un ange perdu – Un polar à Barcelone, written and art by Jordi Lafebre, Dargaud, 2025

== Awards ==
- 2010: prix Diagonale for best album, with Zidrou, with Lydie.
- 2020: Lucca Comics fumetto dell'anno with Zidrou, with Un'estate fa
- 2021: Prix Uderzo for the best album Malgré tout
- 2021: Silver International Manga Award, Malgré tout
