= Lau Wan-kit =

Hong Kong comics artist

Lau Wan-kit 劉雲傑
- Born: July 19, 1966 (age 60) Hong Kong
- Pseudonym: Jeffrey Lau
- Awards: International Manga Award, 2008

Lau Wan-kit (Chinese: 劉雲傑, born on July 19, 1966), also known as Jeffrey Lau, is a comic artist from Hong Kong.

Lau joined the comics business field as a comics assistant in 1985, and became an artist in 1988 with his first work "Anti-ROCK" in Comics For City People. In 1991, he had his first Collection Interlude (段段情濃), and became the symbol of local love comics. Feel 100% of 1992 was a great success and changed his comics business. It has been adapted into movies and online drama many times.

Happy Tennis was released in 2007 from The One Comics Publishing LTD.

His work Feel 100% won the International Manga Award that Japanese government sponsored in 2008.

== Works ==
- Anti-ROCK (1988)
- Interlude (猎杀天雠) (1991)
- Feel 100% (1992–2007)
- Happy Tennis (2007-)
