= Zidrou =

Belgian comics artist

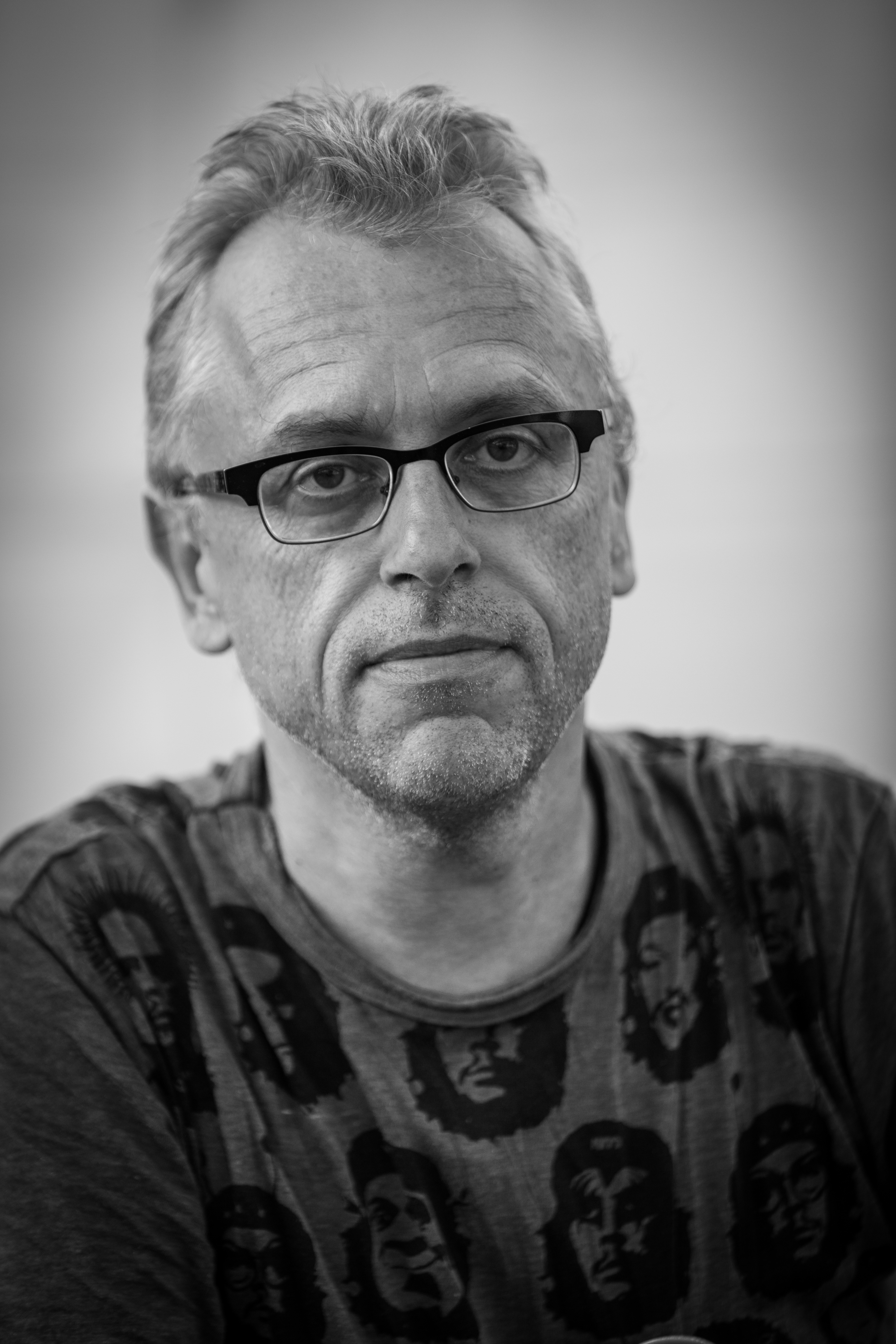
- Born: Benoît Drousie; April 12, 1962 (age 64); Anderlecht, Brussels-Capital, Belgium
- Notable work: Tamara
- Movement: Children's comics Graphic novels

Benoît Drousie (born 12 April 1962), who signs as Zidrou, is a Belgian comic book writer.

== Life and career ==
Born in Anderlecht, Drousie worked as a teacher for six years before writing for comics in the early 1990s. He published his first comic in the 1991 Christmas supplement of Spirou magazine, with "La triste fin du Père Noël", drawn by De Brab. In 1992 he formed a writing studio with his friend Falzar, with whom he published the first album of the series Margot et Oscar Pluche, again with art by De Brab . The following year, he would establish himself as a screenwriter on various series for the weekly magazine Spirou.

During the 1990s, he would establish himself as one of the weekly's most versatile humor writers, creating series such as L'Élève Ducobu, Tamara, and the aforementioned Margot et Oscar Pluche, and signing a multitude of short comics drawn by different artists. Starting in the 2000s, and without abandoning his collaborations with Spirou, he would start writing more serious comics, specializing over time as a writer of graphic novels and thrillers.

== Works published in English ==
- L'Élève Ducobu/Ducoboo (Cinebook)
  - King of the Dunces, September 2006, ISBN 1-905460-15-5
  - In the Corner!, June 2007, ISBN 978-1-905460-26-7
  - Your answers or your life !, June 2008, ISBN 978-1-905460-28-1
  - The Class Struggle, May 2010, ISBN 978-1-84918-031-3
  - Lovable Dunce, September 2016, ISBN 978-1-84918-311-6

2010

- Lydie (with Jordi Lafebre, Dargaud) (ISBN 9782505008088)
  - English version:Lydie Translated by Mercedes Claire Gilliom. Europe Comics, 2018 (ISBN 9791032805374)

2013

- Pendant que le roi de Prusse faisait la guerre, qui reprisait ses chaussettes? (with Roger, Dargaud)
  - While the king of Prussia was waging war, who do you think was darning his socks? (2017,Europe Comics) (ISBN 979-1032803097)

2014

- La Mondaine (art by Jordi Lafebre, Dargaud)
  - Tome 1 (ISBN 978-2505048466)
    - English version: The Vice Squad, vol. 1. Europe Comics, 2016 (ISBN 979-1032802182)
  - Tome 2; 2014 (ISBN 978-2505019916)
    - English version: The Vice Squad, vol.2. Europe Comics, 2017 (ISBN 979-1032802472)

2015:

- Les beaux étés (Glorious Summers) series (art by Jordi Lafebre, and colors by Mado Peña, Dargaud)
  - 1. Cap au Sud, 2015 (ISBN 978-2-505-06198-4)
    - English version: Southbound! , 2018, Europe Comics (e-book)
  - 2. La Calanque, 2016 (ISBN 978-2-505-06532-6)
    - English version:The Calanque,2018, Europe Comics (e-book)
  - 3. Mam'zelle Estérel, 2017 (ISBN 978-2-505-06776-4)
    - English version:Little Miss Esterel, 2018, Europe Comics (e-book)
  - 4. Le Repos du guerrier, 2018 (ISBN 978-2-5050-7055-9)
    - English version:The Warrior's Haven, 2019, Europe Comics (e-book)
  - 5. La Fugue, Dargaud, Bruxelles, 2018, (ISBN 978-2-505-07400-7)
    - English version:The Runway, 2018, Europe Comics (e-book)
  - 6. Les Genêts, 2021 (art by Jordi Lafebre,colors by Mado Peña and Clémence Sapin) (ISBN 978-2-505-08935-3)

2016:

- L'Adoption series (drawn by Arno Monin, Bamboo Édition)
  - 1. Qinaya, 2016 (ISBN 978-2-8189-3603-0)
  - 2. La Garùa, 2017 - (ISBN 978-2-8189-4170-6)
  - 3. Wajdi, 2021 (ISBN 978-2-8189-7689-0)
  - 4. Les Repentirs, 2023, (ISBN 978-2-8189-8936-4)
  - 5. Le Sourire du plombier,2024 (ISBN 979-10-41103-18-8)
  - English version: The Adoption (Magnetic Press, 2020) (ISBN 978-1942367833)

2017

- Natures mortes (drawn by Oriol, Dargaud)
  - English version:The Muse, 2018, Europe Comics (ebook)
- Emma G. Wildford (drawn by Edith, Soleil)
  - English version:Emma G. Wildford, (2018, Titan Comics)

2018

- L'obsolescence programmée de nos sentiments (drawn by Aimée de Jongh, Dargaud)
  - English version:Blossoms in Autumn (translated by Matt Madden, SelfMadeHero, 2019)

2020

- La bête/Marsupilami:The Beast (art by Frank Pé, Dupuis)
  - Volume 1, 2020
    - English version: Europe Comics, 2021
  - Volume 2, 2023

2021

- La balleine bibliothèque (drawn by Judith Vanistendael)
  - English version:The Whale Library (Europe Comics, 2021)
