= Miljohn Ruperto =

Los Angeles-based visual artist

Miljohn Ruperto (born 1971, Philippines) is a Los Angeles-based visual artist.

== Education ==
Ruperto received a Bachelor of Arts degree from University of California, Berkeley, and a Master of Fine Arts degree from Yale University.

== Work ==
Ruperto's work has been described as "speculat[ing] on the nature of assumed facts and construction of truth," and utilizing "an intriguing play between an apparent sense of control, or purpose, and the actual lack of it." His work "challenges fixed conceptions of truth and history, and instead speaks of an indeterminacy and subjectivity of experience that renders truth and fiction near indistinguishable."

In 2007, Ruperto began work on a five-part project revolving around Isabel Rosario Cooper, a Filipina actress who became the mistress of U.S. General Douglas MacArthur. The series uses historical archives, film, video and photography in order to reframe and re-center a historically peripheral figure.

In 2012, the Whitney Biennial featured Ruperto's "Voynich Botanical Studies." The work, a series of photographs of imaginary plants based on illustrations from the Voynich Manuscript, is an ongoing collaboration with Danish artist Ulrik Heltoft. Ruperto and Heltoft "created [the images] with 3-D modeling software that blends found images and textures into uncanny amalgamations... strikingly mysterious plant forms that appear to levitate against their deep black backgrounds."

In 2017, Ruperto's solo show at REDCAT Gallery, Los Angeles, featured his installation "Geomancies," which included a film, photographs, video works, and a performance piece. The installation wove together elements taken from science, mythology, American history, literature, and horror film.

Ruperto's ongoing project, "The Great Disappointment," centers around the Millerites, a 19th-century apocalyptic sect. The series, which premiered at Ruperto's solo show at the Cantor Arts Center in 2026, includes a VR experience of the prophesied apocalypse, which the Millerites had believed would take place on October 22, 1844, and a camera obscura which projects a 24-hour generative stream of that day.

== Exhibitions ==
==== Selected Solo Exhibitions ====
- 2026: Cantor Arts Center, Palo Alto
- 2026: Minnesota Street Project, San Francisco
- 2017: REDCAT, Los Angeles

==== Selected Group Exhibitions ====
- 2021: Esok, Jakarta Bienniale, Jakarta
- 2019: Every Step in the Right Direction, Singapore Bienniale, Singapore Art Museum, Singapore
- 2018: On the Shoulders of Fallen Giants, Industrial Art Biennial, Croatia
- 2014: Whitney Biennial, Whitney Museum of American Art, New York
- 2012: Made In L.A., Los Angeles

== Collections ==
Ruperto's work is part of the permanent collections of the Museum of Modern Art, the Whitney Museum of American Art, the Hammer Museum, the Walker Art Center, and the Cantor Arts Center, among others.
