= Chezhina Svetlana =

Kazakh comic artist (b. 1985)

- Born: January 12, 1985 (age 41); Rudniy, Kostanay Province Kazakhstan
- Occupation: Comics artist
- Writing career
- Pen name: Midorikawa Tsuyoshi
- Genres: drama, fantasy
- Website: midorikawa.ru

Chezhina Svetlana (Russian: Чежина Светлана Игоревна), born January 12, 1985, is a comic book artist from Kazakhstan. She works under the Japanese masculine pseudonym Midorikawa Tsuyoshi (Japanese: 緑川毅志) that can be translated as "Green River, a strong soul (heart)".

== Biography ==
Svetlana was born in 1985 in the town of Rudniy, Kostanai Province, Republic of Kazakhstan.

In 2000 she entered the Chelyabinsk Art College and finished in 2004.

== Works ==
Comics

- The name: Dream

Genre: Shōjo\Shōnen. Adventures with elements of fantasy and mysticism.

- The name: Portrait

Genre: a psychological drama.

Illustrations

- The Hidden Tokyopop (story by Barbara Lien-Cooper and Park Cooper)
- Firefly [ホタル] Chris Lawrence

== Awards ==
- "The Best Poster 2003", the magazine "Gen-13" (Rovesnik publisher, Moscow);
- Cover the fan-zine "Poppuri Anime", October, 2004 Project "Wings of a dragonfly", a character Ogata Nomu (founder Ltd." Maya ", Kirov);
- "The best manga 2005" magazine "Gen-13", Draft manga "Dream \ Yume" (Rovesnik publisher, Moscow);
- Participant-Moscow international festival to draw stories "KomMissia2006". Draft manga "Dream \ Yume", among the other participants, took a part of the exhibition in the art-gallery "M'Ars", Moscow;
- 1 Place in the competition drawings magazine "Anime Guide", July 2007. The "Крылья стрекозы \ Wings of a dragonfly" (publisher and founder Ltd. "Anime Guide", Moscow).
- In September 2008 in Tokyo, Japan, Chezhina Svetlana won silver award at The 2nd International Manga Award for her manga "Portrait".
