= Chen Wenxuan =

Chen Wenxuan may refer to:

- Tan Boen Soan (1905–1952), ethnic Chinese Malay-language writer and journalist of Indonesia
- Yu Wo (born 1984), Taiwanese novelist
