= The Legend of Sun Knight =

Book series by Yu Wo

- Created by: Yu Wo
- Light novel
- Written by: Yu Wo
- Illustrated by: Ya Sha
- Original run: July 10, 2007 – August 28, 2012
- Volumes: 8 volumes

The Legend of Sun Knight (traditional Chinese: 吾命騎士; simplified Chinese: 吾命骑士; pinyin: wú mìng qíshì) is a Taiwanese novel series written by Yu Wo. It was originally published in Taiwan, later also being translated into Thai. The series was completed in eight volumes, and Yu Wo wrote several spin-offs. It was later adapted into a manhua. Narrated by the eponymous Sun Knight, Grisia Sun, the story follows the exploits of the 38th generation of the Twelve Holy Knights. It takes place on a polytheistic, fictional continent during a pseudo-medieval time period, with a social structure similar to that found in high fantasy role-playing games.

In this world, where gods are real and constantly striving for power, various religions have formed to worship the most powerful deities. The oldest and most respected of these religions is the Church of the God of Light, based in the Kingdom of Forgotten Sound. The Church of the God of Light was founded and led by the renowned Twelve Holy Knights, each of whom had a distinctive personality. The following generations of the Twelve Holy Knights are expected to have the same recognizable characteristics, forcing them to conceal their true selves.

== Plot ==
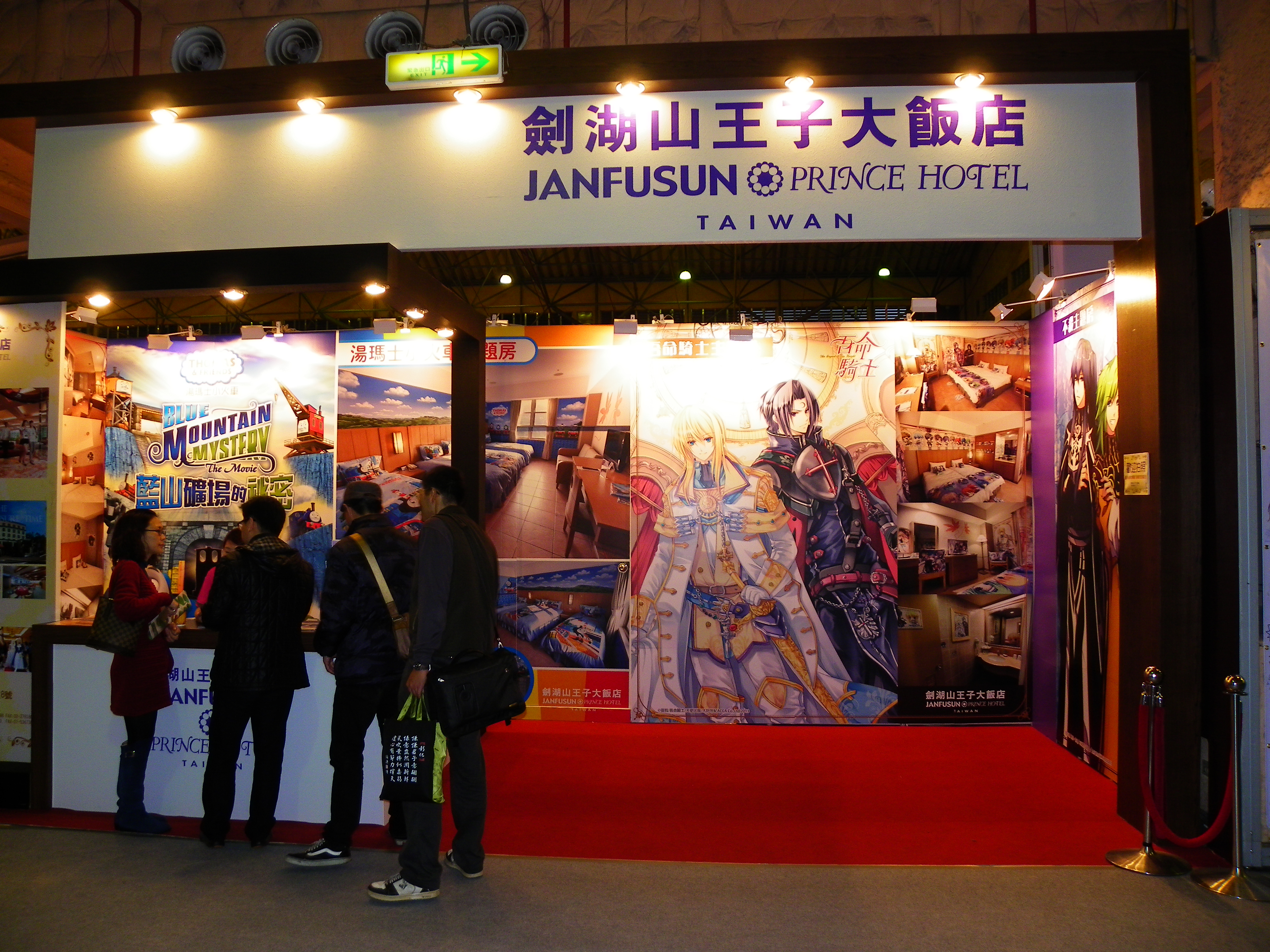
A hotel lobby with posters of The Legend of Sun Knight.

The corrupt king of Forgotten Sound attempted to weaken the Church of the God of Light by framing Grisia Sun, the 38th generation Sun Knight, for the murder of a royal guard. When the guard was resurrected as a Death Knight, a powerful undead creature, Sun investigated and discovered that the guard was his childhood friend Roland. With the help of Pink, the necromancer that resurrected Roland, and the rest of the Twelve Holy Knights, Sun revealed the truth behind Roland's death and overthrew the king. At the coronation of the crown prince, the Son of the God of War proposed to the princess, who was secretly in love with the Hell Knight. Sun arranged for a battle to be held for the hand of the princess, and with Roland's help made the Son of the God of War concede the match.

Soon after this, Sun and Elmairy Leaf traveled to the Kingdom of Moon Orchid to attend a wedding, arriving to find that the bride had been kidnapped and they had to join a rescue team to bring her back. At one point, Sun was separated from the team in order to help the previous Sun Knight retrieve a treasure called the Eternal Silence. During his absence, Leaf was killed in a battle with the kidnapper. Upon his return, Sun successfully resurrected Leaf but permanently lost his sight as a result. When Sun hunted down the kidnapper to exact his revenge, the kidnapper revealed himself to be the Silent Eagle, a high-ranking official of the Cathedral of the Shadow God. Before Sun could kill him for harming Leaf, Pink stepped in, claiming to be one of the three lich acolytes of the Shadow God. Sun then named the Silent Eagle "Awaitsun" as a reminder to eternally await Sun's revenge.

Following a confrontation with Pink, Sun woke up with amnesia in the Kingdom of Kissinger, where he joined an adventuring group as their cleric. The group attempted to capture a unicorn, only succeeding when a mysterious girl called Scarlet guided Sun to it. On their way to collect the reward, the group fought the Ice Knight and took him as a hostage. The remaining Twelve Holy Knights came together to stop them, unfortunately waking a dragon in the process. Sun regained his memories just in time to help the Twelve Holy Knights defeat the dragon.

Upon returning to Forgotten Sound, the Twelve Holy Knights discovered that the capital, Leaf Bud City, was being overrun by undead creatures that shared a connection with Scarlet. To combat Scarlet, Sun asked Pink and a dark elf named Aldrizzt to teach him psychic magic. Using psychic magic, Sun and the Twelve Holy Knights managed to seal Scarlet inside the Eternal Silence. Sun was then summoned by the king to meet representatives of the Cathedral of the Shadow God, Awaitsun being one of them, who explained that a powerful dark creature called the Demon King would soon be awoken in Leaf Bud City. To Sun, Awaitsun privately revealed that Sun was one of the three candidates to become the Demon King.

While searching for the other candidates, Sun met two of the other Cathedral representatives, Stephen and Charlotte Anastas, who revealed themselves to be one of the lich acolytes and the second candidate, respectively. After defeating them, Sun tried to contact Pink to concede his candidacy, only to be killed by Roland, Pink's candidate, who then left to take the throne. After recovering from his resurrection, Sun traveled to the Cathedral of the Shadow God to confront Roland, successfully convinced him to step down, and took up the mantle of the Demon King himself. To prevent the dark magic from corrupting Sun, the Twelve Holy Knights cast a spell sealing his power, thus allowing him to remain the Sun Knight.

== Characters ==
=== Forgotten Sound ===
==== The Church of the God of Light ====
===== The Twelve Holy Knights (38th Gen) =====
The Twelve Holy Knights are the representatives of the God of Light, and the most powerful members of the Church of the God of Light. They are evenly divided into two factions, 'warm-hearted' and 'cold-hearted,' and their order of command is aligned accordingly. Each of the Twelve Holy Knights leads a platoon of one vice-captain and twenty-four unranked holy knights. Their faith allows them to use Holy Light, a magic unique to the followers of the God of Light.

"Knight-Captain Sun"

The blond, blue-eyed Sun Knight is the elegant leader of the 'warm-hearted' faction and the head of the Twelve Holy Knights. He is known for his devotion to the God of Light and his boundless compassion, granting forgiveness to even the most heinous criminals. However, he is merciless and lethal when dealing with dark creatures. He is the sole wielder of the Divine Sun Sword and possesses limitless Holy Light.

Grisia Sun (The 38th generation Sun Knight & the 21st generation Demon King)

Unathletic and devious, Grisia uses his abnormal magical abilities to pull off outrageous schemes and defend the Sun Knight's reputation. He is extremely loyal to the Twelve Holy Knights, even considering them to be his family, and would do anything to protect them. His independent nature makes him secretive and, at times, self-destructive. This has resulted in the permanent loss of his sight, among other things. Grisia also has a serious sweet tooth, and gives insulting nicknames to many of his companions.

"Knight-Captain Storm"

A footloose charmer with bright blue hair, the Storm Knight represents freedom. He is a member of the 'warm-hearted' faction and is well-known for his rebellious behavior, skipping out on work to flirt shamelessly with any and all women in his general vicinity. His friendly, outgoing nature makes him a natural diplomat, and he has a long history of supporting rebellions for the sake of freedom. The Storm Knight fights using a form of martial arts based on powerful kicks, and is the fastest member of the Twelve Holy Knights.

Theo Storm (The 38th generation Storm Knight)

A pragmatic workaholic, Theo is almost solely responsible for keeping the Church of the God of Light functional. This leaves him in a constant state of exhaustion with little time to himself. Despite this, he makes an effort to support his fellow knights and is considered the head of the Twelve Holy Knights in the absence of Grisia and Lesus. He rarely has the patience for Grisia's elaborate schemes, and generally tries to remain uninvolved. Grisia has nicknamed him "Deatheo," much to his frustration.

"Knight-Captain Leaf"

The kindest member of the 'warm-hearted' faction, the Leaf Knight is sweet and never refuses to do anyone a favor. He looks after his fellow knights, going out of his way to cheer them up; he does the same for anyone else he encounters, his charitable nature making even complete strangers feel welcome. He wields the Divine Leaf Bow with such accuracy that he can shoot the wings off a butterfly 100 meters away. Like the Sun Knight, he is ruthless when confronting a dark creature.

Elmairy Leaf (The 38th generation Leaf Knight)

Genuinely kind and helpful, Elmairy always steps in when his fellow knights disagree and often lends a hand with Grisia's various schemes. He is a skilled cook, although his taste for extravagant spices leaves him chronically broke. When Grisia was blinded healing him, Elmairy gained superhuman eyesight, making him an even more formidable archer. He has extensive knowledge on the occult and uses voodoo as an anger management technique. Grisia has nicknamed him "Strawberry."

"Knight-Captain Blaze"

Loud and rambunctious, the hot-headed Blaze Knight is the most straight-forward member of the 'warm-hearted' faction. His loyalty to the Twelve Holy Knights, and to the Sun Knight, is legendary. He specializes in exorcism, although he will eagerly battle against living (and undead) opponents as well. Given his skill in purification, he is often assigned missions in distant locations to deal with dangerous spirits.

Chikus Blaze (The 38th generation Blaze Knight)

Reckless and quick-tempered, Chikus easily maintains his Blaze Knight persona, although he tends to awkwardly fuss over his fellow knights when they're hurt. He is fiercely loyal to Grisia for having rescued him from Pink's dungeon when they were young, and is the first to defend him in any situation. His relationship with Demos is strained, as Chikus instinctively tries to exorcise his ghostly companion on sight. He has been nicknamed "Freakus" by Grisia.

"Knight-Captain Earth"

The Sun Knight's closest friend, the Earth Knight is a member of the 'warm-hearted' faction and renowned for his honesty. He is shy and stutters when he speaks, but his level-headed temperament and steadfast support makes him a trustworthy companion. The Earth Knight is second only to the Sun Knight in Holy Light, making him one of the most powerful members of the Twelve Holy Knights. He is the only Holy Knight capable of casting the "Shield of Earth," and is exclusively defensive when in battle.

Georgo Earth (The 38th generation Earth Knight)

Georgo is an unapologetic playboy who uses his Earth Knight persona to appeal to women, although Grisia torments him by unfailingly interrupting any potentially romantic moments. This animosity is, in part, because Georgo is the only member of the Twelve Holy Knights who refuses to get involved in any of Grisia's schemes. Due to their bitter rivalry, Georgo has also not received a nickname. His impatient personality makes him more aggressive than his defensive fighting style suggests.

"Knight-Captain Cloud"

A free-spirited drifter, the Cloud Knight is the only Holy Knight capable of "Cloud-Stepping," a secret footwork technique that allows the user to smoothly evade incoming attacks and to strike unnoticeably. His quiet demeanor makes him the calmest of the 'warm-hearted' faction, and he spends his time sleeping under trees or reading in patches of sunlight.

Demos Cloud (The 38th generation Cloud Knight)

A ghostly introvert, Demos enjoys hiding in cabinets and, later, in the library. He takes books very seriously, and usually will only appear when the bell on the library help desk is rung. His mastery of Cloud-Stepping is so complete that he can even dodge lines of sight. Before becoming the Cloud Knight, he had been enslaved by a group of bandits for three years. Grisia has nicknamed him "Deedee."

"Knight-Captain Judgement"

The Judgement Knight is the head of the 'cold-hearted' faction and second-in-command to the Sun Knight; he alone is responsible for the interrogation and conviction of those who have sinned. His cruel methods are widely known, as is his skill in wielding the Divine Judgement Sword. Although he's technically under the command of the Sun Knight, there is unending friction between the two over the proper way of dealing with sinners, and they frequently disagree.

Lesus Judgement (The 38th generation Judgement Knight)

Grisia's best friend, Lesus is dependable and greatly respected by the Twelve Holy Knights. He specializes in solving crimes through meticulous investigation; despite his diligence, the gruesome sights he encounters during interrogations make him nauseous, and he has difficulty in maintaining the Judgement Knight's cruel reputation. He is an expert swordfighter, to the point that he can identify others just by watching them fight. Grisia has never given him a nickname.

"Knight-Captain Ice"

An aptly assigned member of the 'cold-hearted' faction, the Ice Knight is expressionless, unfeeling, and aloof. He wields the Divine Ice Sword, and is second only to the Judgement Knight in skill. His fighting style is passive in nature; the Ice Knight will wait patiently for his opponent to approach, watching closely for the moment they enter his range, where he finishes them off with a single, fatal thrust. It is unusual to hear the Ice Knight speak.

Ecilan Ice (The 38th generation Ice Knight)

Reliable and patient, Ecilan comes from a family of bakers and enjoys making sweets for his fellow knights. He keeps detailed notes on their tastes, although he reserves the right to withhold these sweets from anyone who annoys him. Outside of baking, he is a dedicated swordfighter. Despite his chilly exterior, he gets quite flustered when his fellow knights are hurt. Grisia has nicknamed him "Wastelan."

"Knight-Captain Moon"

A demanding aristocrat, the Moon Knight is prideful and rarely considers anyone worthy to be in his presence, forever looking down on others. Even his superiors, the Judgement Knight and the Sun Knight, are barely deserving of his respect. He is always regal, dignified, and extremely arrogant. The Moon Knight is a member of the 'cold-hearted' faction and wields a whip in battle.

Vival Moon (The 38th generation Moon Knight)

A hopeless romantic, Vival yearns for a sweetheart of his own; unfortunately, looking down his nose at everyone has given him permanent neck cramps, so his only options are girls that match his impressive height. He treasures any gifts given to him by his lover, and takes break-ups very badly. Vival is earnest and unquestioningly loyal to Lesus; he is also quite talented with his whip. Grisia has nicknamed him "Viola."

"Knight-Captain Metal"

The Metal Knight is known for his hostile nature and poisonous words, eagerly provoking anyone he encounters. Like his fellow 'cold-hearted' knight, the Moon Knight, he is disrespectful even to the Judgement Knight and the Sun Knight. He specializes in pursuit and concealment, and fights using a variety of knives. The Metal Knight is also skilled in thievery and assassination, giving him an unsavory reputation.

Laica Metal (The 38th generation Metal Knight)

Laica shares the sharp tongue of his persona and often speaks without thinking, turning even his most sincere apologies into insults. He can be hotheaded, and doesn't always get along with his fellow Holy Knights. His masochistic tendencies have led to Laica idolizing Lesus for his expertise in torture techniques. He enjoys playing with knives in his free time, and has spent hours practising with them. Grisia has nicknamed him "Slime."

"Knight-Captain Stone"

The Stone Knight is a member of the 'cold-hearted' faction and the most level-headed of the Twelve Holy Knights. In addition to having incredible strength, he is famous for being uncompromising and imperturbable. It's been said that overthrowing the Church of the God of Light would be easier than trying to change his mind. Despite his obstinacy, the Stone Knight is the only member of the 'cold-hearted' faction to handle diplomacy.

Aivis Stone (The 38th generation Stone Knight)

Stubborn as his persona, Aivis is amiable and enjoys teasing his fellow Holy Knights. In his training years, his charisma led to him nearly being deemed unsuitable as the Stone Knight's apprentice and replaced. He is one of the strongest fighters among the Twelve Holy Knights, although he only engages in combat in dire circumstances.

"Knight-Captain Hell"

The Hell Knight is the only member of the 'cold-hearted' faction who follows the command of the Sun Knight over that of the Judgement Knight, and specializes in espionage. He rarely makes public appearances, and little is known about him. Because of this, the Hell Knight is widely thought to be a false identity assumed by the Sun Knight during times of conflict.

Elijah Hell (The 38th generation Hell Knight I)

Elijah was assigned by the Pope to go deep undercover as a member of the Royal Guard of Forgotten Sound, where he met and fell in love with Princess Jasmine. He trained under the guidance of the 37th generation Hell Knight for one year before entering the Royal Guard, later resigning as the Hell Knight entirely. His charming personality and easy-going nature allow him to fit in anywhere.

Roland Hell (The 38th generation Hell Knight II)

Grisia's childhood friend, Roland was runner-up at the Sun Knight selections and went on to become a well-respected captain of the Royal Guard. After attempting to expose the King's misdeeds, he was tortured to death and resurrected as a Death Knight, later evolving into a Death Lord, and after that a Death Monarch. Stoic and commanding, he takes everything seriously and values integrity. Due to Grisia's meddling, he took up the title of Hell Knight after Elijah stepped down.

===== The Twelve Holy Knights (37th Gen) =====
Neo Sun (The 37th generation Sun Knight)

Known as the "Strongest Sun Knight in History," he's Grisia's mentor and lives for the thrill of battle. Despite his irresponsible nature, he cares deeply for his student. Neo grew up as a part of the royal family, and carries himself with great dignity. After retiring as the Sun Knight, he left Leaf Bud City to become an adventurer and soon thereafter befriended Aldrizzt.

Lanbi Storm (The 37th generation Storm Knight)

Lanbi is highly protective of his student, Ceo, and bitterly resents anyone who mistreats him.

Wen Leaf (The 37th generation Leaf Knight)

Wen is Elmairy's mentor, and was the first member of the 37th generation to get married. He is also a heavy drinker, and does not get along well with Neo.

Fahr Blaze (The 37th generation Blaze Knight)

Fahr tends to mother his fellow Holy Knights, including his student, Chikus. He can be easily provoked, usually by Chikus acting out, and finds acting as the Blaze Knight exhausting.

Chasel Judgement (The 37th generation Judgement Knight)

Lesus's mentor and the only man alive who can intimidate Neo, Chasel is a gentleman and took his duties very seriously. Given his calm, collected demeanor, the members of the 37th generation often turned to him for guidance. After retiring as the Judgement Knight, Chasel moved to the edge of Leaf Bud City and later established a friendly correspondence with Aldrizzt.

Eller Ice (The 37th generation Ice Knight)

Eller is talkative and enthusiastic, often bragging about his student, Ecilan, to his fellow Holy Knights. He enjoys Ecilan's baking, and eagerly supports his efforts to improve.

Hayseth Moon (The 37th generation Moon Knight)

Hayseth is fond of gambling, despite a life-long losing streak; this has resulted in him becoming slightly superstitious and afraid of bad luck. He dotes on his student, Vival.

Danzbert Metal (The 37th generation Metal Knight)

Danzbert is Laica's mentor and constantly frustrated with his students inability to speak rudely at the appropriate moments. He is very loud, and dislikes it when anyone makes fun of his name.

===== Other Members of the Church =====
Pope of the Church of the God of Light

The Pope is a high-ranking member of the Church of the God of Light, surpassed in authority only by the Twelve Holy Knights. The current pope has held the papacy since before the time of the 37th generation of the Twelve Holy Knights, but inexplicably looks like a 15-year-old boy. He and Grisia often clash when their schemes demand different courses of action.

Cardinal of Light

The Cardinal of Light is the shared title of two highly-ranked members of the Church of the God of Light who both answer directly to the Pope, and consists of; the Bishop of Radiance, a woman who specializes in defensive magic; and the Bishop of Brilliance, a man who specializes in offensive magic.

Kylie

A cleric of the God of Light, Kylie travels with an adventuring group in Kissinger and greatly respects the Twelve Holy Knights.

Adair

Grisia's competent vice-captain of the 38th Sun Knight Platoon, Adair handles most of the Sun Knight's official duties. He is extremely loyal to Grisia, remaining so even after Grisia became the Demon King, and follows his orders without question.

Ed

A talkative member of the 38th Sun Knight Platoon, Ed is good friends with Adair. He often gets on Grisia's nerves.

Kleenly

Neo's former vice-captain of the 37th Sun Knight Platoon, Kleenly was a talented holy knight who strove to catch up to his captain's strength. He was actually selected to become vice-captain by Chasel.

Luchi

Demos's vice-captain of the 38th Cloud Knight Platoon, Luchi spends much of his time trying to locate his captain.

Vidar Brigg

Lesus's vice-captain of the 38th Judgement Knight Platoon, Vidar idolizes Lesus and eagerly obeys his every command. He is youthful and can be quite energetic.

Noley

Chasel's former vice-captain of the 378th Judgement Knight Platoon, Noley has a brisk personality and occasional mischievous tendencies. He and Kleeny often trained together.

Tyler

Roland's vice-captain of the 38th Hell Knight Platoon, Tyler originally held a grudge against Roland for attempting to take command several years after the platoon had already been formed. Roland slowly earned his respect and loyalty, enough that he followed Roland even after learning his true identity as a Death Monarch.

Faterlin

A member of the 38th Hell Knight Platoon. He gets drunk very easily, much to the amusement of his fellow holy knights.

==== Nobility of Forgotten Sound ====
King

The piggish former king of Forgotten Sound and father of Archer and Jasmine. He was secretly responsible for torturing many of the palace maids to death and later doing the same to Roland. He abdicated after his misdeeds were exposed by the Twelve Holy Knights.

King Archer

The honest, frugal king of Forgotten Sound, his royal duties include making reparations for his father's crimes. He and Neo grew up together, and refer to each other mockingly as "Archie" and "Nee-Nee." He only wants what is best for the people of Forgotten Sound, and is fond of Grisia, despite his irritation with Grisia's constant scheming.

Princess Jasmine

The dutiful princess of Forgotten Sound, Jasmine is Archer's younger sister and considers Neo to be her brother as well. She and Elijah are in love.

Baron Gerland

A noble of Forgotten Sound, Baron Gerland is head of the Gerland family and seeks to undermine the Church of the God of Light's authority.

=== Moon Orchid ===
==== Monastery of the God of War ====
Son of the God of War / Mike

The representative of the God of War, he is the highest authority within the Monastery of the God of War. Although he has received divine power and strength from the God of War, his birth father, Austin, was human. His real name is Mike.

Austin

A warpriest of the God of War, Austin is also the Son of the God of War's birth father.

==== Nobility of Moon Orchid ====
Queen of Moon Orchid

The Queen of Moon Orchid and mother of Alice, Ann, and Allie. She maintains a telepathic link between herself and her female knights in order to silently issue confidential commands.

Princess Alice

The eldest princess of Moon Orchid, Alice is also a skilled mage specializing in wind magic. She gave up her right to the throne of Moon Orchid upon eloping with Awaitsun, and resides with him in the Cathedral of the Shadow God.

Princess Ann

The second princess of Moon Orchid, Ann is one of the strongest warriors of the Monastery of the God of War, and is good friends with the Son of the God of War. She has a crush on Elmairy.

Princess Allie

The youngest princess of Moon Orchid, Allie is betrothed to the Son of the God of War.

=== Kissinger ===
==== Cathedral of the Shadow God ====
Pink

A lich acolyte of the Shadow God, Pink is Roland's sponsor and an experienced necromancer. Pink was under contract with the Church of the God of Light to provide a controlled supply of weak undead creatures. Roland's demise and subsequent resurrection were orchestrated by her in order to ensure his success in the battle against the other Demon King candidates. Her true name is Pink Corpse. She is named for her bright pink skin, a result of her death by the inhalation of poisonous gas.

Scarlet

A lich acolyte of the Shadow God, Scarlet is Grisia's sponsor and loves him as a mother would. She led Grisia to the unicorn, later using it as her own steed. She also assisted the Twelve Holy Knights in sealing the Demon King's power in order to protect Grisia from the corruption of dark magic. Her true name is Corpse Claret, named for her death by exsanguination.

Stephen Anastas

A lich acolyte of the Shadow God, Stephen is Charlotte's sponsor and Awaitsun's second-in-command. He, like Pink and Scarlet, kept his identity as a lich a secret until the time came for the Demon King to be born. His true name is Corpse Phen, taken from the perfume he was doused in before his death by poisoning.

Awaitsun

The Silent Eagle is the highest ranked member of the Cathedral of the Shadow God, and is responsible for the coronation of the Demon King. As the Silent Eagle is the closest person to the Demon King, they are not allowed to have personal connections or names of their own; however, Awaitsun was given a name and allowed to marry Princess Alice. He is also good friends with Taylen.

Charlotte Anastas

Charlotte is the youngest shadowpriest in the history of the Cathedral of the Shadow God, and one of the Demon King candidates. She is amoral and considers the lives of others to be expendable, save Grisia, whom she met and befriended as a child. Her skill in dark magic is unrivaled.

Illu

A powerful dark creature and general of Roland's dark army. Illu was created using Roland's own blood, making him intensely loyal to Roland. He is uneasy around Grisia.

=== Adventurers ===
Aldrizzt

Aldrizzt is a dark elf who denounced the cruel ways of his people and escaped to the surface, where he became Neo's travelling companion. Well-read and sensible, he is a skilled mage and fruitlessly endeavors to keep Neo out of trouble. He is the only dark elf to ever be welcomed by the elves, who recognise him as reformed and allow him into their territory. His character is loosely based on that of Drizzt Do'Urden, a drow (dark elf) character in Dungeons & Dragons.

Woodrow's Party

Grisia joined Woodrow's party as a cleric while suffering from amnesia, and traveled with them for some time. Led by Woodrow, a stern druid who can transform into an Asian black bear, it consists of; Yuna, a kind warpriest of the Monastery of the God of War; Sybil, an archer who finds Grisia attractive; Iacchi, a rogue with a painfully loud voice; and Igor, a warrior.

Michel's Party

After becoming the Demon King, Grisia traveled with Michel's party for a time. Led by Michel, it consists of; Taylen, who is secretly Tayder, the prince of Kissinger; and Charlotte, who shares some similarities with Charlotte Anastas.

== Media ==
Novels

Individual chapters of The Legend of Sun Knight were originally posted on Yu Wo's blog, first appearing December 25, 2006, and being completed July 15, 2010. These chapters were later collected into eight volumes by Angel Publishing, a sub-brand of Spring Publishing. The original novels were accompanied by illustrations by Ya Sha, and the republished editions were illustrated by JU. A collection of non-chronological side stories were also gathered and published. All the chapters have been translated into other languages by Prince Revolution, an online translation group, with the permission of Yu Wo.

Manhua

October 5, 2010, a five-volume series of manhua following the events of the novels was launched by The One Comics. They are illustrated by Cat Cross (formerly known as Os Rabbit Cat.) It has been partially translated into English by Odd Squad Scanlations, an online scanlation group, and Easy Going Scans, another online scanlation group.

"Unbeatable"

A spin-off of the original novels was released October 3, 2009, showcasing how Aldrizzt and Neo met and became friends. It has been translated online by Prince Revolution.

"Female Warrior"

A two-volume prequel to The Legend of Sun Knight was self-published by Yu Wo in 2012. It features the original generation of the Twelve Holy Knights. An artbook was also released alongside the prequel, featuring art by Wu Ling. It has been translated online by Prince Revolution.

"39 - The Legend of Sun Knight"

August 28, 2012, the first of a trilogy was released, following the story of the 39th generation of the Twelve Holy Knights. The accompanying illustrations are by JU. The second and third volumes have yet to be released. It has been partially translated online by Prince Revolution.

Mobile Game

A mobile game based on the world of The Legend of Sun Knight was produced by Soft-World and made its debut at the 2015 Tokyo Game Show. It is a card battle RPG-style game, allowing the player to form a team and level up through battles against computer-generated opponents.
