= 1/2 Prince =

Book series by Yu Wo

1/2 Prince (1/2 王子 Èrfēnzhīyī Wángzǐ)
- The first novel of the 1/2 Prince series
- Author: Yu Wo (御我)
- Cover artist: Ya Sha (亞砂); Ikusabe Lu (戰部露, Zhànbù Lù); Xiao Qiang (小強)
- Country: Taiwan
- Language: Traditional Chinese characters
- Genre: Action, Adventure, Science Fantasy
- Publisher: Min-hsien Cultural Enterprise
- Published: October 4, 2004 — August 15, 2005
- Media type: Print (Paperback)

1/2 Prince (1/2 王子 Èrfēnzhīyī Wángzǐ) is a series of nine Taiwanese novels written by Yu Wo (御我). They are published by Min-Hsien Cultural Enterprise in Taiwan and were released between October 4, 2004 and August 15, 2005. In 2006, the novels were adapted into a manhua by Choi Hong Chong (蔡鴻忠) which were published by Tong Li Publishing.

The plot takes place in a futuristic world where surreal virtual reality games exist. The protagonist is a 19-year-old female student named Feng Lan (風藍), who is challenged into playing the newly arrived game Second Life by her twin brother. As the first person to log into the game, Feng Lan is given a wish which she uses to give herself the privilege of creating a male avatar whom she names as Prince. In game, she strives to prove to her brother Feng Yang Ming (風揚名) that she can be a capable player.

== Plot ==
Feng Lan is a 19-year-old girl who is challenged by her twin brother to play a virtual reality game called Second Life. Being the first player to log onto the game, she is allowed to distinguish her real life looks from her avatar; thus she creates a handsome male elf named Prince. In game, she forms a team called the Odd Squads which consists of: Lolidragon, a female hidden game moderator; Ugly Wolf, a beast race Priest character; Doll, a necromancer; Guilastes, a bard with an attraction to Prince; and Yu Lian, a female mage. As the story progresses, the Odd Squads compete in a tournament emerging victorious and are awarded a large city which they name as Infinity City which Prince is voted to lead. Before the city is open to the public, Prince leaves in search of comrades to serve under her and wanders onto another continent. There, she befriends her real life friends, Lu Jing and Yun Fei and becomes involved in a hidden quest which awards her with two NPCs with self-awareness, Kenshin and Sunshine.

As the plot progresses, Prince learns that a self-aware NPC named Lord of Life is commanding an army of NPCs to delete the humans which will prevent them from returning to the game. In response, Prince gathers players throughout the game in order to combat the threat. It is revealed Long Dian is the cause of the AI rebellion and wishes to gain eternal life through Second Life. Long Dian's NPCs take control of the world's superweapons and forces the world's best scientists to give him a new body. Prince and her companions defeat Long Dian's new super-human body, ending his reign of terror. During the battle, Guilastes saves Feng Lan's life and Feng Lan eventually chooses and marries Guilastes.

=== Characters ===
Odd Squad (非常隊 Fēicháng Duì)

Feng Lan (風藍 Fēng Lán) is a 19-year-old girl who was given permission to create a male character in Second Life, whom she named 'Prince' (王子 Wángzǐ). As Prince, she becomes infamous for her handsome looks and cruelty in battle, even earning the nickname 'Blood Elf'. She eventually teams up with five other players to become "Odd Squad". The team consists of: Lolidragon (小龍女 Xiăo Lóng Nǚ), a human thief and hidden gamemaster who assists Feng Lan in her avatar creation. Her true identity is Long Shui-han (Lóng Shuǐhán), daughter of the owner of Second Life; Ugly Wolf (醜狼 Chŏu Láng), the bestial healer and strategist of the Odd Squad. His real life identity is Feng's university doctor, Li Tian-lang (李天狼 Lĭ Tiānláng); Doll (娃娃 Wáwa), a bouncy necromancer who uses Second Life as an escape from her duties as a real-life princess; Guiliastes (居里亞斯特斯 Jǖlĭāsītèsī), a bard who quickly fell head-over-heels for Prince, eagerly joining Odd Squad and taking up the position of long-ranged attacker. As Min Gui-wen (閔居文 Mĭn Guìwén), he's Feng Lan's genius university professor; and Yu Lian (羽憐 Yŭ Lián), a mild-mannered mage and financial manager of Odd Squad, she's actually a servant of Doll's and joined Second Life in order to keep an eye on her. She and Ugly Wolf fell in love and were later married. As the story progresses, the group also gain in game pets. Prince gains a talking meatbun and two self-aware NPCs, a swordsman named Kenshin (劍心 Jiànxīn) and a powerful mage named Sunshine (陽光 Yángguāng), while, Guiliastes receives a Phoenix. After winning a mass of land through a tournament, the Odd Squad begins building an empire called Infinity City (無垠城 Wúyín Chéng).

Dark Emperor (暗黑邪皇隊 Ànhēi Xié Huáng Duì)

Dark Emperor is a team led by Wicked (邪靈 Xié Líng). His real life identity is Zhuo Ling-bin (卓靈斌 Zhuó Língbīn), Feng Lan's senior in university who has harbored feelings towards her for the past eight years. After learning Feng is Prince, he becomes protective of her in game and prevents Guiliastes' advances towards her. His team consists of: Ming Huang (明皇 Míng Huáng), his short-tempered real life younger brother; Feng Wu-qing (風無情 Fēng Wúqíng), Feng's twin brother; and minor characters named Ambusher (狙擊手 Zŭjìshŏu), Playboy Lord (偷香公子 Tōu Xiāng Gōngzĭ), and Black Lily (黑百合 Hēi Băihé).

Other notable players

While starting out, Prince was helped by Snow White Rose's (雪白玫瑰 Xuěbái Méiguì) and Fairsky's (晴天 Qíngtiān) group. Rose and Fairsky developed a strong crush on Prince but are able to move on; Fairsky later develops a relationship with Sunshine. Rose's real life identity is Feng Lan's cousin by marriage.

During Prince's recruitment for Infinity City, she becomes involved in the affairs of in game player Nan-gong Zui (南宮罪 Nángōng Zuì). Nan-gong's sister, Ice Phoenix (浴冰鳳凰 Yù Bīng Fènghuáng), falls for a playboy in Second Life named Fan (梵 Fàn). Fan does not care for Phoenix and uses her feelings for him to his advantage. As such, Prince intervenes, allowing Phoenix to realize Fan's true personality.

Lu Jing (綠晶 Lǜ Jīng) and Gu Yun-fei (古雲非 Gǔ Yúnfēi) are Feng Lan's classmates. Their in game classes are Daoshi and Barrier Master respectively. She meets them in Second Life when she wanders onto another continent. She later takes the two and has them join Infinity City. As the series progresses, two are able to deduce her identity as Prince.

Lord of Life (生命主宰 Shēngmìng Zhǔzǎi)

The Lord of Life (also translated as "Dictator of Life") is a self-aware NPC who controls Second Life. Due to the influences of Long Dian (龍典 Lóng Diǎn), the main programmer of Second Life, the Lord forms an army of NPCs to remove humans from the game of Second Life. Since Feng Lan began playing Second Life, the Lord had taken an interest in her and had been watching and assisting her in her adventures.

== Media ==
=== Novels ===
The series is written by Yu Wo and was published by Min-hsien Cultural Enterprise in Taiwan between October 4, 2004 and August 15, 2005. The novels were reprinted in 2012 with redone artwork and character descriptions when the eighth volume, signifying the end of the story, was released.

=== Manhua ===
Written by Yu Wo and illustrated by Choi Hong Chong, the 1/2 Prince manhua was serialized in Dragon Youth Comic (龍少年 Lóng Shàonián).
