= Yu Wo =

Taiwanese writer

Yu Wo (御我)
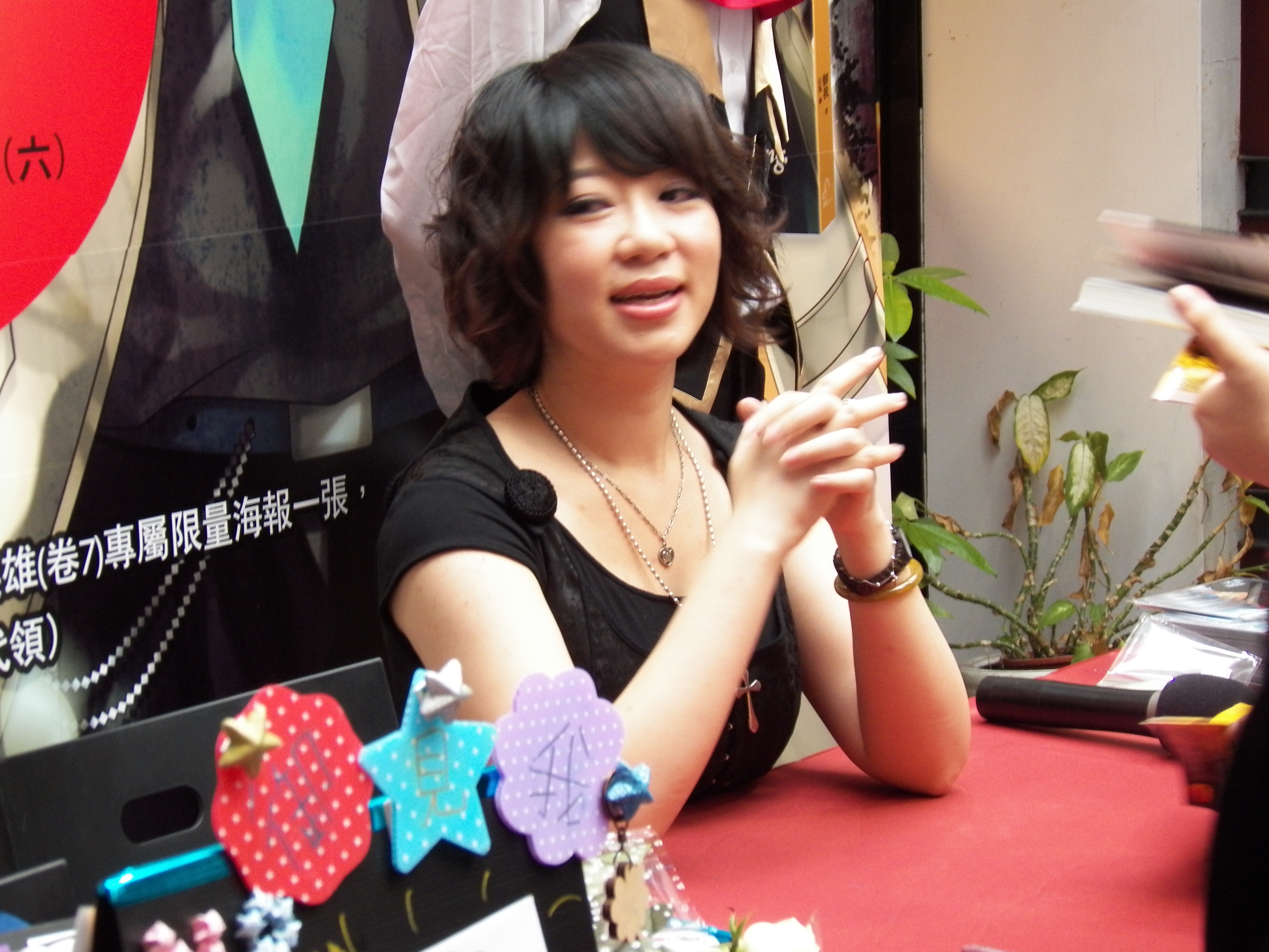
- Yu Wo at a book-signing party for No Hero
- Born: Chén Wénxuān (陳玟瑄); April 29, 1984 (age 42)
- Occupation: Writer
- Writing career
- Period: 2004 - present
- Genre: Light novels
- Subject: Fantasy
- Website: blog.xuite.net/kim1984429/yuwo

Yu Wo (Chinese: 御我), born Chen Wenxuan (陳玟瑄), is a Taiwanese light novelist, best known for creating 1/2 Prince.

== Career & personal life ==
After graduating high school, she attended National Cheng Kung University from 2002–2006. She got her start in writing by reading online novels. A large number of these books had male protagonists, with women serving as sidekicks. She began posting stories online with this archetype flipped. Min-Hsien Cultural Enterprise Co. Ltd. took note of Yu Wo's postings and agreed to publish her first light novel in 2004, titled 1/2 Prince. The light novel was illustrated by Ya Sha. After her light novel was published, it became successful in Taiwan, and was adapted into a comic by Choi Hong Chong, which was serialized in the magazine Dragon Youth Comic in 2004. Kill No More was then published the following year. She graduated from her university in 2006 and published Romance RPG and GOD, which were illustrated by Yuyue Boxin(玉越博幸) and Guang Shi (光矢) respectively. In 2007, she published her second popular series entitled The Legend of Sun Knight. It was also successful in Taiwan and became a comic in 2010, published by The One Comics. The Legend of Sun Knight manhua was adapted by Os Rabbit Cat. The third of Yu Wo's light novels to become popular was Hunting of the Shaded Guardian. Alongside 1/2 Prince, Ya Sha illustrated the novel versions of Kill No More, The Legend Of Sun Knight, and Hunting of the Shaded Guardian. No Hero was published in 2008 as an indirect sequel to Hunting of the Shaded Guardian with a different main character but in the same fictional universe. It was illustrated by Shan Gui (山鬼) until the 7th volume, and by Lü Chuanming (綠川明) from the 8th volume onwards. Magical Exchange was published in the same year. Black Flower was published in 2009 and illustrated by Monto C3. Female Warrior, a prequel to The Legend of Sun Knight, was published in 2012 and illustrated by Wu Ling (午零). Human Doll Contract was published in 2013 and illustrated by Jiu Yue Zi (九月紫).

Several of Yu Wo's works have been repackaged, i.e. the original story split into a different number of volumes with different cover illustrations. The 12 pocket volumes of 1/2 Prince were illustrated by Ikusabe Lu and published from 2006 to 2007. The repackaged version of 1/2 Prince was illustrated by Xiao Qiang COCO (小強COCO) and first published in 2011. For Kill No More, the repackaged version was published from 2009 to 2010 and illustrated by Xiao Tie(小鐵). The repackaged version of Hunting of the Shaded Guardian was illustrated by Blaze.

For spin-offs, the sequel to The Legend of Sun Knight, titled 39, was illustrated by J.U., the artist who also illustrated the repackaged version of the main story and the Simplified Chinese version.

=== Other languages ===
The Legend of Sun Knight and No Hero began publication in Thai in 2009.

== Bibliography ==
=== Light novels ===
Color Key

– Original/repackaged version of the main story
– Side-story
– Sequel
– Prequel

Title	Chinese Name	Publication Status	Year	Volume Titles	ISBN
1/2 Prince	《1/2王子》	8 volumes (complete)	2004–2005	1. The Beginning of a Legend; 2. Fantasy and Reality; 3. Records of the Vagabond Prince; 4. The Buskers of Infinite City; 5. A Prince No More; 6. The Great NPC Revolt; 7. Life, Fading Away; 8. Infinite Legend	1. ISBN 9789867391209; 2. ISBN 9789867391513; 3. ISBN 9789867391650; 4. ISBN 9789867391834; 5. ISBN 9789867391841; 6. ISBN 9789867303318; 7. ISBN 9789867303530; 8. ISBN 9789867303806
1/2 Prince	《1/2王子》歪傳	1 side-story volume (complete)	2009	1. 'Warped' Biographies	1. ISBN 9789867201829
1/2 Prince	《1/2王子完全版 (口袋書)》	12 pocket volumes (complete)	2006–2007	N/A	1. ISBN：9789861713625; 2. ISBN：9789861713670; 3. ISBN：9789861714059; 4. ISBN：9789861714547; 5. ISBN：9789861715018; 6. ISBN：9789861715513; 7. ISBN：9789861715889; 8. ISBN：9789861716251; 9. ISBN：9789861716299; 10. ISBN：9789861716886; 11. ISBN：9789861716978; 12. ISBN：9789861717364
1/2 Prince	《1/2王子新裝版》	7 repackaged volumes (complete)	2011–present	1. The Beginning of a Legend; 2. The Great Virtual Reality Tournament; 3. Boundless Invincibility; 4. Prince and The King; 5. The Dictator of Life; 6. The Intertwinement of the Virtual and Reality; 7. A Long Long Time Ago...	1. ISBN 9789862607527; 2. ISBN 9789862608807; 3. ISBN 9789862609682; 4. ISBN 9789862992623; 5. ISBN 9789862994047; 6. ISBN 9789862995679; 7. ISBN 9789862997239
Kill No More	《不殺》	13 volumes (complete)	2005–2006	N/A	1. ISBN 9789867201492; 2. ISBN 9789867201782; 3. ISBN 9789867201843; 4. ISBN 9789861710273; 5. ISBN 9789861710594; 6. ISBN 9789861710877; 7. ISBN 9789861711225; 8. ISBN 9789861711232; 9. ISBN 9789861711676; 10. ISBN 9789861712079; 11. ISBN 9789861712338; 12. ISBN 9789861712734; 13. ISBN 9789861713595
Kill No More	《不殺》外傳	1 side-story volume (complete)	2008	1. The Demon King's Kiss	1. ISBN 9789862180808
Kill No More	《不殺 (精裝版)》	8 repackaged volumes (complete)	2009–2010	1. The Killer Who Doesn't Kill; 2. The Sealed Killer; 3. The Killer's Partner; 4. The Killer's Old Friend; 5. The Prince Who's A Killer; 6. The Killer Who Sheds Tears; 7. The Smiling Killer; 8. The Killer Who Became A King	1. ISBN 9789862185773; 2. ISBN 9789862186671; 3. ISBN 9789862187005; 4. ISBN 9789862187586; 5. ISBN 9789862188569; 6. ISBN 9789862189474; 7. ISBN 9789862602690; 8. ISBN 9789862605080
Romance RPG	《戀愛RPG》	1 volumes (complete)	2006	N/A	1. ISBN 9789867055538
GOD	《GOD》	11 volumes (complete)	2006–2008	1. (The Pet) Bai Saya; 2. (The Pet) The Elf, Alan; 3. (The Pet) The Little Angel, Ya Ya; 4. (The Pet) Xing Jian Sai Mi; 5. (The Pet) Princess Beir; 6. (The Original Sins) A Growing Wrath; 7. (The Original Sins) The Prideful Demon King; 8. (The Original Sins) A Greedy Investment; 9. (The Original Sins) The Final Desire; 10. The Truth about Judgment Day; 11. Judgment Day and A New Beginning	1. ISBN 9789861714110; 2. ISBN 9789861714462; 3. ISBN 9789861715063; 4. ISBN 9789861715421; 5. ISBN 9789861715711; 6. ISBN 9789861716077; 7. ISBN 9789861717203; 8. ISBN 9789861717739; 9. ISBN 9789861718750; 10. ISBN 9789861719924; 11. ISBN 9789862180860
The Legend of Sun Knight	《吾命騎士》	8 volumes (complete)	2007–2011	1. An Introduction to Knight Theory; 2. The Daily Duties of a Knight; 3. To the Rescue of a Princess; 4. To Slay a Dragon; 5. Undying Lich (2 volumes); 6. The End of the Demon King (2 volumes)	1. ISBN 9789868352902; 2. ISBN 9789866688010; 3. ISBN 9789866688096; 4. ISBN 9789866688195; 5. ISBN 9789866688546; 6. ISBN 9789866688744; 7. ISBN 9789866688744; 8. ISBN 9789866219689
The Legend of Sun Knight	吾命騎士外傳《無敵》	1 side-story volume (complete)	2009	1. Unbeatable	self-published
The Legend of Sun Knight	《吾命騎士》（漫畫版）外傳	side-stories in volumes 4-6 manhua bundle (complete)	—	N/A	N/A
The Legend of Sun Knight	吾命騎士（簡體書）	8 Simplified Chinese volumes (complete)	2012	N/A	1. ISBN 9787514307627; 2. ISBN 9787514307634; 3. ISBN 9787514307641; 4. ISBN 9787514307658; 5. ISBN 9787514307696; 6. ISBN 9787514307702; 7. ISBN 9787514307788; 8. ISBN 9787514307795
The Legend of Sun Knight	吾命騎士外傳《39》	1 side-story^{[A]} volumes (scheduled to end on 3rd volume)	2012	N/A	1. ISBN 9789865945145
The Legend of Sun Knight	吾命騎士新版	5 repackaged volumes (ongoing)	2013	1. Basic Knight Theory	1. ISBN 9789865945053
Hunting of the Shaded Guardian (Unofficial translation: Eclipse Hunter)	《玄日狩》	5 volumes (complete)	2007–2008	1. Protection; 2. Friendship; 3. Humanity; 4. Study; 5. Love	self-published
Hunting of the Shaded Guardian (Unofficial translation: Eclipse Hunter)	《玄日狩》(商業版)	5 repackaged volumes (complete)	2011	1. Brotherhood; 2. Friendship, Feelings; 3. Angel ‧ Massacre; 4. A Genuine or Fake World; 5. True Love's Demon	1. ISBN 9789866219344; 2. ISBN 9789866219405; 3. ISBN 9789866219481; 4. ISBN 9789866219566; 5. ISBN 9789866219757
No Hero^{[B]}	《非關英雄》	9 volumes (complete)	2008–2015	1. Vampire Chamberlain; 2. The Hero Coming With Death; 3. Killer No Men; 4. The Castle of Vampire; 5. Fallen Angel; 6. Heaven or Hell; 7. The End, The Beginning (Part 1 & 2); 8. Endless Deal	1. ISBN 9789866688157; 2. ISBN 9789866688263; 3. ISBN 9789866688430; 4. ISBN 9789866688607; 5. ISBN 9789866688843; 6. ISBN 9789866219290; 7. ISBN 9789866219986; 8. ISBN 9789865945312
Magical Exchange	《神魔交易所》	1 volume (complete)	2008	N/A	self-published
Black Flower	《公華》	4 volumes (complete)	2009–2014	1. Episode I: Abandoned Flower; 2. Episode II: Revenge; 3. Episode III: Choice; 4. Episode IV: Confrontation	1. ISBN 9789866688676; 2. ISBN 9789866219016; 3. ISBN 9789866219504
Female Warrior^{[C]}	《女武》	2 side-story volumes (complete)	2012	1. Light and Shadow; 2. The Number is 12	self-published
Illusion, Lies, and Truth	《幻·虛·真》	4 volumes (ongoing)	2013–present	1. Human Doll Contract (Part 1 & 2); 2. Writer; 3. In the Name of God (Part 1 & 2)	1. ISBN 9780020130253
The Region (Unofficial translation: Dominion's End)	《終疆》	5 volumes (ongoing)	2014–present	1. Raining Stars at World’s End; 2. Foreign Capital; 3. Frozen Emperor	1. ISBN 9780020130253

=== Manhua ===
Title	Status in Country of Origin	Artist	Year	ISBN
1/2 Prince	16 volumes (ongoing)	Choi Hong Chong	2004	1. ISBN 9789861195049; 2. ISBN 9789861006307; 3. ISBN 9789861014340; 4. ISBN 9789861022055; 5. ISBN 9789861031279; 6. ISBN 9789861038773; 7. ISBN 9789861051079; 8. ISBN 9789861127019; 9. ISBN 9789861074085; 10. ISBN 9789861078762; 11. ISBN 9789861093482; 12. ISBN 9789863172130; 13. ISBN 9789863248569
The Legend of Sun Knight	5 volumes (hiatus)	Os Rabbit Cat	2010	1. ISBN 9789866219184; 2. ISBN 9789866219412; 3. ISBN 9789866219672; 4. ISBN 9789865945220
Kill No More	2 volumes (ongoing)	A-Wei	2013	1. ISBN 9789863271215; 2. ISBN 9789863275473

== Notes ==
- A The sequel to The Legend of Sun Knight is about the 39th generation of the Twelve Holy Knights.
- B No Hero is the retitled sequel to Hunting of the Shaded Guardian.
- C Female Warrior is the retitled prequel to The Legend of Sun Knight. It is about the 1st generation of the Twelve Holy Knights.
