= Winners & Sinners =

1983 Hong Kong film by Sammo Hung

- Film poster for Winners and Sinners

Chinese name
- Traditional Chinese: 奇謀妙計五福星
- Simplified Chinese: 奇谋妙计五福星
Transcriptions
Standard Mandarin
- Hanyu Pinyin: Qí Móu Miāo Jǐ Wŭ Fú Xīng
Yue: Cantonese
- Jyutping: Kei4 Mau4 Miu6 Gai3 Ng5 Fuk1 Sing1
- Directed by: Sammo Hung
- Written by: Sammo Hung; Barry Wong
- Produced by: Raymond Chow; Leonard Ho
- Starring: Sammo Hung; Jackie Chan; Yuen Biao; Richard Ng; Charlie Chin; John Shum; Stanley Fung; Cherie Chung
- Cinematography: Ricky Lau
- Edited by: Peter Cheung
- Music by: Frankie Chan; Chris Babida
- Distributed by: Golden Harvest
- Release date: 7 July 1983
- Running time: 101 minutes
- Country: Hong Kong
- Language: Cantonese
- Box office: HK$21,972,419 (Hong Kong); 285,579 tickets (Seoul City)

Winners & Sinners (Chinese: 奇謀妙計五福星, also known as 5 Lucky Stars) is a 1983 Hong Kong action comedy film written and directed by Sammo Hung, who also starred in the film. The film co-stars Jackie Chan and Yuen Biao, the latter serving as one of the film's action directors. It was the first in the Lucky Stars series of films, a highly successful series in Hong Kong.

The film co-stars Chan in a significant role as an error-prone police officer. It also features a cameo appearance from Yuen as another police officer who gets into a fight with Chan's character.

The film is followed by My Lucky Stars and Twinkle, Twinkle Lucky Stars, insofar as the "Five Lucky Stars" concept and many of the same actors return in those latter films. However, the character names and indeed their roles differ: Stanley Fung's character is the nominal "leader" of the quintet in Winners & Sinners, whereas Hung's character takes the mantle in the latter films.

== Plot ==
Five prisoners - Teapot (Sammo Hung), Curly (John Sham), Exhaust Pipe (Richard Ng), Vaseline (Charlie Chin), and Rookie (Stanley Fung) meet in their cell to form a friendship. Rookie assumes the leadership of the group, whilst Teapot is bullied by the others (in the later films, Roundhead, played by Eric Tsang, is the group's victim and Hung's character is the leader). Following their release, they team up with Curly's beautiful sister, Shirley (Cherie Chung), and form a company called the Five Stars Cleaning Co. While most of the group attempt to vie for Shirley's affection, Teapot ultimately forms a relationship with her.

A sixth convict, the wealthy Jack Tar (James Tien), is released on the same day. Upon his release, he commences work on his next criminal project: trading counterfeit US and Hong Kong currency with an American crime boss. Jack sends his chauffeur to do the exchange at a skating competition, but the chauffeur's insecure attitude attracts the attention of two muggers. The muggers steal the briefcase containing the counterfeit US money and take off. Police officer CID 07 (Jackie Chan) attempts to recover the briefcase containing the phony money, but the case accidentally ends up in the Five Stars Cleaning Co. van. CID 07 continues his pursuit of the muggers, which results in a massive freeway pile-up.

Teapot and his friends are unaware of the mishap, and drive away with the case. The chauffeur informs Jack, who orders his men to search for them. Later, Jack hosts a party at his mansion. Teapot and his friends decide to gatecrash, hoping to expand their business with the wealthy guests. They successfully enter the mansion undetected, and while socializing with the other guests, Jack privately meets a Triad boss to discuss a new deal for the counterfeit plates. A bodyguard then realizes the Five Stars Cleaning Co. are there, and alerts Jack, who interrogates Curly. Curly insists he has no knowledge about the case, and the ensuing ruckus causes a physical confrontation between the friends and Jack's bodyguards. The friends narrowly escape, only to be kidnapped by the Triad boss, who secretly wants to cut off the deal with Jack and obtain the plates himself. He orders the friends to give up the case, and holds Shirley hostage. The friends return home and finally discover the case. When they leave to make the dropoff, however, Jack's men arrives. Teapot, Exhaust Pipe, and Vaseline engage them in battle, while Curly leaves to fetch the Triad boss and Rookie goes for help. The Triad boss and his bodyguards arrive, where Jack learns of his motives and turns the fight against him instead. The police arrive, led by Rookie, who reveals himself to be undercover. They arrest Jack and the Triad boss and their men and rewards the friends for their assistance.

== Cast ==
- Sammo Hung as Teapot (voiced by Lam Pou-chuen)
- John Shum as Curly / Jack So
- Richard Ng as Exhaust Pipe / Wind Pipe
- Charlie Chin as Vaseline (voiced Chu Chi-chung)
- Stanley Fung as Rookie / Ranks
- Cherie Chung as Shirley (voiced by Sim Siu-lan)
- Jackie Chan as CID 07 / Cop #7086 (voiced by Tang Wing-hung)
- James Tien as Jack Tar
- Cecilia Yip as Ceci (CID 07's Girlfriend)
- Yuen Biao as CID Agent
- Moon Lee as CID Agent’s Girlfriend
- Philip Chan as Inspector
- Mars as Robber
- Tai Bo as Chai
- Fung Hak-on as Pat
- Fung Ging-man as Angry Fisherman
- Paul Chang as Inspector
- Dick Wei as Henchman
- Wu Ma as Postman
- Chiu Chi-ling as Master Chiu

== Production ==
Sammo Hung got the idea for the film from an old TV show, in which a group of police officers from different backgrounds worked together, each displaying their own particular skills. By giving the characters humorous and disparate backgrounds, he hoped to make an entertaining film.

The film's Chinese title, Five Lucky Stars was chosen as it was evocative of the Seven Little Fortunes (aka "The Lucky Seven"). The Seven Little Fortunes was the name of the performance troupe that included Hung, Chan and Yuen, whilst they attended the Peking Opera School, The China Drama Academy, as children.

== Release ==
A dubbed version was released in the UK in the late 1980s, and later on VHS and DVD in Sweden, which omitted a karaoke sequence in the market stall (with the song performed being Young Turks by Rod Stewart). On 2 August 2004, DVD was released by Hong Kong Legends at the United Kingdom in Region 2.

== Awards and nominations ==
List of awards and nominations received by Winners and Sinners
Ceremony	Category	Nominee	Result
3rd Hong Kong Film Awards	Best Actor	Richard Ng	Nominated
3rd Hong Kong Film Awards	Best Action Choreography	Yuen Biao, Lam Ching-ying, Billy Chan	Won

== See also ==
- Jackie Chan filmography
- List of Hong Kong films
- Sammo Hung filmography
- Yuen Biao filmography
