= Richard Ng =

Hong Kong actor (1939–2023)

- 吳耀漢
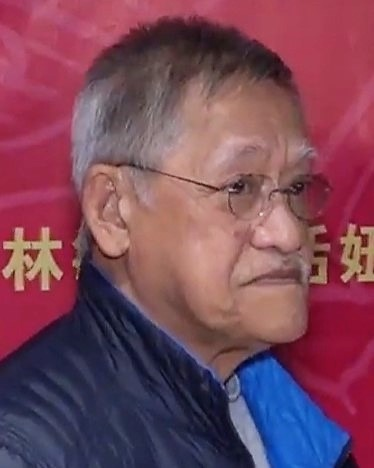
- Ng in 2018
- Born: 27 December 1939; Guangzhou, Guangdong, China
- Died: 9 April 2023 (aged 83); Hong Kong
- Citizenship: Hong Kong; United Kingdom
- Occupation: Actor
- Years active: 1976–2022
- Spouse: Susan Ng
- Children: 4, including Carl Ng

Chinese name
- Traditional Chinese: 吳耀漢
- Simplified Chinese: 吴耀汉
Transcriptions
Standard Mandarin
- Hanyu Pinyin: Wú Yàohàn
Yue: Cantonese
- Jyutping: Ng4 Yiu6-hon3
- Musical career
- Also known as: Richard Woo

Richard Ng Yiu-hon (27 December 1939 – 9 April 2023), also known as Richard Woo, was a Hong Kong-British actor known for playing comedic roles, particularly in Hong Kong films of the 1980s and 1990s.

== Film and television career ==
Ng appeared in 80 films. He was twice nominated for the Best Actor Award at the Hong Kong Film Awards, for his roles in Winners and Sinners and Beyond the Sunset. He worked alongside some of the biggest names in Hong Kong action cinema including Jackie Chan, Michelle Yeoh, Andy Lau, and Jet Li.

=== 1970s, 80s, and 90s ===
Ng's first role was in the 1976 Michael Hui comedy film The Private Eyes. It was the first of many films Ng would appear in with Sammo Hung throughout the next 30 years.

In 1979, Ng made his only film as director, Murder Most Foul. He also starred in the film and co-wrote it with Wong Jing.

In 1983, he appeared as "Exhaust Pipe" in Hung's film Winners and Sinners, a template to the Lucky Stars series. He would go on to appear in all of the subsequent Lucky Stars films throughout the 1980s, in fundamentally the same role, though his character name in the later films was "Sandy".

Ng came to the fore in all 4 of the Pom Pom series, alongside fellow Lucky Star, John Shum. The Pom Pom films were something of a spinoff from the Lucky Stars series, though more comedy than action-orientated. Sammo Hung worked as producer on the first three, and as action director on the first two, and all four films were released by Hung's production companies, Bo Ho Films and D&B Films. The first film, Pom Pom!, featured cameos from Sammo Hung, Charlie Chin and Stanley Fung as their characters from Winners and Sinners. Jackie Chan and Yuen Biao, who had also appeared in the Lucky Stars films also made cameo appearances. In the series, Ng plays "Ng Ah Chow" (or Ng Ah Chau), whilst Shum plays "Beethoven", a pair of inept and lovelorn cops. The first three Pom Pom films fared well at the domestic box office, taking between HK $17 and HK $20 million each, a sum comparable to contemporaries such as the original Lucky Stars trilogy, Chan's Project A and Hung and Biao's Zu Warriors from the Magic Mountain.

Ng became an established actor, and was given supporting roles in a number of popular Hong Kong action comedies including Wheels on Meals (1984), Millionaire's Express (1986) and Jackie Chan's Miracles (1989).

Throughout the 1990s he appeared in at least 8 further films with Sammo Hung, including Once Upon a Time in China and America.

=== 2000s: British TV, father & son films and Singaporean sitcoms and dramas ===
As of 1997, Ng moved from Hong Kong to London, England and was said to be semi-retired. However, he was clearly still very active, having made several appearances on British television since that time, and he also continued to work on Hong Kong films.

Since it started in 2002, Ng appeared in several episodes of the ongoing BBC Scotland soap, River City (under the name Richard Woo). His character was "Johnny Wu", the owner of the "Wok My World" takeaway.

In 2003, he appeared in the second Tomb Raider film, The Cradle of Life.

In 2004, he appeared in a deleted scene in an episode of Black Books. He also appeared in the commercial for the video game Mortal Kombat: Shaolin Monks.

Ng also appeared in an episode of The Bill in 2005, and an episode of the Nickelodeon UK series, Genie in the House in 2006.

In 2009, he played in Red Dwarf: Back to Earth as Swallow the Nose Maker, a maker of prosthetics.

Ng could be seen on British television, playing a shopkeeper in an advertisement for RAC, alongside Lennox Lewis, and in another advertisement for satellite television, dressed as an eskimo. He also played the emperor of China in a Channel 4 docu-drama, The Great Wall of China. It was first shown on 1 October 2007 at 9pm. In 2008, he appeared as Sifu Chien, the Shaolin master of Hong Kong policeman, Terry Phoo (Eddie Shin) in the pilot episode of the BBC Three program, Phoo Action.

In 2000, Ng appeared alongside his son, Carl Ng, in the film Love at First Sight a.k.a. Sausalito. The two have since appeared together several more times, including in Dante Lam's Jiang hu: The Triad Zone (2000), Lemon Crush (2002), Sammo Hung's Legend of the Dragon (2004) and the Jingle Ma film Happy Birthday (2007).

Ng and son would also appear together in three forthcoming films. The first of these is Magazine Gap Road, which is completed and due for release in 2007. This would be followed by Bodyguard: A New Beginning, and in 2008, Jessica Caught on Tape.

Ng would also make appearances as a supporting character in the Singaporean sitcom known as Under One Roof (1999-2001) only in Seasons 5 and 6 and also star in the dramas known as Brothers 4 (2003) and Silver Lining (2010).

Ng had a cameo appearance in the 2016 film Skiptrace.

== Personal life and death ==
Ng was educated in London, England whilst moving from Hong Kong to London in 1997.

Ng was married to his wife, Susan, a British woman who was a stylist for Vidal Sassoon in London and New York. She ran Hair by Susan, where she worked as Bruce Lee's hair stylist in the 1970s. Together, they had four children: live event producer Alex Ng; Zoe Ng, a professional dancer; Louise Ng who is a professional photographer; and actor Carl Ng.

Ng died at the age of 83. He had been suffering health problems for years. In 2019, he disclosed he had to undergo dialysis treatments daily due to kidney problems. In 2021, he told media that he had undergone surgery for a cardiac embolism.

== Filmography ==
- Golden Needles (神奇奪命計) (1975) - Lin To's man
- The Private Eyes (半斤八兩) (1976) - Police Officer
- The Pilferer's Progress (發錢寒) (1977) - Dragon Ng
- Murder Most Foul (慌失失) (1979, director and co-writer)
- Itchy Fingers (神偷妙探手多多) (1979) - Tiny
- Carry On Pickpocket (提防小手) (1982) - Wu
- It Takes Two (難兄難弟) (1982)
- The Return of the Condor Heroes (1983, TV Series) - Luk Koon Ying
- Winners and Sinners (奇謀妙計五福星) (a.k.a. 5 Lucky Stars) (1983) - Exhaust Pipe
- Wheels on Meals (快餐車) (a.k.a. Million Dollar Heiress) (1984) - Brilliant Patient
- Heaven Can Help (上天救命) (1984) - Chan Siu-Ming
- Pom Pom (神勇雙響炮) (1984) - Chau / Walker
- The Return of Pom Pom (雙龍出海) (1984) - Chau
- My Lucky Stars (福星高照) (a.k.a. Lucky Stars Superior Shine) (1985) - Sandy
- Mr. Boo Meets Pom Pom (智勇三寶) (1985) - Chau
- Twinkle, Twinkle Lucky Stars (夏日福星) (1985) - Sandy
- Yes, Madam (皇家師姐) (a.k.a. Police Assassins) (1985) - Old Master's Roommate
- The S.I.B. Files (1986, TV Series)
- Lucky Stars Go Places (最佳福星) (a.k.a. The Luckiest Stars) (1986) - Sandy
- Pom Pom Strikes Back (雙龍吐珠) (1986) - Chau
- From Here to Prosperity (奪寶計上計) (1986)
- Millionaire's Express (富貴列車) (a.k.a. Shanghai Express) (1986) - Han
- The Wrong Couples (不是冤家不聚頭) (1987)
- Mr. Vampire 3 (靈幻先生) (1987) - Mao Ming
- Mr. Handsome (美男子) (1987) - Dr. Richard Chow
- My Cousin, the Ghost (表哥到) (1987) - Cousin Ng Dut Dai
- Magnificent Warriors (中華戰士) (a.k.a. Yes, Madam 3 a.k.a. Dynamite Fighters) (1987) - Paulina Wong
- The Haunted Island (鬼猛腳) (a.k.a. Spooky, Spooky) (1988) - East Bay Station Commander
- Mistaken Identity (烏龍賊替身) (1988) - Cheung Kan-Sing
- Gaston en Leo in Hong Kong (Belgian film, 1988) - Agent 008
- King of Stanley Market (褲甲天下) (1988)
- Golden Swallow (金燕子) (1988) - Hsiang Yu
- Yes, Madam 2 (皇家師姐 III 雌雄大盜) (a.k.a. In the Line of Duty Part 3 a.k.a. Force of the Dragon) (1988) - Neddy the Ninja
- Keep on Dancing (繼續跳舞) (1988)
- Faithfully Yours (最佳女婿) (1988) - Ying's Father
- Miracles (奇蹟) a.k.a. Mr. Canton and Lady Rose (1989) - Captain Ho
- Run, Don't Walk (老虎出監) (1989) - Ng Shing-Choi
- Beyond the Sunset (飛越黃昏) (1989) - Wong
- Excuse Me, Please! (猛鬼山墳) (1989) - Cock
- Unfaithfully Yours (花心三劍俠) (1989)
- Return of the Lucky Stars (福星闖江湖) (1989) - Tai-Shan
- Mr. Sunshine (開心巨無霸) (1989)
- Demon Intruder (夜魔先生) (a.k.a. The Nocturnal Demon) (1990) - Cab Driver
- Family Honour (無名家族) (1990) - Ming's Husband
- Red Dust (滾滾紅塵) (1990) - Yu
- License to Steal (龍鳳賊捉賊) (1990) - No. 1 (Inspector Tam)
- Till Death Shall We Start (衰鬼撬牆腳) (1990)
- Slickers vs. Killers (黐線枕邊人) (1991) - Chow
- Ghost Punting (五福星撞鬼) (1991) - Da Shan-Di
- The Gambling Ghost (洪福齊天) (1991) - Roadblock Cop
- Son on the Run (帶子洪郎) (1991)
- The Banquet (豪門夜宴) (a.k.a. Party of a Wealthy Family) (1991) - Siu-Chi's Father
- Handsome Siblings (絕代雙驕) (1992)
- Banana Spirit (精靈變) (1992) - Tang
- Saviour of the Soul II (九二神鵰之痴心情長劍) (1992) - Devil King
- Boys Are Easy (追男仔) (1993) - Ching Sing
- Kung Fu Cult Master (倚天屠龍記之魔教教主) (a.k.a. Evil Cult a.k.a. Lord of the Wu Tang a.k.a. Kung Fu Master) (1993) - King of Green Bat: Wai Yat Siu
- Future Cops (超級學校霸王) (1993) - Uncle Richard Yu/Green Wolf/Blanka
- Perfect Couples (皆大歡喜) (1993)
- Mack the Knife 流氓醫生 (1995) (a.k.a. Dr. Mack) (1995) - Professor Bao
- Don't Give a Damn (方面俾) (a.k.a. Burger Cop) (1995) - Old Bluffer on Bus
- Once in a Lifetime (終身大事) (1995)
- Heaven Can't Wait (救世神棍) (1995) - Taoist
- Whatever Will Be, Will Be (仙樂飄飄) (1995) - Wing's Dad
- How to Meet the Lucky Stars (運財五福星) (1996) - Dee
- Ah Kam (阿金) (1996) - Detective
- Once Upon a Time in China and America (黃飛鴻之西域雄獅) (1997) - Han
- Hong Kong Night Club (香港大夜總會) (1997) - Yu Ten-sen
- Under One Roof (同在屋簷下) (1999-2001, TV Series) - Bobby Chow
- Sausalito (一見鍾情) (a.k.a. Love at First Sight) (2000)
- Jiang hu: The Triad Zone (江湖告急) (2000)
- The Monkey King (a.k.a. The Lost Empire) (2001, TV Series) - Communist Official
- Beijing Rocks (北京樂與路) (2001) - Wu De-hui
- Lemon Crush (2002)
- My Wife Is 18 (我老婆唔夠秤) (2002)
- My Dream Girl (炮製女朋友) (2003) - Cheung Tin
- Lara Croft Tomb Raider: The Cradle of Life (2003) - buyer (as Richard Woo)
- Brothers 4 (2003, TV series) - Chung Fu
- Legend of the Dragon (龍威父子) (2004)
- Mr. 3 Minutes (3分鐘先生) (2006) - Chung Gai-cheung
- Happy Birthday (生日快樂) (2007) - Xiao Mi's Dad
- Phoo Action (2008, TV Series) - Sifu Chien
- Red Dwarf: Back to Earth (2009, TV Series) - The Nose Maker
- Here Comes Fortune (財神到) (2010)
- Silver Lining (2010, TV Series) - Peter Gan
- Flirting Scholar 2 (2010)
- Detective Dee and the Mystery of the Phantom Flame (2010)
- Perfect Wedding (2010)
- Men Suddenly in Love (2011)
- The Fortune Buddies (2011)
- Supercapitalist (2012) - Donald Chang
- Rigor Mortis (2013) - Uncle Tung
- Little Big Master (2015)
- Lost in Hong Kong (2015)
- Skiptrace (2016)
- 100 Days Of Love (閃婚100天) (2017, TV Series)
- Vampire Cleanup Department (救僵清道夫) (2017)
- 20:16 (2017)
- Bio Raiders (2017)
- Crazy This Year (2018)
- Hotel Soul Good (2018)
- Dearest Anita (2019)
- A Lifetime Treasure (2019)
- The Invincible Dragon (2019)
- Walk with Me (2019)
- Go Back to China (2019)
- All's Well End's Well 2020 (2020) - cameo
- Where the Wind Blows (2023) - filmed in 2017
