= Twinkle, Twinkle, Lucky Stars =

1985 Hong Kong film by Sammo Hung

- Theatrical release poster

Chinese name
- Traditional Chinese: 夏日福星
- Simplified Chinese: 夏日福星
Transcriptions
Standard Mandarin
- Hanyu Pinyin: Xià Rì Fú Xīng
Yue: Cantonese
- Jyutping: Ha6 Jat6 Fuk1 Sing1
- Directed by: Sammo Hung
- Screenplay by: Barry Wong
- Story by: Lo Kin; Barry Wong; Roy Szeto
- Produced by: Eric Tsang
- Starring: Sammo Hung; Jackie Chan; Yuen Biao
- Cinematography: Arthur Wong; Johnny Koo
- Edited by: Peter Cheung
- Music by: Anders Nelsson
- Production companies: Golden Harvest; Bojon Films Company; Paragon Films
- Distributed by: Golden Harvest
- Release date: 15 August 1985
- Running time: 90 minutes
- Country: Hong Kong
- Language: Cantonese
- Box office: HK$28,911,851

Twinkle, Twinkle, Lucky Stars (Chinese: 夏日福星) is a 1985 Hong Kong action comedy film starring and directed by Sammo Hung. The film co-stars Jackie Chan and Yuen Biao. It is the third installment in the Lucky Stars series, following Winners and Sinners (1983) and My Lucky Stars (1985). Twinkle, Twinkle, Lucky Stars was released theatrically in Hong Kong on 15 August 1985.

== Plot ==
The Five Lucky Stars, one of them being replaced by a younger brother, are assigned by the police to allow an actress to live with them. The actress has information on a crime syndicate and assassins are sent after her. Ricky and Swordflower are to stay at the actress’s home undercover to capture the assassins.

Throughout the course of the movie, the Stars chase the attractive woman around the house, though their efforts are largely unsuccessful. At the climax, the three assassins eventually end up at a recreation building to take down Swordflower (mistaking her to be their target), but coincidentally Kidstuff and his friends are there and they recognize one of them, with help from the actress. Muscle and Ricky arrive in the nick of time and a showdown takes place, eventually ending with the protagonists victorious. The police and a large ensemble of Chinese actors arrive to congratulate them.

== Cast ==
- Sammo Hung as Kidstuff / Fastbuck
- Jackie Chan as Muscles
- Yuen Biao as Ricky Fung
- Eric Tsang as Roundhead
- Richard Ng as Sandy
- Stanley Fung as Rawhide
- Michael Miu as Pagoda
- Rosamund Kwan as Wang Yi-ching
- Sibelle Hu as Woo Ba-wah
- John Shum as Wormgrass
- James Tien as Lau
- Andy Lau as Associate of Muscles
- Anthony Chan as Lotta
- Sandra Ng as Tour Girl
- Kara Hui as Tour Girl
- Season Ma as Tour Girl
- Chung Fat as Assassin with Moustache
- Richard Norton as Caucasian Assassin
- Yasuaki Kurata as Japanese Assassin
- Charlie Chin as Herb
- Cho Tat Wah as Tsao
- Michelle Yeoh as Judo Teacher
- Wu Ma as Black Magic Teacher
- Billy Lau as Play Director
- Dick Wei as Thug
- Phillip Ko as Thug
- Lau Kar-wing as Thug
- Lee Hoi-sang as Thug
- Melvin Wong as Ma

== Theme song ==
- Song: Summer Lucky Stars (夏日福星)
  - Singer: Kenny Bee
  - Composer: Kenny Bee
  - Lyricist: Lo Wing Keung

== Release ==
Twinkle, Twinkle, Lucky Stars was released in Hong Kong on 15 August 1985, and was also released in the Philippines as Dragon Mission on 6 May 1987.

=== Box office ===
The film grossed HK $28,911,851 at the Hong Kong box office.

== Home media ==
On 30 June 2003, DVD was released by Hong Kong Legends at the United Kingdom in Region 2.

On 22 March 2021, the UK boutique film label, Eureka Video, released Twinkle, Twinkle Little Stars as part of the Lucky Stars trilogy collection on Blu Ray. The set includes remastered versions of Winners and Sinners (1983), My Lucky Stars (1985) in addition to the aforementioned Twinkle, Twinkle, Lucky Stars (1985).

The film was released on Blu-ray as part of the Shout! Factory title The Jackie Chan Collection: Volume 2 in 2023.

== See also ==
- Jackie Chan filmography
- Andy Lau filmography
- List of Hong Kong films of 1985
- List of Hong Kong films
- Sammo Hung filmography
- Yuen Biao filmography
