= My Lucky Stars =

1985 Hong Kong film by Sammo Hung

- Theatrical release poster
- Traditional Chinese: 福星高照
- Simplified Chinese: 福星高照
- Hanyu Pinyin: Fú Xīng Gáo Zhào
- Jyutping: Fuk1 Sing1 Gou1 Ziu3
- Directed by: Sammo Hung
- Screenplay by: Barry Wong
- Story by: Lo Kin; Barry Wong; Cheuk-Hon Szeto
- Produced by: Leonard Ho
- Starring: Sammo Hung; Jackie Chan; Yuen Biao; Eric Tsang; Richard Ng; Charlie Chin; Stanley Fung; Sibelle Hu
- Cinematography: Arthur Wong
- Edited by: Joseph Chiang; Peter Cheung
- Music by: Michael Lai
- Distributed by: Golden Harvest; Media Asia
- Release date: 10 February 1985
- Running time: 96 minutes
- Country: Hong Kong
- Language: Cantonese
- Box office: HK$30,748,643

My Lucky Stars (Chinese: 福星高照) is a 1985 Hong Kong action comedy film starring and directed by Sammo Hung. The film was written by Barry Wong, and produced by Leonard Ho. The film co-stars Jackie Chan, Yuen Biao, Sibelle Hu, Richard Ng, Charlie Chin, Eric Tsang, and Stanley Fung. It was released as 5 Lucky Stars in Japan and as Ninja Encounter in the Philippines. My Lucky Stars is the second film in the Lucky Stars series, and a semi-sequel to Winners and Sinners, with many of the same actors returning as the "Five Lucky Stars" troupe, albeit with different character names and slightly different roles.

== Plot summary ==
Undercover cop Muscles (Jackie Chan) enlists his childhood friends, the "Five Lucky Stars", to travel to Japan to help him catch a yakuza group.

A corrupt Hong Kong cop (Lam Ching Ying) flees to Tokyo to join his fellow mobsters, whose headquarters are secretly built under an amusement park (filmed in Fuji-Q Highland). Two loyal cops, Ricky (Yuen Biao) and Muscles (Jackie Chan), travel there to apprehend him and uncover the mobsters’ lair, but Ricky is kidnapped in a fight.

Muscles goes into hiding and calls his supervisor to send help; since the mobsters already have information on the officers of the Hong Kong Royal Police Force, Muscles asks his supervisor to send his orphanage friends, nicknamed the Five Lucky Stars, over to assist. The supervisor agrees and collects the five friends, who are all either petty criminals or low-wage workers. They refuse to aid the police, but the supervisor cunningly sets up a false story in the media that accuses the five of robbing a bank of millions of dollars, blackmailing them into helping. They ultimately agree when the supervisor teams them up with a rookie policewoman, Swordflower, who becomes an object of lustful target to the five.

The group travels to Tokyo and that night, Kidstuff (Sammo Hung), the Stars' most rational and talented member, and Swordflower go to Muscles’ apartment. After defeating some thugs, Muscles reunites with Kidstuff. The operation is to send phony money to the mobsters to allow the five to enter their lair, and that way they can get closer to freeing Ricky and apprehending the criminals. After a prolonged battle at the bowels of the amusement park, the criminals lose and the Lucky Stars receive a place to live back at Hong Kong as their reward.

== Cast ==
Despite being billed as one of the stars, Jackie Chan's role in the film is relatively minor until the final half hour. The major star of the film is Chan's longtime associate and former member of the Peking Opera School, Sammo Hung. The film also features another of that troupe, Yuen Biao.

In the first film, Winners and Sinners, Stanley Fung played an undercover policeman who was posing as the leader of the Lucky Stars gang. In My Lucky Stars and the third film, Twinkle, Twinkle Lucky Stars, Hung's character is the nominal leader, and Fung's character is not a cop.

John Shum ("Curly" in Winners and Sinners) was notably absent from the gang in this film, due to his commitments as a political activist. He is replaced in this film by Eric Tsang.

As with Heart of Dragon, Sammo Hung's real-life brother makes a cameo appearance as a henchman.

- Sammo Hung - "Eric" / "Kidstuff" / "Fastbuck" / "Chi Koo Choi"
- Sibelle Hu - "Barbara Woo" / "Swordflower" / "Ba Wong Fa"
- Richard Ng - "Sandy" / "Dee"/ "Dai Sang Dei"
- Charlie Chin - "Herb" (as Charlie Ching) "American Ginseng"/"Fa Kei Sam"
- Eric Tsang - "Roundhead" / "Buddha Fruit" / "Lo Hon Gwo"
- Stanley Fung - "Rawhide" / "Rhinohide" / "Sai Ngau Pei"
- Jackie Chan - "Muscles"
- Yuen Biao - "Ricky Fung"
- Michiko Nishiwaki - Japanese Gang fighter
- Cho Tat-wah - "Supt. Walter Tsao"
- Paul Chang - Gang Chief
- Dick Wei - gang member
- Lam Ching-ying - gang member / Renegade Cop
- Lau Kar-wing - gang member
- James Tien - Parole Officer
- Teresa Ha - Ping
- Huang Ha - Prisoner No. 6377 (uncredited)
- Tai San - Prisoner
- San Kuai - Prisoner No. 5734
- Bolo Yeung - Millionaire Chan (uncredited)
- Miyuki Ono - Millionaire Chan's secretary
- Alice Lau - Millionaire Chan's wife
- Ho Kai-law - Dentist
- Fruit Chan - Card Player
- Dick Tso - Card Player
- Billy Lau - Mental patient on Bench
- Lau Chau-sang - Bus Driver with Funny Hair
- Yu Chi-ming - Man with Funny Hair
- Chu Tau - Bus Driver with Funny Hair
- Teddy Yip Wing-cho - Mental Patient with Sandy
- Yuen Miu - Amusement Park Ninja
- Chow Kam-kong - Gang Thug
- Johnny Cheung - Gang Thug
- Yuen Wah - Gang Thug (uncredited)
- Lee Chi-kit - Gang Thug
- Chin Kar-lok - Gang Thug / Masked Ninja at Muscles' home
- Siu Tak-foo - Gang Thug
- Chow Kong - Gang Thug (uncredited)
- Pang Yun-cheung - Gang Thug
- Wellson Chin - Dumb Gang Thug
- Wong Kim-ban
- Lung Ying
- Wu Ma
- Tau Cheung-yeung
- Ng Hoi-ti

== Box office ==
During its Hong Kong theatrical run, My Lucky Stars grossed HK $30,748,643. It was the first film to pass the HK $30 million mark in Hong Kong, surpassing Aces Go Places 3 as the highest-grossing film in Hong Kong.

== Accolades ==
- 1986 Hong Kong Film Awards
  - Nomination: Best Action Choreography (Yuen Biao, Lam Ching-ying)

== Home media ==
On 23 September 2002, DVD was released by Hong Kong Legends at UK in Region 2.

== See also ==
- Jackie Chan filmography
- Sammo Hung filmography
- Yuen Biao filmography
