= The Return of Pom Pom =

1984 Hong Kong film by Philip Chan

- Theatrical release poster
- Traditional Chinese: 雙龍出海
- Jyutping: soeng1 lung4 ceot1 hoi2
- Directed by: Philip Chan
- Written by: Jo Chan
- Produced by: Sammo Hung
- Starring: Richard Ng; John Shum
- Cinematography: Ricky Lau
- Edited by: Peter Cheung
- Music by: Joseph Chan; Sam Hui
- Production companies: D & B Films
- Release date: 22 June 1984
- Running time: 83 minutes
- Country: Hong Kong
- Language: Cantonese
- Box office: HK$18,455,255.00

The Return of Pom Pom (Chinese: 雙龍出海) is a 1984 Hong Kong comedy film directed by Philip Chan and starring Richard Ng and John Shum. It is the second film in the Pom Pom film series which is a spin-off the Lucky Stars series.

== Plot ==
Having been together for years, police officer Beethoven (John Shum) must find a new place to live as his friend and fellow officer Ng Ah-chiu (Richard Ng) is marrying his fiancée Anna (Deanie Yip). Furthermore, the two officers are transferred to a new department run by fearsome Inspector Tien (James Tien). While here their former boss inspector Chan (Philip Chan) is set up after evidence is stolen by "The Flying Spider" (Lam Ching-ying), the two officers must track down the thief to prove Chan's innocence.

== Cast ==
- Richard Ng as Officer Ng Ah-chiu
- John Shum as Officer Beethoven
- Deannie Yip as Anna, Ng's love interest
- Lam Ching-ying as The Flying Spider
- Philip Chan as Inspector Chan
- James Tien as Inspector Tien
