= Return of the Lucky Stars =

1989 Hong Kong film by Stanley Fung

- Film poster
- Traditional Chinese: 福星闖江湖
- Simplified Chinese: 福星闯江湖
- Hanyu Pinyin: Fú Xīng Chuǎng Jiāng Hú
- Jyutping: Fuk1 Sing1 Cong2 Gong1 Wu4
- Directed by: Stanley Fung
- Written by: Wong Jing; Stanley Fung
- Produced by: Wallace Cheung
- Starring: Stanley Fung; Michael Miu; Richard Ng; Eric Tsang
- Cinematography: David Choi
- Edited by: Robert Choi
- Music by: Sherman Chow
- Release date: 28 April 1989
- Running time: Movie Impact; Media Asia
- Country: Hong Kong
- Languages: Cantonese; English
- Box office: HK $6,781,219

Return of the Lucky Stars (alternative: Lucky Stars Triad Society) is a 1989 Hong Kong action comedy film directed by Stanley Fung. It is the fifth film out of the Lucky Stars series.

== Plot ==
Hong Kong Police Chief Supt. Walter Tso arrests Big Dai, the reformed leader of a criminal corporation. When Dai asked his brother Richard Mao to turn himself into the police, he betrays him and decides to take over the corporation. Dai is imprisoned and an informant is murdered by one of Mao's men.

With no evidence against Mao and the corporation, Tso coerced four of the "Five Lucky Stars" to go undercover in the prison, rescue Dai, and help nab Mao and bring down the corporation.

== Cast ==
- Richard Ng - Sandy / Tai Shan
- Stanley Fung - Rawhide / Rhino Skin
- Michael Miu - Pagoda / Cone / Ginseng
- Eric Tsang - Roundhead / Lo Han
- Carina Lau - Banana Tso
- Lo Hoi-Pang - Big Dai
- Wong Ching - Richard Mao
- Joan Tong - Mina
- Cho Tat Wah - Chief Supt. Walter Tso
- Natalis Chan - Inspector Chan
- Kent Cheng - Inspector Cheng
- Wong Jing - Inspector Wong
- Lee Ka-Ting - Ting
- Kenneth Tsang - Uncle Kin
- Fung Ging-Man - Uncle Man
- Benz Hui - Hung
- Yu Kwok-Lok - Boss of Lok Gymnastic
- Elsie Chan - Wife of Lok Gymnastic's boss
- Sing Fu On - Mao's thug
- Wellson Chin - Mao's thug
- Ridley Tsui - Mao's thug
- Lau Kar-wing - Prisoner
- James Ha - Prisoner
- Frankie Chan - Prisoner
- Ng Kwok-Kin - Cop
- Cynthia Rothrock - Lisa (unconfirmed)
