= To Hell with the Devil (film) =

1982 Hong Kong film by John Woo

- Film poster
- 摩登天師
- Directed by: John Woo
- Written by: John Woo; Szeto Cheuk-Hon; Shu Kei
- Produced by: Raymond Chow (executive producer); Louis Sit
- Starring: Ricky Hui
- Cinematography: Bill Wong Chung-Piu
- Edited by: Peter Cheung Yiu-Chung
- Music by: Tang Siu-Lam
- Production company: Golden Harvest Productions
- Release date: 8 April 1982 (Hong Kong)
- Running time: 88 minutes
- Country: Hong Kong
- Language: Cantonese
- Box office: HK$4,464,333

To Hell with the Devil (Chinese: 摩登天師; Jyutping: mo1 dang1 tin1 si1) is a 1982 Hong Kong comedy horror film directed by John Woo.

== Plot ==
After being fired for not adhering strictly enough to church conventions, Reverend Ma dies in an accident and goes to purgatory on his way to Heaven, where he encounters the thief Flit who is on his way to Hell. Reverend Ma is sent back to Earth to live for another 36 years, while Flit is sent back to gather more souls. The two battle each other over the soul of a struggling musician named Bruce Lee. His crush Peggy gets mad at him for ruining her audition with pop star Rocky, and Peggy's mother won't let him propose to her because he is not rich.

Rocky's agent steals a song Bruce Lee has written (but not registered with the copyright office) and Rocky records it first. Bruce Lee signs his soul over to Flit in exchange for three wishes. His first wish is to be famous for singing his own song and to have Peggy love him alone. His recording of his song outsells Rocky's, but Peggy feels trapped and leaves him. Bruce Lee uses his next wish to make Peggy perfectly obedient, but she also obeys orders spoken by others, leading to problems for Bruce Lee. His final wish is to give up everything and live a simple life with Peggy. Over the years, their poverty forces Peggy to unhappily give their children up for adoption. Bruce Lee goes back to Flit, who takes back the wishes and returns him to his old life.

Bruce Lee attempts to kill Rocky but fails to do so, then begs Flit to cancel the contract. Flit attempts to sacrifice him, but Reverend Ma battles with Flit until they destroy each other. Bruce Lee tears up the contract and marries Peggy, while Flit and Reverend Ma continue to battle as angels in Heaven.

== Cast ==
- Ricky Hui as Bruce Lee
- Jade Hsu as Peggy
- Stanley Fung as Flit
- Paul Chun Pui as Reverend Ma
- Nat Chan Pak-Cheung as Rocky
- Chung Fat as The Devil (cameo)
- Yuen Miu as Man chasing money
- John Shum Kin-Fun as Mr Fong (cameo)
- John Ladalski as Tourist
- Lee Wan-Lung
- Huang Man as Peggy's mother
- Amy Wu Mei-Yee as Pregnant actress in soap opera
- Law Lai-Kuen
- Yeung Yau-Cheung as Henpecked man at restaurant
- Leung Git-Fong as Strict woman
- Lau Chun as Waiter
- Ling Fung as Priest

== Production ==
In an interview in the book John Woo: The Films by Robert K. Elder, Woo recalled, "At this time, I tried to finish the contract with Golden Harvest and they wouldn't let me go because I had another three years with them. So I put that emotion, I put that idea into the movie. It's a young guy who would sell his soul to the devil, a trade for three wishes. But somehow, his [situation] got worse and worse. At the end of the movie he yelled at the devil and said, 'I want my contract back! I just want to end it!' and that was how I used to yell at my boss at the studio. I wanted to throw it out."

== Release ==
The film was released theatrically in Hong Kong on 8 April 1982, earning HK$4,464,333.

== Reception ==
Jeremy Carr of Senses of Cinema wrote called the film "a strange, allusion-heavy amalgam of horror and comedy".

In his book Ten Thousand Bullets: The Cinematic Journey of John Woo, author Christopher Heard wrote that the film resembles "both 'Faust' by Goethe and the Dudley Moore/Peter Cook Faustian send-up Bedazzled (1967)."

Reviewer Kenneth Brorsson of sogoodreviews.com wrote, "Not the first or last time John Woo featured religious imagery but no other movie of his has proven to be as weird in that regard as To Hell With The Devil. Unfortunately it's again proved though that Ricky Hui sans his fellow brothers, and under the direction of Woo, isn't exactly prime comedic material. The comedy designed around pratfalls of the severely low class kind shows Woo was perhaps still a bit too infatuated with his work on Laughing Times".

An essay in the book Golden Harvest: Leading Change in Changing Times states, "To Hell with the Devil, an allegory of the loss of the soul for fame and gains of the modern man, brings to mind the Faustian story."

The website The 14 Amazons gave the film a rating of 1/2 out of 5 stars, writing, "The movie is clearly a Hong Kong comedy, of the sort that doesn't tend to travel well... there's lots of slapstick and physical humour, little of which makes a favourable impression. Mind you, I don't think local audiences had much time for it either, so perhaps it's not a HK thing, just a lousy thing. There's a few good moments - mainly the bizarre climactic battle, but for most of the movie I was watching the time and wondering when it would all end."

Author Karen Fang of Five Flavours wrote, "Many comedic elements in Woo's films are characterized by a seemingly incoherent blend of easily digestible action scenes and culturally relevant humor. 'To Hell with the Devil' (1981), for example, is a supernatural parody of the struggle for the human soul, featuring battle sequences between good and evil angels styled like a video game."

In the book The Rough Guide to Horror Movies, author Alan Jones called the film "John Woo's satanic pact farce" and argued that it was one of many "cash-ins" on the success of Sammo Hung's Spooky Encounters (1980).

The review on serp.media calls the film "a unique blend of comedy, fantasy, and horror that takes the viewer on a rollercoaster ride of excitement and suspense."

The website onderhond.com gave the film a rating of 3 out of 5 stars.
