= Lucky Stars =

Hong Kong action film series

- Screenshot from Twinkle, Twinkle Lucky Stars (l-r: Sammo Hung, Michael Miu, Richard Ng, Stanley Fung & Eric Tsang)
- Traditional Chinese: 福星系列
- Simplified Chinese: 福星系列
- Hanyu Pinyin: Fú Xīng Xì Liè
- Jyutping: Fuk1 Sing1 Hai6 Lit6
- Directed by: Sammo Hung; Eric Tsang; Stanley Fung; Corey Yuen; Chang Chi Wai; Ricky Lau; Frankie Chan
- Written by: Sammo Hung; Barry Wong; Szeto Cheuk Hon; Lo Kin; Anthony Chan; Lee Chi Wai; Lee Ping Kwong; Ivy Lee
- Produced by: Sammo Hung; Raymond Chow; Leonard Ho; Eric Tsang; Wallace Cheung; Teddy Yip
- Starring: Sammo Hung; Eric Tsang; Stanley Fung; Richard Ng; Charlie Chin; John Shum; Michael Miu; Jackie Chan; Yuen Biao; Sibelle Hu; Kent Cheng; Cho Tat Wah; Cherie Chung; Andy Lau; Alan Tam; Anthony Chan; James Tien; Karl Maka; Sylvia Chang; Françoise Yip; Mars; Dick Wei; Lau Kar-wing; Phillip Ko
- Cinematography: Ricky Lau; Artur Wong; Peter Ngor; Johnny Koo; Lam Lai Hing; Cheung Shing Tung; David Choi; Jimmy Leung; Chan Yuen Kai; Sung Kong; Ng Wai Kit; Venus Keung; Fletcher Poon
- Edited by: Peter Cheung; Keung Chuen Tak; Robert Choi; Hai Kit Wai; Jelly Mak
- Music by: Frankie Chan; Chris Babida; Michael Lai; Tang Siu Lam; Anders Nelsson; Violet Lam; Sherman Chow; Roel A. Garcia
- Production companies: Golden Harvest; Paragon Films Ltd. Bo Ho Film Company Ltd. Children's Town Ltd. Bojon Films; Choice Film Productions Co., Ltd. Grand March Movie Production Co., Ltd.
- Distributed by: Golden Harvest; Media Asia; Newport Entertainment Ltd. Movie Impact Ltd.
- Running time: 692 minutes
- Country: Hong Kong
- Language: Cantonese
- Box office: HK$121,890,054 (Hong Kong)

Lucky Stars (or Five Lucky Stars); (Chinese: 福星系列、五福星) was a Hong Kong action comedy film series in the 1980s and 1990s, blending Chinese martial arts with bawdy comedy. The films featured an ensemble cast, with many of the actors appearing in successive films.

The characters of the Five Lucky Stars were originally petty criminals recently out of prison, who started their own cleaning company. By the second film, the cleaning company idea was discarded, and the bumbling gang were instead employed to assist the police.

== The original trilogy ==
The first three films were the most successful, directed by and starring Sammo Hung as "Kidstuff", one of the gang of Lucky Stars, and featuring supporting roles and cameos from a variety of Hong Kong film stars, notably his Peking Opera School "brothers", Jackie Chan and Yuen Biao, as well as stars such as Andy Lau, Michelle Yeoh and Rosamund Kwan.

The first film was Winners and Sinners (1983). The Chinese title, Five Lucky Stars, was chosen because it was evocative of the Seven Little Fortunes (a.k.a. "The Lucky Seven"), the performance troupe at the Peking Opera School "The China Drama Academy".

Hung got the idea for the plot from watching an old TV show, in which a group of police officers from different backgrounds worked together, each using their own particular skills. By giving the characters humorous and disparate backgrounds, he hoped to make an entertaining film.

The original quintet of Lucky Stars in Winners and Sinners consisted of Sammo Hung, Richard Ng, Charlie Chin, Stanley Fung and John Shum. In the second film, My Lucky Stars (1985), Shum was replaced by Eric Tsang. In the third film, Twinkle, Twinkle Lucky Stars (1985), Chin played a cameo wherein he handed over the reins to his Shaolin monk cousin, played by Michael Miu. Shum returned in a supporting role.

== The later films ==
Lucky Stars Go Places (1986) was a departure from the original trilogy, with Hung giving up directing duties to Eric Tsang. Prior to joining the Lucky Stars crew, Tsang had directed the first two films in the Aces Go Places series - Aces Go Places (1982) and Aces Go Places 2 (1983). Like the Lucky Stars films, they were successful action comedies with an ensemble cast. However, the plots were parodies of James Bond films and characters fought with guns more often rather than kung fu.

Lucky Stars Go Places was an attempt to combine the styles and characters of the two-film series'. Hung remained involved, producing the film and playing a supporting role, and other members of the original Lucky Stars gang made cameo appearances. However, the main roles were taken by other actors, a new group of "Lucky Stars" - notably including Andy Lau and Alan Tam. With fewer action scenes and a heavier reliance on comedy, the film was significantly different from its predecessors.

Stanley Fung co-directed the fifth film, Return of the Lucky Stars (1989), with Chu Shek-Tsan, and co-wrote it with Wong Jing. He also starred in the film alongside Richard Ng and Eric Tsang, as well as the returning Michael Miu.

The 6th film, Ghost Punting (1992) was a comedy ghost film was directed by and starred Sammo Hung, along with Richard Ng, Stanley Fung, Charlie Chin and Eric Tsang. Although featuring all 5 of the Lucky Stars actors from My Lucky Stars, the emphasis is more on comedy than action.

The final film, How to Meet the Lucky Stars (1996), saw the same four actors starring, although the film had a number of guest appearances, including Sammo Hung, Cheng Pei-pei, Chen Kuan Tai, Françoise Yip and Nora Miao. The film was released as a benefit film for the famous Hong Kong film director, Lo Wei, who died in 1996.

In several cases, the Lucky Stars films were not true sequels of one another. Rather they had themes and actors in common. Stars came and went, though Richard Ng and Stanley Fung appeared in all seven films, whilst Sammo Hung and Eric Tsang appeared in six. Other actors returned in small roles to help boost the sales of the films, including the big names of Jackie Chan, Yuen Biao and Andy Lau.

Additional actors in the series include Corey Yuen, Sibelle Hu, Mars, Sylvia Chang, Kent Cheng, Alan Tam, Dick Wei, Wu Ma, Yuen Wah and Bolo Yeung.

The series consists of:

- Winners and Sinners a.k.a. Five Lucky Stars and Intelligent Scheme Five Lucky Stars (1983)
- My Lucky Stars a.k.a. Five Lucky Stars 2 and Lucky Stars Superior Shine and Winners And Sinners 2 (1985)
- Twinkle, Twinkle Lucky Stars a.k.a. Five Lucky Stars 3 and Summer Time Lucky Stars and Winners And Sinners 3 (1985)
- Lucky Stars Go Places a.k.a. Five Lucky Stars 4 and The Luckiest Stars and Winners And Sinners 4 (1986)
- Return of the Lucky Stars a.k.a. Five Lucky Stars 5 and Lucky Stars Triad Society and Winners And Sinners 5 (1989)
- Ghost Punting a.k.a. Five Lucky Stars 6 and Lucky Stars Ghost Encounter and Winners And Sinners 6 (1992)
- How to Meet the Lucky Stars a.k.a. Five Lucky Stars 7 and Winners And Sinners 7 (1996)

== Spin-offs ==
=== Pom Pom ===
The Pom Pom series of Hong Kong comedy films is sometimes also included under the banner of "Lucky Stars films", primarily due to the series' sharing the stars, Richard Ng and John Shum. However the pair play official cops, rather than former criminals turned good. Sammo Hung worked as producer on the first three Pom Pom films, and as action director on the first two. All four films were released by Hung's production companies, Bo Ho Films and D&B Films. In Pom Pom (1984), Hung, along with Charlie Chin and Stanley Fung cameoed as their characters from My Lucky Stars, which was released the following year. Jackie Chan and Yuen Biao also made cameo appearances (as a motorcycle cop and truck driver respectively), and a number of their Hong Kong action film contemporaries also made appearances, including Deanie Yip, Lam Ching Ying, Philip Chan, Dick Wei and Wu Ma.

- Pom Pom (1984)
- The Return of Pom Pom (1984)
- Mr. Boo Meets Pom Pom (1985)
- Pom Pom Strikes Back (1986)

The Chinese title of Pom Pom (神勇雙響炮) translates as "Supernaturally brave artillery". The Chinese title of the 1986 Yuen Biao film Rosa (神勇雙響炮續集) translates as "Supernaturally brave artillery sequel". Despite this, Rosa is not a sequel to Pom Pom.

The 1992 Hong Kong action comedy film Pom Pom and Hot Hot starring Jacky Cheung and Stephen Tung is also not part of this series.

== See also ==
- Aces Go Places film series
