= Mr Boo =

Mr Boo may refer to:

- Majin Buu, a character from the Dragon Ball manga series created by Akira Toriyama
- Mr Boo, a character from 1970s British children's TV series Jamie and the Magic Torch
- Mr Boo, stagename of English circus clown Tom Bubu Endresz, brother and comic partner of Mooky the Clown at Blackpool Tower Circus.
- Mr Boo, lead character of Mr. Boo Meets Pom Pom, 1985 Hong Kong comedy film
