= Yuen Biao filmography =

The following is the filmography of Yuen Biao.

== Film ==
Year	Film title	Alternate	Role	Notes
1966	The Eighteen Darts (Part 1)	兩湖十八鏢 (上集)	child actor	Alternate title: Seven Little Tigers (Part 1)
1966	The Eighteen Darts (Part 2)	兩湖十八鏢 (下集)	child actor	Alternate title: Seven Little Tigers (Part 2)
1972	Fist of Fury	精武門	"Petrov's enemy" (uncredited) stuntman	Alternate title: The Chinese Connection
1972	Hapkido	合氣道	"Black Bear student" (supporting role) stuntman	Alternate title: Lady Kung Fu
1972	The Way of the Dragon	猛龍過江	"thug" supporting role stuntman	Alternate title: Return of the Dragon
1972	The Fourteen Amazons	十四女英豪	"Yang soldier" (supporting role)	
1973	Chinese Hercules	碼頭大決鬥	supporting role (extra)	Alternate title: Freedom Strikes a Blow
1973	The Rendezvous of Warriors	偷渡客	supporting role	
1973	Little Tiger of Canton	廣東小老虎	"pickpocket" (as Bill Yuen)	Alternate title: Cub Tiger from Kwang Tung and Ten Fingers of Death
1973	Death Blow	賊王	"Street Thug"	Alternate title: Thunderfist
1973	The Master of Kung Fu	黃飛鴻	"Wong's student"	
1973	Enter the Dragon	龍爭虎鬥	"Tournament Fighter" (uncredited) stuntman	
1973	Attack of the Kung Fu Girls	鐵娃	supporting role stuntman	Alternate title: None but the Brave
1973	Back Alley Princess	馬路小英雄	supporting role stuntman	
1973	Kickmaster	跆拳震九州	"Japanese" (extra)	Alternate titles: When Taekwondo Strikes and Sting of the Dragon Masters
1974	Super Kung Fu Kid	小霸王	(extra)	Alternate title: Karado: The Kung Fu Flash
1974	The Shrine of Ultimate Bliss	鐵金剛大破紫陽觀	"thug"	Alternate titles: The Stoner and Hong Kong Hitman
1974	Conman and the Kung Fu Kid	狼狽為奸	supporting role	Alternate titles: From China with Death and Dragons of Kung Fu
1974	Paris	巴黎殺手	supporting role	Alternate title: Paris Killers
1974	Virgins of the Seven Seas	洋妓	(extra)	Alternate titles: Enter the Seven Virgins and The Bod Squad
1974	The Tournament	中泰拳壇生死戰	"student"	
1975	Kung Fu Stars	脂粉大煞星	supporting role	
1975	The Boatman Fighters	海盜張保仔	supporting role	Alternate titles: Cheung Po Chai and The Brave Man
1975	The Big Showdown	猛虎鬥狂龍	supporting role	Alternate title: Kung Fu Massacre
1975	The Man from Hong Kong	直搗黃龍	supporting role (uncredited)	Alternate title: The Dragon Flies
1975	The Valiant Ones	忠烈圖	"1st Pirate in contest"	Alternate title: Usurpers of Emperor's Power
1976	Brotherhood	江湖子弟	"San He Tang's gangster"	
1976	Killer Clans	流星·蝴蝶·剑	supporting role	
1976	Hot Potato		supporting role	
1976	Secret Rivals	南拳北腿	"Russian student" assistant action choreographer	Alternate title: Silver Fox Rivals
1976	Challenge of the Masters	陸阿采與黃飛鴻	"Master Pang's student"	
1976	The Himalayan	密宗聖手	(extra)	
1976	Hand of Death	少林門	"assassin"	Alternate title: Countdown in Kung Fu
1976	The Magic Blade	天涯明月刀	(extra) stuntman	
1976	Shaolin Wooden Men	少林木人巷	"troublemaker at tavern" stuntman	Alternate title: Shaolin Chamber of Death
1977	To Kill a Jaguar	絕不低頭	"Mr Kam's thug" stuntman	
1977	The Fatal Flying Guillotines	陰陽血滴子	(extra)	
1977	Secret Rivals 2	南拳北腿鬥金狐	supporting role assistant action director assistant action choreographer stuntman	Alternate title: Silver Fox Rivals II
1977	Last Strike	被迫	supporting role Film was originally called Soul Brothers of Kung Fu	Alternate titles: Kung Fu Avengers and Tiger Strikes Again
1977	Broken Oath	破戒	"brothel guard / One of Qi's Men"	
1977	The Dragon, the Odds	戇居仔與牛咁眼	"Mo Lai Tao"	Alternate title: Crazy Boy and Pop-Eye
1977	Jade Tiger	白玉老虎	supporting role stuntman	
1977	Invincible Armour	鷹爪鐵布衫	supporting role assistant action director	
1977	Deadly Angels	俏探女嬌娃	(extra) stuntman	Alternate title: The Bod Squad
1977	Death Duel	三少爺的劍	"Spirit Catcher" stuntman	
1977	Shaolin Plot	四大門派	"School fighter"	
1977	Heroes of Shaolin	大武士與小票客	"sword and knife man" action director	Alternate title: Heroes of the Wild
1977	Snuff Bottle Connection	神腿鐵扇功	supporting role martial arts choreographer stuntman	
1978	My Kung Fu Master	師父教落	"stuntman on movie set"	
1978	The Amsterdam Kill	荷京喋血	supporting role	
1978	Dirty Tiger, Crazy Frog	老虎田雞	"casino fighter" stuntman	
1978	Warriors Two	贊先生與找錢華 (1978)	"Thunder Pai's man stuntman	
1978	Enter the Fat Dragon	肥龍過江	"thug in opening scene"	
1978	Flying Guillotine 2	清宮大刺殺	(extra)	Alternate title: Massive Brutal Massacre
1978	The Vengeful Beauty	血芙蓉	"Jin Ren Ting's man"	
1978	Swordsman and Enchantress	蕭十一郎	"Mrs Lian's bodyguard"	
1978	Game of Death	死亡遊戲	Biker in black jumpsuit action choreographer stuntman	
1978	Spiritual Kung Fu	拳精	"Master of the Five Fists" (uncredited) stuntman	Alternate title: Karate Ghostbuster
1978	Shaolin Connection	荷蘭賭人頭	supporting role	Alternate titles: Amsterdam Connection and Big Bad Bolo
1979	Magnificent Butcher	林世榮	"Leung Foon" assistant action director assistant action choreographer stuntman	
1979	Knockabout	雜家小子	"Yipao"	
1979	Odd Couple	搏命單刀奪命搶	stuntman assistant action director	
1979	The Incredible Kung Fu Master	醒目仔蠱惑招	action director	
1980	The Young Master	帥弟出馬	Sang Kung's son stuntman	Alternate title: The Dragon
1980	Game of Death II	死亡塔	Blue Staff Monk assistant action director stuntman	Alternate title as: Tower of Death
1980	Snake Deadly Act	蛇形醉步	supporting role	Alternate title: Snake Fist, Drunken Step
1980	The Victim	身不由已	Jo-Wing's cohort action director action choreographer stuntman	
1980	Encounters of the Spooky Kind	鬼打鬼	"Vampire" action director action choreographer stuntman	
1980	Two Toothless Tigers	甩牙老虎	action director	
1980	Bat Without Wings	無翼蝙蝠	supporting role	
1981	Dreadnaught	勇者無懼	"Mousy"	
1981	The Prodigal Son	敗家仔	"Leung Chang" action director assistant action director stuntman	
1982	Carry On Pickpocket	提防小手	man at bank(cameo) action director stuntman	
1982	The Dead and the Deadly	人嚇人	action director stuntman	
1982	Lovers Blades	神經大俠		
1983	Winners and Sinners	奇謀妙計五福星	"CID officer" action director action choreographer Act with Jackie Chan and Sammo Hung	Alternate titles: Five Lucky Stars and Intelligent Scheme Five Lucky Stars
1983	Project A	A計劃	"inspector Hong Tin-tsu " stuntman	Alternate title: Pirate Patrol
1983	The Champions	波牛	"Lee Tong"	
1983	Zu Warriors from the Magic Mountain	新蜀山劍俠	"Ti Ming-chi / Dik Ming-kei" action director action choreographer	
1984	Pom Pom	神勇雙響炮	"garbage truck driver" (cameo)	
1984	Wheels on Meals	快餐車	"David" stuntman film called original Spanish Connection	Alternate titles: Spartan X and Million Dollar Heiress
1984	Treasure Hunters	龍虎少爺	action director	
1985	My Lucky Stars	福星高照	"Ricky" action choreographer action director stunt coordinator	Alternate titles: Five Lucky Stars 2 and Lucky Stars Superior Shine and Winners And Sinners 2
1985	Mr. Vampire	殭屍先生	"hopping vampire" (jiang shi)	
1985	Heart of Dragon	龍的心	action director stuntman Film original name Heart of the Dragon	Alternate titles: The First Mission and Powerman III
1985	Those Merry Souls	時來運轉	"Chiu Chi-lung" action director	Alternate title: From the Great Beyond
1985	Twinkle, Twinkle Lucky Stars	夏日福星	"Inspector Ricky Fung" action director Act with Jackie Chan and Sammo Hung	Alternate titles: Five Lucky Stars 3 and Summer Time Lucky Stars and Winners And Sinners 3
1986	Millionaires Express	富貴列車	"Fire Chief Tsao Cheuk-kin" stuntman	Alternate title: Shanghai Express
1986	Rosa	神勇雙響炮續集	"'Little Monster / Hsia" action director action choreographer	
1986	Mr. Vampire 2	殭屍家族	"Yen"	
1986	Righting Wrongs	執法先鋒	"Hsai Ling-cheng" a.k.a. "Jason Chan" producer action director action choreographer	Alternate title: Above the Law
1986	Young Champion	ヤングチャンピオン		Japanese film
1987	Eastern Condors	東方禿鷹	"Man Yen-chieh" a.k.a. "Rat" action director stunt coordinator	
1988	Dragons Forever	飛龍猛將	"Tung Tak-piu" a.k.a. "Timothy" action director	Alternate title: Cyclone Z
1988	Picture of a Nymph	畫中仙	"Shih Erh"	
1988	On the Run	亡命鴛鴦	"Heung Ming"	
1989	Peacock King	孔雀王子	"Monk Peacock" co-director	
1989	Miracles	奇蹟	"beggar" (cameo)	Alternate titles: Miracles Canton Godfather and Mr. Canton And Lady Rose
1989	The Iceman Cometh	急凍奇俠	"Fong Sau-ching" action director action choreographer)	
1990	Saga of the Phoenix	阿修羅	"Peacock"	
1990	Licence to Steal	龍鳳賊捉賊	"Swordsman"	Alternate title: Dragon Versus Phoenix
1990	Shanghai, Shanghai	亂世兒女	"Little Tiger"	Alternate title: Shanghai Encounter
1991	Once Upon a Time in China	黃飛鴻	"Leung Foon"	
1991	Baka yarô! 4 You! Omae no koto da yo 3 Sagi naru Japan	バカヤロー!4 YOU! お前のことだよ	"Hoi"	Bakayaro! is an anthology film by Japanese directors. Yuen starred in one part.
1992	A Kid from Tibet	西藏小子	"Lo Ba Wong La" director producer action director	
1992	Shogun and Little Kitchen	伙頭福星	"Tang Tai-chi"	
1992	The Setting Sun	落陽	"Tougetsu" action director	
1992	Ghost Killer	俾鬼玩	action director	
1993	The Sword Stained with Royal Blood	新碧血劍	"Constable Yuen Shing-chi"	
1993	Deadful Melody	六指琴魔	"Lui Lun"	
1993	Kick Boxer	黃飛鴻之鬼腳七	"Lau Zhai" producer action director	Alternate titles: Once Upon a Chinese Hero and Once Upon A Time In China 6 Kickboxer
1993	Kin chan no Cinema Jack	陳健沒有傑克電影院		This is an anthology film, a joint production between Australia, Hong Kong and Japan. The HK section featured Yuen Biao and was produced by Jackie Chan.
1994	Circus Kid	馬戲小子	"Han" a.k.a. "Tung"	
1995	Don't Give a Damn	方面俾	"Rambo Wong Yuk-man"	Alternate title: Burger Cop
1995	Tough Beauty and the Sloppy Slop	怒海威龍	"Lee King-tong"	
1995	The First Assignment	演職員表		
1996	The Hero of Swallow	神偷燕子李三	"Li San" a.k.a. "Swallow Thief"	
1996	Dragon in Shaolin	龍在少林	"Chung Yat-shan"	Alternate title: Dragon from Shaolin
1997	The Hunted Hunter	檔案X殺人犯	"Lin Yue-feng"	
1997	Hero	馬永貞	"Tam See"	
1997	Leopard Hunting	獵豹行動	action director	
1999	A Man Called Hero	中華英雄	"Boss"	Alternate title: Chinese Hero
1999	Millennium Dragon	紅牆盜影	"Ma Sar"	
2000	Shanghai Noon	西域威龍	"saloon fighter" (uncredited) action director stuntman stunt coordinator	
2001	The Avenging Fist	拳神	"Thunder"	Alternate title: Fight Zone
2002	No Problem 2	無問題2	"Lam Kau" action director	
2004	Enter the Phoenix	大佬愛美麗	"Mr Hung"	
2004	Boxer's Story	赤子拳王	"Wah" co-director	Alternate title: Father and Son
2004	Hero Youngster	少年陳真	"Mr Ou"	Alternate title: Juvenile Chen Zhen
2006	Rob-B-Hood	寶貝計劃	"Inspector Steve Mok"	
2007	Fight For Love	擊情歲月		
2007	Legend of Twins Dragon	雙龍記		Alternate title: Shuang Long Ji film derived from Wing Chun TV series
2009	Turning Point	Laughing Gor之變節	"Superintendent Sin"	Alternate title: Laughing Gor
2010	Just Another Pandora's Box	越光寶盒	"Liu Bei"	
2010	Empire of Assassins	帝國刺客		
2010	The Legend Is Born – Ip Man	葉問前傳	"Ng Chung-suk" / Vincent Yuan	
2011	My Kingdom	大武生		
2012	Tai Chi Hero	太極2 英雄崛起	"Master Li Qian-kun"	
2014	Sifu vs Vampire	天師鬥殭屍	"Feng Shui"	
2016	The Bodyguard	特工爺爺	"Officer" (cameo appearance)	Alternate title: 老衛兵

== Television series ==
Year	Series title	Alternate	Role	Notes
1998	Kingdom and the Beauty	江山美人		a.k.a. Chinese Odyssey - King Zhende and Phoenix aka The King and I
1998	The Legend of a Chinese Hero	中華兒女英雄傳		
2000	The Legend of the Martial Alliance	少林七嵌		a.k.a. The Seven Heroes of Shaolin
2002	Righteous Guards	中原鏢局	"Sima Bu-ping"	
2005	Real Kung Fu	佛山贊師父	"Leung Jan"	a.k.a. Mr Chan of Fu Shan
2006	Wing Chun	詠春	"Leung Jan"	
2007	The Ultimate Crime Fighter	通天干探	"Yuen Fo-sun"	
2008	The Disciple	龍的傳人	guest judge	Jackie Chan's reality show for Mainland China channel China Beijing TV Station
2009	Legend of Shaolin Kungfu	少林寺传奇	"Tan Zong"	This is a 120-episode series, split into 3 parts. Yuen stars in the second part, Legend of Shaolin Kungfu II: Thirteen Warrior Monks (十三棍僧救唐王) a.k.a. 13 Cudgel Monks
2012	The Legend of Wing Chun	詠春傳奇		
2013	12 Deadly Coins	十二金錢鏢		first Chinese TV drama in 3D
2016	Infernal Affairs	無間道	"Hung Sir"	Guest appearance on episode 30
2020	Deer Squad	无敌鹿战队	"Kai"	Chinese version

All television appearances were broadcast in Hong Kong by TVB unless otherwise stated.
