= Mr. Boo Meets Pom Pom =

1985 Hong Kong film by Wu Ma

- Film poster
- Traditional Chinese: 智勇三寶
- Jyutping: zi3 jung5 saam1 bou2
- Directed by: Wu Ma
- Written by: Jo Chan
- Produced by: Sammo Hung
- Starring: Richard Ng; John Shum
- Cinematography: David Chung; Wong Joi-Keung
- Edited by: Peter Cheung; Keung Chuen-Tak
- Music by: Joseph Chan; Tang Siu-Lam
- Production companies: D & B Films Co. Ltd.
- Release date: 3 September 1985
- Running time: 83 minutes
- Country: Hong Kong
- Language: Cantonese
- Box office: HK$17,089,402.00

Mr. Boo Meets Pom Pom (Chinese: 智勇三寶) is a 1985 Hong Kong comedy film directed by Wu Ma. The film was written by Jo Chan, and produced by Sammo Hung. The film stars Michael Hui, Terry Hu, Richard Ng, and John Shum. It is the third film in the Pom Pom film series which is a spin-off the Lucky Stars series.

== Plot ==
Working at the police forensic department Mr Boo, although absent-minded and scruffy, is successful at his job. His beautiful wife begins to be courted by handsome billionaire Yang and now Mr Boo must try to win back her love. While on a job involving a bank robbery he befriend detectives Ng and Beethoven who promise to help him with his love life.

== Cast ==
- Michael Hui as Mr. Boo
- Terry Hu as Mr. Boo's wife
- Richard Ng as Officer Ng Ah-chiu
- John Shum as Officer Beethoven
- Deannie Yip as Anna, Ng's lover
- Stuart Ong as Yang
