= The Last Blood =

1991 Hong Kong film by Wong Jing

- Film poster

Chinese name
- Traditional Chinese: 驚天十二小時
- Simplified Chinese: 惊天十二小时
Transcriptions
Standard Mandarin
- Hanyu Pinyin: Jīng Tiān Shí Èr Xiǎo Shí
Yue: Cantonese
- Jyutping: Ging1 Tin1 Sap6 Ji6 Siu2 Si4
- Directed by: Wong Jing
- Screenplay by: Wong Jing
- Produced by: Eric Tsang; Wallace Cheung
- Starring: Alan Tam; Andy Lau; Eric Tsang; Bryan Leung; May Lo; Natalis Chan
- Cinematography: Jingle Ma; David Choi
- Edited by: Cheung Kwok-kuen
- Music by: Tats Lau; Patrick Lau; Choi Hon-tuen
- Production company: Movie Impact Limited
- Distributed by: Newport Entertainment
- Release date: 14 March 1991
- Running time: 94 minutes
- Country: Hong Kong
- Languages: Cantonese; Mandarin; Japanese
- Box office: HK$13,984,574

The Last Blood (originally released in the United Kingdom as Hard Boiled 2, and in the Philippines as Police Protectors; the original Chinese title roughly translates to 12 Hours of Terror) is a 1991 Hong Kong action film directed by Wong Jing and starring Alan Tam, Andy Lau, Eric Tsang and Bryan Leung.

== Plot ==
One night a man approaches a residence to deliver a video-tape to its occupants, all of whom are armed terrorists. When his face is shown on the video someone hands him a gun and they kill most of the terrorists as armed police arrive. But their leader is able to escape, leaving nearly the entire arrest team dead or wounded. It is revealed to be an Interpol operation, under the responsibility of officers Lui Tai and Stone. The hideout belonged to a cell of the Japanese Red Army, under the leadership of the cell's Chinese commander named Kama Kura. They know that the JRA threat is not over as Kama Kura has many members of his cell all across Singapore.

The next day, on the 25th Singapore National Day, the Daka Lama visits Singapore for an interview. However the JRA ambushes the detail at Changi Airport and the religious leader is seriously injured. Big B, a vacationing triad member from Hong Kong, is also caught up in the attack and his girlfriend is also shot in the incident. Both are admitted to the same hospital and it is discovered that they both have the same type of rare blood type of which only three people have in the whole of Singapore. Due to the security threat the Singaporean Army sends men to the hospital.

Big B and the police quickly search for the three donors. However, the Japanese Red Army soon kill the first two, leaving Big B to find and protect the final donor, a lowlife named Fatty who is reluctant to help either the gangster or the police. However a JRA ambush at Sentosa means Fatty and Big B are apprehended by the police. Things worsen when their convoy is ambushed in the night, leaving Lui Tai, Big B, Fatty and Lui's partner, Stone the only survivors; only to be pursued by Japanese Red Army terrorists on motorcycles which ends with the 4 of them escaping on the MRT, but not before capturing one terrorist. The way of how the JRA are able to know of the Daka Lama's arrival, the donors as well as their movements, lead Lui Tai to suspect that there may be a mole.

Meanwhile, the JRA cell and their leader Kama Kura continue plotting their next move, which involves going after Fatty and his girlfriend. But that fails with 2 of the 4-strong hit squad losing 2 men to Stone and Lui Tai. However the terrorists soon figure out where Fatty has gone to, and target the family of his girlfriend. In the battle that ensues, Fatty's girlfriend and all but one member of her family are killed, leading Fatty to personally exact revenge on one of the hitmen.

Outside the residence Stone finally reveals that he was the mole working with the JRA, due to the high extra pay offered by Kama Kura which was badly needed due to his big family. This explains why; in a raid earlier on, did Kama Kura manage to escape: Stone did fire at Kama Kura but missed the terrorist leader (most likely on purpose) . Lui Tai however ends the betrayal in a match of quick-draw whereby Lui shoots Stone in the head, but Stone missed. After witnessing the tragedy of his girlfriend Fatty agrees to donate his blood to save the Daka as well as B's girlfriend, as a promise to his own deceased girlfriend.

With the information reaching Kama Kura, he attacks the hospital with his last terrorists; losing his female assassin when the Daka throws a surgical knife and hits her throat. This prompts Kama Kura himself to lead the last attack, killing all the guards before the henchman is killed by Lui. A final battle rages between Big B, Lui and Kama Kura while Fatty goes for the blood donation, handled by a local doctor there only known as Dr. Ferrari by his colleagues. Lui, meanwhile is overpowered by Kama Kura who repeatedly uses a grenade launcher; but Big B intervenes and disarms the terrorist leader by removing the magazine from his M16A1 assault rifle, leaving the pair to engage in hand-to-hand combat to which Big B is nearly defeated but holds off the terrorist leader with an oxygen cylinder. Lui is able to retrieve his gun by using a remote control car belonging to one of Stone's daughters and shoot the cylinder just as Kama Kura tries to throw it at Big B; thus ending the JRA threat to the Daka; who together with B's girlfriend, are both saved thanks to the badly needed blood transfusion.

== Cast ==
- Alan Tam as Lui Tai, an Interpol officer
- Andy Lau as Big B, a Hong Kong triad member going on vacation in Singapore
- Eric Tsang as Fatty
- Bryan Leung as Stone, a police officer who worked as mole for the Japanese Red Army for money
- May Lo as May / Ling, B's girlfriend
- Natalis Chan as Doctor Ferrari
- Law Shu-kei as Daka Lama
- Jackson Lau as Soporo
- Chin Ho as Kama Kura
- Chui Sau-lai as Ling
- Jazreel Low
- Teo Ser Lee
- Poon Yan
- Ang Puay Heng
- Cheung Kam-yuk
- Yeung Yim-ching
- Yeung Wing-cheung
- Wong Kwun-lung
- Lam Hoi-kwok
- Cheng Chan-seng
- Lee Kam-loi
- Chu Kwan-yeung as Daka Lama's bodyguard
- Hung Tung-kim

== Release ==
The Last Blood was released in Hong Kong on 14 March 1991. In the Philippines, the film was released by Solar Films as Police Protectors on 30 January 1992.

== Box office and reception ==
The film grossed HK$13,984,574 at the Hong Kong box office during its theatrical run.

A critic for Sight and Sound, who reviewed a VHS release of the film in 1995, declared it "a shaggy dog thriller" elevated by its "tightly directed set-pieces, slow-motion photography and superbly choreographed fights". They also criticised the video's poor subtitling, stating that it turned the film into a "travesty".
