= Pom Pom Strikes Back =

1986 Hong Kong film by Wu Ma

- Film poster
- Traditional Chinese: 雙龍吐珠
- Jyutping: soeng1 lung4 tou3 zyu1
- Directed by: Teddy Yip Wing-Cho
- Written by: Jo Chan
- Produced by: John Shum; Melvin Wong
- Starring: Richard Ng; John Shum
- Cinematography: Yee Tung-Lung
- Edited by: Cheung Kwok-Kuen
- Music by: Danny Chung
- Production companies: D&B Films Co. Ltd.
- Release date: 14 August 1986
- Running time: 86 minutes
- Country: Hong Kong
- Language: Cantonese
- Box office: HK $10,533,418.00

Pom Pom Strikes Back is a 1986 Hong Kong comedy film directed by Wu Ma and starring Richard Ng and John Shum. It is the fourth and final film in the Pom Pom film series which is a spin-off the Lucky Stars series.

== Plot ==
Police officers Chow (Richard Ng) and Beethoven (John Shum) are close friend who must protect a witness May (May Lo Mei Mei) after she witnesses a gangland murder. Meanwhile Beethoven mistakenly discovers that Chow is dying of cancer and sets out to make his last few months memorable.

== Cast ==
- Richard Ng as officer Ng Ah Chiu
- John Shum as officer Beethoven
- Deannie Yip as Mrs Anna Ng, Ng's wife
- May Lo as May
