= Ghost Punting =

1992 Hong Kong film by Sammo Hung

- Original Hong Kong Poster

Chinese name
- Traditional Chinese: 五福星撞鬼
- Simplified Chinese: 五福星撞鬼
Transcriptions
Standard Mandarin
- Hanyu Pinyin: Wŭ Fú Xīng Zhuàng Guǐ
Yue: Cantonese
- Jyutping: Ng2 Fuk1 Sing1 Zong6 Gwai2
- Directed by: Sammo Hung; Corey Yuen; Eric Tsang; Ricky Lau
- Written by: Barry Wong
- Produced by: Teddy Yip
- Starring: Sammo Hung; Eric Tsang; Natalis Chan; Stanley Fung; Richard Ng; Charlie Chin
- Cinematography: Jimmy Leung; Chan Yuen Kai
- Edited by: Hai Kit Wai
- Music by: Sherman Chow
- Production company: Choice Film Productions Co., Ltd.
- Distributed by: Newport Entertainment Ltd
- Release date: 27 March 1992
- Running time: 94 minutes
- Country: Hong Kong
- Language: Cantonese
- Box office: HK $8,281,568

Ghost Punting (Chinese: 五福星撞鬼), also known as Lucky Stars Ghost Encounter, is a 1992 Hong Kong action comedy film directed by and starring Sammo Hung. It is the sixth film of the Lucky Stars series. Co-starring Lucky Stars members Eric Tsang (also co-director), Stanley Fung, Richard Ng, Charlie Chin and non-Lucky Star member Natalis Chan with action choreography by the Sammo Hung Stuntmen's Association and Corey Yuen (also co-director). The film's emphasis is more on comedy than action.

== Synopsis ==
The Lucky Stars go on an island vacation and discover a nympho ghost in a castle near their cabin. Four policewomen come to investigate and the boys try to put the moves on them. After many failed attempts, one of the policewomen, Lai Ti, is possessed by a male ghost that is residing in the castle. The gang take her back to Hong Kong where they learn that the ghost wants revenge for his death. The gang are more than willing to oblige if the ghost helps them cheat in gambling. This all leads to the inevitable showdown where Kidstuff uses his kung fu skills to fight the ghost's killers.

== Cast ==
Cast	Role
Sammo Hung	Eric / Kidstuff / Tse Koo Choy
Stanley Fung	Rhino Skin / Rawhide
Richard Ng	Dai Sang Dei / Sandy
Charlie Chin	U.S. Ginseng / Herb
Eric Tsang	Buddha Fruit / Roundhead
Natalis Chan	The Ghost
Sibelle Hu	Barbara Wu / Baa Wong Faa ("Tyrant Flower", a slang nickname given to tough policewomen)
Lui Siu-ling	Leung Lai Ti
Mondi Yau	Yau Siu Chau
Chin Ho	Siu Chau's boyfriend
Marianne Chan	Pretty-As-Snow
Teddy Yip	Card Player
Ng Ka Man	
Ricky Lau	Store owner on Lantau Island

== Box office ==
This film grossed HK $8,281,568 at the Hong Kong box office.
