= How to Meet the Lucky Stars =

1996 Hong Kong film by Frankie Chan

- Hong Kong film poster
- Traditional Chinese: 運財五福星
- Simplified Chinese: 运财五福星
- Hanyu Pinyin: Yún Qǎi Wŭ Fú Xīng
- Jyutping: Wan6 Coi6 Ng2 Fuk1 Sing1
- Directed by: Frankie Chan
- Written by: Lee Chi-wai; Lee Ping-kwong; Ivy Lee
- Produced by: Eric Tsang
- Starring: Sammo Hung; Eric Tsang; Richard Ng; Stanley Fung; Michael Miu; Françoise Yip
- Cinematography: Sung Kong; Ng Wing-kit; Venus Keung; Fletcher Poon
- Edited by: Jelly Mak
- Music by: Roel A. Garcia
- Production company: Grand March Movie Production
- Distributed by: Newport Entertainment
- Release date: 4 July 1996
- Running time: 112 minutes
- Country: Hong Kong
- Language: Cantonese
- Box office: HK $2,084,545

How to Meet the Lucky Stars (Chinese: 運財五福星) is a 1996 Hong Kong action comedy film directed by Frankie Chan with action choreography by Yuen Cheung-yan and Mars. This is the seventh and final film in the Lucky Stars series. Featuring the "Lucky Stars" Sammo Hung (in his original role and another role as a cop), Eric Tsang (who also produced), Richard Ng, Stanley Fung, Michael Miu, with new cast member Vincent Lau Tak as Hung's younger cousin and Françoise Yip as their love interest (except for Hung and Lau). The film featuring a number of guest appearances including Natalis Chan, Chen Kuan-tai, Cheng Pei-pei, Chan Hung-lit, and Nora Miao in her final Hong Kong theatrically released film until 2008. The film was released as a benefit film for the famous Hong Kong filmmaker Lo Wei, who died in 1996.

== Synopsis ==
During an international gambling competition, "The King of Gamblers" Lui Tin (Chen Kuan-tai) loses to the lascivious, psychotic lesbian queen of gamblers Sheung-kung Fei-fa aka "The Gambling Flower" (Kung Suet-fa) which causes him to commit suicide. His daughter Wai-lam (Fung Sau-yin) vows to avenge her father's death and get help from her late father's good friend. Uncle Wah (Cho Tat-wah), who is a police inspector. Wah also enlists the "Lucky Stars" to assist him.

== Cast ==
=== The Lucky Stars ===
Cast	Role
Sammo Hung	Eric / Kidstuff / Chi-koo Choi
Eric Tsang	Roundhead / Lo-han Kuo
Richard Ng	Sandy / Dee
Stanley Fung	Rawhide / Rhino Skin
Michael Miu	Pagoda / Ginseng
Vincent Lau Tak	Leung

=== The Female Team ===
Cast	Role
Françoise Yip	Francoise
Kung Suet-Fa	Sheung Kung Fei Fa (aka "The Gambling Flower")
Fung Sau-yin, Anthea Pang	Lui Wai-lam
Diana Pang	Bo Bo

=== Police force ===
Cast	Role
Cho Tat-wah	Uncle Wah
Sammo Hung	Big Head Tai-lam Choi

=== Guest star ===
Cast	Role
Natalis Chan	King of Swindler
Chen Kuan-tai	Lui Tin aka "The King of Gamblers"
Cheng Pei-pei	Chu Ba
Nora Miao	Gamble Announcer
Mark Houghton	Blonde Henchmen
Kim Penn	Niki (uncredited)

=== Cameo appearance ===
Cast	Role
Chan Hung-lit	Supreme of Gamblers
Gabriel Wong	Cheung Fan
Shing Fui-On	Tai Sor (Big Crazy)
Kingdom Yuen	Tai Sor's wife
Joe Ma	
Tony Liu	Gambler
Yuen Cheung-yan	Mahjong Player
Mars	Mahjong Player
Canti Lau	Gambler
Benny Lai	Henchmen
Anthony Carpio	Henchman (uncredited)
Johnny Cheung	Henchman
Rocky Lai	Henchman
William Tuen	Gambler
Gabriel Wong	Man in Green Suit
Lowell Lo	
James Tien	

== Box office ==
This film grossed HK $2,084,545 during its theatrical run from 4–19 July 1996 in Hong Kong.
