= The Gambling Ghost =

1991 Hong Kong film by Clifton Ko

- UK DVD cover
- Directed by: Clifton Ko
- Written by: Roman Cheung
- Produced by: Clifton Ko; Sammo Hung
- Starring: Sammo Hung; Man Hoi; Nina Li Chi; James Wong
- Cinematography: Lee Yau-tong; Ng Cho-wah
- Edited by: Kam Ma
- Music by: Richard Yuen; Tang Siu-Lam
- Production company: Golden Leaf Film Production
- Distributed by: Newport Films
- Release date: 2 March 1991 (Hong Kong)
- Running time: 90 minutes
- Country: Hong Kong
- Language: Cantonese
- Box office: HK $7,729,690.00

The Gambling Ghost (Chinese: 洪福齊天) is a 1991 Hong Kong action comedy film directed by Clifton Ko. It stars Sammo Hung in three roles as different generations of the same family - son, father and ghostly grandfather. Hung's co-star, Mang Hoi also worked as the film's action director.

The opening scene of the film parodies another Hong Kong film, God of Gamblers.

== Cast ==
- Sammo Hung - Fatty Big Brock / Fat Bao (Fatty's father) / Hung Kau/Gao
- Nina Li Chi - Miss Lily (as Nina Li)
- Mang Hoi - Hoi Siu-Hon (as Man Hoi)
- James Wong - Rich Brother Dragon
- Teddy Yip Wing-Cho - Yau Mo-Leung (Kau's Partner) (as Ip Wing Cho)
- Wu Ma - Uncle Ng (as Ng Ma)
- Corey Yuen - Gambler Wah
- Chung Fat - Driver
- Stanley Fung - Motorcycle Cop (as Fung Shu Fan)
- Lam Ching-ying - Exorcist
- Richard Ng - Roadblock Cop #1 (as Ricky Ng)
- Billy Ching Sau Yat - Roadlock Cop #2
- Billy Chow - Yau's Bodyguard
- Robert Samuels - Yau's Bodyguard
- James Tien - Monk Taoist Foster (as Tin Chuen)
- Paul Chun - Gambler (as Chun Pui)
- Jameson Lam - Wedding Thug
- Garry Chan - Wedding Thug
- Hon Ping - Thug
- Tsim Siu-Ling - Thug
- Jue Wan-Sing - Thug
- Kwan Kwok-Chung - Thug
- Kwan Yung - Thug
- Chan Sek - Thug
- Ouyang Sha-fei - Mahjong Player
- Man Wah Tsui - Lottery Hostess
- Clifton Ko - TV Crew Member (as Clifton C.S. Ko)
- Norman Ng
- Huang Kai-Sen
- Frank Liu
- Jobic Wong
- Yuet Yue Chan
- Simon Yip
- Chiu Sek-Man
- Wong Man-Shing
- Leung Sam
