= Françoise Yip =

Canadian actress

- Born: Françoise Fong-Wa Yip; North Vancouver, British Columbia, Canada
- Occupation: Actress
- Years active: 1995–present

Chinese name
- Traditional Chinese: 葉芳華
- Simplified Chinese: 叶芳华
Transcriptions
Standard Mandarin
- Hanyu Pinyin: Yè Fānghuá
Yue: Cantonese
- Jyutping: jip6 fong1 waa4

Françoise Fong-Wa Yip (葉芳華) is a Canadian actress. She first became known for her performances in Hong Kong films, before later also starring in North American films and television shows. She is best known to international audiences for her roles in action films opposite of Jackie Chan and Jet Li.

== Early life and education ==
Yip was born in North Vancouver, British Columbia of Canada, and raised in North Vancouver, British Columbia. Her father is a Canadian of Chinese ancestry and her mother is French.

== Career ==
Yip is known for her roles in Stanley Tong's Rumble in the Bronx and Daniel Lee's Black Mask. She did two movies with Jet Li, the first in a starring role in Black Mask and the second in Romeo Must Die, where she played a Chinese gangster motorcycle assassin. She also starred in the Doris Yeung film Motherland and appeared in the American action horror films: Aliens vs. Predator: Requiem, Alone in the Dark and Blade: Trinity.

Yip appeared in the television series Andromeda as two different characters, and guest-starred in the Canadian TV show Blood Ties.

== Filmography ==
=== Film ===
Year	Title	Role	Notes
1992	Ghost Punting	Policewoman Subordinate	
1995	Fighting for My Daughter	Girlfriend	TV movie
1995	Rumble in the Bronx	Nancy	
1995	Infatuation	Maggie	
1995	Two Impossible Films	Johann Woo	Short Film
1996	Wild	Wai	
1996	How to Meet the Lucky Stars	Françoise	
1996	On Fire	Herself	
1996	Mr. Mumble	Saeko Nogami / Yachi	
1996	Black Mask	Yeuk-Lan	
1997	Enjoy Yourself To-night	Susan	
1997	Web of Deception	Fion Wong	
1998	Futuresport	Keahi	TV movie
2000	Romeo Must Die	Meriana Sing, Motorcycle Fighter	
2000	Special Delivery	Flight Attendant	TV movie
2000	A Good Burn	Koa	
2001	Witness to a Kill	Kirsten Lee	
2001	Lunch with Charles	Cora	
2001	The Pledge	Bartender At Airport	
2001	Mindstorm	Newscaster	TV movie
2002	Cabin Pressure	Tammy	TV movie
2002	The New Beachcombers	Constable Kelly Mah	TV movie
2004	A Beachcombers Christmas	Constable Kelly Mah	TV movie
2004	Blade: Trinity	Virago	
2005	Alone in the Dark	Agent Cheung	
2005	Edison	'Crow'	
2005	The Deal	Janice Long	
2007	Aliens vs. Predator: Requiem	Ms. Yu	
2008	Dim Sum Funeral	Victoria	
2009	Motherland	Raffi Tang	
2010	The King of Fighters	Chizuru Kagura	
2011	Possessing Piper Rose	Margot Lace	TV movie
2013	Garage Sale Mystery	Katherine Norbert	TV movie
2014	The Unauthorized Saved by the Bell Story	Pauline Gosselaar	TV movie
2017	Deadly Lessons	Beverly	TV movie
2017	Seduced By Seduction (a.k.a. Ring of Deception)	Elizabeth	TV movie
2017	Everything, Everything	Dr. Francis	
2018	The Perfect Bride 2: Wedding Bells	Georgia	TV movie
2018	The Predator	Tracking Supervisor	
2020	Christmas on the Vine	Sara	TV movie
2020	The Charm Bracelet	Sheyla Green	TV movie

=== Television ===
Year	Title	Role	Notes
1998	Millennium	Stewardess #2	Episode: "The Innocents"
1999	Earth: Final Conflict	Beverly Wu	Episode: "Heroes & Heartbreak"
1999	Deep in the City	Unknown	Episode: Deranged Marriages
2000	Secret Agent Man	Felicia	Episode: "WhupSumAss"
2000	Seven Days	Li Mai	Episode: "Olga's Excellent Vacation"
2000–2001	Freedom	Jin	8 episodes
2001	Wolf Lake	Reporter	Unaired Pilot
2001	These Arms of Mine	Jenny Wong	3 episodes
2001	RoboCop: Prime Directives	Lexx Icon	2 episodes
2002	Flatland	Amy Li	22 episodes
2003	Jeremiah	Rachel	2 episodes
2003–2004	Smallville	Dr. Lia Tang	5 episodes
2004	Stephen King's Dead Zone	Maria	Episode: Speak Now
2001–2005	Andromeda	Ashael / Rekel Ben-Tzion	2 episodes
2006	Men in Trees	Alice K	Episode: "Pilot"
2007	Flash Gordon	Susan Glass	Episode: "Conspiracy Theory"
2007–2008	Blood Ties	Kate Lam	14 episodes
2010	Caprica	Desiree Willow	2 episodes
2011	Fringe	Dr. Rosa Oporto	Episode: "Bloodline"
2011	Sanctuary	Dr. Lillian Lee	3 episodes
2015	Girlfriends' Guide to Divorce	Aja	Episode: "Rule #92: Don't Do the Crime If You Can't Do the Crime"
2015	Arrow	Priestess	2 episodes
2015	Proof	Police Officer	Episode: "St. Luke's"
2015	Mistresses	Doctor	Episode: "Unreliable Witness"
2015	Ties That Bind	Ying	Episode: "Paying for It"
2016	No Tomorrow	Rose	Episode: "No Soup for You"
2018–2019	Shadowhunters	Jia Penhallow	4 episodes
2018	Take Two	Cheryl Axelrod	episode: "Death Becomes Him"
2019–2020	The Order	Elizabeth Kepler	12 episodes
2021	Kung Fu	Diana Soong	3 episodes
2021	Mystery 101	Carmela Rhee	Episode: "Deadly History"
2023	Goosebumps	Victoria	8 episodes
