= Shogun and Little Kitchen =

1992 Hong Kong film by Ronny Yu

- Film poster

Chinese name
- Traditional Chinese: 伙頭福星
- Simplified Chinese: 伙头福星
Transcriptions
Standard Mandarin
- Hanyu Pinyin: Huǒ Tóu Fú Xīng
Yue: Cantonese
- Jyutping: Fo2 Tau4 Feok1 Sing1
- Directed by: Ronny Yu
- Screenplay by: Raymond To; James Yuen
- Produced by: Laura Fau
- Starring: Yuen Biao; Leon Lai; Ng Man-tat; Maggie Shiu; Monica Chan
- Cinematography: David Chung; Andrew Lau
- Edited by: David Wu
- Music by: Richard Yuen
- Production company: Hoventin Films
- Distributed by: Gala Film Distribution
- Release date: 19 March 1992
- Running time: 93 minutes
- Country: Hong Kong
- Language: Cantonese
- Box office: HK$9.6 million

Shogun and Little Kitchen is a 1992 Hong Kong comedy film directed by Ronny Yu and starring Yuen Biao, Leon Lai, Ng Man-tat, Maggie Shiu and Monica Chan.

== Plot ==
Uncle Bo (Ng Man-tat) is the owner of the Tai Ping Fong old building. He inherited the building from his late wife years ago and he would rent different units to others. Although the tenants do not actually pay rent, Bo maintains a good relationship with them just like a big family. On the contrary, rich heir Lam Fung's (Leon Lai) relationship with his father Lam Chung-yuen (Jimmy Wang Yu) is very cold due to his hatred of his father. On the day of his birthday, Fung gets into an argument with his father and runs away from home. Afterwards, Fung was robbed and beaten into a coma by a crock. Uncle Bo finds Fung collapsed and brings him to Tai Ping Fong to heal him.

At Tai Ping Fong, Fung experiences love and care by others. There, Fung also develops a relationship with Bo's daughter, Maggie (Maggie Shiu). However, Maggie was angry after she discovers Fung's true identity. Furthermore, Bo's uncle, Tang Tai-chi (Yuen Biao), whom recently arrived to Hong Kong from Beijing, was poached by a catering company due to his amazing cooking and acrobatic skills. Bo feels betrayed by Chi and they fell out. Later, Bo's building was also acquired by the Lam Enterprises. Because Bo was reluctant to sell the building, Lam Chung-yuen's assistant, Raymond (Lam Lap-sam), hires triad thugs to force Bo to sign the contract.

== Cast ==
- Yuen Biao as Tang Tai-chi
- Leon Lai as Lam Fung
- Ng Man-tat as Uncle Bo
- Maggie Shiu as Maggie Ko Tin-oi
- Monica Chan as Jacqueline Kwok
- Jimmy Wang Yu as Lam Chung-yuen
- Bryan Leung as Mr. Tong Ching
- David Lui as Chow Wai-cheung
- Josephine Koo as Wong Yu-ying
- Lam Lap-sam as Raymond Chan
- Hau Woon-ling as Bo's Neighbor
- Fong Yue as Shanghai Woman
- Tang Cheung as Wah
- Leung Gam-san as Bill
- Jim James as Uncle Bo's customer
- Hui Sze-man as Wedding guest
- Ernest Mauser as Uncle Bo's customer
- Leung Sam as Bo's tenant
- Cheung Siu as Bo's tenant
- Leung Kei-hei as Uncle Bo's customer
- Chan Man-hiu as Auntie Eight
- Kent Chow as Chong
- Jack Wong as Bill's thug
- San Sin as Bing
- Hoh Wan as Bo's tenant
- Lam Chi-tai

== Reception ==
=== Critical ===
Love HK Film gave the film a positive review and writes "Standard formula and annoyingly cute subplots drag the film down, but Yuen Biao's athletic stuntwork makes the movie a fun, if not crucial viewing experience. The film doesn't challenge you in any way, but it's really not meant to. Undemanding fun."

=== Box office ===
The film grossed HK$9,687,943 at the Hong Kong box office during its theatrical run from 19 March to 13 April 1992 in Hong Kong.

== See also ==
- Yuen Biao filmography
