= Stanley Fung =

Hong Kong-Taiwanese actor and film director (1944–2025)

- Born: Fung Siu-kan; 8 November 1944; Shuntak, Kwangtung, China
- Died: 31 October 2025 (aged 80); Linkou, New Taipei, Taiwan
- Years active: 1967–2024

Chinese name
- Traditional Chinese: 馮淬帆
- Simplified Chinese: 冯淬帆
Transcriptions
Standard Mandarin
- Hanyu Pinyin: Féng Cuìfān
- Wade–Giles: Fêng2 Tsʻui4-fan1
Yue: Cantonese
- Jyutping: Fung4 Seoi6-faan4

Fung Siu-kan
- Traditional Chinese: 馮兆覲
- Simplified Chinese: 冯兆觐
Transcriptions
Standard Mandarin
- Hanyu Pinyin: Féng Zhàojǐn
- Wade–Giles: Fêng2 Chao4-chin3
Yue: Cantonese
- Jyutping: Fung4 Siu6-gan2

Signature
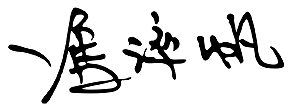

Stanley Fung Shui-fan (8 November 1944 – 31 October 2025) was a Hong Kong and Taiwanese actor and film director known for playing comedic roles. He was one of the Lucky Stars.

== Early life ==
Fung was born in Guangdong, China in 1944. He moved to Hong Kong when he was six.

== Career ==
In 1967, Fung became an actor in Hong Kong films. Fung first appeared in the action film To Rose with Love (1967) directed by Chor Yuen. In 1974, Fung became a director and writer. His directorial debut was The Looks of Hong Kong (1974), a Mandarin-language drama. Fung was credited with over 135 films as an actor, 10 films as a director, four films as a writer and three films as a producer.

Fung was one of the main cast of the Lucky Stars, a Hong Kong action comedy film series in the 1980s and 1990s.

Fung first gained attention in Taiwan for the Mandarin dub of The Crazy Companies (1988), in which profanities were replaced by names of fruits, inspiring continued colloquial use of fruit-based terms for profanities. Fung's television debut in Taiwan was in 1992, on the Chinese Television System drama Fairy Godfather.

== Personal life and death ==
Fung relocated to Taiwan in 1989, acquiring full citizenship of Republic of China in 1996.

Fung was a longtime supporter of the Kuomintang (KMT). In 2020, he was invited by the KMT to speak at a public assembly, where he publicly supported cross-strait reunification under a democratic system.

Fung lived at Linkou District of New Taipei, Taiwan.

On 1 November 2025, New Taipei City Councillor Tsai Shu-chun reported on social media that Fung had died the previous day. He was 80.

== Filmography ==
=== Films ===
- 1967 To Rose with Love
- 1968 Du yan xia
- 1968 Won't You Give Me a Kiss?
- 1968 Right to Love
- 1968 Yu nu tian ding
- 1968 Xia sheng
- 1968 Young, Pregnant and Unmarried – Fung Chi-Wai
- 1969 Man Li Man Li Wo Ai Ni – King of Alishan
- The Fragrant Sword (1969)
- 1969 Wise Wives and Foolish Husbands
- 1969 The Joys and Sorrows of Youth
- 1969 Cong ming tai tai ben zhang fu (1969)
- 1969 Tian long bao
- The Prodigal (1969)
- Yu mian sha xing (1969)
- Ming jian Tian Jiao (1969)
- Huan le ren sheng (1970)
- Zong you yi tian zhuo dao ni (1970)
- Cai Li Fo yong qin se mo (1970)
- The Singing Killer (1970)
- Fei xia shen dao (1971)
- The Comet Strikes (1971)
- Feng kuang sha shou (1971) – Kung Chao Nan
- The Deadly Duo (1971)
- Mad Killer (1971)
- Jin xuan feng (1972)
- Pi li shen shun (1972)
- Xiao lao hu (1973) – Kao Dai-liang
- Dai heung lei (1974)
- Tian tang (1974)
- Xiang Gang wu yan xia (1974) – Shi-di Fen-hung
- Xiang Gang chao ren (1975)
- Lover's Destiny (1975) – Warlord Chang
- Bruce: Hong Kong Master (1975)
- Ba bai zhuang shi (1976)
- The Return of the Condor Heroes (1976, TV series)
- The Proud Youth (1978) – Lo Chao-Jun
- The Twins (1979, TV series) – Kong Bik-hok
- Don't Look Now (1980, TV series) – Gor (1980)
- In Love and War (1981, TV Mini-Series) – Yeung Seung-su
- No One Is Innocent (1981, TV mini-series) – Monatan
- Security Unlimited (1981) – Fan
- To Hell with the Devil (1981) – Imp
- Yue nan zi (1982)
- Xue zhong xue (1983)
- Winners and Sinners (1983) – Rookie
- Oh! My Cops (1983)
- Bai yan mei (1983)
- Mad Mad 83 (1983)
- Radio Tycoon (1983, TV series) – Yan Ka-ying
- Feng shui er shi nian (1983) – Feng Tsui Fan
- Pom Pom (1984) – Cameo appearance
- My Darling Genie (1984) – Uncle Fan
- United We Stand (1984, TV Series) – Lui Jen-kong
- Intellectual Trio (1984) – Chan's Superior
- Wheels on Meals (1984) – Motorcycle Punk (uncredited)
- Yau friend mou ging (1984) – Fung Wah
- Dian feng kuang long (1984)
- Lai xin sha zhan (1984)
- The Owl vs Bombo (1984) – Inspector Fung / Uncle Chung
- My Lucky Stars (1985) – Rawhide / Rhino
- Shi lai yun dao (1985) – Uncle Chiu (Lung's father)
- From the Great Beyond (1985)
- Twinkle, Twinkle Lucky Stars (1985) – Rawhide / Rhino
- Unforgettable Fantasy (1985) – Jiu-Fu
- Where's Officer Tuba? (1986) – Police Band Drummer
- Gui gan you yuan (1986) – Lulu's Grandfather
- The Lunatics (1986) – Dr. Tsui
- Lucky Stars Go Places (1986) – Rawhide / Rhino
- Nui ji za pai jun (1986) – Detective
- Pom Pom Strikes Back (1986) – Sick Man in Television
- Mr. Vampire II (1986) – Archaeologist
- Bi gui zhuo (1986) – Fan Pien-Chou
- Sweet Surrender (1986)
- Huan le ren zu (1987)
- Lan du ying xiong (1987)
- The Romancing Star (1987) – Uncle Ken
- Cheng chong chui lui chai (1987) – Uncle Ken
- Quan li fan tan (1987) – Canteen operator
- Call Girl 1988 (1988) – Fang
- The Romancing Star II (1988) – Uncle Ken
- Shyly Spirit (1988) – Captain Hao
- Dragons Forever (1988) – Psychiatrist (uncredited)
- Love Soldier of Fortune (1988) – Go San-Liu
- The Crazy Companies (1988) – Frank
- The Inspector Wears Skirts (1988) – Inspector Kan
- Watch Out (1988) – Lulu's Grandfather
- Bet on Fire (1988) – V7 Guy No. 2
- Chou tan qi ge ban (1988)
- How to Pick Girls Up (1988) – Fei Changfan
- The Dragon Family (1988) – Fung
- Yes, Madam 2 (1988) – Airport Security Officer
- Da hua shen tan (1988)
- The Crazy Companies II (1988) – Frank
- Ye feng kuang (1989)
- The Inspector Wears Skirts 2 (1989) – Kan
- They Came to Rob Hong Kong (1989) – Yuen
- Armageddon (1989)
- Return of the Lucky Stars (1989) – Rhino
- Vampire Buster (1989) – Councillor Stephen Kai
- Dan shen gui zu (1989)
- Iceman Cometh (1989) – Santa Claus
- Cheng shi pan guan (1989) – Kam Shing
- Shi mian mai fu (1989)
- The Romancing Star III (1989) – Uncle Ken
- Haunted Jail House (1990) – Feng
- Ghostly Vixen (1990) – Thrill Seeker from Hong Kong
- Figures from Earth (1990) – Master Thunderbolt
- Look Out, Officer! (1990) – Chin
- Jing cha pa shou liang jia qin (1990)
- The Inspector Wears Skirts III (1990) – Inspector Kan
- Blood Stained Tradewinds (1990) – Uncle Drunk
- Family Day (1990)
- The Gambling Ghost (1991) – Motorcycle Cop
- Devil's Vindata (1991) – Principal You Tse-Nam
- Spiritually a Cop (1991)
- Ghost Punting (1992) – Rawhide
- The Musical Vampire (1992) – The Master Mah Mah-Tay
- Ghost in Me (1992) – Dai Lan Choi
- Thrilling Story (1993)
- How to Meet the Lucky Stars (1996) – Rhino Skin
- Love Is a Many Stupid Thing (2004)
- Hooked On You (2007) – Miu's Dad
- Vengeance (2009) – Tony
- Accident (2009) – Uncle
- I Love Hong Kong (2011) – Ng Tung
- I Love Hong Kong 2012 (2012) – Kwok Ching
- Marry a Perfect Man (2012)
- Tai Chi 0 (2012) – Grand Uncle
- Tai Chi Hero (2012) – Grand Uncle
- I Love Hong Kong 2013 (2013)
- Mortician (2013) – Mr. Wang
- Little Big Master (2015) – Yuen Tin Kindergarten Chancellor
- ATM (2015)
- Robbery (2015)
- Buddy Cops (2016)
- Ying ging hing dai (2016) – Philip Chan
- Edge of Innocence (2017) – Mr. Jiang
- Our Time Will Come (2017)
- Shen ye shi tang (2019) – Uncle Zhong
- Them, Behind the Door (2024)
