= Marrying Mr. Perfect =

2012 Hong Kong film by Wong Jing

- Hong Kong poster
- Directed by: Wong Jing
- Written by: Wong Jing
- Produced by: Wong Jing
- Starring: Gigi Leung; Ronald Cheng; Chapman To; Xie Na; Eric Tsang; Stanley Fung
- Production companies: Wonderland Entertainment, Inc. Jing's Production Limited
- Release dates: 15 March 2012 (Hong Kong); 16 March 2012 (China)
- Running time: 87 minutes
- Country: Hong Kong
- Language: Cantonese

Marrying Mr. Perfect (Chinese: 嫁個100分男人) is a 2012 Hong Kong romantic comedy film directed by Wong Jing.

== Cast ==
- Gigi Leung
- Ronald Cheng
- Chapman To
- Xie Na
- Eric Tsang
- Stanley Fung
