= Natalis Chan =

Hong Kong actor and host

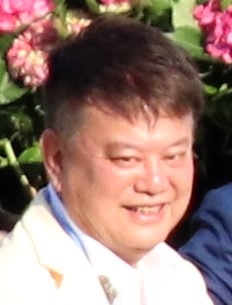
- Chan pictured in 2024
- Born: 3 December 1950 (age 75); British Hong Kong
- Occupations: Actor film producer singer
- Years active: 1978–present
- Spouse: Cecilia Wong (m. 1979)
- Awards: TVB Anniversary Awards – Lifetime Achievement Award (2015)

Chinese name
- Traditional Chinese: 陳百祥
- Simplified Chinese: 陈百祥
Transcriptions
Standard Mandarin
- Hanyu Pinyin: Chén Báixiáng
Yue: Cantonese
- Jyutping: can4 baak3 coeng4
- Musical career
- Also known as: Nat Chan; Chan Pak-Cheung; Natalie Chan; Smart
- Origin: Hong Kong
- Genres: Cinema of Hong Kong; Cantopop

Natalis "Nat" Chan Pak Cheung (born 3 December 1950 in Hong Kong), also known by his nickname "Smart" (阿叻), is a Hong Kong television host, film actor, singer and producer.

Besides his duties as a variety show host, he has also been a horse racing commentator and horse trainer. In total, his horses have won 54 races, including the hard to achieve triple-trifecta six times.

Around the turn of the millennium, he invested in Star East with Eric Tsang.

== Partial filmography ==
- My Kickass Wife (2019)
- Flirting Scholar from the Future (2019)
- Super Models (2015)
- From Vegas to Macau II (2015)
- 4 in Life (2013)
- I Love Hong Kong 2013 (2013)
- I Love Wing Chun (2011)
- Adventure of the King (2010)
- Flirting Scholar 2 (2010)
- 72 Tenants of Prosperity (2010)
- The Luckiest Man (2008)
- Beauty and the 7 Beasts (2007)
- Kung Fu Mahjong 3: The Final Duel (2007)
- Women on the Run (2005)
- Love Is a Many Stupid Thing (2004)
- Men Suddenly in Black (2003)
- The Conmen in Vegas (1999)
- Gigolo of Chinese Hollywood (1999)
- Tricky King (1998)
- L-O-V-E... Love (1997)
- Those Were the Days (1997)
- How to Meet the Lucky Stars (1996)
- Twinkle Twinkle Lucky Star (Yun cai zhi li xing) (1996)
- Dream Lover (1995)
- Burger Cop (1995)
- The Saint of Gamblers (1995)
- Modern Romance (1994)
- Perfect Exchange (1993)
- Flirting Scholar (1993)
- Last Hero in China (1993)
- Fight Back to School III (1993)
- Future Cops (1993)
- The Tigers: The Legend of Canton (1993)
- King of Beggars (1992)
- Ghost Punting (1992)
- Royal Tramp II (1992)
- Royal Tramp (1992)
- Fist of Fury 1991 II (1992)
- The Banquet (1991)
- Fist of Fury 1991 (1991)
- The Last Blood (1991)
- Tricky Brains (1991)
- Kung Fu VS Acrobatic (1991)
- Little Cop (1989)
- Funny Ghost (1989)
- Magic Crystal (1986)
- I Love Lolanto (1984)
- Carry On Pickpocket (1983)
- To Hell with the Devil (1982) as Rocky
- Chor Lau-heung (1979)
