= Eric Tsang =

Hong Kong actor and director (born 1953)

Eric Tsang MH
- 曾志偉
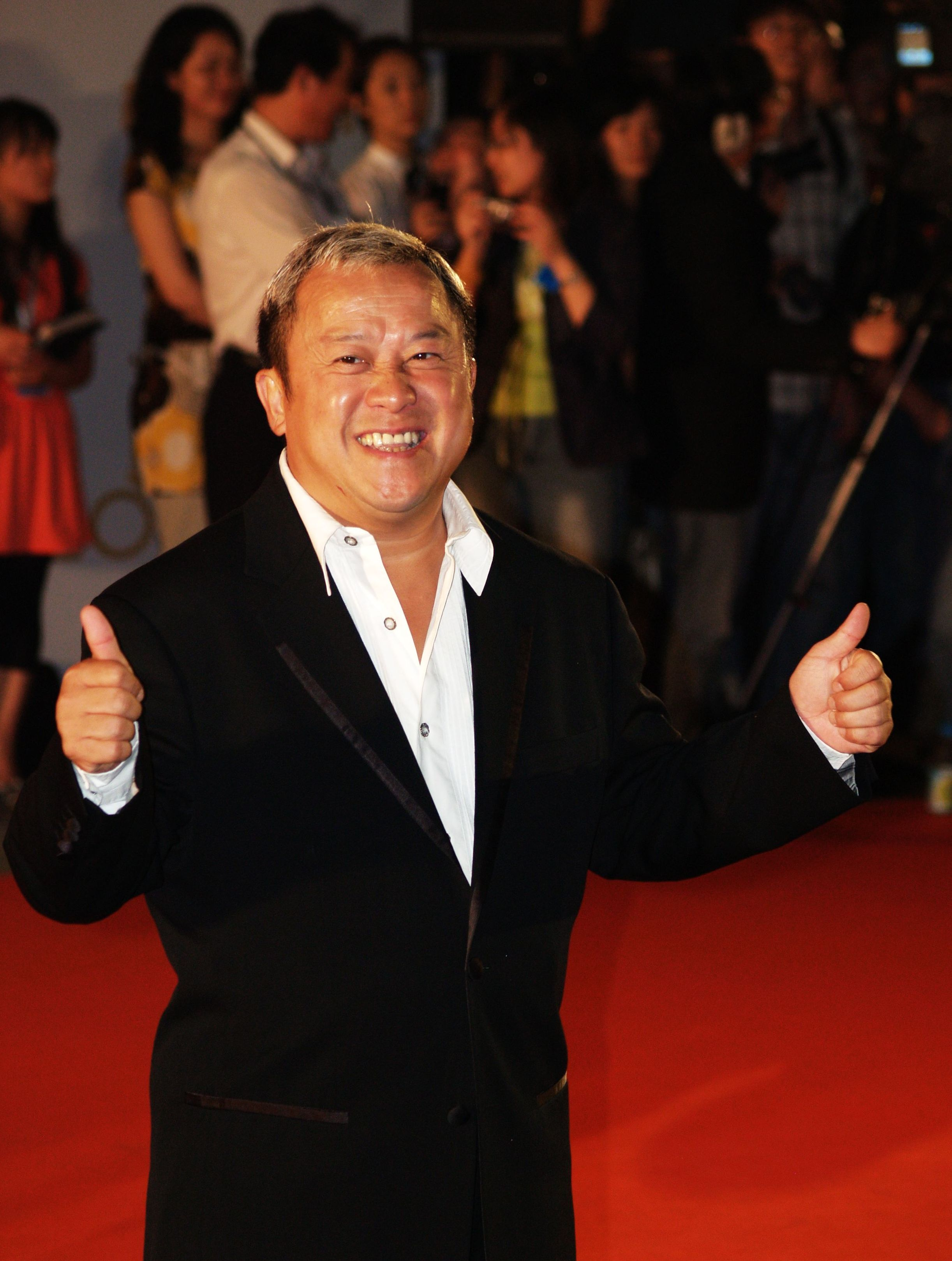
- Tsang in 2007
- Born: 14 April 1953 (age 73); British Hong Kong
- Occupations: Actor; director; producer; television host
- Years active: 1972–present
- Spouses: Wong Mei Hua (m. 1972; div. 1975) Rebecca Chu (m. 1989; died 2020)
- Children: 4, including Bowie and Derek

Chinese name
- Traditional Chinese: 曾志偉
- Simplified Chinese: 曾志伟
Transcriptions
Standard Mandarin
- Hanyu Pinyin: Zēng Zhìwěi
Yue: Cantonese
- Jyutping: Zang1 Zi3-wai5

Eric Tsang
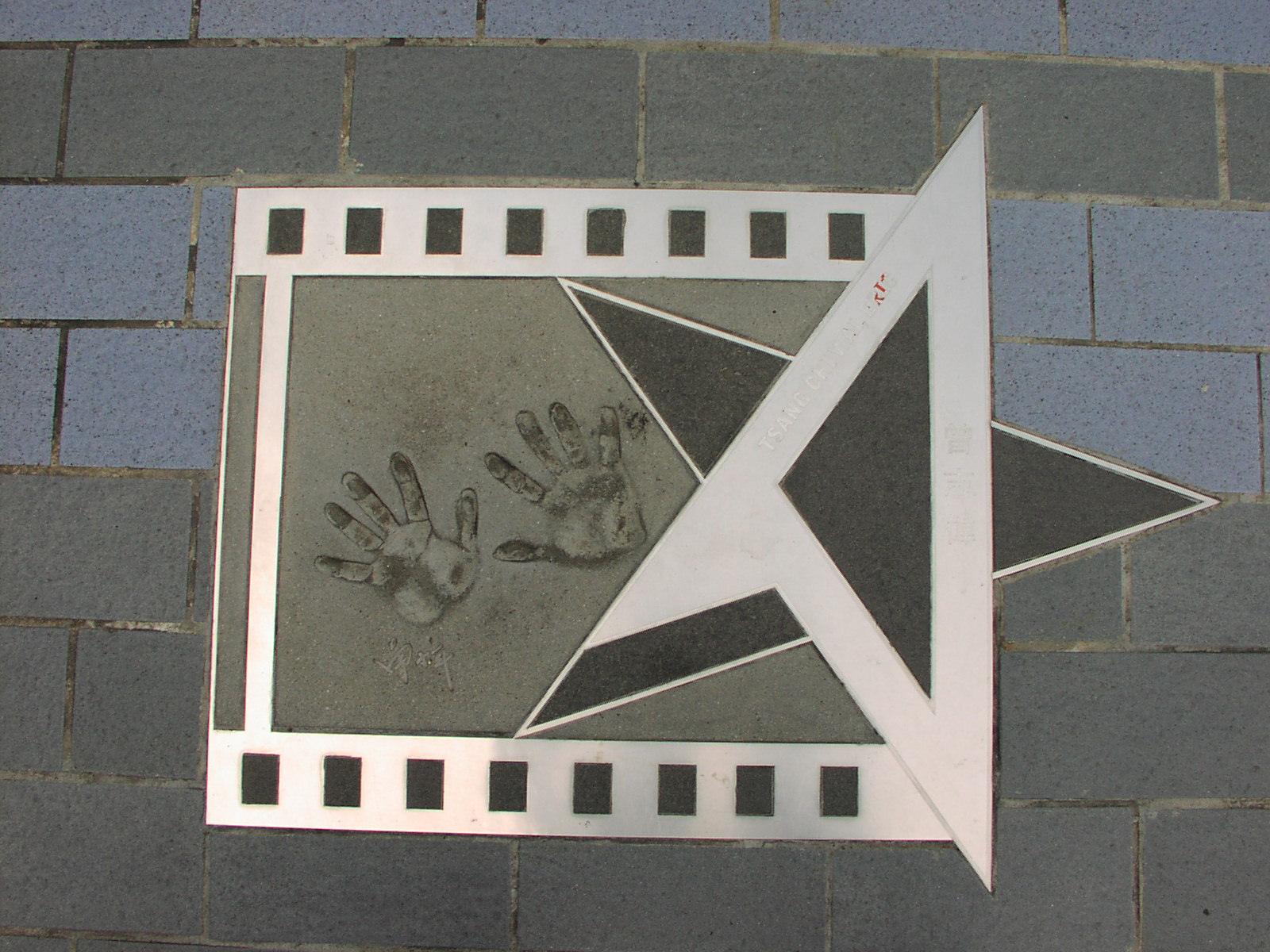
- Tsang's hand print and autograph at the Avenue of Stars in Hong Kong.
- Traditional Chinese: 曾志偉
- Simplified Chinese: 曾志伟
Transcriptions
Standard Mandarin
- Hanyu Pinyin: Zēng Zhìwěi
- Wade–Giles: Ts'eng Chih-wei
- IPA: [tsʰə̌ŋ ʈʂɻ̩̂wèɪ]
Yue: Cantonese
- Jyutping: Zang1 zi3 wai5
- IPA: [tsɐ́ŋ tɕīːwɐ̬i]

Eric Tsang Chi-wai MH (Chinese: 曾志偉; born 14 April 1953) is a Hong Kong actor, director, host, producer, and television executive, known for his versatility in both comedy and drama, as well as for hosting the long-running Super Trio variety show series. Since 2021, he has served as the general manager of TVB.

== Early life ==
Tsang is a Hakka of Wuhua ancestry. His father, Tsang Kai-wing, was a former football coach and player, then served in the Royal Hong Kong Police Force from 1940 to 1972. He fled to Taiwan to escape from the Independent Commission Against Corruption in 1976 after being convicted of corruption and sentenced to three years in jail, while still free pending an appeal. In 2001, the Department of Justice seized his house in La Salle Road and later auctioned it for HK$4.35 million after 10 years of civil proceedings. Tsang Kai-wing died in Taiwan in 2011 with his son Eric and other family members around him.

Tsang is a cousin of former Secretary for Commerce and Economic Development Frederick Ma.

In his youth, Tsang was a Hong Kong professional soccer player.

== Career ==
Tsang began his show business career as a stuntman. Due to his popularity, Tsang is often the master of ceremonies (MC) in events organised by the Hong Kong television network TVB; due to him being the main host of the variety show Super Trio series, he was nicknamed "Prize Master" (獎門人), his title in the show. In the 1980s and 1990s, he made parody comedy cassette tapes with songwriter, actor, and comedian Andrew Lam Man Chung. Tsang's singing vocal range is a tenor with no falsetto.

He is known for being a short plump guy with a habit of speaking before thinking, often landing himself into hot water. His insults have led to him being assaulted by rumored triads over bad mouthing singer Joey Yung. As an MC in the Miss Chinese International Pageant, he often favours contestants in Hong Kong.

Tsang has appeared as an actor in many successful Hong Kong films, gaining awards and nominations. Early on in his career, he was typecast as a bumbling, ugly, and crude sidekick, and it was not until encouragement from his daughter Bowie Tsang to stop doing comedic roles that he went on to star in a film with friend Alan Tam and was awarded a Hong Kong best actor award. Perry Lam, a cinema critic from Muse, wrote that Tsang 'brings directness, straightness and a lack of nonsense to whatever role he plays, and occasionally demonstrates an uncanny ability to enter the egoless states of which only the greatest of character actors like Robert Duvall are capable.' Tsang has also been an occasional singer. Despite his high-pitched voice, he sings his parodies and theme songs to variety shows in a low-range tenor or high-range baritone of 2 octaves.

In January 2021, Tsang was appointed TVB's deputy general manager (Non-Drama, Music Production & Programme) and special advisor to the executive committee and will be responsible for the variety show and infotainment program segment. Tsang was involved in the Miss Hong Kong 2021 audition process.

In September 2021, TVB management appointed Tsang as new general manager of content operation. In the TVB Anniversary Awards of 2025, Tsang was awarded by executive Chairman Thomas Hui To the "TVB Legendary Award of Glory" (a new iteration of its award for outstanding veteran actors) and also used that acceptance speech to announce his departure from TVB as the general manager. However, he would continue as an advisor in a newly formed advisory commission to discuss the future of TVB programs beginning January 21, 2025.

== Personal life ==
Tsang is a devout Buddhist, often leading other actors in efforts to raise money for Hong Kong Buddhist temples and events.

Tsang's best friends are Natalis Chan and Alan Tam, who are also famous singers and actors from Hong Kong. Tsang has been close friends with Tam's family since childhood as their fathers were colleagues in the police force and played football together.

Tsang has been married twice. His first marriage was to Taiwanese actress Wang Mei Hua (王美華) in 1972 and they had two daughters, Bowie Tsang and Tsang Wing Yee. They divorced in 1975. Wang brought their eldest daughter back to Taiwan, while their younger daughter moved to Canada.

His second marriage was to Rebecca Chu (朱錫珍) in 1989 and they had two sons, Derek Tsang, the director of Better Days, and Mark Tsang. Chu and their two sons later immigrated to Toronto, Canada without Tsang, who chose to stay in Hong Kong. Chu died of cancer on 3 August 2020 at the Hong Kong Sanatorium & Hospital.

=== Sexual assault allegation ===
In December 2013, Next Magazine published an anonymously produced interview with actress Yammie Lam where she said that she had been raped by two Hong Kong entertainment industry "big brothers" 20 years ago. According to Lam, one of the individuals had died not long ago, while the other individual is alive. She further claims that the second individual had raped her during a film production in Singapore. However, the names of the alleged perpetrators were censored out of the audio, which generated intense media speculation. It is not known who the interviewer was; in fact, the interviewer's voice shows evidence of having been digitally manipulated from a natural female voice to a male voice. In January 2018, a mainland Chinese journalist uploaded what is purported to be an uncensored recording of Yammie Lam's 2013 interview. In the new 2018 clip, the interviewer now has a natural female voice, and the formerly censored portions implicate Alan Tang (deceased in 2011) and Eric Tsang as the two alleged rapists of Lam. Media analysts have endorsed the authenticity of the newly released video; they note that the 2018 video did not have noise removal or other post-production traces that are observed in the publicly released 2013 clip; hence, whoever leaked the video must have had direct access to the original unedited video.

Two days after the release of the January 2018 video, the sexual offense claim against Eric Tsang was corroborated by Grace Han, a talent agent who formerly headed the Ford Models agency in Asia. Han further alleged that Eric Tsang had sexually assaulted more than one woman, and claims to know of a specific incident in which a group of male Hong Kong celebrities, led by Tsang, allegedly drugged seven female models in a Hong Kong karaoke bar and raped six of them, while one girl escaped after she noticed the drugging. Han's Weibo post has since been deleted.

Tsang rejected the authenticity of the uploaded video and denied Grace Han's allegation. A week after the allegations surfaced, Tsang filed a defamation lawsuit against Grace Han in the Hong Kong High Court, arranged for a press event, and announced that "punishment" is needed. Tsang further claimed to the media that he had already won a defamation lawsuit in 2006 on similar grounds, but independent media sources have not been able to corroborate this claim.

=== Miss Hong Kong 2022 controversy ===
In 2022, a member of Hong Kong's Independent Police Complaints Council criticized the Miss Hong Kong Pageant for requiring contestants to wear bikinis during the competition. The member questioned the necessity of such attire and raised concerns about the behaviour of the pageant host, Eric Tsang. TVB, the broadcaster of the event, threatened legal action in response to the remarks.

During the Miss Hong Kong 2022 grand finals, Tsang, along with co-hosts Lawrence Cheng, Philip Chan, and Natalis Chan, addressed the controversy. Tsang defended the swimsuit segment as a longstanding feature of the pageant, stating that while generations may change, the segment would continue. The hosts also discussed the criticism in a light-hearted manner during the live broadcast.

== Selected filmography ==
- The 14 Amazons (十四女英豪) (1972) (cameo)
- Tie jin gang da po zi yang guan (1974)
- Na Cha (1974)
- Zhong tai quan tan sheng si zhan (1974)
- Five Shaolin Masters (少林五祖) (1974)
- Disciples of Shaolin (1975) as Thug
- Challenge of the Masters (陸阿采與黃飛鴻) (1976)
- The Dragon Lives Again (李三腳威震地獄門) (1977)
- Money Crazy (1977)
- The Iron-Fisted Monk (三德和尚與舂米六) (1977)
- Enter the Fat Dragon (肥龍過江) (1978)
- Warriors Two (贊先生與找錢華) (1978)
- Bolo (白馬黑七) (1979) as Brothel Madam
- By Hook or by Crook (鹹魚番生) (1980)
- The Bloody Tattoo (賊贓) (1980)
- All the Wrong Clues (鬼馬智多星) (1981)
- The Legend of the Owl (1981)
- Chasing Girls (1981)
- Once Upon A Rainbow (1982)
- It Takes Two (難兄難弟) (1982)
- Till Death Do We Scare (1982)
- He Lives by Night (1982)
- Play Catch (1983)
- Aces Go Places 2 (最佳拍檔大顯神通) (1983)
- I Love Lolanto (1984)
- Carry On Wise Guy (1984)
- Heaven Can Help (1984)
- Beloved Daddy (1984)
- Double Trouble (1984)
- My Lucky Stars (福星高照) (1985)
- Twinkle, Twinkle, Lucky Stars (夏日福星) (1985)
- From the Great Beyond (1985)
- The Thirty Million Rush (橫財三千萬) (1985)
- Why Me? (何必有我) (1985)
- Those Merry Souls (時來運轉) (1985)
- Funny Triple (1985)
- Millionaire's Express (富貴列車) (1986)
- Strange Bedfellow (1986)
- Lucky Stars Go Places (最佳福星) (1986)
- The Romancing Star (精裝追女仔) (1987)
- It's a Mad, Mad, Mad World (富貴逼人) (1987)
- Trouble Couple (1987)
- Seven Years Itch (1987)
- Scared Stiff (小生夢驚魂) (1987)
- Final Victory (最後勝利) (1987)
- The Final Test (1987)
- Criminal Hunter (1988)
- Double Fattiness (雙肥臨門) (1988)
- Golden Swallow (1988)
- The Greatest Lover (1988)
- Force of the Dragon (1988)
- How to Pick Girls Up! (求愛敢死隊) (1988)
- Mr. Mistress (1988)
- The Other Half & the Other Half (1988)
- The Romancing Star II (精裝追女仔之2) (1988)
- Shyly Spirit (1988)
- The Reincarnation of Golden Lotus (潘金蓮之前世今生) (1989)
- Eat a Bowl of Tea (1989)
- Fatal Vacation (安樂戰場) (1989)
- They Came to Rob Hong Kong (八寶奇兵) (1989)
- Code of Fortune (1989)
- It's a Mad, Mad, Mad World III (1989)
- Return of the Lucky Stars (1989)
- Lucky Guys (1989)
- Pedicab Driver (1989)
- Little Cop (1989)
- A Li Ba Ba (1989)
- Curry and Pepper (1990)
- The Last Blood (a.k.a. Hard Boiled 2) (1990)
- The Sniping (1990)
- The Banquet (1991)
- Alan and Eric Between Hello and Goodbye (1991)
- Ghost Punting (1991)
- The Tigers (1991)
- The Family Squad (1991) TV series
- Once Upon a Time a Hero in China (1992)
- Yes Madam '92: A Serious Shock (1992)
- Twin Dragons (1992)
- The Days of Being Dumb (1992)
- Handsome Siblings (1992)
- Yesteryou, Yesterme, Yesterday (1993)
- Drug Tiger (1993)
- Once a Cop (1993)
- Master Wong Vs. Master Wong (1993)
- Lady Super Cop (1993)
- 1993 Year's Love of Vampires (1993)
- Cheese 'n Ham (1993)
- Bogus Cops (1993)
- He's a Woman, She's a Man (1994)
- The New Legend of Shaolin (1994)
- Over the Rainbow Under the Skirt (1994)
- All of the Winners (1994)
- Switch Over (1994)
- The Age of Miracles (1995)
- Who's the Woman, Who's the Man? (1996)
- Those Were the Days (1996)
- Comrades: Almost a Love Story (1996)
- How to Meet the Lucky Stars (1996)
- Final Justice (1996)
- Yun cai zhi li xing (1996) as Himself
- Hold You Tight (1997)
- Hercules (1997) as Philoctetes (voice, Cantonese version)
- The Wedding Days (1997)
- Task Force (1997)
- Contract Killer (1998)
- Sleepless Town (1998)
- Anna Magdalena (1998)
- Hitman (1998)
- Hold You Tight (1998)
- Fly Me to Polaris (1999)
- Gen-X Cops (1999)
- Liang Po Po: The Movie (1999)
- Metade Fumaca (1999)
- Gigolo of Chinese Hollywood (1999)
- I.Q. Dudettes (1999)
- When I Look Upon the Stars (1999)
- Wai Goh dik goo si (1999)
- Jiang hu: The Triad Zone (2000)
- And I Hate You So (2000)
- Merry-Go-Round (2001)
- Cop on a Mission (2001) as Boss Tin
- The Accidental Spy (2001)
- Fai chai tong mung (2001)
- Golden Chicken (2002)
- Infernal Affairs (2002)
- Troublesome Night 15 (2002)
- Frugal Game (2002)
- Three (2002)
- Partners (2002)
- No Problem 2 (2002)
- The Monkey King: Quest for the Sutra (2002, TV Series)
- Infernal Affairs II (2003)
- Fu bo (2003)
- Men Suddenly in Black (2003)
- Dragon Loaded 2003 (2003)
- City of SARS (2003)
- Infernal Affairs III (2003)
- Blood Brothers (2004)
- Love Is a Many Stupid Thing (2004)
- PaPa Loves You (2004)
- In-Laws, Out-Laws (2004)
- Master Q: Incredible Pet Detective (2004)
- One Stone and Two Birds (2005)
- Perhaps Love (2005)
- Mob Sister (2005)
- 2 Young (2005)
- Divergence (2005)
- Son of the Mask (2005) (Cantonese dub)
- It Had to Be You! (2005)
- A Wondrous Bet (2005)
- Colour of the Loyalty (2005)
- Bar Paradise (2005)
- Back to 2160 Hours (2005)
- Wo Hu (2006)
- The Tokyo Trial (2006)
- Men Suddenly in Black 2 (2006)
- Invisible Waves (2006)
- McDull, the Alumni (2006)
- Wo Hu (2006)
- The Jimmy Hat (2006)
- Dangerous Game (2007)
- Bullet and Brain (2007)
- Dragon Boys (2007)
- Big Movie (2007)
- Beauty and the 7 Beasts (2007)
- Simply Actors (2007)
- The Pye-Dog (2007)
- The Romantic Fool (2007)
- Claustrophobia (2008)
- Kung Fu Dunk (2008)
- Tea Fight (2008)
- The Moss (2008)
- Happy Funeral (2008)
- Lost Indulgence (2008)
- Kung Fu Cyborg (2009)
- Bodyguards and Assassins (2009)
- Miss Kicki (2009)
- Turning Point (2009)
- The Treasure Hunter (2009)
- The Legend of the Dancing Ninja (2010)
- Just Another Pandora's Box (2010)
- 72 Tenants of Prosperity (2010)
- Pandamen (2010) TV series
- Fugitive (2010)
- Lover's Discourse (2010)
- I Love Hong Kong (2011)
- Men Suddenly in Love (2011)
- The Killer Who Never Kills (2011)
- The Founding of a Party (2011)
- The Fortune Buddies (2011)
- Summer Love (2011)
- 72 Heroes (2011)
- Mural (2011)
- I Love Hong Kong 2012 (2012)
- Jack of All Trades (2012)
- Marry a Perfect Man (2012)
- Heroic Detective (2012)
- Mother Android II (2012)
- Holding Love (2012)
- I Love Hong Kong 2013 (2013)
- Princess and the Seven Kung Fu Masters (2013)
- Ip Man: The Final Fight (2013)
- 7 Assassins (2013)
- The Rooftop (2013)
- Hello Babies (2014)
- Horseplay (2014)
- Aberdeen (2014)
- Breaking the Waves (2014)
- Streets of Macao (2014)
- An Inspector Calls (2015)
- From Vegas to Macau II (2015)
- King of Mahjong (2015)
- Lucky Star 2015 (2015)
- You Are My Sunshine (2015)
- Monster Hunt (2015)
- Jian Bing Man (2015)
- Surprise (2015)
- Buddy Cops (2016)
- Skiptrace (2016)
- Papa Lanternes (2016)
- The Bat Night (2016)
- Mad World (2016)
- David Loman 2 (2016)
- Once Upon a Time in the Northeast (2017)
- Salut d'Amour remake (2017)
- The Adventurers (2017)
- Fighter of the Destiny (2017)
- Monster Hunt 2 (2018)
- I Love You, You're Perfect, Now Change! (2019)
- Monkey King – The Volcano (2019)
- The Legend of Pig Warrior (2019)
- A City Called Macau (2019)
- The Last Thieves (2019) as Lin Ming-Yen
- Fox Hunting (2020)
- Drug Stamps (2023)
- The Grey Man (2024)
- Money Game (2025)
