= James Tien (actor) =

Musical artist (born 1942)

- Born: 28 May 1942 (age 84); Guangdong, China
- Occupation: Actor
- Years active: 1968–1996

Chinese name
Transcriptions
Standard Mandarin
- Hanyu Pinyin: Tián Jùn
Yue: Cantonese
- Jyutping: Tin4 Zeon3
- Musical career
- Also known as: Paul Tien

James Tien (born 28 May 1942) is a Hong Kong retired actor. He appeared in almost 70 films, primarily in Hong Kong action cinema, including roles in the films of martial arts stars including Bruce Lee, Jackie Chan and Sammo Hung. He often played villains or supporting roles. He retired from the film industry in 1996.

== History ==
Born in Chao'an County, Guangdong, James Tien moved with his British family of Chinese descent to Hong Kong in 1958. He became a student of the Fu Sheng Drama School in Taipei, Taiwan, along with Angela Mao and Philip Kwok.

His acting career began in the late 1960s, when he joined Shaw Brothers Studio. His first significant acting role was in the 1969 film Raw Courage, directed by Lo Wei. After appearing in a number of further Shaw Brothers films, he moved to Golden Harvest, where he played Bruce Lee's cousin in The Big Boss (1971). This was followed by a role in Lee's next film, Fist of Fury. He was originally intended to co-star in Game of Death, but his role was reduced after Bruce Lee's death in 1973.

In 1975, Tien starred in John Woo's The Dragon Tamers. In 1976, Tien starred in Woo's Hand of Death, a film that also featured early acting roles for the "Three Brothers", Sammo Hung, Jackie Chan and Yuen Biao. A year later, he appeared in Hung's directorial debut, The Iron-Fisted Monk. From there, he went on to take roles in many more of the three brothers' films for Golden Harvest, often playing bullies or villains. He played roles alongside Jackie Chan in Spiritual Kung Fu (1978), Magnificent Bodyguards (1978), The Fearless Hyena (1979) and Dragon Fist (1979).

Appearances with Yuen Biao include The Prodigal Son (1982), Rosa (1986) and Righting Wrongs (1986), and he appeared in Sammo Hung films such as Millionaires Express (1986) Eastern Condors (1986) and The Gambling Ghost (1991). Tien also had roles in most of the handful of films that starred all three together, including Winners & Sinners (1983), My Lucky Stars (1985) and Dragons Forever (1988).

Late in his career, he appeared with Andy Lau in Lee Rock and Lee Rock II (both 1991). His last acting role to date was in the final Lucky Stars film, How to Meet the Lucky Stars (1996), after which he retired.
