= John Shum =

Hong Kong actor and film producer

John Sham
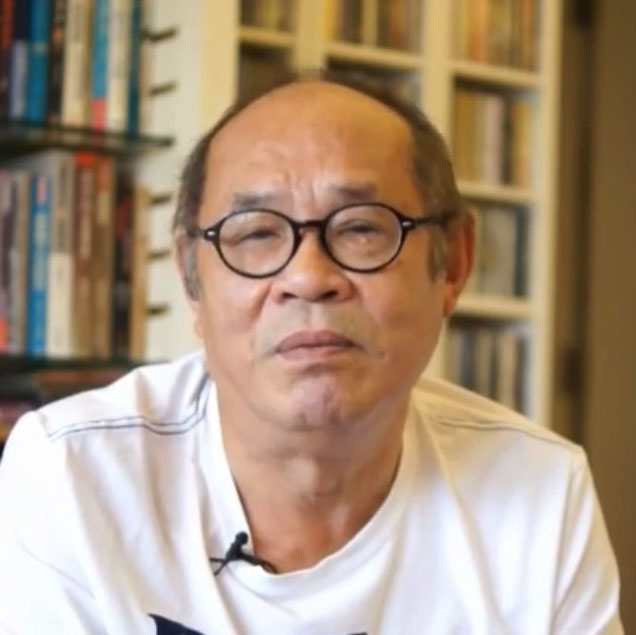
- Born: John Sham Kin-Fun; 1952 (age 73–74); Hong Kong
- Occupations: actor, producer
- Years active: 1980–present
- Spouse(s): Au Yim-cheung (m. 1970–75); Tina Lau (m. 1984–88); Shallin Tse (m. 1991–2005)
- Awards: Hong Kong Film Awards – Best Film; 1987 An Autumn's Tale

Chinese name
- Traditional Chinese: 岑建勳
- Simplified Chinese: 岑建勋
Transcriptions
Standard Mandarin
- Hanyu Pinyin: Cén Jiànxūn
Yue: Cantonese
- Jyutping: Sam4 Gin3 Fan1

John Sham Kin-Fun (Chinese: 岑建勳; Jyutping: Sam4 Gin3 Fan1; born 1952), commonly known as John Shum, is a Hong Kong actor, film producer, and political activist. He is best known for his contributions to the Hong Kong New Wave.

== Biography ==
Shum was educated in Hong Kong, the UK and the US. Upon his return to Hong Kong, he co-founded "City Magazine" with John Chan, and worked as its editor. At the same time, he began working in television and radio.

He was also a student activist in the 1970s back in his youth and was a member of a Trotskyist vanguard party the Revolutionary Marxist League.

In 1983, he set up the film production company D&B Films, along with Sammo Hung and Dickson Poon. He later founded another film company with John Chan, Maverick Films Ltd.

Sham's most prolific period working as an actor was during the 1980s. Of the 45 films he has appeared in, 33 were during this period. Notable appearances include Sammo Hung's Lucky Stars films Winners and Sinners (1983) and Twinkle, Twinkle Lucky Stars (1985), and starring roles alongside comedy partner Richard Ng in the Pom Pom series (1984–1986).

Sham is credited as a producer on over 20 films, including Hong Kong 1941 (1984), The Lunatics (1986), Legacy of Rage (1986) and The Banquet (1991). He also worked as an assistant director on the 1987 Michelle Yeoh film Magnificent Warriors and also has credits on a number of other films, with roles such as planning, executive production and presentation.

In 1992, Sham co-hosted the Hong Kong Film Awards ceremony.

Throughout much of the 1990s, films took a back seat as Shum was heavily involved with the Pro-Democracy movement in Hong Kong.

In 2005, he was appointed the Executive Secretary of the Federation of Hong Kong Filmmakers, by the government-sponsored Film Development Committee (FDC). In December 2007, he was enrolled as an executive committee member of the Hong Kong Performing Artistes Guild.

His latest role is as executive producer, alongside Jackie Chan, for the film Wushu (2008), which was directed by Antony Szeto and starred Sammo Hung.

== Filmography ==
=== Films ===
- A Complicated Story 一個複雜故事 (2013), actor
- A Simple Life 桃姐 (2011), actor
- Bodyguards and Assassins 十月圍城 (2009), actor
- Mr. Cinema 老港正傳 (2007), actor
- McDull, the Alumni 春田花花同學會(2006), actor
- New Police Story 新警察故事 (2004), actor
- The Miracle Box 天作之盒 (2004), actor
- King of Chess 棋王 (1991), actor
- Yes, Madam 一皇家師姐 (1985), actor
- Winners and Sinners 奇谋妙计五福星 (1983), actor
