= Charlie Chin =

Taiwanese actor

- 秦祥林
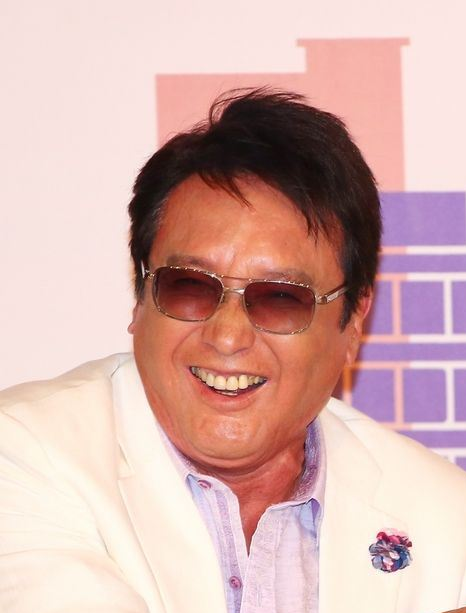
- Born: Chin Hsiang-lin; May 19, 1948 (age 78); Nanjing, Republic of China
- Citizenship: United States, Taiwan
- Education: Fu Xing Drama School
- Occupation: actor
- Years active: 1966–1991
- Era: 1968 - 1992
- Spouses: Josephine Siao (m. 1976; div. 1978) Cao Chang Li (m. 1988)
- Children: Gary Chin (son); Kevin Chin (son)
- Awards: Golden Horse Awards – Best Actor; 1975 Long Way from Home; 1977 At the Side of Skyline

Chinese name
- Chinese: 秦祥林
Transcriptions
Standard Mandarin
- Hanyu Pinyin: Qín Xianglín
Yue: Cantonese
- Jyutping: Ceon4 coeng4 lam4

Charlie Chin Hsiang-lin (Chinese: 秦祥林; pinyin: Qín Xianglín; Jyutping: Ceon4 coeng4 lam4) is a Taiwanese actor. He was born on May 19, 1948, in Nanking and grew up in Hong Kong. Throughout the twenty-four years of his acting career, Chin had participated in over one hundred films. As a member of the "Two Qins, Two Lins" (二秦二林), Charlie Chin is known for portraying the romantic interest of the female lead in a love triangle in Literary Romantic Films (愛情文藝片) in the 1970s. He received two Golden Horse Awards for his performance as best leading actor.

== Career ==
When he was young, Charlie Chin fled with his family to Hong Kong due to war. At the age of twelve, he went to Taiwan to pursue his studies at the Fu Xing Drama School (復興劇校; predecessor of National Taiwan College of Performing Arts), specializing in Peking Opera. He adopted the stage name Qin Fu Lin (秦復林) and selected the role of a combatant (武生) in the opera.

After graduating from the Fu Xing Drama School in 1968, Charlie Chin returned to Hong Kong and made some martial arts films, but he remained unknown. While he was wondering whether he should stay in the field of Peking Opera, actor Yue Hua (岳華) advised him to become an actor.

Charlie Chin was privately nicknamed "Flipper (翻跟斗)" due to his acrobatic skills in the film industry. At that time, the industry favored the warm-hearted type of male stars represented by Chin Han (秦漢), making it difficult for him to secure significant roles.

Charlie Chin was part of the "Silver Rat Squad (銀色鼠隊)", a 1970s pop band formed in Hong Kong. The band, consisting of seven members.was inspired by Hollywood actor Dean Martin's Rat Pack. The band was more of a lighthearted endeavor, and all the members were renowned actors at the time. The other members of the squad included Chan Chi Keung (陳自強), Zhang Chong (張沖), Patrick Tse Ka Yuk (謝賢), Alan Tang Kwong Wing (鄧光榮), Lydia Sum Tin Ha (沈殿霞), and Chen Hao (陳浩).

The turning point of Charlie Chin's acting career happened in 1973. Director Lee Hsing (李行) was shooting the film Heart With A Million Knots (心有千千結). The original male lead, Alan Tang Kwong Wing (鄧光榮), could not participate due to schedule conflict. Charlie Chin was recommended to Lee Hsing by Chen Chen's mother. So he took on the role of the male lead for the first time. The film made him a star overnight. This role also landed him the Best Actor award for Outstanding Performance at the 20th Asian Film Festival.

In the 1970s, literary romantic films adapted from romantic novels by Qiong Yao and other writers were extremely popular in Taiwan and South East Asia. During that time, Charlie Chin, along with renowned actors Chin Han (秦漢), Brigitte Lin (林青霞), and Joan Lin (林鳳嬌) were collectively called the "Two Qins, Two Lins" (二秦二林) to indicate their dominating status.

In 1975 and 1977, Charlie Chin won the Best Actor award at the 12th and 14th Golden Horse Awards, respectively, for his performances in Long Way from Home (長情萬縷) directed by Liu Yi (劉藝) and Far Away from Home (人在天涯) directed by Pai Ching-jui (白景瑞).

== Personal life ==
In 1973, Charlie Chin went to Japan to film the Hiroshima 28 (廣島廿八). It was during this time that he met actress Siao Fong Fong (蕭芳芳), and they began dating. In October 1975, they got married at the Hong Kong City Hall. However. Their marriage lasted only for a few years and they agreed to separate in 1977 and divorce in the following year.

In 1976, while filming Cloud of Romance (我是一片雲), Chin met Brigitte Lin (林青霞) and they began dating. In September 1980, they got engaged in Los Angeles. Their engagement lasted for four years and they were never married to each other.

Charlie Chin met his second wife Cao Chang-Li (曹昌莉) on a film set where she worked as a make-up assistant. They got married in 1988 and immigrated to California, United States afterward. They have two sons, Kavin and Gary Chin.

On November 23, 2013, Chin accepted an invitation from the Taipei Golden Horse Film Festival Executive Committee to serve as the presenter of the Lifetime Achievement Award at the 50th Golden Horse Award for Chen Chen.

== Filmography ==
Films
| Year | Chinese title | English title |
|---|---|---|
| 1968 | 《夏日初戀》 | Summer Love |
| 1969 | 《黑豹》 | The Black Panther |
| 1969 | 《一劍情深》 | The Violet Mansion |
| 1969 | 《蓮花寨》 | Lotus Camp |
| 1969 | 《龍吟虎嘯》 | The Challenge |
| 1969 | 《楓林渡》 | Mallow Forest |
| 1970 | 《異鄉客》 | The Unknown Swordsman |
| 1970 | 《火鳥第一號》 | Violet Clove and Firebird |
| 1970 | 《壯士血》 | King's Sword |
| 1970 | 《我愛莎莎》 | The Apartment |
| 1970 | 《雪路血路》 | Mission to Die |
| 1971 | 《浪子之歌》 | The Song of the Wanderer |
| 1971 | 《財色驚魂》 | Secret of My Millionaire Sister |
| 1971 | 《無敵鐵沙掌》 | Invincible Iron Palm |
| 1972 | 《男人女人》 | Love Affairs |
| 1972 | 《珮詩》 | Pei Shih |
| 1972 | 《騙術大觀》 | Cheating Panorama |
| 1972 | 《輕煙》 | Love Is Smoke |
| 1972 | 《三十六彈腿》 | Thirty-Six Kicks |
| 1973 | 《心有千千結》 | The Heart with a Million Knots |
| 1973 | 《女警察》 | Police Woman |
| 1973 | 《追殺》 | The Deadly Chase |
| 1973 | 《大密探》 | The Private Eye |
| 1974 | 《廣島廿八》 | Hiroshima 28 |
| 1974 | 《長情萬縷》 | Long Way from Home |
| 1974 | 《一簾幽夢》 | Yi Lian You Meng |
| 1974 | 《雪花片片》 | Falling Snow Flakes |
| 1974 | 《純純的愛》 | Love Love Love |
| 1974 | 《我父、我夫、我子》 | My Father, My Husband, My Son |
| 1974 | 《半山飄雨半山晴》 | Ban Shan Piao Yu Ban Shan Qing |
| 1974 | 《婚姻大事》 | The Marriage |
| 1974 | 《晴時多雲偶陣雨》/《好女十八變》 | How Is The Weather Today? |
| 1974 | 《雨中行》/《雨中漫步》 | Yu Zhong Xing |
| 1974 | 《東邊晴時西邊雨》 | Come Rain or Come Shine |
| 1975 | 《西貢、台北、高雄》 | Saigon, Taipei, Kaohsiung |
| 1975 | 《我心深處》 | Wo Xin Shen Chu |
| 1975 | 《戰地英豪》 | Heroes Behind the Enemy Lines |
| 1975 | 《煙雨》 | Misty Drizzle |
| 1975 | 《金雲夢》 | Jin Yun Meng |
| 1975 | 《長青樹》 | Evergreen Tree |
| 1975 | 《女朋友》 | Girlfriend |
| 1976 | 《追球.追求》 | The Chasing Game |
| 1976 | 《情話綿綿》 | Tainted Love |
| 1976 | 《夏日、假期、玫瑰花》 | Trio love |
| 1976 | 《微風細雨點點晴》/《奪愛》 | Wei Feng Xi Yu Dian Qing |
| 1976 | 《秋歌》 | Qiu Ge |
| 1976 | 《我是一沙鷗》 | Come Fly with Me |
| 1976 | 《今夜妳和我》/《就從今夜起》 | Starting Tonight |
| 1976 | 《我是一片雲》 | Cloud of Romance |
| 1976 | 《明天二十歲》 | Twenty Tomorrow |
| 1976 | 《不一樣的愛》/《愛的花蕾》 | Different Love |
| 1976 | 《星期六的約會》 | Date on Saturday |
| 1977 | 《異鄉夢》 | Yi Xiang Meng |
| 1977 | 《人在天涯》 | Far Away from Home |
| 1977 | 《愛的賊船》 | A Pirate of Love |
| 1977 | 《奔向彩虹》 | The Love Affair of Rainbow / Up to Rainbow |
| 1977 | 《風雲人物》 | Men on the Hour |
| 1977 | 《杜鵑花開時》 | Azaleo Blooming Season |
| 1977 | 《彩雲在飛躍》 | Love Across The Bridge |
| 1977 | 《不要在街上吻我》/《留學生》 | Don't Kiss Me on the Street |
| 1977 | 《佳期.假期》 | Holidays |
| 1977 | 《愛情雨花開》 | Qing Yu Hua Kai |
| 1977 | 《情深愛更深》 | Qing Shen Ai Geng Shen |
| 1977 | 《手足情深》/《拳王、情人、大律師》 | Boxer, Lover, Lawyer |
| 1978 | 《真白蛇傳》 | Love of the White Snake |
| 1978 | 《情竇初開》 | Young lovers |
| 1978 | 《踩在夕陽裡》 | Stepping in the Sunset |
| 1978 | 《金木水火土》 | Fearless Kung Fu Elements |
| 1978 | 《又是黃昏》 | Once More in the Evening |
| 1978 | 《月朦朧鳥朦朧》 | Moon Fascination, Bird Sweet |
| 1978 | 《男孩與女孩的戰爭》 | The War of the Sexes |
| 1978 | 《說謊世界》 | Con Artists |
| 1979 | 《一個女工的故事》 | Fly Up with Love |
| 1979 | 《昨日雨瀟瀟》 | The Misty Rain of Yesterday's |
| 1979 | 《摘星》 | Touch of Fair Lady |
| 1979 | 《成功嶺上》 | Cheng Gong Ling Shang |
| 1979 | 《難忘的一天》 | That Unforgettable Day |
| 1979 | 《一片深情》/《故人風雨》 | Return Of Monsoon |
| 1979 | 《落花、流水、春去也》 | Fallen Flowers, Flowing Water, the Spring Is Gone |
| 1980 | 《皇天后土》 | The Coldest Winter in Peking |
| 1980 | 《愛的小草》 | The Beloved Grass |
| 1980 | 《晚間新聞》 | Evening News |
| 1981 | 《愛殺》 | Love Massacre |
| 1981 | 《海軍與我》 | The Marine and I / Hai Jun Yi Wo |
| 1981 | 《凶榜》 | The Imp |
| 1982 | 《血戰大二膽》 | The Battle of Erdan |
| 1982 | 《殺出西營盤》 | Coolie Killer |
| 1983 | 《奇謀妙計五福星》/《五福星》 | Winners and Sinners |
| 1984 | 《最長的一夜》 | The Battle of Erdan 2 |
| 1984 | 《神勇雙響炮》 | Pom Pom |
| 1984 | 《上天救命》 | Heaven Can Help |
| 1985 | 《福星高照》 | My Lucky Stars |
| 1985 | 《夏日福星》 | Twinkle, Twinkle Lucky Stars |
| 1986 | 《八二三炮戰》 | The Kinmen Bombs |
| 1986 | 《日內瓦的黃昏》 | The Sunset in Geneva |
| 1987 | 《東方禿鷹》 | Eastern Condors |
| 1987 | 《大飯店》 | Grand Hotel |
| 1987 | 《褲甲天下》 | King Of Stanley Market |
| 1987 | 《亡命鴛鴦》 | On the Run |
| 1992 | 《五福星撞鬼》 | Ghost Punting |

TV shows
| Year | Chinese title | English title |
|---|---|---|
| 1986 | 《第四代》 | The 4th Generation |
| 1986 | 《金色山莊》 | Golden Mansion |
| 1987 | 《喜從天降》 | Xi Cong Tian Jiang |

== Awards ==
| Year | Award | Category | Work | Result |
|---|---|---|---|---|
| 1975 | The 12th Golden Horse Awards | Best Leading Actor | Long Way from Home | Won |
| 1977 | The 14th Golden Horse Awards | Best Leading Actor | Far Away from Home | Won |

== See also ==
- Lucky Stars
