= Wong Jing filmography =

This page contains the filmography of Wong Jing.

== Film ==
Year	Title	Chinese title	Role	Notes
1981	The Eagle's Killer	拜錯師父叩錯頭		Writer
1981	Dreadnaught	勇者無懼		a.k.a. Dreadnought; Writer
1981	Crazy Nuts	連環大鬥法		Writer
1981	The Crazy Chase	何方神聖		Writer
1981	Challenge of the Gamesters	千王鬥千霸	Mahjong Cheat	Also director and writer
1981	Treasure Hunters	龍虎小英雄		a.k.a. The Treasure Hunters a.k.a. Master of Disaster a.k.a. Brother Dragon Tiger; Writer
1981	One Way Only	單程路		Writer for story
1981	Notorious Eight	千門八將	Shed General	Writer
1981	Mahjong Heroes	打雀英雄傳		Writer
1982	Winner Takes All	賊王之王	Private Investigator Yeung	Director and writer
1982	Legend of a Fighter	霍元甲		Writer
1982	The Fake Ghost Catchers	鬼畫符		Writer
1982	Mercenaries from Hong Kong	獵魔者		Director and writer
1983	Shaolin Prince	少林傳人		a.k.a. Iron Fingers of Death a.k.a. Death Mask of the Ninja; Writer
1983	Hong Kong Playboys	花心大少		a.k.a. Hong Kong Playboy; Director and writer
1983	Mad, Mad, 83	瘋狂83		a.k.a. Mad Mad 1997; Writer
1983	Let's Make Laugh	表錯七日情	Security guard's manager	
1984	New Tales of the Flying Fox	新飛狐外傳		Writer
1984	Prince Charming	青蛙王子	Man in disco	Director and writer
1984	Wits of the Brats	南斗官三鬥北少爺	Mr. Blinker	Also co-director with Lau Kar Wing and Alexander Fu; Also writer
1984	Mr. Virgin	三十處男	Man in toilet	
1984	I Love Lolanto	我愛Lolanto	Fat Lung	Also director and writer
1984	Double Trouble	大小不良	Pawn Broker	
1984	Three Stooges Go Undercover	癲鳳狂龍		Writer
1985	The Young Vagabond	少年蘇乞兒		Writer
1985	The Flying Mr. B	鬼馬飛人	Liu Ben	Also director and writer
1985	Funny Face	醜小鴨		
1985	Fascinating Affairs	花心紅杏		Director
1985	Girl with the Diamond Slipper	摩登仙履奇緣	Fat Cat	a.k.a. Modern Cinderella; Also director and writer
1985	Twinkle Twinkle Lucky Stars	夏日福星	Himself	Cameo
1986	100 Ways to Murder Your Wife	殺妻二人組	Mr. Wang	a.k.a. Killing Wives Softly; Producer
1986	Lucky Stars Go Places	最佳福星	Tiny	a.k.a. My Lucky Stars Go Places a.k.a. The Luckiest Stars
1986	The Magic Crystal	魔翡翠	Pancho	Also director and writer
1986	The Ghost Snatchers	俾鬼捉	Chu Bong / Chu Hsi	
1986	The Seventh Curse	原振俠與衛斯理	Danny Wong	Cameo; Also producer
1986	The Innocent Interloper	流氓英雄	Black Jack	Cameo
1987	Evil Cat	凶貓	Inspector Handsome Wu	Also writer
1987	Born to Gamble	爛賭英雄	Skinny Tsing	Also director and writer
1987	The Romancing Star	精裝追女仔	Tour guide	Also director and writer
1987	The Thirty Million Dollar Rush	橫財三千萬	Pimp Tak	Cameo
1987	A Chinese Ghost Story	倩女幽魂	Judge	
1987	Trouble Couples	開心勿語	Teacher	
1987	You're My Destiny	用愛捉伊人	Mr. Wong	a.k.a. You Are My Destiny; Also writer
1988	The Romancing Star II	精裝追女仔之2	Simon Hand	a.k.a. The Romancing Star 2 Also director and writer
1988	Love Soldier of Fortune	愛的逃兵	Mr. Wong	
1988	The Crazy Companies	最佳損友	Himself	Cameo; Also director and writer
1988	Profiles of Pleasure	群鶯亂舞	Director Wong	
1988	Bet on Fire	火舞風雲	Man in white undies	
1988	Mr. Possessed	撞邪先生	Zhi's buddy	Director and writer
1988	How to Pick Girls Up!	求愛敢死隊	Xin Jiejing	a.k.a. How to Pick Up Girls; Also director and writer
1988	The Greatest Lover	公子多情	Expert Tung	
1988	Three Wishes	黑心鬼		
1988	The Dragon Family	龍之家族		Writer for story
1988	King of Stanley Market	褲甲天下		
1988	The Crazy Companies II	最佳損友闖情關		a.k.a. Crazy Companies II; Director and writer
1989	Perfect Match	最佳男朋友	Security guard	Producer and writer
1989	Ghost Fever	鬼媾人	Wong Siu-Cheong	Writer
1989	Doubles Cause Troubles	神勇雙妹嘜	Councilor Wang Heng Xin	Director and writer
1989	Return of the Lucky Stars	福星闖江湖	Sgt. Wong	Writer
1989	Vampire Buster	捉鬼大師		Writer
1989	Casino Raiders	至尊無上		Co-director with Jimmy Heung and writer
1989	Forever Young	返老還童		Writer
1989	The Iceman Cometh	急凍奇俠	Crane operator	
1989	Crocodile Hunter	專釣大鱷		Director, writer and producer
1989	Ghost Busting	嘩鬼有限公司		Writer
1989	God of Gamblers	賭神	Himself	Cameo; Also director and writer
1989	The Romancing Star III	精裝追女仔之3狼之一族	Dried Pork	a.k.a. The Romancing Star 3 Director, writer, and producer
1990	The Fortune Code	富貴兵團		Writer
1990	No Risk, No Gain	至尊計狀元才		Producer and writer
1990	My Neighbours Are Phantoms	嘩鬼住正隔籬		a.k.a. My Neighbours Are Phantoms! Also producer and writer
1990	Ghostly Vixen	天師捉姦		Producer and writer
1990	A Moment of Romance	天若有情		Planning
1990	Perfect Girls	靚足100分	Tsz's cousin	Also director and writer
1990	Kung Fu Vs. Acrobatic	摩登如來神掌		a.k.a. Kung Fu VS Acrobatic a.k.a. Thunderbolt '91; Writer
1990	The Big Score	絕橋智多星	Soft	Also director and writer
1991	God of Gamblers II	賭俠		Director and writer
1991	Tricky Brains	整蠱專家	Chi	Also director and writer
1991	The Last Blood	驚天12小時		a.k.a. Twelve Hours to Die; UK re-title: Hard Boiled 2 Director
1991	Money Maker	贏錢專家	Chu Cheung Fan	Also director, writer and producer
1991	Fight Back to School	逃學威龍		Producer
1991	God of Gamblers III: Back to Shanghai	賭俠2之上海灘賭聖		Director and writer
1991	Lee Rock	五億探長雷洛傳: 雷老虎		a.k.a. Lee Rock I Also producer
1991	Lee Rock II	五億探長雷洛傳II之父子情仇		a.k.a. Lee Rock 2 Also producer
1991	Queen of Underworld	夜生活女王霞姐傳奇		a.k.a. Queen of Under World a.k.a. Queen of the Underworld; Producer and writer
1991	The Banquet	豪門夜宴		Writer
1991	Dances with Dragon	與龍共舞		Director and writer
1992	Twin Dragons	雙龍會	Supernatural doctor	Uncredited
1992	Casino Tycoon	賭城大亨之新哥傳奇		Director, writer and producer
1992	Truant Heroes	逃學英雄傳		Director and producer
1992	Wizard's Curse	妖怪都市		Writer
1992	Royal Tramp	鹿鼎記		Co-director with Ching Siu-tung and writer
1992	Casino Tycoon II	賭城大亨II之至尊無敵		Director, writer and producer
1992	Deadly Dream Woman	女黑俠黃鶯		a.k.a. Deadly Dream Women; Producer
1992	She Starts the Fire	噴火女郎	writer, producer	a.k.a. She Starts Fire; Also producer and writer
1992	Royal Tramp II	鹿鼎記2神龍教		a.k.a. Royal Tramp 2 Co-director with Ching Siu-tung and writer
1992	To Miss With Love	逃學外傳		Producer
1992	Naked Killer	赤裸羔羊		Producer, writer and presenter
1993	Millionaire Cop	千面天王		Producer
1993	Wonder Girlfriend	特異女朋友		Producer
1993	Fight Back to School III	逃學威龍3之龍過雞年		Director and writer
1993	City Hunter	城市獵人		Director and writer
1993	Legend of the Liquid Sword	笑俠楚留香		Director and producer
1993	Last Hero in China	黃飛鴻之鐵雞鬥蜈蚣		a.k.a. Deadly China Hero a.k.a. Claws of Steel a.k.a. Iron Rooster Vs. Centipede; Also director and writer
1993	Flying Dagger	神經刀與飛天貓		Producer and writer
1993	Raped by an Angel	香港奇案之強姦		a.k.a. Naked Killer 2 Writer
1993	Holy Weapon	武俠七公主		Director
1993	Future Cops	超級學校霸王		Director and writer
1993	Boys Are Easy	追男仔		Director, writer and producer
1993	Kidnap of Wong Chak Fai	綁架黃七輝		Writer
1993	Perfect Exchange	至尊三十六計之偷天換日		a.k.a. The Sting 2 a.k.a. The Sting II; Also director and writer
1993	Ghost Lantern	人皮燈籠		Producer and writer
1993	Kung Fu Cult Master	倚天屠龍記之魔教教主		USA DVD release: Kung Fu Master; Also director and writer
1994	Reckless Barrister	流根大狀		Producer
1994	My Friend Roy	我友張來		Producer
1994	Who's My Father?	誰可相依		a.k.a. Who's My Father? Also writer for story
1994	The Underground Banker	香港奇案之吸血貴利王		Producer and presenter
1994	The New Legend of Shaolin	洪熙官	Himself	Cameo; Also director and writer
1994	Hail the Judge	九品芝麻官		Director and writer
1994	A Chinese Torture Chamber Story	滿清十大酷刑		Producer
1994	Modern Romance	戀愛的天空		Co-director with Lee Lik-Chi, Lam Wai-Lun, and Andrew Lau, writer, producer and presenter
1994	Return to a Better Tomorrow	新英雄本色		Director, writer and producer
1994	Long and Winding Road	錦繡前程		
1994	To Live and Die in Tsimshatsui	新邊緣人		Producer and presenter
1994	Sex and the Emperor	滿清禁宮奇案		Producer
1994	Whatever You Want	珠光寶氣		Director and writer
1994	God of Gamblers Returns	賭神2		Director and writer
1994	1941 Hong Kong on Fire	香港淪陷		Presenter
1995	My Father Is a Hero	給爸爸的信		a.k.a. The Enforcer a.k.a. My Father Is Hero; Writer, producer
1995	Lover of the Last Empress	慈禧秘密生活		Producer
1995	Dream Killer	野性的邂逅		Producer
1995	Teenage Master	小飛俠		a.k.a. My Father Is a Hero 2 Producer
1995	Tricky Business	整蠱王		Producer
1995	Mean Street Story	廟街故事		Producer and writer
1995	The Saint of Gamblers	賭聖2街頭賭聖		a.k.a. The Saint of the Gambler's; Director, writer and producer
1995	High Risk	鼠胆龍威		a.k.a. Meltdown; Director, writer and producer
1995	The Adventurers	大冒險家		a.k.a. The Great Adventurer; Executive producer
1995	Sixty Million Dollar Man	百變星君		Producer and writer
1995	Young Policemen in Love	新紮師兄追女仔		Producer
1995	I'm Your Birthday Cake	不道德的禮物		Producer and presenter
1996	Blind Romance	偷偷愛你		Producer
1996	Young and Dangerous	古惑仔之人在江湖		Producer and presenter
1996	Forbidden City Cop	大內密探零零發		Producer
1996	Twinkle Twinkle Lucky Star (Yun cai zhi li xing)	運財智叻星	Himself at horse track	Cameo; Director, writer and producer
1996	Sexy and Dangerous	古惑女之決戰江湖		Producer
1996	Sex and Zen II	玉蒲團II玉女心經		a.k.a. Sex and Zen 2 Producer
1996	Satan Returns	666 魔鬼復活		US DVD Title: Shaolin vs. The Devil's Omen a.k.a. Devil 666 a.k.a. Satan's Return; Also writer and presenter
1996	Ebola Syndrome	伊波拉病毒		Producer
1996	War of the Under World	洪興仔之江湖大風暴		a.k.a. Young and Magnificent a.k.a. War of the Underground a.k.a. War of the Underworld; Also producer and writer
1996	Bodyguards of Last Governor	港督最後一個保鑣		Writer and presenter
1996	Till Death Do Us Laugh	怪談協會		Producer
1997	God of Gamblers 3: The Early Stage	賭神3之少年賭神		Director, writer and producer
1997	24 Hrs Ghost Story	猛鬼通宵陪住你		a.k.a. 24 Hours Ghost Story; Producer
1997	We're No Bad Guys	愛上百份百英雄		a.k.a. We Are No Bad Guys; Director and writer
1997	Haunted Karaoke	猛鬼卡拉OK		Executive producer
1998	The Lucky Guy	行運一條龍	Fatty	Cameo
1998	Young and Dangerous 5	98 古惑仔之龍爭虎鬥		a.k.a. Young and Dangerous V Presenter
1998	Portland Street Blues	古惑仔情義篇之洪興十三妹		Presenter
1998	Step Into the Dark	夜半無人屍語時		Co-director with Dick Cho, writer and producer
1998	Raped by an Angel 2: The Uniform Fan	強姦2制服誘惑		Producer and presenter
1998	Sex and Zen III	玉蒲團III官人我要		Producer
1998	Her Name Is Cat	豹妹		a.k.a. The Huntress; Producer and writer
1998	The Love and Sex of the Eastern Hollywood	愛在娛樂圈的日子		Producer
1998	Young and Dangerous: The Prequel	新古惑仔之少年激鬥篇		Executive producer
1998	A True Mob Story	龍在江湖		Director, writer and producer
1998	Raped by an Angel 3: Sexual Fantasy of the Chief Executive	強姦3OL誘惑		Producer and presenter
1998	Love Generation Hong Kong	新戀愛世紀		Director, writer, producer and presenter
1998	Cheap Killers	愈墮落愈英雄		Producer, writer and presenter
1998	The Demon's Baby	猛鬼食人胎		Producer
1998	Tricky King	超級整蠱霸王		Producer and presenter
1998	A Chinese Torture Chamber Story II	滿清十大酷刑之赤裸凌遲	Producer	
1998	Your Place or Mine!	每天愛您8小時		Producer and presenter
1998	Mr. Wai-go	偉哥的故事		a.k.a. Mr. Viagra; Producer, writer and presenter
1998	The Conman	賭俠1999	Squirrel	Director, writer and producer
1998	Haunted Mansion	香港第1兇宅		Producer
1999	Raped by an Angel 4: The Rapist's Union	強姦終極篇之最後羔羊		Director, producer and writer
1999	The H.K. Triad	O 記三合會檔案		a.k.a. The Hong Kong Triad; Producer and writer
1999	Prince Charming	黑馬王子		Director, writer, producer and presenter
1999	Horoscope 1: The Voice from Hell	生人勿近之問米		Producer and presenter
1999	Erotic Nightmare	勾魂惡夢		Producer and presenter
1999	Body Weapon	原始武器		Producer
1999	Gigolo of Chinese Hollywood	電影鴨		Producer
1999	The Conmen in Vegas	賭俠大戰拉斯維加斯	Handsome Wu	Also director, producer and writer
1999	The Tricky Master	千王之王2000	Ferrari	Also director, producer and writer
1999	Century of the Dragon	龍在邊緣		a.k.a. Gods, Gangsters and Gamblers; Producer, writer and presenter
2000	Crying Heart	笨小孩		Director, producer and writer
2000	Fist Power	生死拳速		Producer
2000	My Name Is Nobody	賭聖3無名小子	Uncle Lo	Also producer and writer
2000	The Duel	決戰紫禁之巔		Producer and writer
2000	Sausalito	一見鍾情		a.k.a. Love at First Sight; Presenter
2000	Don't Look Back... Or You'll Be Sorry!!	唔該借歪!!		Producer and presenter
2000	Conman in Tokyo	中華賭俠		Producer and presenter
2000	Healing Hearts	俠骨仁心		Presenter
2001	Martial Angels	絕色神偷	Fred	
2001	Everyday Is Valentine	情迷大話王		Director, writer and producer
2001	Cop Shop Babes	靚女差館	Dr. Auyeung	
2001	My School Mate, the Barbarian	我的野蠻同學		Co-director with Billy Chung, producer and writer
2001	A Gambler's Story	一個爛賭的傳說		Producer
2001	Love Me, Love My Money	有情飲水飽		Director, writer and producer
2001	Shadow	幽靈情書		Producer
2001	The Avenging Fist	拳神		Producer
2002	The Wesley's Mysterious File	衛斯理藍血人	Dr. Kwok	Cameo; Also producer and writer
2002	The Irresistible Piggies	豬扒大聯盟		Producer and writer
2002	Conman 2002	賭俠2002		a.k.a. The Conman 2002; Producer
2002	Naked Weapon	赤裸特工		Producer and writer
2002	The New Option	飛虎雄師		Presenter
2002	The New Option - Run and Shoot	飛虎雄師之中環茶室兇殺案		U.S. Title: The New Option - Kill in Central Restaurant; Presenter
2003	Sex and the Central	色慾中環		Presenter
2003	Raped by an Angel 5	強姦5之廣告誘惑		Presenter
2003	2003 Chik Lo Tin Sai	2003 赤裸天使		China Mainland release of 1995 film Angel Heart; Presenter
2003	The New Option - Puppet Hon	飛虎雄師之邊緣人		U.S. Title: The New Option - Undercover; Presenter
2003	The New Option - Saviour	飛虎雄師之救世者		Presenter
2003	The New Option - The Syndicate	飛虎雄師之再戰江湖		U.S. Title: The New Option: Back to Battle; Presenter
2003	The New Option - The Campaign	飛虎雄師之槍王行動		Presenter
2003	The New Option - Confrontation	飛虎雄師之點指兵兵		a.k.a. The New Option - Sniper; Presenter
2003	The New Option - The Revenge	飛虎雄師之復仇		U.S. Title: The New Option - Assassin; Presenter
2003	The New Option - Gold Rush	飛虎雄師之劫金風暴		a.k.a. The New Option - Assault Team; Presenter
2003	The New Option - The Final Showdown	飛虎雄師之英雄本色		U.S. Title: The New Option - Point of No Return; Presenter
2003	Cat and Mouse	老鼠愛上貓		Presenter
2003	Honesty	絕種好男人	Passenger on MRT platform	Director, writer and producer
2003	Kung Fu Master Is My Grandma!	我的婆婆黃飛鴻		Producer
2003	Colour of the Truth	黑白森林		Co-director with Marco Mak, writer and producer
2003	The Spy Dad	絕種鐵金剛		Director, writer and producer
2004	Sex and the Beauties	性感都市		Director, writer and producer
2004	Moving Targets	2004 新紮師兄		Director, writer and producer
2004	Love Is a Many Stupid Thing	精裝追女仔2004	Ray's uncle	Also o-director with Go Sin-Ming, writer and producer
2005	Slim till Dead	瘦身	William Hung	Also producer and writer
2005	Colour of the Loyalty	黑白戰場		Co-director with Billy Chung, writer and producer
2005	Set Up	凶男寡女		Also producer and writer
2005	Kung Fu Mahjong	雀聖	"Tin Kau Ko"	Also c-director with Billy Chung, writer and producer
2005	Kung Fu Mahjong 2	雀聖2自摸天后	Tin Kau Ko	Also director
2006	My Kung-Fu Sweetheart	野蠻秘笈	Itchiban	Also director, writer and producer
2006	Don't Open Your Eyes	鬼眼刑警		Presenter
2006	Dating a Vampire	愛上屍新娘		Writer
2006	Wo Hu	臥虎		a.k.a. Operation Undercover a.k.a. Undercover Tiger; Producer, writer and presenter
2006	Wise Guys Never Die	提防老千	Teddy Chan	Also director, writer and producer
2007	Kung Fu Mahjong 3 - The Final Duel	雀聖3自摸三百番		Producer, writer and presenter
2007	The Lady Iron Chef	美女食神	Souza	Producer and writer
2007	Bullet and Brain	神槍手與智多星		Producer, writer and presenter
2007	Beauty and the 7 Beasts	七擒七縱七色狼		Producer and presenter
2008	Hong Kong Bronx	黑勢力		Producer
2008	My Wife Is a Gambling Maestro	我老婆係賭聖		Director and producer
2008	The Vampire Who Admires Me	有隻僵屍暗戀你		a.k.a. My Secret Admirer Is a Vampire a.k.a. King Zombie; Producer and writer
2008	The Underdog Knight	硬漢		a.k.a. Ying Han; Producer and presenter
2009	I Corrupt All Cops	金錢帝國		Director, writer, producer and presenter
2009	Night and Fog	天水圍的夜與霧		Presenter
2009	On His Majesty's Secret Service	大內密探靈靈狗		Director, writer, producer and presenter
2009	To Live and Die in Mongkok	旺角監獄		Co-director with Billy Chung, writer, producer and presenter
2009	Huo Xing Bao Bei	火星沒事		a.k.a. Mars Is OK
2010	Black Ransom	撕票風雲		a.k.a. Colour of Justice a.k.a. Mutant Cops; Co-director with Venus Keung, writer and producer
2010	Beauty on Duty!	美麗密令		a.k.a. Love Undercover 4 Director
2010	Future X-Cops	未來警察		Director and writer
2011	Men Suddenly in Love	猛男滾死隊		Director, writer and producer
2011	Treasure Inn	財神客棧		Co-director with Corey Yuen and writer
2011	Treasure Hunt	無價之寶		Director and writer
2011	Hong Kong Ghost Stories	猛鬼愛情故事		Co-director with Patrick Kong and producer
2012	Mr. and Mrs. Gambler	爛賭夫鬥爛賭妻		Director
2012	Marrying Mr. Perfect	嫁個100分男人		Director
2012	Naked Soldier	絕色武器		Producer and writer
2012	The Last Tycoon	大上海		Director and writer
2013	Young and Dangerous: Reloaded	古惑仔:江湖新秩序		Producer
2013	Princess and the Seven Kung Fu Masters	笑功震武林		Director, producer and writer
2013	A Secret Between Us	第一次不是你		producer
2013	A Chilling Cosplay	制服		Producer and presenter
2014	From Vegas to Macau	賭城風雲		Director and writer
2014	Naked Ambition 2	3D豪情	Himself	Cameo
2015	From Vegas to Macau II	賭城風雲II		Director
2015	Lost in Hong Kong	港囧	Himself	Cameo
2016	From Vegas to Macau III	賭城風雲III		Co-director with Andrew Lau
2016	Mission Milano	王牌逗王牌		Director
2016	The Gang Leader			
2017	The Golden Monk	降魔傳		Co-director with Billy Chung Siu-Hung
2017	Chasing The Dragon	追龍		Co-director with Jason Kwan, producer, writer
2018	Big Brother	大師兄		Producer
2019	She's a Man. He's a Woman	好汉三条半 / 猛男三条半		Actor, producer, presenter
2019	Chasing the Dragon II: Wild Wild Bunch	追龍II：賊王		Co-director with Jason Kwan, producer, writer
2020	Enter the Fat Dragon	肥龍過江	Thor	Producer, writer
2021	Once Upon a Time in Hong Kong	金錢帝國		Director, writer, producer
2022	New Kung Fu Cult Master 1	倚天屠龍記之九陽神功		Director, writer, producer
2022	New Kung Fu Cult Master 2	倚天屠龍記之聖火雄風		Director, writer, producer
2022	Hit Team	重裝戰警		Writer, producer
2022	Queen of Triads	老闆娘2無間潛行		Writer, producer
2023	Sakra	天龙八部之乔峰传		Producer
2023	Queen of Triads 3	老闆娘3		Writer, producer
2025	Queen of Mahjong	麻雀女王追男仔		Co-Director

== Television series ==
Year	Title	Chinese Title	Role	Notes
1979	The Good, the Bad and the Ugly	網中人		Writer
1980	The Shell Game	千王之王		Writer
1981	The Misadventure of Zoo	流氓皇帝		Writer
2000	The Duke of Mount Deer 2000	小寶與康熙		Director and producer
2000	Showbiz Tycoon	影城大亨		Director
2001	The New Adventures of Chor Lau-heung	新楚留香		Director
2005	The Proud Twins	小魚兒與花無缺		Director and writer
2005	Central Affairs	情陷夜中環		Producer
2005	The Royal Swordsmen	天下第一		Writer
2006	Eight Heroes	八大豪侠		Director and writer
2006	Fox Volant of the Snowy Mountain	雪山飛狐		Producer
2006	Phoenix from the Ashes	浴火鳳凰		Co-director with Chung Siu Hung and producer
2007	Project A	A計劃	Tang Lang	Also main director
2007	Bao Yu Li Hua	暴雨梨花		Director and writer
2008	Shi Da Qi Yuan	十大奇冤		Director and producer
2015	Master of Destiny	風雲天地		Producer, director and writer
