= Casino Tycoon =

Casino Tycoon may refer to:

- Casino Tycoon (film), a 1992 Hong Kong film
  - Casino Tycoon 2, a 1992 sequel to the film
- Casino Tycoon (video game), a 2001 video game
