= The Romancing Star =

1987 Hong Kong film by Wong Jing

- Film poster

Chinese name
- Traditional Chinese: 精裝追女仔
- Simplified Chinese: 精装追女仔
Transcriptions
Standard Mandarin
- Hanyu Pinyin: Jīng Zhuāng Zhuī Nǚ Zǎi
Yue: Cantonese
- Jyutping: Zing1 Zong1 Zeoi1 Neoi2 Zai2
- Directed by: Wong Jing
- Screenplay by: Wong Jing
- Produced by: Wallace Cheung
- Starring: Chow Yun-fat; Eric Tsang; Natalis Chan; Stanley Fung; Maggie Cheung
- Cinematography: David Choi
- Edited by: Robert Choi
- Music by: Sherman Chow
- Production companies: Win's Movie Production; Ngan Lung Films; Mei Lam Films; Movie Impact
- Distributed by: Win's Entertainment; Gala Film Distribution Limited
- Release date: 25 June 1987
- Running time: 103 minutes
- Country: Hong Kong
- Language: Cantonese
- Box office: HK$21,720,626

The Romancing Star (Chinese: 精裝追女仔) is a 1987 Hong Kong romantic comedy film written and directed by Wong Jing and starring Chow Yun-fat, Eric Tsang, Natalis Chan, Stanley Fung and Maggie Cheung. The film was followed by two sequels The Romancing Star II, released in the following year and The Romancing Star III, released the year after.

== Plot ==
Fred (Chow Yun-fat), a vulgar car repairer, works at a garage together with his two close buddies Tony (Natalis Chan) and Silver (Eric Tsang). The boss of the garage, Ken (Stanley Fung) puts his friendship with the three in priority, ultimately, despite his calculating, harsh, picky and dingy personality. Both Tony and Silver couldn't put up with the snobbish mother of Fred's girlfriend, Ah Man (Sharla Cheung) thus stirring up troubles on the occasion of her birthday banquet forcing Fred breakup with Ah Man. In order to recover the heartbreak of Fred, Ken decided to cheer him up by joining a tour to Penang, where they came across two beautiful girls, Maggie (Maggie Cheung) and Agnes (Agnes Cheung), strolling leisurely on the beach as if they were very wealthy. Since then they decided on courtship. They played a poker game to decide who's to who. As fate would've decided, winner Fred has chosen Maggie to be his sole target. By the rules of the game, Ken, Tony and Silver have to compete and see who, in the end, will win the heart of Agnes. Maggie and Fred still keep in contact with each other following their return from the trip. One night, Fred decided to invite Maggie to a ball, where she was instantly attracted by a wealthy bachelor called Chiu Ting-sin (Stuart Ong). Fred couldn't tolerate with Chiu's inappropriate acts towards Maggie and he deliberately tricks him, causing the two to incur hatred at each other. To take revenge on Fred, Chiu hired Maggie and Agnes for commercial shootings, and sent his car to the garage where Fred works, thus to expose his real identity as a car repairer to Maggie. Deceived by Fred, Maggie bursted away in a fit of anger and sadness. Chiu was preparing to throw an in-house party to welcome Maggie and Agnes as his guests, but then, he was having a hidden agenda. Fred and his friends were accused of storing drugs and were prisoned. After learning about the intention Chiu is attempting, he and the friends underwent a plan to sneak into the house party and rescue Maggie and Agnes. When Maggie finds out that Chiu actually has an ulterior motive for her, she broke up with him and accepted Fred's confession and apology, as a result, Maggie and Fred got married.

== Cast ==
- Chow Yun-fat as Fred Wong Yat-fat
- Eric Tsang as Silver / Ugly
- Natalis Chan as Tony / Traffic Light
- Stanley Fung as Ken Lau Ting-kin
- Maggie Cheung as Maggie Tung Man-yuk
- Agnes Cheung as Agnes Lee Man-chi
- Stuart Ong as Chiu Ting-sin
- Sharla Cheung as Man
- Wong San as Mr. Due
- Leung San as Mrs. Due
- Keung Chung-ping as Chiu Ting-sin's Sifu (cameo)
- Charlie Cho as One of Mr. Chiu's Employee (cameo)
- Anthony Chan as One of Mr. Chiu's Employee (cameo)
- Carol Cheng as Susan (cameo)
- Philip Chan as Kenny
- Wong Jing as Tour guide
- Wong Tin-lam as Maggie's father
- Soh Hang-suen as Maggie's mother
- Ha Kwok-wing as One of Mr Chiu's Guards
- Thomas Sin as One of Mr Chiu's Guards
- Maria Cordero as orange dance contestant
- Suki Kwan as Chu
- Leung Hak-shun as Chu's father
- Cheung Kwok-wah as masked stripper
- Seung Koon-yuk as Mrs. Kam
- Wang Han-chen as street vendor
- Chan Wai-yue as orange dance contestant
- Anna Kamiyama as waits for boyfriend with Ferrari
- Shing Fuk-n as A Better Tomorrow ending extra
- Shing Fui-On as A Better Tomorrow ending extra
- Ng Kwok-kin as policeman
- Yat-oon Chai as policeman
- Cheung Yuen-wah as Ferrari Wong
- Mau Kin-tak as Ferrari's boyfriend / Tourist
- Che Hung as toilet attendant
- Ho Chi-moon as Mr. Due's banquet guest
- Chin Tsi-ang as mahjong player
- Sherman Wong as Ho/ Traffic policeman

== Box office ==
The film grossed HK$21,720,626 at the Hong Kong box office during its theatrical run from 25 June to 8 July 1987 in Hong Kong.

== See also ==
- Chow Yun-fat filmography
- Wong Jing filmography
