= Chingmy Yau =

Hong Kong actress

- Chinese: 邱淑貞
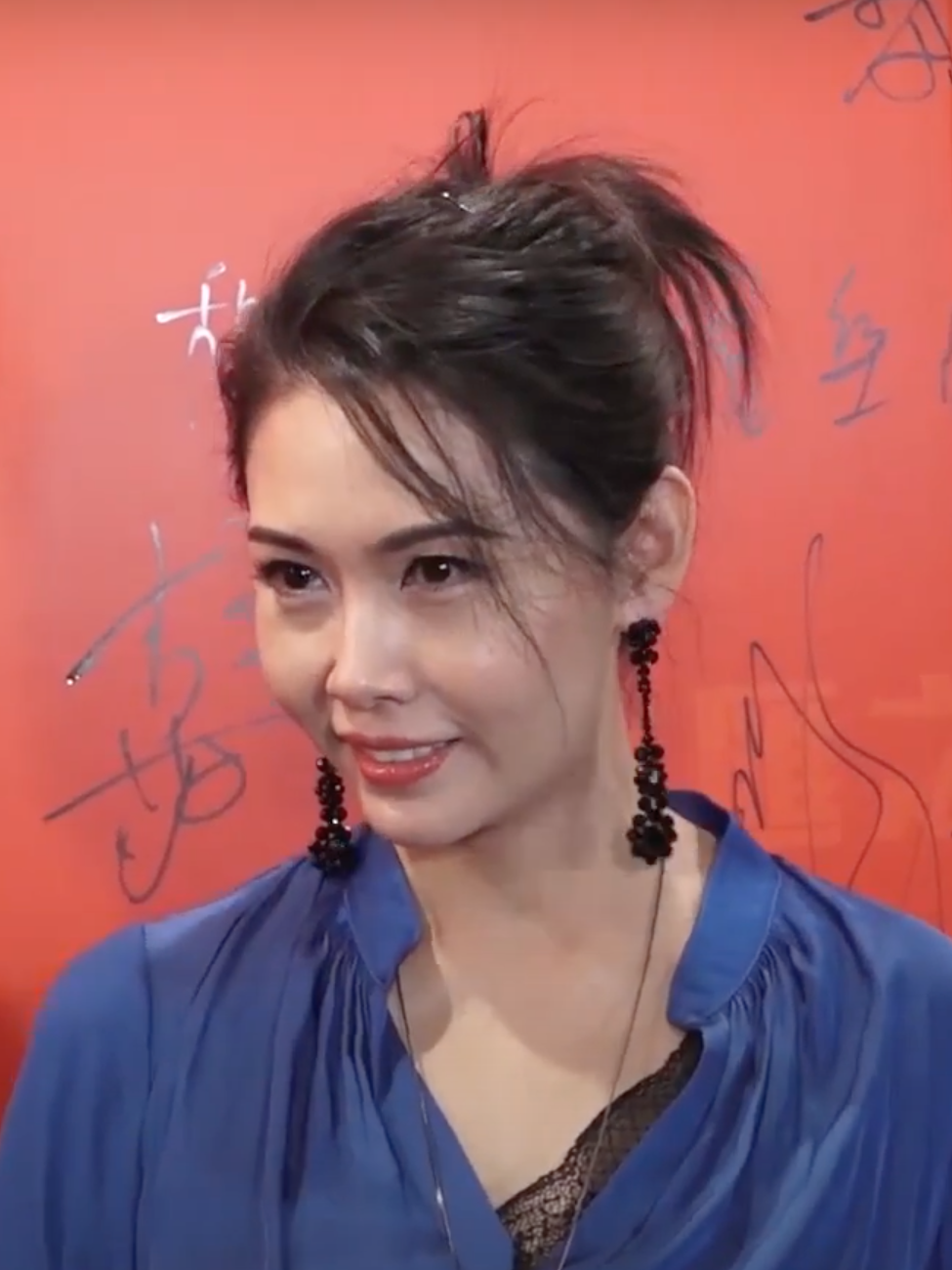
- Yau in 2018
- Born: 16 May 1968 (age 58); British Hong Kong
- Other names: Yau Shuk-ching, Chingamy Yau, Chingmy Yau Suk-ching, Yau Shu-tsing
- Occupation: Actress
- Years active: 1986–1999
- Spouse: Sham Kar Wai (m. 1999)

Chingmy Yau Suk-zing (born 16 May 1968) is a former Hong Kong actress. A sex symbol during the golden age of Hong Kong cinema in the 1990s, Yau is known for films such as Royal Tramp (1992), Naked Killer (1992) and Hold You Tight (1998).

== Background ==
Yau grew up in Tung Tau Estate in Wong Tai Sin, Kowloon, Hong Kong. In 1980, she graduated from Chi Tak Public School (morning session) as part of the school’s 18th graduating class. She then attended The Salvation Army William Booth Secondary School, Pentecostal Holiness Church Wing Kwong College, where she served as the student union president, and Chan Shu Kui Memorial School, completing her secondary education in 1985.

In 1987, Yau participated in the Miss Hong Kong Pageant and was the first contestant announced to enter the top 12. She was considered a strong contender for the title, but allegations surfaced accusing her of having undergone chin surgery. Despite her explanation that the surgery was the result of a childhood bike accident, the controversy persisted, and under the pageant organizers’ advice, Yau withdrew from the competition.

Shortly after withdrawing, Yau signed with TVB and began her career in the entertainment industry, with her acting debut in the TV series Police Cadet ’88. In 1988, she made her film debut, starring alongside Andy Lau in The Crazy Companies, which marked the beginning of a prolific film career as one of the leading actresses of the late 1980s and early 1990s.

In 1992, she received a nomination for Best Supporting Actress at the Hong Kong Film Awards for Lee Rock. That same year, at the suggestion of director Wong Jing, Yau transitioned from her previous innocent image to a more bold and sensual persona, most notably in Naked Killer, the cult classic that established her as a sex symbol and earned her a nomination for Best Actress at the 1993 Hong Kong Film Awards. She later received the same nomination for her performances in I'm Your Birthday Cake (1995) and Hold You Tight (1998). Yau’s final performance before her marriage was in Leslie Cheung’s music special Left Right Love Affair.

== Personal life ==
In 1988, Wong Jing invited Yau to co-star with Carol Cheng in the film Mr. Possessed. Following this, Yau became Wong Jing’s muse and girlfriend. At Wong’s suggestion, Yau abandoned her innocent and lively girl-next-door image and transformed into a sex symbol. In 1997, Yau and Wong ended their relationship.

In 1999, Yau married Hong Kong businessman Sham Kar Wai, founder of Hong Kong–based fashion company I.T. They have three daughters, with the eldest Ayla Sham Yuet being a model.

== Partial filmography ==
- Hold You Tight (1998)
- Lawyer Lawyer (1997)
- Feel 100%...Once More (1996)
- 4 Faces of Eve (1996)
- Bodyguards of Last Governor (1996)
- Street Angels (1996)
- Satan Returns (1996)
- Young and Dangerous 2 (1996)
- Blind Romance (1996)
- I'm Your Birthday Cake (1995)
- Legendary Couple (1995)
- High Risk aka Meltdown (1995)
- The Saint of Gamblers (1995)
- Lover of the Last Empress (1995)
- 1941 Hong Kong on Fire (1995)
- God of Gamblers Returns (1994)
- Return to a Better Tomorrow (1994)
- Modern Romance (1994)
- Modern Love (1994)
- The New Legend of Shaolin (1994)
- Kung Fu Cult Master (1993)
- Raped by an Angel (1993)
- Psycho Killer (Yu ye tian mo) (1993)
- Millionaire Cop (1993)
- Legend of the Liquid Sword (1993)
- Ghost Lantern (1993)
- Future Cops (1993)
- Boys Are Easy (1993)
- City Hunter (1993)
- Royal Tramp II (1992)
- Royal Tramp (1992)
- Truant Heroes (1992)
- She Starts the Fire (1992)
- Naked Killer (1992)
- Deadly Dream Woman (1992)
- Casino Tycoon 2 (1992)
- Casino Tycoon (1992)
- Tricky Brains (1991)
- Money Maker (1991)
- Lee Rock II (1991)
- Lee Rock (1991)
- My Neighbors are Phantoms (1990)
- The Romancing Star III (1989)
- Perfect Match (1989)
- They Came to Rob Hong Kong (1989)
- Mr. Fortune (1989)
- Ghost Busting (1989)
- Happy Together (1989)
- The Crazy Companies II (1988)
- The Crazy Companies (1988)
- How To Pick Girls Up (1988)
- The Inspector Wears Skirts (1988)

– Sources:,

== Awards and nominations ==
Year	Award	Category	Nominated work	Result
1992	Hong Kong Film Awards	Best Actress	Naked Killer	Nominated
1992	Hong Kong Film Awards	Best Supporting Actress	Lee Rock	Nominated
1996	Hong Kong Film Awards	Best Actress	I'm Your Birthday Cake	Nominated
1999	Hong Kong Film Awards	Best Actress	Hold You Tight	Nominated
1999	Golden Bauhinia Awards	Best Actress	Hold You Tight	Nominated
