= Diana Pang =

Diana Pang may refer to:

- Diana Pang (Chinese politician), born 1972, Hong Kong dancer and Chinese politician
- Diana Pang (Singaporean politician), Singaporean business executive and politician
