= Satan Returns =

1996 Hong Kong film by Lam Wai-lun

- Film poster
- 666魔鬼復活
- Directed by: Lam Wai-lun
- Screenplay by: Wong Jing
- Produced by: Poon Cheung-chuen
- Starring: Donnie Yen; Chingmy Yau; Kingdom Yuen; Francis Ng; Dayo Wong
- Cinematography: Cheng Siu-Keung
- Edited by: Angie Lam
- Music by: Tommy Wai
- Production companies: Wong Jing's Workshop; Upland Films
- Distributed by: Newport Entertainment
- Release date: 17 May 1996
- Running time: 97 minutes
- Country: Hong Kong
- Language: Cantonese
- Box office: HK$6,704,385

Satan Returns (666魔鬼復活), also known as Shaolin vs. The Devil's Omen in the United States, is a 1996 Hong Kong action horror film directed by Lam Wai-lun, starring Donnie Yen, Chingmy Yau, Kingdom Yuen, Francis Ng, and Dayo Wong.

== Synopsis ==
Ching, a Hong Kong police officer, has been experiencing the same nightmare about a woman being tied to an inverted cross and having her heart dug out. During a hostage situation, she kills the armed suspect despite having never fired a gun before, and sees later that the suspect was standing next to a dead woman hanging on an inverted cross.

As she is knowledgeable about religious symbols, Ching is invited to join her colleagues Nam and Ka-ming in investigating the case, which is seemingly connected to a recent series of murders. All the evidence from the crime scenes – ranging from verses in the Book of Revelation written in blood to the inverted cross – suggests that a Satanic cult is involved.

Judas, Satan's messenger, is responsible for the murders and he is searching everywhere in Hong Kong for his master's daughter, who was born on 6 June 1969. The police send three undercover policewomen to lure Judas out, but they fail to arrest him. Ching has visions of her long-lost father, who had abandoned her in her childhood, and hears from Judas that she is Satan's daughter. Nam and Ka-ming are assigned to protect Ching from Judas, but they are no match for him as he has supernatural powers.

In the early hours of 6 June 1996, Judas kidnaps Ching and takes her to the rooftop of a tall building, where he intends to carry out a ritual to take out her heart. If she survives, then she is Satan's daughter. Nam and Ka-ming come to save Ching and fight Judas. Nam kills Judas after using a nail gun to impale him on a cross and set him on fire; the burning cross falls off the rooftop and lands on a van. Just as it reaches 6 a.m., Ching tests whether she is really Satan's daughter by digging out her heart. She survives and shows her heart to Ka-ming, who screams. While the van burns in the background, Revelation 20:7:8 appears on the screen before the credits roll.

== Cast ==
- Donnie Yen as Nam
- Chingmy Yau as Ching
- Kingdom Yuen as Rose
- Francis Ng as Judas
- Dayo Wong as Ka-ming
- Spencer Lam as the priest
- Ivy Leung as Leon
- Cheung Lau as Lulu
- Lam Kwok-kit as Lulu's colleague
- Lee Lik-chi as Peter
- Wayne Lai (cameo)

== Critical reception ==
Love HK Film gave the film a negative review and writes "Satan Returns is plagued by the wacky, nonsensical Hong Kong ways which just don't work in pictures like these."

=== Box office ===
The film grossed HK$6,704,385 at the Hong Kong box office during its theatrical run from 17 May to 7 June 1996 in Hong Kong.

== See also ==
- Donnie Yen filmography
- Wong Jing filmography
