= The Spy Dad =

2003 Hong Kong film by Wong Jing

- Film poster

Chinese name
- Traditional Chinese: 絕種鐵金剛
- Simplified Chinese: 绝种铁金刚
Transcriptions
Standard Mandarin
- Hanyu Pinyin: Jué Zhǒng Tiě Jīn Gāng
Yue: Cantonese
- Jyutping: Zyut6 Zung2 Tit3 Gam1 Gong1
- Directed by: Wong Jing
- Screenplay by: Wong Jing
- Produced by: Wong Jing; Cao Biao
- Starring: Tony Leung; Candice Yu; Jordan Chan; Gillian Chung; Chapman To; Teresa Mo; Eric Kot; Elvis Tsui; Meme Tian; Wai Wah; Edison Chen; Jim Chim
- Cinematography: Edmond Fung
- Edited by: Azrael Chung
- Music by: Marco Wan
- Production companies: China Star Entertainment; Wisdom Entertainment; Jing's Production
- Distributed by: China Star Entertainment; China Film Group
- Release date: 23 October 2003
- Running time: 112 minutes
- Country: Hong Kong
- Language: Cantonese
- Box office: HK$5.4 million

The Spy Dad is a 2003 Hong Kong comedy film produced, written and directed by Wong Jing and starring Tony Leung as the titular protagonist, Jones Bon, an action film star with obvious homage to James Bond 007 films, with additional references to martial arts films by Bruce Lee.

== Plot ==
Jones Bon is a famous action film star who specialized in playing the role of a superhero like James Bond. But he was as timid as a mouse in real life. His cowardice caused his wife, Isabel, to divorce him leaving him as a single parent to take care of his two lovely daughters, Cream and Crispy. Isabel returned to Hong Kong to shoot a blockbuster with Jones. Interpol agent Titman followed the mad scientist Dr. Donno to Lungyi's hideout where the latter manufactured an Intelligence Degeneration Virus. When Titman seized the container of the Intelligence Degeneration Virus and attempted to arrest them, a gunfight broke out. The container was hit by a bullet and the Intelligence Degeneration Virus leaked out. Titman was infected by the virus, but he still escaped with the Ultra-SARS Virus.

== Cast ==
- Tony Leung Ka-fai as Jones Bon
- Candice Yu as Isabel Kwan
- Jordan Chan as Titman
- Gillian Chung as Cream
- Chapman To as Love Kwan
- Teresa Mo as Barbara
- Eric Kot as Dr. Donno
- Elvis Tsui as Lungyi
- Meme Tian as Janet
- Wai Wah as Banana
- Edison Chen as Ronald
- Jim Chim as Mr. and Mrs. Tung
- Michael Chan as Great
- Tommy Yuen as Juno
- Rosemary Vandenbroucke as Rosemary
- Pak Suet as Hailey
- Tats Lau as IQ
- Perrie Lai as Mrs. Yip
- Hawick Lau as bellboy
- Joe Cheng as Golden Toe
- Marco Mak as Olio man
- Gary Mak as Mr. Lee
- Sunny Luk as Leung Fun
- Bobby Yip as appears in "Matrix" computer
- Winnie Chan as Ice Cream
- Bill Lo as Titman's superior officer
- Mak Siu-wah as Great's bodyguard
- Leon Head as Mr. Baron
- Ho Wai-yip

== Box office ==
The film grossed HK$5,429,623 at the Hong Kong box office during its theatrical run from 23 October to 19 November 2003 in Hong Kong.

== See also ==
- Wong Jing filmography
