= Perfect Exchange =

1993 Hong Kong film by Wong Jing

- DVD cover

Chinese name
- Traditional Chinese: 至尊三十六計之偷天換日
- Simplified Chinese: 至尊三十六计之偷天换日
Transcriptions
Standard Mandarin
- Hanyu Pinyin: Zhì Zūn Sān Shí Liù Jì Zhī Tōu Tiān Huàn Rì
Yue: Cantonese
- Jyutping: Zi3 Zyun1 Saam1 Sap6 Leok6 Gai3 Zi1 Tau1 Tin1 Wun6 Jat6
- Directed by: Wong Jing
- Screenplay by: Wong Jing
- Produced by: Jimmy Heung
- Starring: Andy Lau; Tony Leung
- Cinematography: Andrew Lau; Tony Miu
- Edited by: Poon Hung
- Music by: Philip Chan; Sherman Chow
- Production company: Win's Entertainment
- Distributed by: Gala Film Distribution
- Release date: 30 September 1993
- Running time: 105 minutes
- Country: Hong Kong
- Language: Cantonese
- Box office: HK$17,912,327

Perfect Exchange, also known as The Sting II, is a 1993 Hong Kong action comedy film written and directed by Wong Jing and starring Andy Lau and Tony Leung. The film was rated Category III by the Hong Kong motion picture rating system.

== Plot ==
Mandy Chin plays poker with prison inspector Chung Cho-hung, rich tycoon Lau Yiu-cho and Singaporean gambler Chan Wah-lek in Lau's casino and cheats with the help of his girlfriend, Lily, and partner in crime, Gold Finger Chi as the card dealers, and wins over HK$6 million. Afterwards, Mandy and Chi are attacked by Lau's henchmen and engage in a car chase, where Mandy evades them by crashing their cars, leading to a big explosion. Mandy and Chi arrive at a disco bar where Chung is attempting to seduce Lily. After humiliating Chung, Mandy and Chi fight off some of Chung's subordinates and evade the rest in a foot chase before cornering Chung in an elevator and beating him up.

Mandy and Chi return home and find Lau and his mistress, Mona, holding Lily hostage while his top henchman, Pau, breaks Chi's leg. Lau, enraged that Mandy conned HK$4 million from him, blackmails Mandy to enter prison and interrogate his former subordinate, Robinson Shun, who stole HK$300 million in treasury bonds from him, and promises to pay Mandy HK$10 million as a reward if he manages to have Robinson tell him the whereabouts of the bonds within a month. Lily reports Mandy for sexual harassment to get him arrested. However, due to lack of evidence, the judge does not accept the case, so Mandy resorts to throwing his shoe at the judge to get a one-month prison sentence for contempt of court and assaulting the judge.

Chung looks forward to torturing Mandy in prison, but the latter bribes inmates Kei, Big Eye Kwong and Crazy Bill for protection. Dinosaur, a henchman sent by Lau earlier to interrogate Robinson, attempts to assault the latter in the shower room but Mandy stops him. Dinosaur later breaks Robinson's leg. In the prison hospital, Robinson reveals to Mandy that Lau is actually his son-in-law who used to work for him and later cheated his assets and killed his daughter when she took the HK$300 million in treasury bonds from Lau. Robinson attacked Lau with a cleaver and was arrested and imprisoned. Mandy has a change of heart after hearing this and Dinosaur warns him if he does not complete his job within two days, Chi will be in danger. Robinson overhears this but he believes Mandy is a good person and asks him to take down Lau and promises to give him the treasury bonds if succeeds.

Knowing the bonds are hidden in Lau's villa, Mandy offers Chung HK$30 million to help him by wooing Mona. Mandy sneaks out of prison by hiding in the car of a Catholic social worker, Turkey Chu, and attempts to find the bonds at Lau's villa while Chung has sex with Mona in the bedroom of Lau's deceased wife. However, Mandy finds Chi's dead body while Lau catches Chung and has him arrested and imprisoned for home intrusion and indecent exposure. Chung and Mandy (who sneaks back into prison) are assigned to the same cell with Dinosaur, who fights them with his henchmen until Robinson, Kwong, Kei and Bill are moved to the same cell.

On the night of Lau and Mona's engagement party, a riot erupts after Robinson tackles Dinosaur in the cafeteria. After Mandy and Chung defeat Pau, who was also sent into prison by Lau, the two escape from prison with Robinson amidst the chaos. Once out, Robinson reveals to Chung that the treasury bonds are hidden in the pillow on the bed of the bedroom of Lau's wife (which Chung lay on earlier). Chung then knocks out Mandy and Robinson to get them for himself. Chung arrives at the party in Lau's villa but Lau discovers him and holds him at gunpoint. Mandy arrives in time with a gun and shoots Lau after knocking Chung. With the help of Lily, Mandy lures Lau into killing Mona and Lau is arrested. Robinson takes the hidden bonds from a lizard cage. Mandy, Chung and Robinson then sneak back into prison dressed as paramedics in an ambulance. Mandy is acquitted of his sexual harassment charge. He gives Chung the HK$30 million check he promised earlier, which will only be cashable in 1997, the bonds are deposited in a Swiss bank to generate interest, while Mandy will travel around the world with Lily for four years.

== Cast ==
- Andy Lau as Mandy Chin (錢文迪), an expert gambler and swindler.
- Tony Leung Ka-fai as Chung Cho-hung (鍾楚雄), a prison inspector who is nicknamed Killer Hung (殺手雄) for wooing countless women.
- Christy Chung as Lily (莉莉), Mandy's girlfriend.
- Kwan Hoi-san as Robinson (魯賓孫), a prison inmate framed by Lau, who also accumulated his assets.
- Kingdom Yuen as Turkey Chu (朱火雞), a Catholic social worker who is attracted to Mandy and helped him sneak in and out of prison several times.
- Anita Lee as Mona (夢娜), Lau's mistress who cheats on him with numerous men.
- Natalis Chan as Chan Wah-lek (陳華叻), a nine-time poker champion from Singapore who loses to Mandy in a poker game.
- Liu Kai-chi as Chi (阿智), nicknamed Gold Finger (金手指), Mandy's assistant and partner in crime.
- Tommy Wong as Big Eye Kwong (大眼光), a prison inmate bribed by Mandy.
- Wang Lung-wei as Pau (阿豹), Lau's top henchman.
- Chan Chi-fai as Dinosaur (恐龍), Lau's henchman who was sent to interrogate Robinson in prison but was unsuccessful.
- Lee Siu-kei as Brother Kei (基哥), a prison inmate bribed by Mandy.
- Victor Hon as Brother Hung, a prison inmate.
- William Ho as Crazy Bill (傻標), a prison inmate bribed by Mandy.
- Wan Chi Keung as Lau Yiu-cho (劉耀祖), Robinson's son in-law who blackmails Mandy in order to seize a HK$300 million treasury bond.
- Teddy Yip as Chung Cho-hung's adoptive father and a former sailor who was at sea when his wife cheated on him and have birth to Chung.
- Lok Wai as the girlfriend of Chung's father from Beijing who leaves him after causing him to suffer a heart attack while engaging in BDSM.
- Pau Hon-lam as a judge who sentenced both Mandy and Chung to prison and a victim of the two's shoe throwing at their respective hearings.
- Law Shu-kei as the prison warden.
- Fung Wai-lung as Lau's henchman.
- Sam Ho as Dog (食屎狗), Chung's subordinate.
- Bobby Au-yeung
- Carol Lee
- Leung Siu-tik as a prison inmate
- Kwan Yung as Inmate
- Kong Miu-ting as a prison inmate and a prison guard in dual roles.
- Ng Kwok-kin as a prison guard.
- Chan Siu-wah as Chung's subordinate at disco
- Fei Pak as a prison guard
- Wong Wai-shun as Lau's henchman.

== Reception ==
=== Critical ===
Perfect Exchange received relatively positive scores of 6.1/10 stars from the Internet Movie Database and 6.8/10 stars from Douban. Kenneth Brorsson of So Good Reviews gave the film a positive review and writes "It helps that a performer like Tony Leung is very game and while Andy Lau is the cool presence in addition to a character rarely being in danger, he's the lesser part of the double act. It just doesn't seem like a fit to have Lau this time around in such a jarring Wong Jing film that mixes the crazy, the silly, Lau going into prison on a rape charge and various, jarring pieces of violence scattered throughout. But it's bearable and actually funny in parts so therefore great success coming from Wong Jing."

=== Box office ===
The film grossed HK$17,912,327 at the Hong Kong box office during its theatrical run from 30 September to 20 October 1993 in Hong Kong.

== See also ==
- Andy Lau filmography
- Wong Jing filmography
- List of Hong Kong Category III films
