= The Crazy Companies =

1988 Hong Kong film by Wong Jing

- Film poster

Chinese name
- Traditional Chinese: 最佳損友
- Simplified Chinese: 最佳损友
Transcriptions
Standard Mandarin
- Hanyu Pinyin: Zuì Jiā Sǔn You
Yue: Cantonese
- Jyutping: Zeoi3 Gaai1 Syun2 Jau2
- Directed by: Wong Jing
- Screenplay by: Wong Jing
- Produced by: Wallace Cheung
- Starring: Andy Lau; Natalis Chan; Stanley Fung; Idy Chan; Chingmy Yau; Sandra Ng; Joan Tong
- Cinematography: Joe Chan
- Edited by: Robert Choi
- Music by: Sherman Chow
- Production companies: Win's Entertainment; Wa Nga Films; Era Film and TV Production; Movie Impact
- Distributed by: Golden Harvest
- Release date: 27 March 1988
- Running time: 99 minutes
- Country: Hong Kong
- Language: Cantonese
- Box office: HK$21,822,756

The Crazy Companies (Chinese: 最佳損友) is a 1988 Hong Kong comedy film directed by Wong Jing, and starring Andy Lau and Natalis Chan. It was followed by a sequel, The Crazy Companies II, which was released in 1989.

== Summary ==
When Tsui Tung Kwai (Andy Lau), a young Hong-Kong man trying to make it in America as a film extra learns that his father has died and left half of his fortune to him and he travels back to Hong-Kong. Upon arrival he learns that the money comes with the proviso that he must work his way up in the company for 6 months without getting into trouble; unbeknownst to him, his stepbrother has hired the 3 worst managers in the company to try to bring him down.

== Cast ==
- Andy Lau - Tsui Tung Kwai
- Natalis Chan - Tam Sad-Chiu
- Stanley Fung - Frank
- Idy Chan - Joanne
- Chingmy Yau - Kimmy
- Sandra Ng - Doriana
- Joan Tong Lai-Kau - Happy
- Charlie Cho - Kim
- Hui Ying-Sau - Uncle
- Law Ching-Ho - Supervisor of Office Boys
- Law Ho-Kai - Joanne's friend
- Shing Fui-On - Big Brother
- James Wong - Priest
- Wong Jing - Cameo
- Yung Sai-Kit - Tsui Ting-Fu

== See also ==
- Andy Lau filmography
- Wong Jing filmography
