= Dances with Dragon =

1991 Hong Kong film by Wong Jing

- DVD cover

Chinese name
- Traditional Chinese: 與龍共舞
- Simplified Chinese: 与龙共舞
Transcriptions
Standard Mandarin
- Hanyu Pinyin: Yǔ Lóng Gòng Wǔ
Yue: Cantonese
- Jyutping: Jyu2 Lung4 Gung6 Mou2
- Directed by: Wong Jing
- Screenplay by: Wong Jing
- Produced by: Jimmy Heung
- Starring: Andy Lau; Sharla Cheung; Deanie Ip; Ng Man-tat
- Cinematography: Joe Chan
- Edited by: Robert Choi
- Music by: Lowell Lo; Sherman Chow
- Production company: Win's Entertainment
- Distributed by: Golden Harvest
- Release date: 19 December 1991
- Running time: 108 minutes
- Country: Hong Kong
- Language: Cantonese
- Box office: HK$20,498,920

Dances with Dragon is a 1991 Hong Kong romantic comedy film directed by Wong Jing and starring Andy Lau as a rich businessman who ends up being mistaken as an illegal immigrant from China on Lantau Island, where falls in love with an employee (Sharla Cheung) of his company who is unaware of his real identity.

== Plot ==
Lung Ka-chun (Andy Lau), chairman of Lung's Enterprise, nearly runs over Moon (Sharla Cheung), a interviewee for a position in his company from Lantau Island while on his way to work. Despite her throwing a tantrum at him, he is attracted to her and she scores the position. At the same time, Lung is by his mother (Lee Heung-kam) to marry his younger cousin, Diana (Yvonne Yung) and sets them up on a date on a yacht. However, Diana is irritated by Lung's disinterest in her and pushes him in the water and gets mixed with a group of illegal immigrant swimming from mainland China and end up on Lantau Island by police officers. Lung gets caught by an officer and was unable to prove himself as a Hong Kong citizen as he left his ID on his yacht but another illegal immigrant knocks the officer out and Lung flees and hides on the roof of Moon's home. The roof collapses and Lung's falls into the bathroom where Moon was showering so she and her mother, Aunt Eleven (Deanie Ip), beat him. Thinking Lung is an illegal immigrant, Eleven takes him in to work as a cheap labor in her store and he agrees to stay to purposely want his mother to worry for forcing him to marry his cousin. Lung informs his assistant, Uncle Fly (Ng Man-tat), about this and Fly arrives to give him a cellphone and a shoe telling him to look for police sergeant Uncle Prawn (Wu Ma), if he gets into a dangerous situation.

Moon and her best friend, Charmy (May Lo) reunite with her old classmates and one of them, Mary, invites them to her birthday party next week. Moon lies to Mary that she has a boyfriend so Charmy suggests Moon to bring Lung to the party to pose as her boyfriend and give him an oversized suit. At the party, Moon's ex-boyfriend, Mr. Sze (Pal Sinn), humiliates her and Lung. Fly secretly arrives and gives Lung a new suit while helping him humiliate Sze buy helping him buy a lottery ticket to show off his wealth as well as driving a helicopter to pick Lung and Moon up. Lung lies to Moon that Fly is a fellow soldier turned gang member from China. Moon later watches the sunset with Lung and tells him on her birthday, she wants to turn her home into a palace and have a prince dance with her.

Meanwhile, Aunt Eleven instructs Lung to help her cheat in a mahjong game with triad members which did not go well and they discovered it and threaten Eleven so Moon asks Lung to call for his "fellow gang comrades" for help. Lung calls Fly, who is arrested for carrying realistic-looking you guns with his subordinates posing as gangsters, so Fly tells Lung to find Uncle Prawn with the shoe. When Lung goes to the police station, he discovers Prawn is to officer that caught him earlier and was knocked out. Making matters worst, Lung's shoe is bitten up by pigs while he also accidentally kills Prawn's prized pet cricket. Lung then calls Fly, who tells him to sing Prawn's favorite Cantonese opera song and finally gains his trust, so Prawn leads his subordinates posing as a group of criminals to threaten and torture the triads. Through the torture, the triads reveal that Lung paid them to force Eleven to sell her store and land to develop a resort.

Eleven, Moon and Lung go to the office Lung Enterprise to find Lung, who tries hard to not reveal himself as Eleven and Moon are still unaware of his real identity. Lung then discovers, his older cousin, Martin (Alfred Cheung), was scheming with his rival, Chow Tai-pang to develop land and framed Lung for ordering the triads to cause trouble at Eleven's store. At meantime, Eleven and Moon were thrown out by security guards. When they return home, Moon waits for Lung to return and Eleven deduces her daughter has fallen in love with him. Fly then arrives to tell Moon Lung will return after making big bucks and will remember her birthday.

Lung returns home telling hus mother he came back from vacation and she agrees to not force him to marry. On Moon's birthday, Lung gives her a batch a roses and tells her he will go to the Prestigious Charity Auction to tackle Lung Ka-chun so Moon and Eleven goes as well. At the auction, Moon and Eleven discover Lung's true identity while Eleven also reunites with her first love, Chu Chi-keung (Paul Chu), who is the new assistant manager of Lung's Enterprise. Lung defeats Chow in bidding two pieces of land from Lantau Island with HK$610 million and persuades Eleven to sell her store while offering her a new supermarket when the resort is finished at Lantau Island while also transfers Martin to New Guinea as punishment. Right before the ball starts, Lung announces he wants to dance with an important woman, who is his mother, and Moon leaves in dismay. When she returns home, Fly surprises her with a cake and tells her it was from Lung and she walks outside and realizes Lung fulfilled her wish of turning her home into palace. Lung walks to her and gives her a batch flowers as well as a new pair of glasses of a discontinued brand which Diana broke earlier, and dances with her.

== Cast ==
- Andy Lau as Lung Ka-chun (龍家俊), chairman of Lung's Enterprise (龍門企業) who is stressed out by his life and mother forcing him to marry his younger cousin, Diana. When Diana pushes him into the sea, he ends up on Lantau Island without his ID and mistaken as an illegal immigrant from China and nicknames himself Chicken (大陸雞) and works for Aunt Eleven and falls in love with her daughter, Moon, an employee at his company.
- Sharla Cheung as Moon Chan (陳月光), a girl from Lantau Island who recently got a position at Lung's Enterprise. She falls in love with Lung, who she is unaware is her boss, when he ends up at her home and spending time with her.
- Deanie Ip as Aunt Eleven (十一家), Moon's aggressive mother who takes Lung in to work as cheap labor in her store as well as using him to swindle money from others.
- Ng Man-tat as Uncle Fly (蒼蠅叔), Lung's trusted assistant.
- Alfred Cheung as Martin Kung (鞏利), Lung's older cousin who is head of the Personal Department of Lung's Enterprise who is horny and has his eyes of Moon. He betrays Lung during his absence and schemes with Lung's rival, Chow Tai-pang.
- May Lo as Charmy (靚靚), Moon's best friend who helps her get an interview at Lung's Enterprise.
- Yvonne Yung as Diana Kung (鞏黛娜), Lung's sassy and entitled cousin who pushes him into the sea when she is angry of his disinterest in her.
- Wu Ma as Uncle Prawn (鹹蝦叔), a police sergeant in Lantau Island who is Fly's good friend who used to work for Lui Lok.
- Lee Heung-kam as Mrs. Lung (龍太), Lung's mother who forces him to marry Diana.
- Paul Chu as Chu Chi-keung (朱志強), the new assistant manager of Lung's Enterprise hired by Lung from the US headquarters of Lung's. He is also Eleven's first love who was nicknamed Tomato (番茄) when they were dating.
- Pal Sinn as Mr. Sze (史公子), Moon's ex-boyfriend and Mary's boyfriend who the son of a rich man and humiliates Moon and Lung at Mary's birthday party, but Lung retaliates by humiliating him in front of everyone.
- Chan Hiu-ying as Mary, Moon and Charmy's old classmate.
- Pau Hon-lam as Chau Tai-pang (周大鵬), Lung's arrogant business rival who schemes with Martin but is eventually defeated by Lung.
- John Ching as Ng Oi-kong (吳愛港), an illegal immigrant who swam from China and knocks Uncle Prawn out to help Lung flee.
- Wong Yat-fei as Chung (阿蟲), Aunt Eleven's former employee whom she fires after a money dispute before using Lung as his replacement
- Wong Hung as Aunt Eleven's mahjong friend.
- Bill Lung as Brother Fat (發哥), a triad boss who threatens Eleven after catching her cheating on a mahjong game and was hired by Chow to intimidate her to sell her store while framing Lung.
- Ha Kwok-wing as Fat's gangster.
- Ridley Tsui as Fat's gangster.
- Lau Sing-kwong as Fat's gangster.
- Wan Seung-lam as Fat's gangster.
- Tam Wai-man as Fat's gangster.
- Chan Yuet-yue as Judy Ma, a boutique manager.
- Lawrence Lau as man outside Judy Ma's boutique who gets a kiss from Moon when he gives her HK$50.
- Ho Chi-moon as auctioneer at the Prestigious Charity Auction.
- Fung Kam Hung as chauffeur hired by Charmy to drive to Mary's party.
- Steve Brettingham as Lung's fitness coach who Lung outruns.
- Fung Man-kwong as Uncle Slimmy (奀叔), a breakfast patron at Eleven's store.
- Ng Kwok-kin as a policeman.
- Lee Wah-kon as Uncle Fatty (肥伯), a breakfast patron at Eleven's store.

== Songs ==
=== Theme song ===
- Song: Dance with the Dragon (與龍共舞)
  - Composer: Lowell Lo
  - Lyricist: Siu Mei
  - Singer: Cally Kwong

=== Sub theme song ===
- Song: Kiss Me Again (再吻我吧) (Cantonese) / Forget this Life (把今生忘掉) (Mandarin)
  - Composer: Wong Hing Yuen
  - Lyricist: Andy Lau (Cantonese), Tse Ming-fan (Mandarin)
  - Singer: Andy Lau
- Song: Long Nights Are Romantic (長夜多浪漫)
  - Composer: Kyohei Tsutsumi, Masai Urino
  - Lyricist: Thomas Chow
  - Singer: Andy Lau

== Awards and nominations ==
- 11th Hong Kong Film Awards
  - Winner: Best Supporting Actress (Deanie Ip)
  - Nominated: Best Actress (Sharla Cheung)
  - Nominated: Best Original Film Song (Dance with the Dragon (與龍共舞) - Composer: Lowell Lo, Lyricist: Siu Mei, Singer: Cally Kwong

== See also ==
- Andy Lau filmography
- Wong Jing filmography
