= The Romancing Star II =

1988 Hong Kong film by Wong Jing

- DVD cover

Chinese name
- Traditional Chinese: 精裝追女仔之2
- Simplified Chinese: 精装追女仔之2
Transcriptions
Standard Mandarin
- Hanyu Pinyin: Jīng Zhuāng Zhuī Nǚ Zǎi Zhī Èr
Yue: Cantonese
- Jyutping: Zing1 Zong1 Zeoi1 Neoi5 Zai2 Zi1 Ji6
- Directed by: Wong Jing
- Screenplay by: Wong Jing
- Produced by: Wallace Cheung
- Starring: Andy Lau; Eric Tsang; Natalis Chan; Stanley Fung; Lo Hoi-pang; Wong Jing; Carina Lau; Elizabeth Lee; Ngan Ning; Wong Wan-sze; Chow Yun-fat
- Cinematography: David Choi
- Edited by: Robert Choi
- Music by: Sherman Chow
- Production companies: Win's Movie Production; Movie Impact
- Distributed by: Win's Entertainment; Gala Film Distribution Limited
- Release date: 21 January 1988
- Running time: 102 minutes
- Country: Hong Kong
- Language: Cantonese
- Box office: HK$17,096,271

The Romancing Star II (Chinese: 精裝追女仔之2) is a 1988 Hong Kong romantic comedy film written and directed by Wong Jing and starring Andy Lau, Eric Tsang, Natalis Chan and Stanley Fung. Chow Yun-fat, the star of the film's precedent The Romancing Star, makes a brief cameo in the opening scene. The film was later followed by The Romancing Star III released in the following year.

== Plot ==
Lau Pei collaborates with his friends to film a drama series to impress his crush Po-chu, but the drama series leads to unexpected levels of popularity.

== Cast ==
- Andy Lau as Lau Pei
- Eric Tsang as Silver / Mocking Face
- Natalis Chan as Tony / Traffic Light
- Stanley Fung as Ken Lau
- Lo Hoi-pang as Mr. Chow
- Wong Jing as Simon Hand
- Carina Lau as Fong Fong
- Elizabeth Lee as Ching Po-chu
- Ngan Ning as Ka-yin
- Wong Wan-sze as Sister 13
- Chow Yun-fat as Fred Wong / Big Mouth Fat (cameo)
- Alan Tam as himself in lift (cameo)
- Michael Lai as Mr. Lai
- Cheng Gwan-min
- Ben Wong
- Charlie Cho as Mr. Tsang
- Yu Mo-lin as Lady in phone booth (red dress)
- Manfred Wong as Furniture mover's boss
- Lam Fai-wong as man in toilet (cameo)
- Lily Ng as Simon's lover
- Mak Wai-cheung as CID at bank
- William Ho as Mickey in Prison on Fire parody (cameo)
- Victor Hon as Prisoner in Prison on Fire parody (cameo)
- Thomas Sin as Prisoner in Prison on Fire parody (cameo)
- Tony Tam as Gangster boss at hawker stall
- Chun Kwai-po as Gangster at hawker stall
- Chang Sing-kwong as Gangster at hawker stall
- Leung Hak-shun as Councillor Sze To Ming
- Cheung Kwok-wah as Guest at Brother Lung's funeral (cameo)
- Mak Hiu-wai as Guest at Brother Lung's funeral
- Yip Seung-wah as Compere
- Mau Kin-tak as Channel 8 TV's staff
- Shirley Kwan as Woman at Brother Lung's funeral
- Sherman Wong as Chow TV's production staff
- Lee Chuen-hau as Chow TV's interviewee
- Fan Chin-hung as gangster at hawker stall

== Theme songs ==
- Flaming Red Lips (烈焰紅唇)
  - Composer: Anthony Lun
  - Lyricist: Calvin Poon
  - Singer: Anita Mui
- Sunshine Big Clearance Sale (陽光大減價)
  - Composer: Michael Leeson, Peter Vale
  - Lyricist: Lo Wing-keung
  - Singer: Bennett Pang

== Box office ==
The film grossed HK$17,096,271 at the Hong Kong box office during its theatrical run from 21 January to 10 February 1988 in Hong Kong.

== See also ==
- Andy Lau filmography
- Chow Yun-fat filmography
- Wong Jing filmography
