= Millionaire Cop =

1992 Hong Kong film by Nelson Cheung

- Film poster
- Traditional Chinese: 千面天王
- Simplified Chinese: 千面天王
- Hanyu Pinyin: Qiān Miàn Tiān Wáng
- Jyutping: Cin1 Min6 Tin1 Wong4
- Directed by: Nelson Cheung
- Screenplay by: Dennis Chan
- Produced by: Wong Jing; Chan Tai-lei
- Starring: Aaron Kwok; Maggie Cheung; Chingmy Yau; Ng Man-tat; Deric Wan; Kingdom Yuen; Hung Yan-yan; Elaine Eca Da Silva; Chor Yuen
- Cinematography: Joe Chan
- Edited by: Johnson Chow
- Music by: Philip Chan
- Production company: Wong Jing's Workshop
- Distributed by: Newport Entertainment
- Release dates: 23 November 1992 (VHS); 1 January 1993 (Hong Kong)
- Running time: 91 minutes
- Country: Hong Kong
- Language: Cantonese
- Box office: HK$5,586,339

Millionaire Cop is a 1993 Hong Kong action comedy film directed by Nelson Cheung and starring Aaron Kwok, Maggie Cheung, Chingmy Yau and Ng Man-tat.

== Plot ==
The young and talented cop Ball (Aaron Kwok) is partners with the cowardly Fish (Ng Man-tat). One day, the police force received news that a gang of kidnappers has threatened kidnap Jessy Lee (Deric Wan), the son of Hong Kong billionaire Lee Ka-sing (Dennis Chan). The police then sends Ball undercover and takes Jessy Lee's identity and sought for more information in the Lee Enterprises. However, Ball's girlfriend Shun (Chingmy Yau), unexpectedly joins the Lee Enterprises and clashes with Jacky (Maggie Cheung), Jessy's ex-lover who mistakenly believes Ball to be Jessy. Meanwhile, a criminal named Robber (Hung Yan-yan) vows to seek vengeance on Ball after their chief of the gang earlier in a robbery when Ball was chasing him.

== Cast ==
- Aaron Kwok as Ball
- Maggie Cheung as Jacky Cheuk
- Chingmy Yau as Shun
- Ng Man-tat as Fish
- Deric Wan as Jessy lee
- Kingdom Yuen as Mrs. She
- Hung Yan-yan as Robber
- Elaine Eca Da Silva as Robber's partner and lover
- Chor Yuen as Sergeant Lai
- Lee Siu-kei as kidnapper chief
- Dennis Chan as Billionaire Lee Ka-sing
- Mak Hiu-wai as Sing's executive
- Cheng Ka-sang as Robbers' chief
- Kwok Tak-sun
- Fong Kit
- Lee Yiu-king
- Cheung Tak-wing
- Siao Yan-yan as Sing's executive
- Chan Wing-chun
- Ho Wing-cheung as Kidnapper
- Ng Kwok-kin as policeman
- Lee Ka-hung as Rappist
- Ho Chi-moon
- Sung Boon-chung
- Yu Ming-hin

== Theme song ==
- Why Would I Let You Leave (我為何讓你走)
  - Composer: Anthony Lun
  - Lyricist: Calvin Poon
  - Singer: Aaron Kwok
- You and Me
  - Composer: Keisuke Kuwata
  - Lyricist: Poon Wai-yuen
  - Singer: Aaron Kwok

== Reception ==
=== Critical ===
LoveHKFilm gave the film a negative review and referred to it as "Wong Jing garbage" and "Big stars, bad movie". It also said the only saving graces are "decent fights and the presence of Chingmy Yau, who’s actually quite appealing in this movie."

=== Box office ===
The film grossed HK$5,586,339 at the Hong Kong box office during its theatrical run from 1 to 13 January 1993 in Hong Kong.

== See also ==
- Aaron Kwok filmography
