= Legendary Couple =

1995 Hong Kong film by Peter Ngor

- Film poster
- Traditional Chinese: 我是一個賊
- Simplified Chinese: 我是一个贼
- Hanyu Pinyin: Wǒ Shì Yī Gè Zéi
- Jyutping: Ngo2 Si6 Jat1 Go3 Caak2
- Directed by: Peter Ngor
- Screenplay by: Chau Ting; Nam Yin
- Produced by: Nam Yin; Raymond Wong
- Starring: Simon Yam; Chingmy Yau
- Cinematography: Kwong Ting-wo; Johnny Koo
- Edited by: Chan Kei-hop
- Music by: Mak Chun Hung
- Production companies: Mandarin Films; Nam Yin Production
- Distributed by: Mandarin Films
- Release date: 14 September 1995
- Running time: 94 minutes
- Country: Hong Kong
- Language: Cantonese
- Box office: HK$4,554,985

Legendary Couple, also known as Story of a Robber (Chinese: 我是一個賊; lit. 'I Am a Robber'), is a 1995 Hong Kong action film directed by Peter Ngor and starring Simon Yam and Chingmy Yau.

== Plot ==
Ko Tin-lap (Simon Yam) is an honest and dutiful accountant. One day, his superior, Lui Chan-sam (Wan Yeung-ming) gives him the duty to escort HK$5 million to the bank. Ko encounters robbers on his way and the entire sum of money is stolen. Lui and the police believe the theft was planned by Ko in order to take the money for himself. Because of this, Ko not only loses his job, but his entire savings which are claimed by Lui.

Angry at his boss, Ko kidnaps Lui's daughter, Chi-lan (Chingmy Yau), and demands a ransom of HK$10 million. On the way to the ransom exchange, an accident happens and by chance, Ko saves Chi-lan. Afterwards, Chi-lan learns about the truth of Ko's misfortune and sympathizes with him. Later, a series of events leads Chi-lan to discover her father's greed and cold-bloodedness. Disappointed at her father, Chi-lan and Ko become a pair of vigilantes and battle against evil forces.

== Cast and roles ==
- Simon Yam as Ko Tin-lap
- Chingmy Yau as Lui Chi-lan
- Wan Yeung-ming as Lui Chan-sam, father of Lui Chi-lan
- Gregory Charles Rivers as Officer John
- Kingdom Yuen as Tin-lap's wife
- Ng Yip-kwong as Lui Yau-choi
- Tam Suk-mui as Wai-ling
- Stuart Ong as Lam Tak-sing
- Wong Lai-mui as Wong Lai-mui
- Chan Chi-fai as Gangster injured by saw
- Nam Yin as Wai
- Frankie Ng as Wing
- Jack Wong as Wing's fellow
- Kenji Tanigaki as Wing's fellow
- Raven Choi as Man who robs Yau-choi
- Yiu Man-kei as Yau-choi's bodyguard
- So Wai-nam as Yau-choi's bodyguard
- Kong Foo-keung as Policeman
- Terrence Fok as Protesting tenant
- Tong Wai-hung
- William Leung as Parking warden
- Tony Chow as Man robbed by Tin-lap on yacht
- Leung Kwok-wai
- Kai Cheung-lung as Wai's dining associate
- Simon Cheung as Policeman
- Cheuk Man as Policeman
- Hon Ping as Policeman
- Woo Wing-tat
- Kwan Yung
- Mak Wai-cheung
