= The Romancing Star III =

1989 Hong Kong film by Sherman Wong

- DVD cover
- Traditional Chinese: 精裝追女仔之3狼之一族
- Simplified Chinese: 精裝追女仔之3狼之一族
- Hanyu Pinyin: Jīng Zhuāng Zhuī Zǚ Zǎi Zhī Sān Láng Zhī Yī Zú
- Jyutping: Zing1 Zong1 Zeoi1 Neoi5 Zai2 Saam1 Zi1 Long4 Zi1 Jat1 Zeok6
- Directed by: Sherman Wong
- Screenplay by: Wong Jing
- Produced by: Wong Jing
- Starring: Stanley Fung; Wong Jing; Lawrence Cheng; James Wong; Shing Fui-On; Sam Christopher Chan; Andy Lau; Sharla Cheung; Chingmy Yau; Vivian Chow; Wanda Yung
- Cinematography: Lee San-yip
- Edited by: Robert Choi
- Music by: James Wong; Sherman Chow
- Production company: Win's Movie Productions
- Distributed by: Win's Entertainment; Gala Film Distribution Limited
- Release date: 21 December 1989
- Running time: 93 minutes
- Country: Hong Kong
- Language: Cantonese
- Box office: HK$10,399,779

The Romancing Star III is a 1989 Hong Kong romantic comedy film directed by Sherman Wong and starring Stanley Fung, Wong Jing, Lawrence Cheng, James Wong, Shing Fui-On, Sam Christopher Chan and guest stars Andy Lau, the star of The Romancing Star II.

== Plot ==
Chow Si-pak (Shing Fui-On), Dried Pork (Wong Jing), Lo Ka-ying (Lawrence Cheng and Yo (Sam Christopher Chan) are cousins who are unemployed. Later, they get jobs at Ken Lau's (Stanley Fung) car garage. Lau's rival, Bluffer Wong (James Wong), has a competing business that employs young girls as the mechanics. The girls are spectacularly attractive, and include Wong's sister in-law, Man, (Sharla Cheung) and his three daughters Ching (Chingmy Yau), Man-man (Vivian Chow and Tak (Wanda Yung), meaning the boys are primed to chase them all over Hong Kong. But they lack the skills to woo the ladies, so they call the Love Doctor, Ken's nephew Lau Pei (Andy Lau), who teaches them the unbeatable "13 Ways to Seduce a Woman".

== Cast ==
- Stanley Fung as Ken Lau Ting-kin
- Wong Jing as Dried Pork
- Lawrence Cheng as Lo Ka Ying
- James Wong as Bluffer Wong
- Shing Fui-On as Chow Si-pak
- Sam Christopher Chan as Yo
- Andy Lau as Lau Pei (guest star)
- Sharla Cheung as Auntie Man
- Chingmy Yau as Ching
- Vivian Chow as Man-man
- Wanda Yung as Tak
- Chow Yun-fat as Mechanic in flashback (uncredited cameo;archive footage)
- Felix Lok as Mr. Kwan
- Sandra Ng as Cocktail waitress at disco
- Yiu Yau-hung as Yiu Siu-hung
- Jo Jo Ngan as Mr. Kwan's dancing partner
- Hung Law-fat
- Philip Chan
- Yu Mo-lin as Miss Oyster
- Jameson Law as Theatre patron scolded by Pak
- Dennis Chan as Theatre manager
- Frankie Chan as Gay patron in restaurant in Vancouver
- Fung King-man as Darkie Fung
- Chow Kong as Darkie Fung's man
- Cheung Kwok-wah as Darkie Fung's man
- Shing Fuk-on as Mr. Kwan's bodyguard
- Chan Wai-yue as Dance contest judge
- Seung Koon-yuk as Beauty parlour manager
- Michelle Sze-ma as Greedy Miss Oyster
- Yat-poon Chai as Police Sergeant
- Bonnie Fu as Chinese opera actress
- Ling Hon as Chinese opera boss
- Charlie Cho as Chinese opera actor
- Ng Kwok-kin as Police Officer
- Fei Pak as policeman

== Box office ==
The film grossed HK$10,399,779 at the Hong Kong box office during its theatrical run from 21 December 1989 to 23 January 1990 in Hong Kong.

== See also ==
- Andy Lau filmography
- Wong Jing filmography
