= The Crazy Companies II =

1988 Hong Kong film by Wong Jing

- Thai film poster

Chinese name
- Traditional Chinese: 最佳損友闖情關
- Simplified Chinese: 最佳损友闯情关
Transcriptions
Standard Mandarin
- Hanyu Pinyin: Zuì Jiā Sǔn You Chuǎng Qíng Guān
Yue: Cantonese
- Jyutping: Zeoi3 Gaai1 Syun2 Jau2 Cong2 Cing4 Gwaaan1
- Directed by: Wong Jing
- Screenplay by: Wong Jing
- Produced by: Jimmy Heung
- Starring: Andy Lau; Natalis Chan; Stanley Fung; Lawrence Ng; Charlie Cho; Shing Fui-On; Carol Cheng; Rosamund Kwan; Chingmy Yau; Sandra Ng
- Cinematography: Joe Chan
- Edited by: Robert Choi
- Music by: Lowell Lo
- Production company: Win's Entertainment
- Release date: 15 December 1988
- Running time: 97 minutes
- Country: Hong Kong
- Language: Cantonese
- Box office: HK$16,876,078

The Crazy Companies II (最佳損友闖情關) is a 1988 Hong Kong comedy film directed by Wong Jing starring Andy Lau, Sandra Ng and Natalis Chan.

== Summary ==
The sequel to The Crazy Companies sees Kwai (Andy Lau) and his buddies return. Following straight on from the first movie, it starts with the wedding of Horny (Pak-cheung Chan) to his overbearing fiancée Doriana (Sandra Ng).

At the reception we learn that the Kwai's brother is in financial trouble and the company is going to be bought over by Fok's thanks to the meddling of evil executive Robert Cheng. After the takeover, Kwai, Horny, Frank and Kim must get jobs with Fok's and rise up the corporate ladder again before Robert Cheng returns from his 3-month vacation.

== Cast ==
- Andy Lau - Tsui Ting-kwai
- Natalis Chan - Tam Sad-Chiu
- Stanley Fung - Frank
- Lawrence Ng - Robery Cheng
- Charlie Cho - Sau Hau-Kei
- Shing Fui-On - Wut Yuan
- Carol Cheng - Falishanna
- Rosamund Kwan - Niko
- Chingmy Yau - Kimmy
- Sandra Ng - Dorlina
- Chan Fai-hung
- Jamie Chik
- Hui Ying-Sau - Tsui Ying-sau
- Lau Siu-Ming - Fok Ka-tung
- Albert Lo - Manager Law
- Law Lan - Kimmy's mum
- Michael Miu
- Pak Yan - Niko's mum
- Joan Tong Lai-Kau - Happy
- Wong Sen
- Yip Wing-Cho - Wut Tak-king
- Yung Sai-Kit - Tsui Ting-Fu

== See also ==
- Andy Lau filmography
- Wong Jing filmography
