= Perfect Match (1989 film) =

1989 Hong Kong film by Dennis Chan

- Film poster
- Traditional Chinese: 最佳男朋友
- Simplified Chinese: 最佳男朋友
- Hanyu Pinyin: Zuì Jiā Nán Péng Yǒu
- Jyutping: Zeoi3 Gaai1 Naam4 Pang4 Yau2
- Directed by: Dennis Chan
- Screenplay by: Wong Jing
- Produced by: Wong Jing
- Starring: Andy Lau; George Lam; Carol Cheng; Ellen Chan; David Wu
- Cinematography: Gigo Lee
- Edited by: Robert Choi
- Music by: Joseph Chan
- Production company: Win's Movie Production
- Distributed by: Win's Entertainment
- Release date: 17 March 1989
- Running time: 92 minutes
- Country: Hong Kong
- Language: Cantonese
- Box office: HK11,583,955

Perfect Match (in Chinese 最佳男朋友) is a 1989 Hong Kong romantic comedy film directed by Dennis Chan and starring Andy Lau, George Lam and Carol Cheng.

== Plot ==
In the boardrooms and hallways of the fiercely competitive "Lok's Toy Company", where employees vie for the top management position while trading verbal barbs and romantic overtures. According to the passed director of the Lok's Toy Company, his properties were divided to his niece Lok Ka Kei and nephew Lok Ka Sing. However, Sing's share will be temporarily held by Kei until she marries. Sing then sends his followers to date Kei and hopes she will soon get married. However, all of them fail because Kei falls in love with the company's chief designer Peter Lai. Finally, after solving certain misunderstandings, Sing realizes his fault and decides to run the business on his own.

== Cast ==
- Andy Lau as Lok Ka Sing
- George Lam as Peter Lai
- Carol Cheng as Lok Ka Kei
- Ellen Chan as Salina
- David Wu as David Shek
- Meg Lam as Mrs. Peter Lai
- Shing Fui-On as Joseph
- Manfred Wong as Ka Wei
- Yiu Yau Hung as Q
- Wai Kei Shun as Uncle Chu
- Chingmy Yau as Gynaecologist
- Soh Hang-suen as Mrs. Lam
- Natalis Chan as Security guard
- Wong Jing as Security guard
- Charlie Cho as Security guard
- Lo Fan as Guest at Mr. Lok's funeral
- Dennis Chan as Dr. Dennis Kwong
- Alex Ng as Chauffeur Sing
- Frankie Chan as Muscle customer of hawker stall
- Jim James as Funeral attendee
- Ernest Mauser as Funeral attendee

== Box office ==
The film grossed HK11,583,955 at the Hong Kong box office during its theatrical run from 17 March to 12 April 1989 in Hong Kong.
