= Diana Pang (Chinese politician) =

Chinese dancer and actress

- Chinese: 彭丹
- Born: 10 November 1972 (age 53); Changsha, Hunan, China
- Occupations: Actress; dancer

Diana Pang (Chinese: 彭丹; born 10 November 1972) is a former Hong Kong actress and now a politician. She is a member of the Chinese People's Political Consultative Conference, and is currently the president of the Institute of International Economic Strategy. Her grandfather served as deputy mayor of Zunyi City.

== Early life ==
Pang was born on 10 November 1972 in Changsha, Hunan.

She was a member of Beijing Ballet Troupe for three years (1990). Her family moved to the US in 1990, and she entered the Dance Faculty of Juilliard School, New York City, to study ballet.

== Career ==
In the 1990s, Pang's acting career began after she moved to mainland China and starred in a Canadian film, Chinese Chocolate (1995), directed by Yan Cui. In Chinese Chocolate, Pang was Jesse, a Chinese immigrant in Canada. The film is about two Chinese women, a dancer and a doctor, and it focused on the bitter and sweet lives of sexuality of Chinese immigrants in Canada. Pang is credited as Diana Peng.

Pang then moved to Hong Kong, with her debut film being Wong Jing's 1995 The Saint of the Gamblers. She starred mostly in Category III films.

Pang's other low-budget films are Evil Instinct (1996), Hong Kong Showgirls (1996), The Imp (1996). She is now retired.

== Filmography ==
=== Films ===
- 1995 Chinese Chocolate – Jesse
- 1995 The Saint of Gamblers – Hokei
- 1995 Midnight Caller – Chow Mei-Si
- 1996 Another Chinese Cop – Mindy
- 1996 Dangerous Duty – Ling Peidan
- 1996 Hong Kong Show Girls – Tai-Dan Mei-Si
- 1996 How to Meet the Lucky Stars – Nurse
- 1996 The Imp – Ching Kwok-Shan/Fun-Fun.
- 1996 Midnight Express in Orient – David's Wife
- 1996 The Six Devil Women – Man Nap
- Hong Kong Pie (2001)
- X Imp (1999) – Aunt Fak
- Hong Kong Spice Gals (1999) – The Policewoman
- Brother Forever (1999) (uncredited) – Sister Nah
- Loving Girl (1999)
- Web of Deception (1997) – Jessica
- All's Well, Ends Well 1997 (1997) – Girlfriend
- Made in Heaven (1997) – Sheila
- Evil Instinct (1997) – Wendy Pang

=== Television ===
- Demi-Gods and Semi-Devils (2003) – Qin Hongmian
- Amazing Detective Di Renjie (2004) – Li Qingxia
- Journey to the West (2010) – Baozhu
