= Raped by an Angel =

1993 Hong Kong film by Andrew Lau

- DVD cover
- Directed by: Wai-keung Lau
- Written by: Jing Wong
- Produced by: Dennis Chan; Wong Jing
- Starring: Dennis Chan; Simon Yam; Jacqueline Ng
- Distributed by: Gala Film Distribution Limited
- Release date: 27 May 1993
- Running time: 95 minutes
- Country: Hong Kong
- Language: Cantonese

Raped by an Angel a.k.a. Naked Killer 2 (香港奇案之強姦; pinyin: Xiang Gang qi an zhi qiang jian) is a 1993 Category III Hong Kong film directed by Andrew Lau, with a screenplay by Wong Jing. The Hong Kong Chinese actor Mark Cheng is shown naked in the film, as he walks around a room, with his genitals briefly shown on screen.

== Prequel and sequel ==
Alternatively titled Naked Killer 2 a.k.a. Legal Rape a.k.a. Super Rape, the movie is a semi-sequel to the 1992 film Naked Killer directed by Clarence Fok Yiu-leung. In fact, the main link between the two films is the reunion of Simon Yam and Chingmy Yau, who play different roles. It was followed by four other movies:

- Raped by an Angel 2: The Uniform Fan (1998), directed by Aman Chang
- Raped by an Angel 3: Sexual Fantasy of the Chief Executive (1998), directed by Aman Chang
- Raped by an Angel 4: The Raper's Union (1999), directed by Wong Jing
- Raped by an Angel 5: The Final Judgement (2000), directed by Billy Tang Hin-Shing

Raped by an Angel 1, 3 and 4 are rated Category III, while 2 and 5 are rated Category IIB.

== Cast and roles ==
- Dennis Chan – Professor Chan
- Mark Cheng – Chuck Chi-shing
- Linda Cheung – Girl in Opening Sequence
- Nick Cheung
- Lee Siu-Kei
- Jacqueline Ng – Chu Kit-Man
- Simon Yam – Tso Tat Wah
- Chingmy Yau – Yau Yuk-nam
- Yuen King-Tan – Turkey
