= Royal Tramp II =

1992 Hong Kong film by Wong Jing

- Film poster
- 鹿鼎記II神龍教
- Directed by: Wong Jing
- Screenplay by: Wong Jing
- Based on: The Deer and the Cauldron by Jin Yong
- Produced by: Stephen Shiu; Jimmy Heung
- Starring: Stephen Chow; Brigitte Lin; Natalis Chan; Sandra Ng; Chingmy Yau; Michelle Reis; Damian Lau; Deric Wan
- Cinematography: David Chung
- Edited by: Chuen Chi
- Music by: William Hu
- Production companies: Golden Harvest; Win's Movie Productions
- Distributed by: Fortune Star Media Limited
- Release date: 24 September 1992
- Running time: 93 minutes
- Country: Hong Kong
- Language: Cantonese
- Box office: HK$36,583,964

Royal Tramp II (鹿鼎記II神龍教) is a 1992 Hong Kong wuxia comedy film loosely adapted from the novel The Deer and the Cauldron by Jin Yong. The film is a sequel to Royal Tramp, which was released earlier in the same year.

== Synopsis ==
Having had her cover blown in the previous film, the fake Empress Dowager returns to the Mystic Dragon Cult and takes over the cult's leadership position, assuming her real identity as Long'er and pledging to support Wu Sangui's planned rebellion against the Qing dynasty.

Wei Xiaobao is attacked by the apprentices of the "One-Armed Divine Nun" Jiunan but he subdues them and tries to take advantage of them. Wu Yingxiong, Wu Sangui's son, exposes his lies. Scorned and unaware of Wu Yingxiong's status, Wei sends his men after Wu, but Long'er, in disguise as Wu's bodyguard, fends them off.

At the palace, the Kangxi Emperor, having caught wind of Wu Sangui's plot, arranges for Princess Jianning to marry Wu Yingxiong and assigns Wei to oversee the wedding in Yunnan while keeping a close eye on Wu Sangui's activities. This complicates Wei's relationship with Jianning when she tells him she is pregnant with his child.

Jiunan and her apprentice Ake later ambush the procession. Fighting to a standstill with Long'er, the assailants escape with Wu Yingxiong and Wei. Wei garners some respect from Jiunan when he reveals his undercover identity as a Tiandihui member. Long'er finally catches up with them at an inn but only manages to rescue Wei. Having been saved by Wu Yingxiong before, Ake elopes with him amidst the confusion.

At the Mystic Dragon Cult, Wu Yingxiong and Feng Xifan secretly poison Long'er and turn her followers against her. She escapes with Wei but must have sex with a man before dawn, otherwise she will die. However, this will transfer most of her neigong to whomever she sleeps with. Despite Wei's lecherous personality, Long'er accepts his blunt honesty as a sign of virtue and chooses to lose her virginity to him and becomes his third wife.

When Wei gets back to Jianning, they execute a plan to castrate Wu Yingxiong. With her betrothed no longer able to produce heirs, the princess is taken by Wei as his fourth wife. Enraged by the loss of his manhood, Wu Yingxiong prematurely rebels against the Qing dynasty. He tasks Feng Xifan with killing Jianning and Wei, but Chen Jinnan intervenes and helps them escape.

Later, Jiunan captures Wu Yingxiong and Ake, and offers them to Wei, who pardons Ake and takes her as his fifth wife. Afterwards, Feng Xifan is promoted when he surrenders Wu Sangui's battle plans and Chen Jinnan to the Kangxi Emperor. Given Wei's muddied history with the Tiandihui, the emperor tasks him with overseeing Chen's execution. Wei's newfound power is difficult for him to control, and Chen helps him master it in time for him to use it against Feng Xifan. Wei also uncovers the secret of the Sutra of Forty-two Chapters after burning them in frustration, revealing hidden map coordinates to the location of the highly-coveted treasure.

In order to save Chen Jinnan, Wei kills Feng Xifan with his newly acquired skills after falling into a hidden cave where the treasure is found, and swaps Feng's dead body with Chen before the execution, sparing Chen from death. Just as he was about to escape with his wives and Chen, the emperor arrives with his troops, having been informed by Wei's opportunistic friend Duolong, who is now involved romantically with Wei's sister. Seeing that they are friends, his sister is in love with Wei, and with Wei bluffing that he is strong enough to defeat the emperor and his entire army if he wants, the emperor lets them go, declaring that Wei has died and no longer exists as far as he is concerned. Wei laughs afterward that the emperor has fallen for his bluff.

== Cast ==
- Stephen Chow as Wei Xiaobao
- Brigitte Lin as Long'er
- Chingmy Yau as Princess Jianning
- Michelle Reis as Ake
- Natalis Chan as Duolong
- Damian Lau as Chen Jinnan
- Deric Wan as the Kangxi Emperor
- Paul Chun as Wu Sangui
- Kent Tong as Wu Yingxiong
- Sandra Ng as Wei Chunhua
- Fennie Yuen and Vivian Chan as the Shuang'er twins
- Yen Shi-kwan as Feng Xifan
- Helen Ma as Jiunan
- Sharla Cheung as the Empress Dowager
- Law Lan as the Mystic Dragon Cult's founder
