= The Saint of Gamblers =

1995 Hong Kong film by Wong Jing

- Film poster

Chinese name
- Traditional Chinese: 賭聖2之街頭賭聖
- Simplified Chinese: 赌圣2之街头赌圣
Transcriptions
Standard Mandarin
- Hanyu Pinyin: Dǎo Xéng Ěr Zhī Jiā Toū Dǎo Xéng
Yue: Cantonese
- Jyutping: Dou2 Sing3 Ji6 Zi1 Gaai1 Tau Dou2 Sing3
- Directed by: Wong Jing
- Written by: Wong Jing
- Produced by: Wong Jing
- Starring: Eric Kot; Chingmy Yau; Ng Man Tat; Diana Pang; Natalis Chan; Donnie Yen
- Cinematography: Andrew Lau
- Edited by: Ma Go
- Music by: Lee Hon Kam; Marco Wan
- Production company: Wong Jing's Workshop Ltd.
- Distributed by: Golden Harvest
- Release date: 28 June 1995
- Running time: 98 minutes
- Country: Hong Kong
- Language: Cantonese
- Box office: HK$13,111,400

The Saint of Gamblers (賭聖2之街頭賭聖) is a 1995 Hong Kong film directed by Wong Jing. It is a spin-off of the All for the Winner series, with only Ng Man Tat reprising his role.

== Cast ==
- Natalis Chan as the announcer
- John Ching as Tung
- Eric Kot as God Bless You
- Chingmy Yau as Yuen Fan
- Donnie Yen as Lone Seven
- Ashton Chen as Siu-Loong
- Ng Man-tat as Uncle Tat
- Ben Lam as Ray Thai
- Andy Cheng as Ray's Thug
- Lee Tat Chiu as Ray's Thug
- Lai Sing Kwong as Ray's thug
- Fung Wai Lun as Ray's Thug
- Jack Wong as Ray's Thug
- Mai Wai Cheung as Ray's Thug
- Adam Chan as Ray's Thug
- Chan Siu Wah as Ray's Thug
- Diana Pang as Hokei
- Shing Fui-On as an assassin
- William Tuen as a Japanese gambler
- Manfred Wong as a dwarf
- Corey Yuen as a mahjong player
