= Prince Charming (1999 film) =

Hong Kong romantic comedy film by Wong Jing

- Film poster

Chinese name
- Traditional Chinese: 黑馬王子
- Simplified Chinese: 黑马王子
Transcriptions
Standard Mandarin
- Hanyu Pinyin: Hēi Mǎ Wáng Zǐ
Yue: Cantonese
- Jyutping: Hak1 Maa2 Wong4 Zi 2
- Directed by: Wong Jing
- Screenplay by: Wong Jing
- Produced by: Wong Jing
- Starring: Andy Lau; Michelle Reis; Deanie Ip; Suki Kwan; Nick Cheung; Yu Rongguang
- Cinematography: Jimmy Choi
- Edited by: Marco Mak
- Music by: Lincoln Lo
- Production companies: Win's Entertainment; BoB and Partners
- Distributed by: China Star Entertainment
- Release date: 1 April 1999
- Running time: 95 minutes
- Country: Hong Kong
- Language: Cantonese
- Box office: HK$15,309,865

Prince Charming is a 1999 Hong Kong romantic comedy film produced, written and directed by Wong Jing and starring Andy Lau as the titular Prince Charming "Wah Dee", which shares the same name as his role in the classic film A Moment of Romance.

== Plot ==
Wah Dee (Andy Lau) is low level punk living in Mongkok with his mother Fei (Deanie Ip) and works as a motorcycle messenger and sells bootlegged VCDs. Wah was recently dumped by his girlfriend. Later he meets Ice Pok (Michelle Reis), a rich heiress from Shanghai, who followed her father on a business trip to Hong Kong where she solely searches for her mother who have divorced with her father during her childhood. Ice's father Po Ting Kwok (Yu Rongguang) calls the police when his daughter goes missing and suspects Wah after sending people to investigate. Unexpectedly, Ice was abducted by kidnappers and Wah bravely rescues her by himself and donates half of his liver for Ice to heal. Ice returned to Shanghai after rehabilitation and finds herself in love with Wah. On the day of her birthday, her father organises a party for her and introduce a "Prince Charming" to her. The "Prince Charming" turns out to be Wah, who is dressed handsomely in a formal outfit, as opposed to his usual casual clothing and messy hairstyle.

== Cast ==
- Andy Lau as Wah Dee
- Michelle Reis as Ice Pok
- Deanie Ip as Aunt Fei
- Suki Kwan as Salad
- Nick Cheung as Tart
- Yu Rongguang as Pok Ting Kwok
- William Duen as Mr. Fat
- Fiona Yuen as Margaret
- Jimmy Wong as Albert
- Lam Sheung Yee as Catholic Priest
- Liu Yuen
- Pau Hiu Wah
- Kong Foo Keung as Ben
- Chow Mei Shing as Kidnapper
- Cheang Pou-soi as Waiter
- Eddie Che as Hotel Security Guard
- Vincent Chik as Hotel Security Guard
- Aman Chang as Movie director
- Cheung Yuk Wah as Organised Crime Bureau officer
- Chang Kin Yung as Policeman

== Theme song ==
- Boyfriend (男朋友)
  - Composer: Kevin Lin
  - Lyricist: Andy Lau, Kevin Lin
  - Singer: Andy Lau

== Box office ==
The film grossed HK$15,309,865 at the Hong Kong box office during its theatrical run from 1 April to 6 May 1999 in Hong Kong.
