= Royal Tramp =

1992 Hong Kong film by Wong Jing

- Film poster
- 鹿鼎記
- Directed by: Wong Jing
- Screenplay by: Wong Jing
- Based on: The Deer and the Cauldron by Jin Yong
- Produced by: Stephen Shiu; Jimmy Heung
- Starring: Stephen Chow; Sharla Cheung; Ng Man-tat; Natalis Chan; Sandra Ng; Chingmy Yau; Damian Lau; Brigitte Lin; Deric Wan
- Cinematography: David Chung; Joe Chan
- Edited by: Chuen Chi
- Music by: William Hu
- Production companies: Golden Harvest; Win's Movie Productions
- Distributed by: Fortune Star Media Limited
- Release date: 30 July 1992
- Running time: 110 minutes
- Country: Hong Kong
- Language: Cantonese
- Box office: HK$40,862,831

Royal Tramp (鹿鼎記) is a 1992 Hong Kong wuxia comedy film loosely adapted from the novel The Deer and the Cauldron by Jin Yong. The film was one of the five top grossing Hong Kong films in 1992. Stephen Chow, who portrayed the protagonist Wei Xiaobao, also starred in the other four of those films. The film was followed by a sequel, Royal Tramp II, in the same year.

== Synopsis ==
The film is set in 17th-century China during the Qing dynasty. Wei Xiaobao is the brother of Wei Chunhua, a prostitute. By chance, he saves Chen Jinnan, the leader of the anti-Qing organisation Tiandihui, and becomes Chen's apprentice. The Tiandihui sends Wei as a spy to infiltrate the imperial palace to steal the Sutra of Forty-two Chapters.

In the palace, Wei pretends to be a eunuch, and meets the young Kangxi Emperor by coincidence, sparring with the emperor and becoming his trusted aide. He also makes enemies with the Empress Dowager. The emperor also introduces Wei to his bodyguard Duolong and orders them to help him get rid of Oboi, the overbearing regent. Duolong and Wei's attempt to assassinate Oboi fails, but Oboi gets defeated by the Empress Dowager eventually.

While confiscating Oboi's property on the emperor's order, Wei uses the chance to embezzle much of Oboi's wealth before returning to the brothel to free his sister. He is also sent by the Tiandihui to infiltrate the palace again and find an opportunity to assassinate the emperor and Oboi. The twins Shuang'er are instructed by the Tiandihui to accompany Wei on his mission, and they promise to marry him if he succeeds. The twins get into a love rivalry with the emperor's sister Princess Jianning, who also wants Wei to marry her.

By then, the Empress Dowager has discovered Wei's identity as a Tiandihui spy, while Wei has also learnt that she is an imposter. Wei is captured and imprisoned with Oboi, but Oboi's followers free Oboi and escape with Wei as their hostage. They encounter Chen and the Tiandihui members, and both sides clash. Oboi is ultimately killed by Chen, and everyone is surrounded by soldiers led by the Empress Dowager imposter. Just then, Jianning shows up with the real Empress Dowager and exposes the imposter, who fights her way out and swears vengeance on Wei.

== Cast ==
- Stephen Chow as Wei Xiaobao
- Deric Wan as the Kangxi Emperor
- Sharla Cheung as the Empress Dowager
- Ng Man-tat as Hai Dafu
- Sandra Ng as Wei Chunhua
- Brigitte Lin as Long'er
- Chingmy Yau as Princess Jianning
- Damian Lau as Chen Jinnan
- Natalis Chan as Duolong
- Fennie Yuen and Vivian Chan as the Shuang'er twins
- Elvis Tsui as Oboi
- Lee Ka-ding as the brothel owner
- Lau Kong as the Qingmu lodge master
