= To Live and Die in Mongkok =

2009 Hong Kong film by Wong Jing and Billy Chung

- Film poster
- Directed by: Wong Jing; Billy Chung
- Written by: Wong Jing
- Produced by: Wong Jing
- Starring: Nick Cheung
- Cinematography: Choi Sung Fai
- Edited by: Li Ka-wing
- Music by: Lincoln Lo
- Production company: Mega-Vision Pictures (MVP)
- Distributed by: Mega-Vision Pictures (MVP)
- Release date: 19 November 2009
- Running time: 95 minutes
- Country: Hong Kong
- Language: Cantonese

To Live and Die in Mongkok (traditional Chinese: 旺角監獄; simplified Chinese: 旺角监狱) is a 2009 Hong Kong drama thriller film directed by Wong Jing and Billy Chung.

== Synopsis ==
Fai, a legendary triad figure, is convicted and sent to prison for life for slaughtering rival gangsters in a gang fight. A local council member assists him with his parole, leading to his subsequent early release from prison 30 years later. However, Mongkok has completely changed and he has almost forgotten his way back home.

Fai's fellow gangster Porky is due to take over as head of their triad gang after years of service, but his personality is deemed unsuitable as a leader. Another member in the gang, Peter, also has interests set in becoming the leader. It becomes apparent that both Porky and Peter may be using Fai as a pawn in their game towards winning the grand prize.

It emerged that on that fateful night 30 years before, Fai was shot by a policeman, Yue, who is now a major figure within the police force because he had managed to shoot Fai and therefore ensuring his arrest. Yue turns out to be someone with his own agenda as well, but things are not always as they seem and there is a different story to be told.

Meanwhile, Porky has unseemly interests in Pamela, a prostitute who became a love interest of Fai, as well as her younger sister, who is mentally disabled. Porky constantly makes crude sexual advances towards the sisters, only to have Fai rescue them on numerous occasions, which causes further friction between them.

== Cast ==
- Nick Cheung - Fai
- Paw Hee-Ching - Fai's mother
- Liu Kai-Chi - Cop
- Chan Lai-wun - Social worker
- Monica Mok - Pamela
- Natalie Meng - Penny
- Willie Wai - Porky
- Juno Leung
- Patrick Tam - Peter

== Reception ==
Screen Anarchy commented, "More frustrating than anything else, however, is a notable onscreen lamentation that Hong Kong audiences are no longer interested in going to see local movies. The film quite clearly suggests that it is the audiences' and exhibitors' fault for not supporting locally made product, rather than suggest the industry's dwindling profit margin might be attributed to poorly written and directed films, serving as little more than pre-packaged publicity opportunities for pop stars and product placement. "

== See also ==
- To Live and Die in Tsimshatsui
