= Return to a Better Tomorrow =

1994 Hong Kong film by Wong Jing

- Film poster

Chinese name
- Traditional Chinese: 新英雄本色
Transcriptions
- Directed by: Wong Jing
- Screenplay by: Wong Jing
- Produced by: Wong Jing
- Starring: Lau Ching-wan; Cheng Yee-kin; Wong Man-tak
- Cinematography: Cheng Siu-keung
- Edited by: Marco Mak
- Music by: Marco Wan; Lee Hon-kam
- Production companies: GH Pictures; Golden Harvest Pictures; Good Standard International; Wong Jing's Workshop Ltd.
- Distributed by: Golden Harvest Company
- Release date: 14 July 1994 (Hong Kong)
- Running time: 103 minutes
- Country: Hong Kong
- Language: Cantonese
- Box office: HK $8,177,647

Return to a Better Tomorrow is a 1994 Hong Kong action film directed by Wong Jing. It is an in-name-only remake of the 1986 film A Better Tomorrow featuring different characters and a different story.

== Plot ==
Triad member Tong Chun and his gang attack rival triad boss Black Ox in a movie theater, but Black Ox uses his girlfriend as a human shield and escapes. Outside he his shot three times by Big Lobster, who brags of his feat to Tong Chun but is shot in the back by Black Ox. Tong Chun fires the fatal shot at Black Ox and takes Big Lobster to the hospital, where the police demand his help with an ongoing case. At a meeting with the police the next day, he learns that the Hong Kong police are working with the FBI to frame him as drug dealer in an attempt to rid Hong Kong of undesirables before its upcoming handover to China. Lobster Tsui recovers in the hospital but returns home to find that his wife has locked his daughter Little Lobster in a cage with the dog and is sleeping with Bill, another triad member. During a fight, Bill accidentally kills Big Lobster's wife before being pushed out a window to his death by Big Lobster. The police charge Big Lobster with the murder of his wife, but Tong Chun enlists the aid of Barrister Wong, who capably defends Big Lobster at trial and obtains his release.

Black Ox's men attack their rivals in a restaurant, but Tong Chun and Big Lobster kill them off and manage to survive as well as save the injured Lui Wei. Back at his headquarters, Tong Chun is arrested over a significant amount of drugs that have been planted there. Lui Wei sends Holland Boy, who kills several officers while helping Tong Chun escape, angering Tong Chun, who feels this makes him look guilty. Lui Wei sends Tong Chun and Chiu to hide out in Mainland China, where Holland Boy kills Chiu and attempts to kill Tong Chun on Lui Wei's orders to cover up for Lui Wei's own drug smuggling activities. Tong Chun survives and escapes to Vietnam after sending Chili a message that Lui Wei has betrayed them. Chili attempts to kill Lui Wei herself, but is caught and disfigured by Holland Boy.

Two years later, Tong Chun has returned to Hong Kong without any ID and is working as a cook. His boss Fred Simon's son Duke Simon is kidnapped for a ransom by thugs working for a triad named Panther, so Tong Chun and Fred seek help from Big Lobster, who has become a powerful triad member in the meantime. Big Lobster's men quickly rescue Duke and apprehend one thug who cut his ear, but Big Lobster follows his sworn older brother's advice and lets the man live. Tong Chun advises Big Lobster that Lui Wei has been helping him advance in the criminal underworld in order to later use him as a scapegoat for his drug dealings the way he did to Tong Chun, so Big Lobster confronts Lui Wei about the case Lui Wei is building against Big Lobster with the FBI and says that he is splitting up with Lui Wei. Tong Chun finds Chili, who has become a heroin addict due to the pain she still feels from her time being tortured by Holland Boy. Big Lobster's place is raided by the police on a tip from Duke, who is secretly an undercover cop, but they do not find what they are looking for. Big Lobster's place is then raided by Holland Boy and his men, who kill Big Lobster as well as his daughter Little Lobster in front of Duke before Duke kills Holland Boy.

At the police station, Lui Wei tells the police that he wasn't there at the time of the murders, and Barrister Wong throws coffee on him instead of helping him. Lui Wei goes into the restroom to clean up, where Tong Chun shoots him. The police handcuff Tong Chung, and Lui Wei reveals that he was wearing a bulletproof vest, then leaves laughing. Duke arrives and has his weapon stolen by Tong Chung, who escapes by holding Duke at gunpoint. Tong Chung pursues Lui Wei and ultimately kills him with the help of Duke. The final scene reveals that Chili, who has recovered from drug abuse, has given up waiting for Tong Chun.

== Cast ==
- Lau Ching-wan as "Big Lobster" Tsui
- Cheng Yee-kin as Tong Chun
- Wong Man-tak as Duke Simon
- Yau Suk-ching as Chili
- Lam Kwok-bun as Lui Wei
- Ngai Sing as Holland Boy
- Jim Wong as Barrister Wong
- Pui Chun as Fred Simon
- Wong Pak-man as Detective But
- Chan Chi-fai as Bill Tung
- Leung Pui-chi as Ting Tong
- Ching Tung as Chiu
- Lo Meng as Black Ox
- Fung Chung-yee as Little Lobster
- Gary Mak as Uncle No. 5
- Yip Choi-nam as Assassin

== Release ==
The film ran in Hong Kong theaters from July 14 to July 27, 1994.

== Reception ==
Reviewer Joseph Kuby of cityonfire.com gave the film a rating of 9/10, writing, "This film is tragic, heart-felt, horrific and harrowing without being too sappy, schmaltzy or saccharine-saturated. The melodrama isn't as heavy-handed as John Woo's original (which is the one thing which gives Jing more of an advantage) and the action has just as much bite. But most importantly, with this being a crime thriller, no feelings are spared, no punches are pulled and there are no compromises – something which reflects the true nature of the world of crime."

Reviewer Jay Wassmer of brns.com gave the film a rating of 6/10, writing, "Return To A Better Tomorrow suffers from several problems, not the least of which is a very derivative script. Wong Jing is obviously trying to join the ranks of John Woo and Ringo Lam with this gangland opus. But, his lack of originality proves how special the filmmakers he's imitating really are."

Reviewer Darrenn Murray of Screen Anarchy wrote, "the film is one of Wong Jing's better efforts, and he seems to raise his game. It doesn't come close to the work of Woo or Hark, but it is an enjoyable exploitation action movie, happy enough to ride the coat tails of a Hong Kong classic. I wouldn't let the fact it being a rip off put you off seeking it out."

Reviewer Kozo of LoveHKfilm.com wrote, "Passable action helps compensate for a clichéd and frankly uninteresting gangland thriller which is meant to evoke warm and fuzzy memories of the John Woo original. Not surprisingly, the film fails at doing so." The review concludes, "This is one average, average film, and near-passable entertainment for the bored."

Reviewer Andrew Skeates of fareastfilms.com gave the film a score of 2.5/5 stars, writing, "Despite the tantalising title, this flick has nothing to do with John Woo's genre defining classics but is rather a cheap cash in from the relentless Wong Jing conveyor belt. 'Return to a Better Tomorrow' (RTABT) tries to emulate the themes and stylish action of Woo’s 'A Better Tomorrow' films but despite a couple of lively action beats and one or two decent performances, it’s just a case of seen it all before and seen it done better."

Reviewer Joey O'Bryan of The Austin Chronicle gave the film a rating of 2 out of 5 stars, writing, "the film is frustratingly both more than you expect and less than you might have hoped for -- a contradiction that fits this confused film like a glove."
