= Men Suddenly in Love =

2011 Hong Kong film by Wong Jing

- Film poster

Chinese name
- Traditional Chinese: 猛男滾死隊
- Simplified Chinese: 猛男滚死队
Transcriptions
Standard Mandarin
- Hanyu Pinyin: Měng Nán Gǔn Sǐ Duì
Yue: Cantonese
- Jyutping: Maang2 Naam4 Gwan2 Sei2 Deoi2
- Directed by: Wong Jing
- Written by: Wong Jing
- Produced by: Wong Jing
- Starring: Eric Tsang; Chapman To; Jim Chim; Wong Jing; Tat Dik
- Cinematography: Chow Lin Yau
- Edited by: Lee Kar Wing
- Music by: Day Tai
- Production company: Vigor Creative Production Limited
- Distributed by: Gala Film Distribution Limited
- Release date: 10 March 2011
- Running time: 89 minutes
- Country: Hong Kong
- Language: Cantonese

Men Suddenly in Love is a 2011 Hong Kong romantic comedy film produced by, written by and directed by Wong Jing. The film stars Eric Tsang, Chapman To, Jim Chim, Wong Jing and Tat Dik.

== Cast ==
- Eric Tsang as York Ng (吳郁仁)
- Chapman To as Keith Szeto (司徒奇峰)
- Jim Chim as Claude Cheung (張秋雲)
- Wong Jing as Sam Fu (傅武琛)
- Tat Dik as Charlie Lam (林查理)
- Richard Ng as Master Jude (朱老師)
- Chrissie Chau as Tina
- Carol Yeung as Jeanne (小倩)
- Jessica Xu as Audrey
- Caroline Zhu as Peril Ngai (倪險)
- Betrys Kong as Eleven
- Maggie Cheung as Hillary Lau (劉玉卿)
- Monica Chan as Nana Lam (林娜娜)
- Mak Ling Ling as Du Gu Ling Ling (獨孤靈靈)
- Jacqueline Chong as Lam Cha Lei's wife (林查理妻)
- Yeung Sze Man as Cheung Chau Wan's wife (張秋雲妻)
- Lee Kin-yan
