= Treasure Inn =

2011 Hong Kong film by Wong Jing and Corey Yuen

- HK poster

Chinese name
- Traditional Chinese: 財神客棧
- Simplified Chinese: 财神客栈
Transcriptions
Standard Mandarin
- Hanyu Pinyin: Cái Shén Kè Zhàn
Yue: Cantonese
- Jyutping: Coi^{4} San^{4} Haak^{3} Zaan^{2}
- Directed by: Wong Jing; Corey Yuen
- Written by: Wong Jing
- Produced by: Wong Jing
- Starring: Nicholas Tse; Nick Cheung; Charlene Choi; Liu Yang; Tong Dawei; Huang Yi
- Cinematography: Venus Keung
- Edited by: Li Ka-Wing
- Music by: Raymond Wong
- Production companies: Mega-Vision Pictures; Bona Film Group
- Distributed by: Distribution Workshop
- Release date: 23 June 2011
- Running time: 97 minutes
- Country: Hong Kong
- Language: Cantonese

Treasure Inn is a 2011 Hong Kong wuxia comedy film directed by Wong Jing and Corey Yuen, starring Nicholas Tse, Nick Cheung, Charlene Choi, Liu Yang, Tong Dawei and Huang Yi.

== Plot ==
Master Kung and Lo Pa are two low ranked constable of White Horse City, who have high skills but are underused. An opportunity to prove themselves arises when a robbery takes place at the home of the city's richest man, Ho Pak Man, in which his whole family is killed and the family treasure, the "White Jade Goddess of Mercy," is stolen. Their chance for glory is cut short, however, when the "Police God" Tit Mo Ching is called in to investigate the case. He bars Kung and Lo Pa from further participation in the investigation because of their low status.

Coincidentally, Master Kung and Lo Pa arrest a pair of twin sisters, Water Dragon Girl and Fire Dragon Girl, who always pretend to catch wanted criminals to get monetary rewards. The twin sisters know that the "White Jade Goddess of Mercy" would be brought to the "Treasure Inn" for an auction. Wanting to hit big, Master Kung and Lo Pa go to the "Treasure Inn" with the twin sisters to investigate the truth. During that time, Master Kung and Water Dragon Girl become lovers.

== Cast ==
- Nicholas Tse as Master Kung (龔少爺), a low ranking constable in the yamen kitchen and a skilled martial artist. He has a relationship with Water Dragon Girl.
- Nick Cheung as Lo Pa (老巴), a low ranking constable in the yamen kitchen and Master Kung's partner. He and Fire Dragon Girl become a couple.
- Charlene Choi as Water Dragon Girl (水龍女), the younger of the "Reward Money Hunters" twin sisters. She loves Master Kung.
- Huang Yi as Fire Dragon Girl (火龍女), the older of the "Reward Money Hunters" twin sisters. She is hot tempered. She and Lo Pa become a couple.
- Liu Yang as Yuk Ling-lung (玉玲瓏), the owner of Treasure Inn. She loves Master Kung.
- Tong Dawei as Man Man Chit (聞問切), a nerd who is actually a skilled martial artist and doctor. He loves Yuk Ling-lung.
- Kenny Ho as Tit Mo Ching (鐵無情), the primary antagonist and arch enemy of Master Kung and Lo Pa
- Boss as Seung Seung (上上), an imperial agent
- Hot Zhao as Siu Siu (小小), an imperial agent
- Zhao Yitong as District Lady (縣夫人), the mean and cocky wife of the mayor
- Zhang Xiaodong as God Eye Chu Sam (神眼朱三), a skilled martial artist with superhuman abilities

== Release ==
The film was released on 23 June 2011 in Hong Kong.

== Reception ==
=== Critical reception ===
Loong Wai Ting of The Malay Mail gave the film a mediocre review, described the film as "by far one of his [Director Wong Jing] better films and one can't help but to feel entertained by the movie" but "there is certainly no treasure". AsiaOne gave Treasure Inn a rating of 3.5 stars out of 5.

=== Box office ===
The Treasure Inn has been a box office success, grossing RMB81.4 million at the box office ($12.6 million) as of 12 July 2011.
