= My Kung-Fu Sweetheart =

2006 Hong Kong film by Wong Jing

- Film poster
- Directed by: Wong Jing
- Written by: Wong Jing
- Produced by: Wong Jing; Gao Fengjun
- Starring: Cecilia Cheung; Leo Ku; Yuen Wah
- Cinematography: Edmond Fung
- Edited by: Azrael Chung
- Production companies: Wong Jing's Workshop Ltd. Tianjin Film Studio
- Release date: 9 February 2006
- Running time: 90 minutes
- Country: Hong Kong
- Language: Cantonese

My Kung-Fu Sweetheart (simplified Chinese: 野蛮秘笈; traditional Chinese: 野蠻秘笈) is a 2006 Hong Kong film directed by Wong Jing.

== Cast ==
- Cecilia Cheung
- Leo Ku
- Yuen Wah
- Yuen Qiu
- Wong Jing
- Sammy Leung
- Yat-fei Wong
- Chin Kar-lok
- Lam Suet
- Benz Hui
- Lam Chi Chung
