= Tricky Brains =

1991 Hong Kong film by Wong Jing

- Film poster

Chinese name
- Traditional Chinese: 整蠱專家
- Simplified Chinese: 整蛊专家
Transcriptions
Standard Mandarin
- Hanyu Pinyin: Zhěng Gǔ Zhuān Jiā
Yue: Cantonese
- Jyutping: Zing2 Gu2 Zyun1 Gaa1
- Directed by: Wong Jing
- Written by: Wong Jing
- Produced by: Jimmy Heung
- Starring: Andy Lau; Stephen Chow; Rosamund Kwan; Chingmy Yau; Ng Man-tat; Waise Lee
- Cinematography: Peter Pau
- Edited by: Robert Choi
- Music by: Lowell Lo
- Production company: Win's Movie Production & I/E Co. Ltd.
- Distributed by: Newport Entertainment
- Release date: 2 February 1991
- Running time: 110 minutes
- Country: Hong Kong
- Language: Cantonese
- Box office: HK$31,388,471

Tricky Brains (Chinese: 整蠱專家), also known as The Ultimate Trickster, is a 1991 Hong Kong comedy film written and directed by Wong Jing, who also co-stars in the film. The film stars Andy Lau, Stephen Chow, Rosamund Kwan, Chingmy Yau, Ng Man-tat and Waise Lee.

== Plot ==
Jing Koo or Koo Jing is a self-proclaimed Trick Expert who has a wide range of tricks at his disposal, including many practical jokes and some more serious tricks which are capable of driving a person insane. He uses such tricks to accomplish whatever requests his clients give him. When he is hired by Macky Kam to ruin the relationship between Che Man-kit, an honest employee who works at the same company as Kam, and Lucy Ching, the company president's daughter whom Kam is romantically interested in, Jing sets up an act to get in the Che household as Kit's long lost younger brother Che Man-jing. Kit is suspicious of Jing at first, but is later convinced that Jing really is his brother and decides to treat him better. He gets Jing to work in the same company and introduces him to Lucy and her friend, Banana Fung, who later becomes interested in him.

From here Jing attempts to embarrass Kit in front of Lucy at every turn, which includes having Kit drink a cola can dosed with 'irresistible aphrodisiac', a medicine that makes the victim unable to control his sexual desires, but Kit avoids all of Jing's tricks (without suspecting him). It is not until a contract-signing event which Kit is responsible for that Jing succeeds, in which he makes everyone from his company leave the room and assaults the other party. As a result, Kit is fired. Seeing this, his father Yan Che also quits the company despite his retirement only a few months away.

That night, Jing prepares to leave the house, but is given a surprise 'birthday' party by his 'brother' and 'father', which moves him deeply. When Kam contacts Jing and asks him to target Kit again, he refuses. Fung overhears the conversation and seeks out the Trick Expert who is actually Jing's true identity. She insists that he target Kam to avenge Kit, and promises that she would marry him in return. Jing and Fung go to meet Kit and his father and tell them the truth. They are furious at first, but eventually accept Jing's help.

Jing takes Yan to his office to discuss plans, but they are confronted by a man who claims himself to be the Ultimate Trick Expert. He is hired by Kam to guard his party where he would propose to Ching. Kit, Jing and Yan infiltrate the party and search for Lucy. They manage to have Kit propose to Ching before Kam's men find and pursue them. Jing has an intense showdown with the Ultimate Trick Expert using tricks and comes out victorious by blowing him away with a paint bazooka. Meanwhile, Kit is seized and forced to drink a whole bottle of 'irresistible aphrodisiac'; however, the drug had expired and causes him to become incredibly strong and muscular instead. He easily subdues Kam and his men, then proceeds to ask Ching's father for permission to marry her, which he readily agrees.

As Jing and Yan happily watch the scene of Kit and Ching kissing, Fung approaches Jing and reminds him of their promise. Jing takes Fung to his mother, who was waiting outside, but Yan recognises her as Man-yuk, a woman with whom he had a one-night stand many years ago. The last plot twist is revealed that Jing is, in fact Yan's son and Kit's brother, before the credits roll.

== Cast ==
- Stephen Chow as Jing Koo / Man-yuk (Jing Koo's mother)
- Andy Lau as Che Man-kit
- Rosamund Kwan as Lucy Ching
- Chingmy Yau as Banana Fung
- Ng Man-tat as Yan Che
- Waise Lee as Macky Kam
- Wong Jing as Chiu
- Charlie Cho as Single Eyes
- Dion Lam as Ultimate Trick Expert's thug
- Shing Fui-On as Mr. Chu
- Yu Mo-lin as Mrs. Chu
- Pau Hon-lam as Mr. Ching
- John Ching as Ultimate Trick Expert
- Lo Fun as Sharky
- Mannor Chan as Yan Che's ex-lover
- Charlie Cho Cha-Lee – Single Eyes
- Jo Jo Ngan Lai-Yue – Banana's hired whore
- Benz Kong To-Hoi – Mr Kut Chun
- Bill Lung Biu – Bald disco rascal
- Ng Kwok-Kin – Police officer

== See also ==
- The Tricky Master, another film directed by Wong Jing centering around trickery
