= On His Majesty's Secret Service =

2009 Hong Kong film by Wong Jing

Chinese name
- Traditional Chinese: 大內密探靈靈狗
- Simplified Chinese: 大内密探灵灵狗
Transcriptions
Standard Mandarin
- Hanyu Pinyin: à Nèi Mì Tàn Líng Líng Gǒu
Yue: Cantonese
- Jyutping: Daai6 Noi6 Mat6 Taam3 Ling4 Ling4 Gau2
- Directed by: Wong Jing
- Written by: Wong Jing
- Produced by: Wong Jing; Han Xiaoli; Jiang Tao; Liu Xiaolin
- Starring: Louis Koo; Barbie Hsu; David Tong; Song Jia; Liu Yang; Louis Fan; Lam Chi-chung; Sandra Ng
- Cinematography: Venus Keung; Ng King Man; Chan Wai Lun
- Edited by: Li Kar Wing
- Music by: Lincoln Lo
- Production companies: Mega-Vision Pictures; China Film Group Corporation; Scholar Films; Beijing Ciwen Digital Oriental Film & TV Production; Beijing Hualu Baina Film & TV Production; Beijing Joy Pictures
- Distributed by: Mega-Vision Pictures
- Release date: 6 August 2009
- Running time: 98 minutes
- Country: Hong Kong
- Language: Cantonese
- Box office: ¥103 million

On His Majesty's Secret Service (simplified Chinese: 大内密探灵灵狗; traditional Chinese: 大內密探靈靈狗; pinyin: Dà Nèi Mì Tàn Líng Líng Gǒu; Jyutping: Daai6 Noi6 Mat6 Taam3 Ling4 Ling4 Gau2) is a 2009 Hong Kong comedy film, written, produced and directed by Wong Jing. The Chinese title (literal translation: "Imperial Secret Agent: Smart Dog") is a parody of the title of the 1996 film Forbidden City Cop (literal translation: "Imperial Secret Agent 008") which starred Stephen Chow and was also produced by Wong, while the English title is a parody of the title of the James Bond film On Her Majesty's Secret Service.

== Cast ==
- Louis Koo as Royal Dog
- Barbie Hsu as Hopeful
- Sandra Ng as Empress
- Louis Fan as Lord Unicorn
- Lam Chi-chung as Royal Pig
- Law Kar-ying as Marco Solo
- Lee Kin-yan as Lady in waiting
- Lee Man-kwan as Palace Maid
- Bryan Leung as Clement
- Liu Yang as Gemini
- Liu Yiwei as Emperor
- Natalie Meng Yao as Head Palace Maid
- Song Jia as Princess Rainbow
- Tong Dawei as Royal Tiger
- Kingdom Yuen as Clementine
