= Boys Are Easy =

1993 Hong Kong film by Wong Jing

- DVD cover
- Traditional Chinese: 追男仔
- Simplified Chinese: 追男仔
- Hanyu Pinyin: zhuī nán zǐ
- Jyutping: zeoi1 naam4 zai2
- Directed by: Wong Jing
- Written by: Wong Jing
- Produced by: Jessica Hsu Pei-Yong; Wong Jing
- Starring: Brigitte Lin; Maggie Cheung; Chingmy Yau; Tony Leung Ka-fai; Jacky Cheung; Ekin Cheng; Jimmy Lin; Richard Ng
- Cinematography: Jingle Ma
- Edited by: Poon Hung Yiu
- Music by: Lowell Lo
- Production companies: Chang Hong Channel Film & Video; Wong Jing's Workshop Ltd.
- Distributed by: Regal Films Distribution
- Release date: 12 August 1993 (Hong Kong)
- Running time: 90 minutes
- Country: Hong Kong
- Language: Cantonese
- Box office: HK$11,860,869

Boys Are Easy (Chinese: 追男仔; pinyin: zhuī nán zǐ) also known as Chasing Boys is a 1993 Hong Kong romantic comedy film directed by Wong Jing. It stars Brigitte Lin, Maggie Cheung, Chingmy Yau, Tony Leung Ka-fai, Jacky Cheung, Ekin Cheng, and Jimmy Lin. The film ran in theaters from 12 August 1993 until 1 September 1993. The film is separated into 3 different stories, a male prostitute falling in love with a violent police officer; a kind social worker falling in love with a gangster; a naive virgin falling in love with a doctor.

== Plot ==
Ching Sing (Richard Ng) is a hardworking father. His wife died when their children were young so he spent most of his life taking care of his children. He has three daughters, Ching Siu Tung (Brigitte Lin), Ching Siu Nam (Maggie Cheung), Ching Siu Sze (Chingmy Yau) and a son, Ching Siu Pei (Jimmy Lin). Ching Sing wants his daughters to get married, so he fakes a terminal illness and forces them to get creative about their romantic relationships, asking to see their boyfriends over dinner.

Siu Tung, who is a police officer, meets a male prostitute called Simon Tse Sai (Tony Leung Ka-fai). She offers him money to be her boyfriend for one day to lie to her father. Simon accidentally falls in love with Siu Tung and tries everything to make her fall in love with him. After failing and embarrassing himself multiple times, Siu Tung finally falls in love with Simon. Siu Nam is a social worker. She meets a poor gangster called Wu Ying (Jacky Cheung) and decides to help his family, but instead tries to join the underworld to impress him. Because of this, Wu Ying decides to leave the underworld and start a brand new life with her. Siu Sze, who is a doctor, meets 27-year-old virgin named Lee Chi Ko (Ekin Cheng) through one of her female patients. Having been told that Chi Ko has been set up many times with different girls due to his fear of sex, Siu Sze pranks him by tempting him to have sex, but it fails. Siu Sze realizes that he cares about her a lot and they fall in love with each other.

Over dinner having met all of the boyfriends, Ching Sing reveals that his long time pen pal Chi Sum Chan (Sandra Ng) is coming to Hong Kong. Only after a few days, they already start to hate her because of her obvious schemes to steal their father's money. Gangsters break in to their house to try and murder Siu Tung but when they fail, they kidnap and leave with Sum Chan, not realizing that it only makes the family happy.

== Cast ==
- Brigitte Lin as Ching Siu Tung - Ching Sing's daughter, falls in love with Simon, policewoman
- Maggie Cheung as Ching Siu Nam - Ching Sing's daughter, falls in love with Wu Ying, social worker
- Chingmy Yau as Ching Siu Sze - Ching Sing's daughter, falls in kive Chi Ko, doctor
- Tony Leung Ka-fai as Simon Tse Sai - Falls in love with Siu Tung, male prostitute
- Jacky Cheung as Wu Ying - Falls in love with Siu Nam, gangster
- Ekin Cheng as Lee Chi Ko - Falls in love with Siu Sze, naive, rich, 27 year old virgin
- Richard Ng as Ching Sing - Father of Siu Tung, Siu Nam, Siu Sze and Siu Pei
- Jimmy Lin as Ching Siu Pei - Ching Sing's son
- Sandra Ng as Chi Sam - Gets kidnapped at the end of the movie
- Ken Lo as Wild Dog - Gangster
- Helena Law Lan as Mrs Wu - Wu Ying's mother
- Wu Fung as Uncle Sai - Siu Tung, Siu Nam, Siu Sze and Siu Pei's uncle
- Pak Yan as Miss Lee - Chi Ko's mother
- Ronald Wong Ban as Chicken
- Lee Siu-kei as Policeman at police station
- Fei Pak as Policeman
- Wong Yat-fei as Hypnotist
- Lee Ka-Ting as Bastard Ting
- Wong Hung as Manager of gigolo club
- Ray Pang as Wild Dog's thug
- Wu Zhan-Peng as Wild Dog's thug
- Kong Miu-Deng as Wild Dog's thug
- Ching Kwok-Leung as Wild Dog's thug
- Go Shut-Fung as Wild Dog's thug
- Chan Ging-Chi as Wild Dog's thug

== Critical response ==
On IMDb, it received an average rating of 6.5 out of 10 based on 234 reviews.

On the Chinese movie review website, Douban, it received an average rating of 7.2 out of 10 based on 10435 user reviews.
