= How to Pick Girls Up! =

1988 Hong Kong film by Wong Jing

How to Pick Girls Up! 求愛敢死隊
- Film poster
- Directed by: Wong Jing
- Written by: Wong Jing
- Produced by: Louis Lau Tin Chi
- Starring: Eric Tsang; Stanley Fung; Wilson Lam; Wong Jing; Maggie Cheung; Sandra Ng; Elizabeth Lee; Ellen Chan; Charlie Cho
- Cinematography: Lee San Yip
- Edited by: Chiang Hsing Lung
- Music by: Sherman Chow Gam Cheung; Lai Hok Ban
- Production companies: Cosmopolitan Film Productions Co. Shaw Brothers
- Release date: 18 July 1988
- Running time: 91 minutes
- Country: Hong Kong
- Language: Cantonese
- Box office: HK$12.78 million

How to Pick Girls Up! (Chinese: 求愛敢死隊) is a 1988 Hong Kong comedy film directed by Wong Jing.

== Cast and roles ==
- Eric Tsang as Tan Yu-lun. a Dj
- Stanley Fung as Fei Chang-fan
- Wilson Lam Chun Yi as He Ma-tong
- Wong Jing as Xin Jie-jing
- Maggie Cheung as Fanny
- Elizabeth Lee as Li Chu Hong
- Sandra Ng as Mei You-kong
- Chingmy Yau as Xiao Bei-bei
- Ellen Chan as Yuki
- Charlie Cho as Councillor Cao Zhu Li
- Au-Yeung Wai Laan
- Cheung Gwok Wa
- Kathy Chow Ho Mei as Didi
- Chow Kong
- Ding Yue
- Shirley Gwan Suet Lai
- Ho Pak Kwong
- Titus Ho Wing Lam
- Jeffrey Hoh Wai Lung as Lai Pi
- Hui Ying Sau as Uncle Lai
- Lai Siu Fong
- Law Ching Ho as Ah Wan
- Lee Chung Ling as Xiang
- Leung Hak Shun
- Margie Tsang as Jenny
- Wong Hung
