= Casino Tycoon (film) =

1992 Hong Kong film by Wong Jing

- Film poster

Chinese name
- Traditional Chinese: 賭城大亨之新哥傳奇
- Simplified Chinese: 赌城大亨之新哥传奇
Transcriptions
Standard Mandarin
- Hanyu Pinyin: Dǔ Chéng Dà Hēng Zhī Xīn Gē Chuán Qí
Yue: Cantonese
- Jyutping: Dou2 Sing4 Daai6 Hang1 Zi1 San1 Go1 Zyun6 Kei4
- Directed by: Wong Jing
- Written by: Wong Jing
- Produced by: Wong Jing
- Starring: Andy Lau; Joey Wong; Chingmy Yau
- Cinematography: Gigo Lee
- Edited by: Wong Wing-ming
- Music by: Lowell Lo
- Distributed by: Newport Entertainment Ltd.
- Release date: 20 February 1992
- Running time: 133 minutes
- Country: Hong Kong
- Language: Cantonese
- Box office: HK$28,611,389

Casino Tycoon (Chinese: 賭城大亨之新哥傳奇) is a 1992 Hong Kong action drama film written, produced and directed by Wong Jing starring Andy Lau, Joey Wong and Chingmy Yau. The film is inspired by stories of Stanley Ho, Henry Fok and Yip Hon. It was followed by the sequel Casino Tycoon 2, which was released the same year.

== Summary ==
Set in World War II, Casino Tycoon chronicles the story of Benny, a young graduate played by Andy Lau, who flees Hong-Kong during the Japanese invasion and heads for gambling haven Macau. Once in Macau, he starts as a lowly coolie but he impresses a local business man who has ties to organised crime, and slowly builds his way up the ranks. Benny engages in a battle of wits against his college rival and business enemies. In the finale, Benny overcomes his enemies but at great personal cost.

== Cast and roles ==
- Andy Lau as Benny Ho San (based on Stanley Ho)
- Joey Wong as Vivian Ching Lok-yee
- Chingmy Yau as Mui (based on Clementina Leitao)
- Alex Man as Kwok Ying-nam (based on Henry Fok)
- Wilson Lam as Fu Ka-chun
- Paul Chun as Wong Cheung
- Kwan Hoi-san as Fu Lo-cha
- Lau Siu-ming as Nip Ngo-tin
- Paw Hee-ching as Benny's mother
- Wong Yat-fei as Dentist Tsang Chi-wai
- Maria Tung Ling as Lucida, half sister of Mui
- Chin Tsi-ang
