= Casino Tycoon 2 =

1992 Hong Kong film by Wong Jing

- Film poster

Chinese name
- Traditional Chinese: 賭城大亨II之至尊無敵
- Simplified Chinese: 赌城大亨II之至尊无敌
Transcriptions
Standard Mandarin
- Hanyu Pinyin: Dǔ Chéng Dà Hēng Èr Zhī Zhì Zūn Wú Dí
Yue: Cantonese
- Jyutping: Dou2 Sing4 Daai6 Hang1 Ji6 Zi1 Zi3 Zyun1 Mou4 Dik6
- Directed by: Wong Jing
- Written by: Wong Jing
- Produced by: Wong Jing
- Starring: Andy Lau; Chingmy Yau
- Cinematography: Gigo Lee
- Edited by: Wong Wing-ming
- Music by: Lowell Lo; Lee Yiu-tung; Sherman Chow
- Distributed by: Newport Entertainment Ltd.
- Release date: 20 August 1992
- Running time: 114 minutes
- Country: Hong Kong
- Language: Cantonese
- Box office: HK$10,479,148

Casino Tycoon 2 (Chinese: 賭城大亨II之至尊無敵) is a 1992 Hong Kong action drama film written, produced and directed by Wong Jing and starring Andy Lau and Chingmy Yau. It is the sequel to Casino Tycoon.

== Summary ==
Andy Lau returns in his role as the Casino Tycoon of Macau, Benny Ho. We join Ho 18 years after the last film as he has established his casino empire in Macau and is living with his daughter and wife. When his daughter brings home a young man eager to make headway in his casino empire, Ho becomes embroiled in a plot to destroy his family.

== Cast ==
- Andy Lau as Benny Ho (based on Stanley Ho)
- Chingmy Yau as Mui
- Joey Wong as Vivian Ching (guest star)
- Alex Man as Kwok Ying-nam (guest star; based on Henry Fok)
- Michelle Reis as Tik Wan (guest star)
- Remos Choi as Ching Chan
- Vivian Chan as Ho Tin-yee
- Lau Siu-ming as Nip Ngo-tin
- Benz Hui as Ko Ming
- Sandra Ng as Chu Lam-lam (cameo; based on Loletta Chu)
- Calvin Choi as Ho Tin-po (cameo)
- Edmond So as Ting (cameo; based on Timothy Fok)
- Newton Lai as Tik Wan's boyfriend (based on Patrick Tse)
- John Ching as Niu Pit
- Lee Siu-kei as Ho Piu
- Kingdom Yuen as Sin
- Dennis Chan as Master Ho
