= Wong Jing =

Hong Kong filmmaker and actor (born 1955)

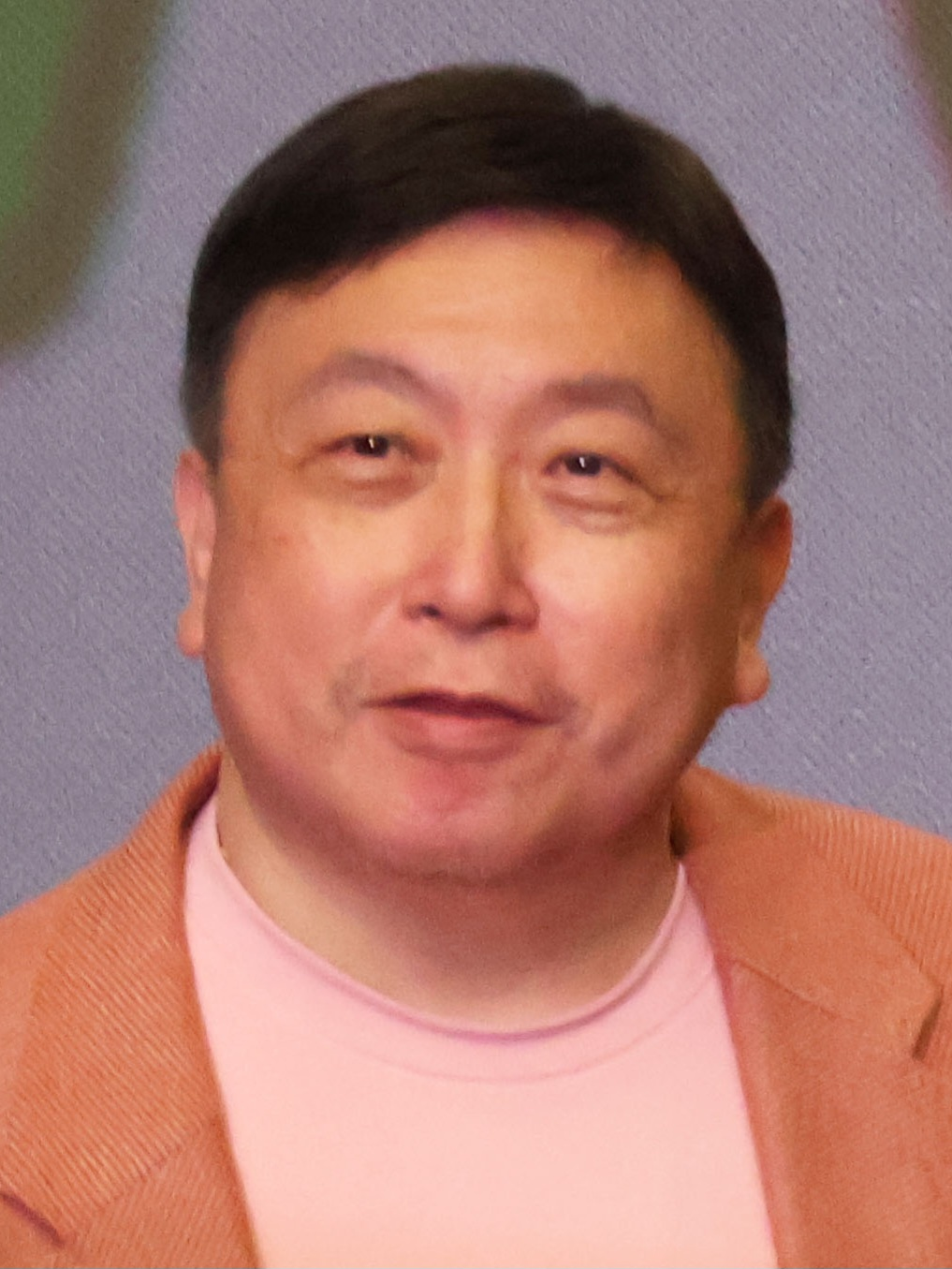
- Wong in 2025
- Born: Wong Yat Cheong (王日祥); 3 May 1955 (age 71); British Hong Kong
- Occupations: Film director; actor; screenwriter; film producer
- Parent: Wong Tin-Lam (1928–2010)
- Awards: Hong Kong Film Critics Society Awards – Best Screenplay; 2006 Colour of the Loyalty; 2007 Crouching Tiger

Chinese name
Transcriptions
Standard Mandarin
- Hanyu Pinyin: Wáng Jīng
Yue: Cantonese
- Jyutping: Wong4 Zing1

Wong Yat-cheong, known professionally as Wong Jing (Chinese: 王晶, born 3 May 1955), is a Hong Kong filmmaker and actor. A prolific filmmaker with strong instincts for crowd-pleasing and publicity, he played a prominent role in Hong Kong cinema during the 1990s.

== Biography ==
Wong was born in Hong Kong, the son of noted film director Wong Tin-Lam. He graduated from the Chinese University of Hong Kong with a degree in Chinese literature which he describes as "useless" (Yang, 2003).

Like many Hong Kong film figures of his time, Wong began his career in television – in his case, scriptwriting for local juggernaut TVB beginning in 1975 (Teo, 1997). He moved on to writing for the Shaw Brothers studio. There, he made his directing debut with Challenge of the Gamesters (千王鬥千霸) in 1981. This start foreshadowed his later successes with movies about gambling, such as God of Gamblers, starring Chow Yun-fat and Andy Lau, which broke Hong Kong's all-time box office record upon its release in 1989, and started a fad for the genre.

Wong has directed, produced or written over 175 films (Yang, 2003), occasionally acting in them as well. He works with an efficient mass production method making heavy use of directing assistants and allowing him to work on several movies at once. He works under the umbrellas of two production companies he launched, Wong Jing's Workshop Ltd. and BoB and Partners Co. Ltd. (Best of the Best), the latter in partnership with director Andrew Lau and writer-producer Manfred Wong (Bordwell, 2000).

He once commented that his movies were hits because he gave the people what they wanted, and not what he thought they should want. A typical Wong production might be a broad comedy (Boys Are Easy, 1993) or an entry in a currently popular genre, such as martial arts (Holy Weapon, 1993), erotic thriller (Naked Killer, 1992) or gangster film (Young and Dangerous, 1996). It will imbue its model with lightning pacing and frequent shifts in tone to accommodate slapstick and toilet humor, sentimental heart-tugging, cartoonish violence, sexual titillation, and parodic references to well-known Hong Kong and Hollywood films.

Wong also directed or produced several of the films of comic actor Stephen Chow, who has been Hong Kong's most popular performer since the early 1990s. Examples of their collaborations include God of Gamblers II (1991), Tricky Brains (1991), Royal Tramp I and II (1992) and Sixty Million Dollar Man (1995).

Wong's commercial skills are not limited to the content of his movies or his casting. He was using Hollywood-style cross-media promotional tactics – such as tie-in novels, comic books and other products, and magazine interviews – long before they became common in Hong Kong (Bordwell, 2000).

Wong's style, often seen as loud, crass and philistine, may be another factor in his low stock among critics. According to director Ann Hui, he remarked of Hui's acclaimed 1990 drama Song of the Exile, "Who wants to watch the autobiography of a fat woman?" In 1994, unidentified assailants attacked him outside his offices and knocked out his teeth; this was widely believed to have been retaliation for injudicious remarks, ordered by Triads or Chinese organized crime figures, whose involvement in the industry is notorious, although Wong himself is rumored to be involved with the Triads.

In the late 1990s and 2000s, Wong's films fared much worse in the box office compared to his earlier output due to the sluggish recession which had enveloped Hong Kong cinema in the new millennium. However a number of his films released in the 2010s, such as From Vegas to Macau, saw renewed success for the director, particularly in mainland China.

== Filmography ==
- Wits of the Brats (1984)
- The Magic Crystal (1986)
- The Romancing Star (1987)
- The Romancing Star II (1988)
- The Crazy Companies (1988)
- How to Pick Girls Up! (1988)
- The Crazy Companies II (1988)
- Casino Raiders (1989)
- Crocodile Hunter (1989)
- God of Gamblers (1989)
- God of Gamblers II (1990)
- Tricky Brains (1991)
- The Last Blood (1991)
- God of Gamblers III: Back to Shanghai (1991)
- Dances with Dragon (1991)
- Casino Tycoon (1992)
- Royal Tramp (1992)
- Casino Tycoon 2 (1992)
- Royal Tramp II (1992)
- Fight Back to School III (1993)
- City Hunter (1993)
- Legend of the Liquid Sword (1993)
- Last Hero in China (1993)
- Holy Weapon (1993)
- Future Cops (1993)
- Boys Are Easy (1993)
- Perfect Exchange (1993)
- Kung Fu Cult Master (1993)
- The New Legend of Shaolin (1994)
- Hail the Judge (1994)
- Return to a Better Tomorrow (1994)
- God of Gamblers Returns (1994)
- The Saint of Gamblers (1995)
- High Risk (1995)
- God of Gamblers 3: The Early Stage (1997)
- We're No Bad Guys (1997)
- A True Mob Story (1998)
- The Conman (1998)
- Prince Charming (1999)
- The Conmen in Vegas (1999)
- The Tricky Master (1999)
- Love Me, Love My Money (2001)
- The Spy Dad (2003)
- Moving Targets (2004)
- Love Is a Many Stupid Thing (2004)
- Kung Fu Mahjong (2005)
- Kung Fu Mahjong 2 (2005)
- My Kung-Fu Sweetheart (2006)
- My Wife Is a Gambling Maestro (2008)
- I Corrupt All Cops (2009)
- On His Majesty's Secret Service (2009)
- To Live and Die in Mongkok (2009)
- Black Ransom (2010)
- Future X-Cops (2010)
- Men Suddenly in Love (2011)
- Treasure Inn (2011)
- Hong Kong Ghost Stories (2011)
- Mr. and Mrs. Gambler (2012)
- Marrying Mr. Perfect (2012)
- The Last Tycoon (2012)
- Princess and the Seven Kung Fu Masters (2013)
- From Vegas to Macau (2014)
- From Vegas to Macau II (2015)
- From Vegas to Macau III (2016)
- Mission Milano (2016)
- Chasing the Dragon (2017)
- Chasing the Dragon II: Wild Wild Bunch (2019)
- Enter the Fat Dragon (2020)
- Once Upon a Time in Hong Kong (2021)
- New Kung Fu Cult Master 1 (2022)
- New Kung Fu Cult Master 2 (2022)
