= The Victim (1980 film) =

1980 Hong Kong film by Sammo Hung

- Film poster

Chinese name
- Traditional Chinese: 身不由己
- Simplified Chinese: 身不由己
Transcriptions
Standard Mandarin
- Hanyu Pinyin: Shēn Bù Yóu Jǐ
Yue: Cantonese
- Jyutping: San1 Bat1 Jau4 Gei2
- Directed by: Sammo Hung
- Written by: Lau Tin-chi
- Produced by: Karl Maka
- Starring: Sammo Hung; Bryan Leung
- Cinematography: Ma Koon-wa
- Music by: Frankie Chan
- Production company: Graffon Film
- Release date: 28 February 1980
- Running time: 100 minutes
- Country: Hong Kong
- Language: Cantonese
- Box office: HK$1,668,661.50

The Victim (Chinese: 身不由已) is a 1980 Hong Kong martial arts comedy film starring and directed by Sammo Hung. It was released in the US as Lightning Kung Fu in June 1982.

The film focuses on the hostile relationship between two adoptive brothers, and one brother's obsessive pursuit of his sister-in-law.

== Plot ==
Chun-yau (Bryan Leung) was adopted as a little orphan boy by a humble rich man under one rainy-night who already had a mean young son. Chun-yau has developed into a fine kung fu fighter who is on the run with his newly-wedded wife Yuet-yee (Fanny Wang) from his adoptive brother Cho-wing (Chang Yi), who is madly in love with his sister-in-law. The jealous son holds a grudge against his adoptive brother because he blames Chun-yau for the loss of his eye (and now wears a jade patch over the eye). Now, Cho-wing has made it his goal to hunt down Chun-yau and his bride, prompting the newlyweds to spend their lives together running in fear from the gang leader.

One fine day, Fatty (Sammo Hung) spots Chun-yau helping an old man from being crushed by a loaded-cart. Fatty challenges Chun-yau but is ultimately defeated. However, Chun-yau is not interested in becoming Fatty's master since he is more worried about his own domestic problems. Apparently Fatty has promised his ancestors that he shall learn proper kung fu by training under the man who beats him (and Chun-yau is the first to do so). However, Chun-yau and his wife are trying to keep a low profile and they want nothing to do with Fatty, as all he does is attract attention. Fatty, meanwhile, can't help but wonder why such a great martial artist lives in fear.

With his stepfather at death's door, Chun-yau and his wife go to pay final respects to his ill-struck adopted father. As Chun-yau enters his father's room, he finds himself surrounded by Cho-wing's men. They let Chun-yau speak with his stepfather as the old one expires. Cho-wing appears to be mourning the death of his father, but as soon as Chun-yau leaves his stepfather's room, Cho-wing orders his men to attack his stepbrother. Fatty arrives in time to help Chun-yau fight off the gang members. But Chun-yau's wife can no longer handle the pressures of life on the run and she begs Cho-wing to stop the violence and she will leave Chun-yau and live with him. Afterwards, she tells her husband she is sick of life on the run and that she will stay with Cho-wing. Chun-yau is shattered and leaves a broken man, followed by the faithful Fatty. But Yuet-yee really does not plan on spending her life with her hated admirer. After Cho-wing calls off the price on Chun-yau's head, Yuet-yee commits suicide rather than succumbing to his desires. After stealing the body of his wife and laying her to rest, Chun-yau finally begins training Fatty in the kung fu style his step father taught him, "The Iron Cross". During a training session, Fatty spots a gang member watching them from some tall grass so he tells his sifu and gets a knife to dispatch him. But to Chun-yau's surprise, Fatty stabs him instead, telling him that "He was a victim too".

Later, after the gang member reports back, Fatty goes and collects the bounty on Chun-yau from Cho-wing, who is also holding Fatty's mother hostage. With money and mother in hand, Fatty has one more gift for Cho-winfi, which is Chun-yau, whom very much alive. He explains that once Chun-yau became his sifu, he told him everything. They came up with the plan to stage his death and getting Fatty's mother released. But as Fatty and his mother were leaving, gang members stabbed them both. Fatty's last words to his teacher and friend was to put his loyalty to his step father aside and avenge them. A final battle ensues between a hired expert in the Southern Eagle Claw and Chun-yau. After Chun-yau dispatches the hired expert and gives the gang members a good beating, they got the message and left the two brothers to handle their own business. The two brothers are evenly matched in fighting style till Chun-yau finally lets go of his rage and turns the kung fu match into a street fight leaving Cho-wing dead from being hurled into a building support column.

Afterwards, Chun-yau paying respects at the graves of his wife and student. While there, a beggar looking a lot like Fatty shows up and asked about the deceased and their relations to him. As the beggar turns to leave, Chun-Yau realises who he is and runs after him.

== Cast ==
- Sammo Hung as Fatty Chan Wing
- Bryan Leung as Leung Chun-yau
- Chang Yi as Cho-wing
- Fanny Wang as Yuet-yee
- Peter Chan as Yuet-ming
- Wilson Tong as Tong
- Karl Maka as Shaolin Abbott Silver Lining
- Chung Fat as Choi Fan-tan
- Lay Kah as Henchman
- Lau Chau-sang as Henchman
- Lam Ching-ying as Cho-wing's cohort
- Yuen Biao as Cho-wing's cohort
- Billy Chan as Chun-yau's friend
- Johnny Cheung as Cho-wing's man
- Chow Kam-kong as Henchman
- Shum Wai
- David Wu
- Dick Wei
- Huang Ha
- Wu Yuen

== Production ==
Although he had only a very small role in The Victim, former China Drama Academy student Yuen Biao played a key part in the making of this film. He was one of four action choreographers on the film, and doubled several of the stars for martial arts and acrobatics.

Karl Maka, a frequent co-star with Hung in such films as Skinny Tiger, Fatty Dragon and Odd Couple, has an unusual deadpan role as a Shaolin abbot.
