= Chung Fat =

Hong Kong actor

- Born: December 2, 1953 (age 72); Guangdong, China
- Years active: 1973–present

Chung Fat is a Hong Kong–based actor, choreographer, producer, and director. He primarily stars in jiangshi fictions and martial art movies.

== Early life ==
Chung was born on 2 December 1953. He is a native of Guangdong province and of Han ethnicity. As a teenager, he was a Northern Praying Mantis practitioner with Lam Ching-ying, under the guidance of Madame Fan Fok-fa. He became proficient in the use of a great variety of martial arts weapons and techniques.

He was trained by Madame Fan Kuk-fa of The Spring and Autumn Drama School.

== Performing experience ==
Chung Fat had his debut in Enter the Dragon (1973), in a small role as a security guard who fails to capture Bruce Lee. In over thirty years in the movie business, Chung only had three protagonist roles in his career, instead often being cast in supporting, secondary or mainly villain roles. He has also worked as a director, choreographer, and planner. He had a long-term collaboration with Jackie Chan and Sammo Hung.

By the 21st century his film appearances had mostly faded out, though he continued to appear in commercials. However, in 2013 he returned to the silver screen in Juno Mak's jiangshi film Rigor Mortis.

== Selected filmography ==
- Chinese Hercules (1973)
- Enter the Dragon (US, 1973) as Han traitor (uncredited)
- Tie han rou qing (1974)
- Yi shan wu hu (1974)
- The Tournament (1974)
- The Shaolin Plot (1977)
- The Iron-Fisted Monk (1977) as Shu-Liu Worker
- Last Strike (1977)
- He Has Nothing But Kung Fu (1977) as Wang's man
- Bruce Li - The Invincible (1978, cameo)
- Enter the Fat Dragon (1978, cameo) as Fighter in Opening Credit Sequence
- Bian fu chuan qi (1978)
- Shui yue men (1978)
- The Game of Death (1978) as Dr. Land's henchmen
- Warriors Two (1978) as Tramp
- Dirty Tiger, Crazy Frog (1978) as Chicken's Brother #1
- The Incredible Kung Fu Master (1979) as Little Dog
- Da chu tou (1979)
- Knockabout (1979) as Vegetable hawker / Big Eyes
- Lao shu la gui (1979)
- Odd Couple (1979, cameo) as Ti
- His Name is Nobody (1979) as Ping the Dreg
- Crazy Partner (1979)
- The Magnificent Butcher (1979) as Wildcat
- Way of the Black Dragon (1979)
- Death Duel of Kung Fu (1979)
- The Victim (1980, cameo) as Choy Fan-Tan
- By Hook or by Crook (1980) as Chung Fa-Pai / Golden Killer
- Two Toothless Tigers (1980)
- Encounters of the Spooky Kind (1980) as Priest Tsui
- Two Fists Against the Law (1980)
- The Phantom Killer (1981)
- The Prodigal Son (1981) as Mr Law
- To Hell with the Devil (1982, cameo) as The Devil
- The Dead and the Deadly (1982) as The Priest
- Zu Warriors from the Magic Mountain (1983) as Blue Commander
- The Trail (1983, also action) as Flint
- Winners and Sinners (1983) as Tar's Top Henchman
- Pom Pom (1984) as Columbo
- The Return of Pom Pom (1984) as Sherlock Holmes
- Mr. Boo Meets Pom Pom (1985)
- Those Merry Souls (1985) as Messenger of Death
- Twinkle Twinkle Lucky Stars (1985) as Moustached Assassin
- Heart of Dragon (1985) as Moose / Cho Yee Fat
- Yes, Madam (1985) as Mad-dog
- The Millionaire's Express (1986) as Mountain Bandit
- New Mr. Vampire (1986) as Master Chin
- Rosa (1986) as Assassin
- Mr. Vampire II (1986) as Professor Kwok
- Magic Crystal (1986) as Triad Boss' Thug
- Righting Wrongs (1986, cameo) as Red Porsche Cop
- Eastern Condors (1987) as Col Young's commando #3
- The Haunted Cop Shop (1987) as Chung Fat Pak
- Shy Spirit (1988) as Wang
- Dragons Forever (1988) as Ship Thug (uncredited)
- Chaos by Design (1988)
- Miss Magic (1988) as Uncle Fok
- Three Against the World (1988) as Gambler on train
- Spooky, Spooky (1988) as Chen Ta-Wen / Queency
- 18 Times (1988)
- Geung see suk suk (1988) as Taoist Crane
- Pedicab Driver (1989) as Thug
- The Blonde Fury (1989) as Break-and-Enter Thief
- Ghost Busting (1989) as Master Cheung Kwok Wing
- Fu gui bing tuan (1990) as Japanese Officer
- The Spooky Family (1990) as Wizard
- Stage Door Johnny (1990)
- She Shoots Straight (1990) as Hua, the Boss
- My Neighbours are Phantoms (1990) as George Chan
- The Revenge of Angel (1990) as Chan Ping
- Pantyhose Hero (1990) as Chainsaw Robber
- Mortuary Blues (1990)
- The Gambling Ghost (1991) as Leung's Partner in Flashback
- Bo Hao (1991) as Cham
- Spiritual Trinity (1991) as Wizard
- Nu gui sheng si lian (1991) as Wu Tien
- Liu Jai Home for the Intimate Ghosts (1991) as High Priest
- Ghost Killer (1992)
- Cai guo jie huang jin bu dui (1992)
- Pretty Ghostress Story (1992)
- Beauty Investigator (1992) as Chung Fat
- Du ming xi yang (1992)
- Behind the Curtain (1992)
- Shadow Cop (1993) as Fat
- Last Hero in China (1993) as Yuen Long
- Crime Story (1993) as Ng Kwok-Wah / Wu Kuo Hua
- The 13 Cold-Blooded Eagles (1993) as Xingshu Laoying
- Xue qiang lei ying (1993)
- Miao jie shi san mei (1993) as Wang Pan
- Ghost's Love (1993) as Ng
- Deadful Melody (1994) as Hon Suen
- The Lady Punisher (1994)
- The Hunted Hunter (1997)
- Leopard Hunting (1998) as Chong
- Faces of Horror (1998)
- Lang dao jiang hu (1999)
- White Storm (2000, producer)
- Sworn Revenge (2000, producer)
- Bloody Secret (2000, producer)
- Nothing is Impossible (2006)
- Rigor Mortis (2013) as Gau
