= Cheung Wing-fat =

Hong Kong actor, action director, stuntman and martial artist

- 蔣榮發
- Born: 28 February 1954 (age 72); British Hong Kong
- Other name: Mars
- Occupations: Actor; action director; stuntman; producer; martial artist
- Years active: 1966–present

Chinese name
- Traditional Chinese: 蔣榮發
- Simplified Chinese: 蒋荣发
Transcriptions
Standard Mandarin
- Hanyu Pinyin: Jiǎng róng fā

Mars
- Chinese: 火星
Transcriptions
Standard Mandarin
- Hanyu Pinyin: Huò Xīn
Yue: Cantonese
- Jyutping: Fo2 Sing1

Cheung Wing-fat (simplified Chinese: 蒋荣发; traditional Chinese: 蔣榮發; pinyin: Jiǎng róng fā), also known as Mars (Chinese: 火星), is a Hong Kong actor, action director, stuntman and martial artist. He is one of Jackie Chan's best friends.

== Early life ==
Cheung Wing-fat was born in Hong Kong in 1954. He got the nickname "Weird Fire Star" after being involved in a car accident leaving him with two scars on his head. While working as a stuntman on a film in Thailand he got promoted to a supporting actor and needed a stage name. He picked "Mars" based on his nickname. He became a student of Madame Fan Fok-fa in The Spring and Autumn Drama School. He practiced every day from 5am to 9pm.

== Film career ==
Mars started acting in 1966 at the age of 12. He started out as an extra and later in supporting roles. Lackey and the Lady Tiger (1980) is only the film in which he played the leading role.

In 1971, Mars got his nickname "Mars" from a stunt co-ordinator who suggested it to him since his nickname on stage was Martian Monster, and he ended up with the name Mars after filming The Rescue.

In 1979, he joined the Jackie Chan Stunt Team and focused more on being a stuntman and action director rather than an actor. Being a very close friend of Chan, Mars has worked with Chan in numerous films starting with The Young Master (1980). He played a major supporting role in Chan's hit films, Project A, Project A II, Police Story and Police Story 2. Mars also had minor villain roles in Chan's other hit films, Crime Story, Drunken Master II and Thunderbolt. He also acted in many of Chan's other films and was also a stuntman in his films.

Ever since working in Jackie Chan's 1996 film Mr. Nice Guy, he has been using his real name instead. He had become a senior member in both Jackie Chan's and Sammo Hung's stunt team.

== Filmography ==
- Young and Furious (Part 1) (1966) - young child (uncredited)
- The Golden Cup, the Wandering Dragon and the Decree to Kill (1966) - young child
- The Monkey Goes West (1966) - Little Underwater Turtle Demon Child
- The Golden Cup and the Wandering Dragon (1966) - young child (extra)
- Come Drink with Me (1966) - one of the beggar children (uncredited)
- The One Armed-Swordsman (1967) - street kid that gets mask stolen
- Blue Skies (1967) - musical troupe dancing child (extra)
- Golden Swallow (1968) - Chang Shun's son
- The Rescue (1971) - Tartar soldier (extra)
- The Eunuch (1971) - soldier (extra) / (uncredited)
- Trilogy of Swordsmanship (1972) - Shi's soldier fellow (cameo)
- The Black Tavern (1972) - Officer Hai's servant
- The Casino (1972) - casino thug (extra) (uncredited) / stunts (uncredited)
- The Hurricane (1972) - Neng's thug / stunts
- The Brutal Boxer (1972) - Chin / stunts
- Tough Guy (1972) - extra (uncredited)
- Fist of Fury (1972) - Japanese Person (uncredited) / stunts
- Fist of Unicorn (1972) - Stuttering boy
- Back Alley Princess (1973) - extra (uncredited)
- Honor and Love (1973) - cameo
- Dynamite Brothers (1973) - Tuen's henchman in the final fight (uncredited) / stunts (uncredited)
- Fist to Fist (1973) - extra (uncredited)
- Enter the Dragon (1973) - Han traitor (uncredited) / stunts (uncredited)
- The Rendezvous of Warriors (1973) - extra (uncredited)
- The Awaken Punch (1973) - (uncredited)
- Little Tiger of Canton (1973) - cameo / stunts (as Fo Sing)
- The Bastard (1973) - Gu's thug (extra) / stunts
- The Rats (1973) - cameo
- Village on Fire (1973)
- The Young Tiger (1973) - Angry Thug in army pants (as Huo Hsing)
- Ambush (1973) - Lao Er of Ximen Tigers
- Village of Tigers (1974) - Ba clan member
- Virgins of the Seven Seas (1974) - Pirate killed on ship
- The Thunder Kick (1974) - (as Fo Sing)
- The Shaolin Boxer (1974) - Chuan's student
- Supermen Against the Orient (1974) - Thug (uncredited) / stunts
- Super Kung Fu Kid (1974) - cameo / stunts
- Village of Tigers (1974) - Hero Bao's Friend
- Bloody Ring (1974) - cameo
- The Mandarin Magician (1974) - (as Fo Sing)
- The Skyhawk (1974) - woodland attacker / stunts (as Fo Sing)
- The Bod Squad (1974) - (as Huo Shing)
- The Young Dragons (1974) - Lui Fu's thug / stunts
- Hong Kong Superman (1975) - extra(uncredited) / cameo / stunts
- The Valiant Ones (1975) - Japanese swordsman pirate
- The Golden Lion (1975) - Golden Lion gang member
- Bruce Lee and I (1976) - Little Boy
- Bruce Lee - True Story (1976) - Charlie
- The Private Eyes (1976) - robber (as Fo Sing)
- The Magic Blade (1976) - stunts
- Shaolin Plot (1977) - Monk (as Fo Sing)
- Last Strike (1977) - extra (uncredited)
- The Iron Fisted Monk (1977) - Shu-Liu worker
- Broken Oath (1977) - One of Chou's Guards
- Soul Brothers of Kung Fu (1977) - cameo
- The Pilferer's Progress (1977) - Hitman
- He Has Nothing But Kung Fu (1977)
- Strife for Mastery (1977) - cameo / stunts
- The Amsterdam Kill (1977) - cameo
- Enter the Fat Dragon (1978) - opening dream sequence fighter / stunts
- Strike and Sword (1978) - thug
- Bruce Li - The Invincible Chinatown Connection (1978) - teacher with mask
- Warriors Two (1978) - Thunder's men/Civilian (2 roles) / stunts
- The Legendary Strike (1978)
- Game of Death (1978) - Thug (extra) (uncredited) / stunts
- Iron Maiden - (as Fo Sing)
- Dirty Tiger, Crazy Frog (1978) - 3 Tricks Kid partner / Casino Fighter
- Naked Comes the Huntress (1978) - Monk
- Fists and Guts (1979) - extra (uncredited)
- Last Hurrah for Chivalry (1979) - Pak Chung Tong's man
- His Name Is Nobody (1979) - person in restaurant (cameo)
- The Challenger (1979) - Fair croupier (as Fo Sing)
- Odd Couple (1979) - Potato
- Crazy Couple (1979) - extra (uncredited) / stunts
- The Wickedness in Poverty (1979) - Toilet waste carrier (cameo)
- The Incredible Kung Fu Master (1979) - one of Yang Wei's men (cameo) / stunts
- Crazy Partner (1979) - cameo
- The Dragon, the Hero (1979) - Defeated Fighter (cameo) / stunts
- Knockabout (1979) - Tiger (as Fo Sing)
- Itchy Fingers (1979) - Mr Liu's thug / stunts (uncredited)
- Lackey and the Lady Tiger (1980) - Big Brother
- The Young Master (1980) - extra (uncredited) / stunts (uncredited)
- The Legal Illegal (1981) - cameo
- Return of the Deadly Blade (1981) - One of the Tun brothers
- Game of Death II (1981) - guard in the cave / stunts (uncredited)
- Dragon Lord (1982) - Chin / Cowboy
- The Trail (1983) - Fatty / action director / stunt co-ordinator
- Project A (1983) - Mars / Jaws / stunts / assistant action director
- Winners and Sinners (1983) - Robber stealing Archie's briefcase (cameo)
- Wheels on Meals (1984) - extra (uncredited) / action director / stunt co-ordinator
- Pom Pom (1984) - Motorcycle Cop (cameo)
- The Protector - martial arts co-ordinator
- Police Story (1985) - Inspector Kim / action director / stunt unit / stunts (uncredited)
- Armour of God (1986) - extra (uncredited) / stunts(uncredited)
- Naughty Boys (1986) - Sheng
- Project A Part II (1987) - Mars / Jaws / stunts / action director
- Magic Story (1987) - Taoist priest
- The Inspector Wears Skirts (1988) - Member of Tiger Squad
- Spooky, Spooky (1988) - East Bay Cop Mars
- Police Story 2 (1988) - Inspector Kim
- Dragons Forever (1988) - stunts
- Miracles (1989) - Police Sergeant / stunts
- The Inspector Wears Skirts II (1989) - Mars
- Undeclared War (1990) - Tiger (as Fo Sing) / stunts
- Stage Door Johnny (1990) - Kuo
- The Banquet (1991) - Man at Table (as Sing Feng)
- Armour of God II: Operation Condor (1991) - extra (uncredited) / stunts (uncredited)
- Angry Ranger (1991) - extra (uncredited) / stunts
- Twin Dragons (1992) - Street Goon (uncredited) / stunts (uncredited)
- Police Story 3: Super Cop (1992) - Hsiung (uncredited) / stunts (uncredited)
- Crime Story (1993) - Bank Robber (uncredited) / stunts
- Once a Cop (1993) - Jewelry store customer (as Fo Sing) / stunts (uncredited)
- Drunken Master II (1994) - Fight Spectator in the crowd/Thug in final fight (2 roles)(uncredited) / stunts (as Fo Sing) / assistant action director
- The Wrath of Silence (1994) - Detective / action director
- Red Zone (1995) - Prison Guard with Food
- Thunderbolt (1995) - Saw's thug (uncredited) / stunts (as Chiang Wing Fat)
- Rumble in the Bronx (1995) - stunts (uncredited)
- How to Meet the Lucky Stars (1996) - Mahjong Player / action director
- Police Story 4: First Strike (1996) - stunts (uncredited)
- Once Upon a Time in China and America (1997) - extra (uncredited) / stunts (as Chiang Wing Fat)
- Mr. Nice Guy (1997) - extra (uncredited) / stunts (as Chiang Wing Fat) / action director
- Double Team (1997) - stunts (uncredited)
- Till Death Do Us Part (1998) - Bill's man / stunts
- Rush Hour (1998) - Juntao's Man in Hong Kong (uncredited) / stunts (uncredited)
- Knock Off (1998) - stunts (uncredited) / assistant action director (uncredited)
- Gorgeous (1999) - Masked Metal Bat Thug (uncredited) / stunts (uncredited)
- Jackie Chan: My Stunts (1999) - Himself (Jackie Chan Stunt Team) / stunts (uncredited)
- Moonlight Express (1999) - Officer Tung's detective
- No Problem (1999) - cameo / stunts
- Prostitute Killers (2000) - One of Brother Shark's men / stunts
- Rush Hour 2 (2001) - extra (uncredited) / stunts (uncredited)
- Virtues of Harmony (TV series) (2002) - Chan Wan (cameo)
- Born Wild (2001) - action director
- Inner Senses (2002) - action director
- No Problem 2 (2002) - stunts (as Jiang Wing-Fat) / assistant action director
- Give Them a Chance (2003) - action director
- Shanghai Knights (2003) - Torch Thug (uncredited) / stunts (uncredited)
- Around the World in 80 Days (2004) - Scorpion / stunts (uncredited)
- New Police Story (2004) - extra (uncredited) / stunts (uncredited)
- Kung Fu Mahjong 3 - The Final Duel (2007) - Uncle Pao / action director
- Bullet & Brain (2007) - Inspector Wong / action director
- I Corrupt All Cops (2009) - Det. Sgt Major at meeting / action director
- 72 Tenants of Prosperity (2010) - action director
- The Other Truth (TV series) (2011) - Lo Yiu Fat (Episode 20–25)
- When Heaven Burns (TV series) (2011) - Leslie (cameo) (Episode 10)
- Brother's Keeper (TV series) (2013) - Brother Babi
- Bet Hur (TV series) (2017) - Slaughter city bodyguard
- Gong fu lian meng (TV series) (2018) - A-Niu
- Sun Wukong Da Zhan Pan Si Dong (2020)
- New Kung Fu Cult Master (2022) - Kong Wen
- Golden Boy (2025)

== See also ==
- Jackie Chan Stunt Team
- Jackie Chan
