= His Name Is Nobody =

1979 Hong Kong film by Karl Maka

- DVD cover
- Traditional Chinese: 無名小卒
- Simplified Chinese: 无名小卒
- Hanyu Pinyin: Wú Míng Xiǎo Zú
- Jyutping: Mou4 Ming4 Siu2 Zeot1
- Directed by: Karl Maka
- Screenplay by: Karl Maka
- Produced by: Guy Lai
- Starring: Lau Kar-wing; Dean Shek; Bryan Leung
- Cinematography: Manny Ho
- Edited by: Tony Chow
- Production company: Sharp Films Company
- Release date: 16 August 1979
- Running time: 96 minutes
- Country: Hong Kong
- Language: Cantonese

His Name Is Nobody is a 1979 Hong Kong martial arts comedy film, written and directed by Karl Maka and starring Lau Kar-wing, Dean Shek and Bryan Leung.

The film initially focuses on a master-and-apprentice duo of con artists who participate in a murder scheme against a professional contract killer. They use a honey trapping method against him, but it backfires and the intended victim kills the woman used in this attempt. The apprentice improves his martial arts skills in preparation for a confrontation with his foe.

== Plot ==
The Nobody Kid (Lau Kar-wing) is a street urchin who was abandoned as a child and does not have a name. One day, he meets Sting (Dean Shek), a master con artist, who takes Nobody as his disciple and teaches him swindling and martial arts skills.

The duo is later enlisted by Sting's brother, Baldy (Karl Maka), to murder Ping the Dreg (Chung Fat), a professional assassin. Sting and Nobody plan to take advantage of Ping's lust for women and use Baldy's wife to seduce Ping. However, their plan fails and Ping kills Baldy's wife, while Sting and Nobody are separated as well.

While alone, Nobody meets Koo the Iron Heart (Bryan Leung), an elderly martial arts master and Ping's rival, who also takes Nobody as his disciple and teaches him his skills. However, Koo is later killed by Ping. Nobody eventually reunites with Sting, and together, they confront Ping for vengeance.

== Cast ==
- Lau Kar-wing as The Nobody Kid
- Dean Shek as Sting
- Bryan Leung as Koo the Iron Heart
- Chung Fat as Ping the Dreg
- Karl Maka as Baldy
- Chiu Chi-ling as Kung fu master
- Addy Sung
- Yau Poi-ling
- To Siu-ming as Man in restaurant (cameo)
- Lam Ching-ying as Man wearing black wig
- Mars as Man in restaurant (cameo)
- Ho Pak-kwong as Man with bird cage
- Tai San as Lost son
- Tsang Cho-lam as Fee collector for bridge passo
- Yue Tau-wan (cameo)
- Billy Chan as Killer with long white hair
- Pan Yung-sheng
- Meg Lam as Baldy's wife
- Chung Hei as Father of lost son
- Johnny Cheung
- Yuen Miu
- Cheung Chok-chow as Ping's agent
- To Wai-wo
- Lo Wai
- Guy Lai
- Ho Wan
- Lung Ying
- Ho Bo-sing

== Critical reception ==
Andrew Saroch of Far East Films gave the film a score of three out of five stars and describes the film as "a diverting production that manages to challenge a few clichés of the genre" and praises Dean Shek's performance as "endearing".
