= Enter the Fat Dragon =

Enter the Fat Dragon may refer to:

- Enter the Fat Dragon (1978 film), a Hong Kong martial arts film
- Enter the Fat Dragon (2020 film), a Hong Kong martial arts comedy film
