= Dirty Tiger, Crazy Frog =

1978 Hong Kong film by Karl Maka

- Theatrical poster
- Traditional Chinese: 老虎田雞
- Simplified Chinese: 老虎田鸡
- Hanyu Pinyin: Lǎo Hǔ Tián Jī
- Jyutping: Lou5 Fu2 Tin4 Gai1
- Directed by: Karl Maka
- Written by: Karl Maka; Eric Tsang
- Produced by: Sammo Hung; Karl Maka; Lau Kar-wing
- Starring: Sammo Hung; Lau Kar-wing; Jason Pai; Meg Lam; Dean Shek
- Cinematography: Manny Ho
- Edited by: Tony Chow
- Music by: Frankie Chan
- Distributed by: Gar Bo Motion Picture Company
- Release date: 21 July 1978
- Running time: 97 minutes
- Country: Hong Kong
- Language: Cantonese

Dirty Tiger, Crazy Frog (Chinese: 老虎田雞), also known as Nutty Kickbox Cops, is a 1978 Hong Kong martial arts comedy film directed by Karl Maka, who also wrote the screenplay with Eric Tsang, produced with Sammo Hung and Lau Kar-wing, who both starred in the lead roles. The film was one of two (along with Odd Couple) produced by Gar Bo Motion Picture Company, a company formed by Hung, Maka and Lau.

The film also features cameos from Yuen Biao, Lam Ching-ying and Hsiao Ho.

== Cast ==
- Sammo Hung as Frog
- Lau Kar-wing as Tiger
- Jason Pai as Smiling Tiger
- Meg Lam as Muti hand chick
- Dean Shek as Panther
- Hoi Sang Lee as White Brow Monk
- Karl Maka as Sheriff
- To Siu-ming as 3 Trick Kid
- Lam Ching-ying as One of Panther's men
- Chin Yuet-sang as Chicken
- Chung Fat as Chicken's blood brother
- Cheng Kang-yeh as Coffin King
- Fung King-man as Casino dealer
- Fung Hak-on as Pimp (Cameo)
- Mars as 3 Trick Kid's partner
- Alan Hsu as Man getting pickpocketed at casino (Cameo)
- Yuen Biao as Casino fighter
- Hsiao Ho as One of Panther's men
- Huang Ha as Chicken's blood brother
- Billy Chan as One of Panther's men
- Peter Chan as One of Panther's men
- Tsang Choh-lam as Innkeeper
- Mang Hoi as Casino fighter
- Lam Hak-ming as Casino fighter
- Johnny Cheung as One of Coffin King's men
- Lau Ka-yung as One of Coffin King's men
- Ho Pak-kwong as Casino manager
- Chan Lap-ban as Frog's wife
- Pan Yung-sheng as Casino fighter
- Ho Chi-wai as One of Coffin King's men
