= Skinny Tiger, Fatty Dragon =

1990 Hong Kong film by Lau Kar-wing

- UK DVD cover
- Traditional Chinese: 瘦虎肥龍
- Simplified Chinese: 瘦虎肥龙
- Hanyu Pinyin: Shòu Hǔ Féi Lóng
- Jyutping: Sau3 Fu2 Fei4 Lung4
- Directed by: Lau Kar-wing
- Written by: Chang Kwok-tse
- Produced by: Wellington Fung; Andrew Yau
- Starring: Sammo Hung; Karl Maka; Carrie Ng; Wanda Yung
- Cinematography: Gray Ho
- Edited by: Wong Ming-lam
- Music by: Richard Lo
- Production companies: Cinema Capital Entertainment; Cinema City & Films Co.
- Distributed by: Golden Princess Amusement
- Release date: 28 June 1990
- Running time: 100 minutes
- Country: Hong Kong
- Language: Cantonese
- Box office: HK$10,270,954

Skinny Tiger, Fatty Dragon (Chinese: 瘦虎肥龍) is a 1990 Hong Kong action comedy film directed by Lau Kar-wing. The film stars Sammo Hung and Karl Maka. The trio had worked together in the late 1970s, making two films for Lau and Hung's short-lived Gar Bo Motion Picture Company. Whilst Lau continued to appear in Hung's films for Golden Harvest throughout the 1980s, Maka had gone on to co-run Cinema City. Skinny Tiger, Fatty Dragon was therefore something of a reunion for the three actors.

== Plot ==
Fatty and Baldy are a pair of detectives dealing with a crime syndicate of Triad gangsters. After a jewelry robbery, they later find Lai, a woman who is associated with the gangsters, but end up getting themselves into trouble for going into the women's changing room.

The gang leader, Wing, learns that one of his henchmen, Johnny, has leaked his secrets so he is stabbed by Wing himself.

During their investigation of the Lai's house, things go very wrong for Fatty and Baldy, and they end up imitating robbers in order to escape from the gang. They steal her car and are briefly chased by the gangsters, trashing it along the way. Later that night, Lai calls Fatty and arranges a meeting at an abandoned building. At the location, another fight ensues, followed by a chase of Lai's boss, "Prince" Tak, and Fatty ends up ruining the English Deputy Commissioner's wedding.

Fatty and Baldy are ordered to leave Hong Kong while things settle down, so they head to Singapore. However, Lai, who has turned against her gang, is killed by a pair of transsexual assassins from Thailand. When Fatty is about to have dinner with Baldy and his girlfriend, he inadvertently ruins their relationship. So the pair have dinner outside, leading to another confrontation. Baldy defeated two English henchmen, whilst Fatty is fighting the transsexual assassins.

In the aftermath of the event, Fatty's father and Baldy's girlfriend are hospitalised. Realising they will never have peace until Wing is stopped, they apprehend Tak at an abandoned warehouse full of gas cylinders. The plan goes sour, leading to a final confrontation with the gangsters. The two English henchmen try to take down Baldy while Fatty uses nunchaku. In the midst of the finale, Fatty temporarily knocks Tak's brother down and tries to take Tak out. At the final moment, Tak's brother fires his gun, he hits the gas cylinders and Baldy and Fatty escape, killing everyone in the process. In the end, the police chief stops Fatty and Baldy from fighting after an argument over money.

== Cast ==
- Sammo Hung as Detective Fatty Dragon
- Karl Maka as Detective Baldy Mak Sui-fu
- Carrie Ng as Lai
- Wanda Yung as Tall Girl
- Lung Ming-yan as "Prince" Tak / Ted
- Yip Seung-wa as Tak's brother
- Bowie Wu as Inspector Wu
- Ni Kuang as Dragon's father
- Lau Kar-wing as Wing
- Tai Bo as Johnny
- Sin Ho-ying as Ho / Howard
- Ridley Tsui as Pak
- Ng Ching-ching as Jing-jing
- Cutie Mui as Tall Girl's neighbour
- Mark Houghton as English gang member
- Max Gusinsky as English gang member
- Wan Seung-lam as gang member
- Gabriel Wong as burglar
- Hung Yan-yan as robber
- Jackson Ng as robber
- Kong Long as robber
- Lo Hung as man at wedding party
- Patrick Gamble as Lai's lawyer
- Yeung Yau-cheung as waiter
- Ng Kwok-kin as policeman
- Garry Chan as suspect at police station
- Wilson Yip as man on the street
- Strawberry Yeung as karaoke singer
- Chang Seng-kwong as thug

== Production ==
=== Bruce Lee references ===
Sammo Hung impersonated Bruce Lee in two early films prior to this, Enter the Fat Dragon and Millionaire's Express with Cynthia Rothrock in a brief fight together. This is the final film in which he relates the early Lee references into the 90's.

- The tap with the two metal bars is seen in Game of Death with Bruce Lee and Dan Inosanto before the nunchaku fight. Also the use of the nunchaku is used in the finale at an abandoned warehouse full of barrels which goes back to Fist of Fury in which Lee introduces the weapon and Enter the Fat Dragon in which Sammo first used the weapon.
- Hung holding of one of the henchman's hair is seen in Enter the Dragon in which Jackie Chan tries to attack Bruce but got his neck snapped off camera.
- The brief fight with Sammo Hung and Mark Houghton is similar to Way of the Dragon with Bruce Lee and Chuck Norris. Then follows up with Lee attacking the guy with the gun while in Nora Miao's apartment.
- The German shepherd dog is a reference to The Big Boss. Also is the use of the double knives in the finale of both movies although shot in a different way.
- During the robbery attack, Hung attacking the man on the ground with the groin attack is similar to Way of the Dragon with Lee and Bob Wall.
- Hung's kick shot with Ridley Tsui in the abandoned warehouse is similar to Enter the Dragon with Lee's kick to Shih Kien's head.

=== Proposed villain role ===
When Bey Logan interviewed Mark Houghton, he initially is tasked to find a black businessman which is supposed to be another tribute to Game of Death. Unfortunately he offended a few of them with one who believes he has no business in being in the film. Houghton thought he would be in trouble for offending a black businessman so he told Lau Kar-wing that he couldn't find any so the director would step in as the main bad guy for this role.

=== Location ===
Much of the film was recorded in Singapore, but the rest was filmed in the New Territories and Hong Kong.

=== Overall look at the film ===
In an interview on DVD with Lau Kar-wing, Karl Maka, who looked at the film, felt there was lack of balance between comedy and action. Initially there's too much action and not enough comedy, so the film was changed to improve the balance.

== Box office ==
Skinny Tiger, Fatty Dragon earned HK $10,270,954.00 at the Hong Kong box office.

== Reception ==
Bey Logan pointed out on the commentary track of the Hong Kong Legends DVD release of the movie why the film was moderately successful. There are certain logic and structural issues which are considered to be negative aspects. A few examples were the car chasing sequence in which he explains that if the heroes were just to call the police, the villains would be arrested, the film would be over and the scene wouldn't be as funny. The other is the Singapore holiday as he explains, after the Chinese wedding catastrophe, the film should be gaining momentum but instead goes down like a holiday expedition. So overall, the pace of the story is let down for that reason.

For Western audiences, the character of "Baldy", played by Karl Maka, is described as being "over the top". Maka was known for playing similar characters, most prominently in the Aces Go Places series. However, this performance was really playing to the less sophisticated Asian audiences of the time who liked that style of broad humour.

More well received were the action sequences with Sammo Hung. After Bruceploitation, fans of Bruce Lee would disregard any film that tried to poorly imitate Lee's films. However, in Logan's opinion, Hung's style of action is regarded as successful because of the way he is able to interpret Lee in his own style, whilst designing fight sequences that are able to incorporate early Bruce Lee references in a unique fashion.

Also, because of his previous work on Enter the Fat Dragon, Hung is more accepted as a Bruce Lee impersonator, because of his early appearance in Enter the Dragon, his action choreography and also his involvement in Game of Death. Also of importance are his bulky appearance and the fact that he doesn't look like Lee (apart from his pudding bowl haircut).

== See also ==
- List of Hong Kong films of 1990
- Sammo Hung filmography
