= The Haunted Island =

The Haunted Island may refer to:

- The Haunted Island, a Frog Detective Game, a 2018 comedy adventure video game
- The Haunted Island (film), a 1988 comedy horror film directed by Sammo Hung
- Haunted Island, a 1928 American silent action film serial directed by Robert F. Hill
