= Those Merry Souls =

1985 Hong Kong film by Lau Kar-wing

- Film poster
- Traditional Chinese: 時來運轉
- Simplified Chinese: 时来运转
- Hanyu Pinyin: Shí Lái Yùn Zhuǎn
- Jyutping: Si4 Loi4 Wan6 Zyun2
- Directed by: Lau Kar-wing
- Written by: Sze-to Cheuk-hon; Wong Ying
- Produced by: Sammo Hung
- Starring: Yuen Biao; Eric Tsang; Lam Ching-ying; Stanley Fung
- Cinematography: James Chan; Cheung Yiu-cho
- Edited by: Peter Cheung; Keung Chuen-tak
- Music by: The Melody Bank
- Production company: Bo Ho Films
- Distributed by: Golden Harvest Productions
- Release date: 30 May 1985
- Running time: 112 minutes
- Country: Hong Kong
- Language: Cantonese
- Box office: HK$8,066,272

Those Merry Souls (Chinese: 時來運轉) is a 1985 Hong Kong action comedy horror film directed by Lau Kar-wing and starring Yuen Biao and Eric Tsang. The film is also known as From the Great Beyond.

== Cast ==
- Yuen Biao as Chiu Chi-lung
- Eric Tsang as Ng Kuai-tak
- Lam Ching-ying as Tak's father
- Stanley Fung as Uncle Chiu
- Elaine Jin as Waterloo Tai
- Ng Ha-ping as Lily Ting
- Lily Li as Auntie Pearl
- Richard Ng as Fernando Ng
- Lau Kar-wing as Person practicing Kung Fu
- Chung Fat as Death Messenger
- Yam Ho as Janitor
- Wu Ma as Ma
- Billy Lau as Doctor
- Moon Lee as Fung
- Lam Wai as Movie Patron
- Fung King-man as Alley Gang Member
- Billy Ching as Billy
- Lam Leung-wai as Lok Man
- Yue Ming as George
- Sammo Hung as Movie Director
- Fruit Chan as Assistant Director
- Pan Yun-sheng as Man at Beach
- Chin Ka-lok as Beach Thug
- Chu Tau as Beach Thug
- Mak Wai-cheung as Beach Thug
- Lee Chi-kit
- Pang Yun-cheung as Thug in Public
- Chun Kwai-bo as Thug in Public

== Production ==
It is one of the ghost films directed by Lau Kar-Wing.

== Reception ==
A retrospective review finds that "Those Merry Souls is another typically quirky 80’s Hong Kong movie that falls firmly into the category of “strange but immensely fun”." A similar assessment is made by other reviewers.
