= Rosa (1986 film) =

1986 Hong Kong film by Joe Cheung

- Film poster
- Traditional Chinese: 神勇雙響炮續集
- Simplified Chinese: 神勇双响炮续集
- Hanyu Pinyin: Shén Yǒng Shuāng Xiǎng Pào Xù Jí
- Jyutping: San4 Jung2 Seong1 Heong2 Paau3 Zeok6 Zap6
- Directed by: Joe Cheung
- Screenplay by: Wong Kar-wai; Barry Wong
- Produced by: Sammo Hung
- Starring: Yuen Biao; Lowell Lo; Luk Siu-fan; Kara Hui; Paul Chun
- Cinematography: Tom Lau; Jimmy Leung
- Edited by: Peter Cheung
- Music by: Lowell Lo; Sherman Chow
- Production company: Bo Ho Films
- Distributed by: Golden Harvest
- Release date: 20 June 1986
- Running time: 96 minutes
- Country: Hong Kong
- Language: Cantonese
- Box office: HK$11,108,518

Rosa (Chinese: 神勇雙響炮續集) is a 1986 Hong Kong action comedy film directed by Joe Cheung and starring Yuen Biao, Lowell Lo, Luk Siu-fan, Kara Hui and Paul Chun. The film's Chinese title literally means Supernaturally Brave Artillery Sequel. Despite this, it is not the sequel to the 1984 film Pom Pom, whose Chinese title literally means Supernaturally Brave Artillery.

== Plot ==
Ha, nicknamed "Little Monster" (Yuen Biao), is an elite member of the Criminal Investigation Division (CID) of the Royal Hong Kong Police Force. One time while arresting a criminal, Ha accidentally humiliates Chief Inspector Tin (Paul Chun), who is demoted as a result. Lui Kung (Lowell Lo), another CID officer, causes Tin's wife to give birth prematurely in a car accident while chasing criminals.

Later, Ha and Kung were transferred to the Case Analysis Division, where they are supervised by Tin. Kung has a younger sister, Lui Lui (Kara Hui), whom he cares for and treasures deeply and he does not allow anyone to pursue her. However, due to coincidences, Ha gets to know Lui and they develop a romantic relationship, much to the displeasure of Kung. Later, Ha and Kung work together to capture Lee Wai-fung (Charlie Cho), a former undercover cop who has gone rogue and becoming the biggest drug trafficker in Asia.

== Cast ==
- Yuen Biao as 'Little Monster' Ha
- Lowell Lo as 'Mustache' Lui Kung
- Luk Siu-fan as Rosa
- Kara Hui as Lui Lui
- Paul Chun as Tin
- James Tien as Wong Ping-tong
- Charlie Cho as Lee Wai-fung
- Dick Wei as Tong's assistant in white suit
- Chung Fat as Tong's assistant in black suit
- Huang Ha as Chiu Chow-hon
- Ban Yun-sang as Roger
- Billy Ching as Siu Ba-wong
- Hsu Hsia as Boss Ho
- Ka Lee as Traffic cop
- Yuen Miu as Policeman
- Peter Chan as Loanshark Choi's sun
- Blackie Ko as Jeep driver who beat red traffic-light
- Tai Po as Police agent Moore
- Fung King-man as Loanshark Choi
- Tai San as Man wearing black gloves in restaurant
- Chan Chuen as King Pickpocket
- Felix Lok as Car dealer
- Chu Tau as Criminal Hung
- Pan Yun-cheung as Policeman
- Cheung Yun-cheung as In-law Chung
- Yuen Sai-kwan as Robber
- Albert Lo as Siu Kai
- Yau Pui-ling as Mrs. Tin
- Chui Chung-hok as One of Loanshark Choi's men
- Sze Gai-keung as Fat Lion
- Lee Chuen-sing as Hospital doctor
- Chan Ming-wai
- Cheung Wing-hon
- Tse Fook-yiu as One of Loanshark Choi's men
- Lung Ying
- Lam Foo-wai
- Chun Kwai-bo
- Chang Sing-kwong
- Wong Kim-ban

== Theme song ==
- Capture My Heart (俘擄我的心)
  - Composer/Singer: Lowell Lo
  - Lyricist: Cheng Kwok-kong

== Reception ==
=== Critical ===
Andrew Saroch of Far East Films rated the film 3.5 out of 5 stars praising the film as entertaining despite its simple story and its action scenes and humor.

=== Box office ===
The film grossed HK$11,108,518 at the Hong Kong box office during its theatrical run from 20 June to 2 July 1986 in Hong Kong.

== See also ==
- Sammo Hung filmography
- Yuen Biao filmography
