= Warriors Two =

1978 Hong Kong film by Sammo Hung

- Hong Kong film poster

Chinese name
- Traditional Chinese: 贊先生與找錢華
- Simplified Chinese: 赞先生与找钱华
Transcriptions
Standard Mandarin
- Hanyu Pinyin: Zàn Xiān Sheng Yǔ Zhǎo Qián Huá
Yue: Cantonese
- Jyutping: Zaan3 Sin1 Saang1 Jyu2 Zaau2 Cin2 Wa4
- Directed by: Sammo Hung
- Written by: Sammo Hung
- Produced by: Raymond Chow
- Starring: Bryan Leung; Sammo Hung; Casanova Wong; Fung Hak-on; Billy Chan; Dean Shek
- Cinematography: Ricky Lau
- Edited by: Peter Cheung
- Music by: Frankie Chan
- Distributed by: Golden Harvest
- Release date: 28 December 1978
- Running time: 90 minutes
- Country: Hong Kong
- Language: Cantonese

Warriors Two (Chinese: 贊先生與找錢華) is a 1978 Hong Kong martial arts film written and directed by Sammo Hung, who also co-stars in the film. The film stars Bryan Leung, Casanova Wong and Fung Hak-on. Leung plays the character of the historical figure, Leung Jan (or Leung Tsan), a well-known early practitioner of the Wing Chun style of kung fu. Leung's association with Wing Chun can be considered as the equivalent of Wong Fei-hung's association with the Hung Gar style.

Along with The Prodigal Son, Warriors Two is considered one of the best martial arts film displaying the authentic version of the Wing Chun style. Despite the title, Warriors Two is not a sequel. Rather it refers to the two main warriors of the film, and the literal translation of the Hong Kong title is "Mr. Tsang and Cashier Hua".

== Plot ==
Mr. Tsan is a doctor and master of Wing Chun who can trace his martial lineage back to the style's founder. He is grudgingly persuaded by Fei Chun, his lead student, to teach kung fu to Cashier Hua, a patient hiding out at his residence. Hua had previously overheard a businessman named Mo and several of his men plotting to take over the town by killing the head of the town. Unfortunately, Hua made the mistake of warning Mo's wormy henchman, Master Yao and a trap was set that nearly cost the poor cashier his life. Whilst in hiding, Hua sends Fei Chun to warn the town head. Ignores the advice, the town head is later attacked by Mo's men, although it is unclear whether he escapes or is killed after a protracted fight.

Meanwhile, Tsan runs Hua through an elaborate series of Wing Chun training sessions before he falls victim to a vicious trap set by Mo who has learned of Hua's whereabouts. With nothing left to lose, Hua, Fei Chun, and Tsan's niece split up to use specific Wing Chun styles against Mo's leading fighters. Trouble mounts when it is discovered that Fei mixed up the fighter's names and each of Tsan's students have to improvise in order to win against their opponents.

== Cast ==
- Bryan Leung - Leung Jan/Master Tsang
- Sammo Hung - Kei Cheun
- Casanova Wong - Cashier Wah
- Dean Shek - Master Yao
- Fung Hak-on - Mo
- Lee Hoi-sang - Iron Fist
- Lau Kar-wing - Town Chief's Bodyguard
- Tiger Yang - Thunder Pai
- Yeung Wai - Tiger
- Chin Yuet-sang - Leung's Student/Twin Swordsmen (2 roles)
- Mang Hoi - Leung's Student/Twin Swordsmen (2 roles)
- Billy Chan - Thunder's Men
- Peter Chan Lung - Rip off Kei
- Eric Tsang - Rip off Kei
- Lam Ching-ying - Thunder's Men
- Yuen Biao - Thunder's Men
- Wellson Chin - Thunder's Men
- Chung Fat - Assassin Beggar
- Mars - Thunder's Men
- Choe Mu Ung - Town's Chief

== See also ==
- List of Hong Kong films
- Sammo Hung filmography
