= Joe Cheung =

Hong Kong filmmaker and actor (born 1944)

Joe Cheung Tung-joe
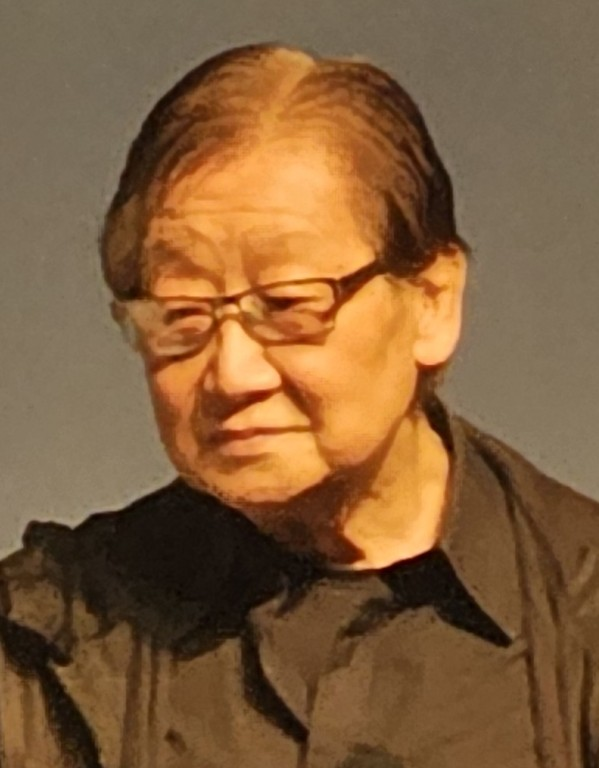
- Cheung in 2026
- Born: 24 July 1944 (age 82); Japanese Hong Kong
- Occupations: film director, actor, producer, scriptwriter
- Years active: 1971–present

Chinese name
- Traditional Chinese: 張同祖
- Simplified Chinese: 张同祖
Transcriptions

Joe Cheung Tung-joe (張同祖, born 24 July 1944) is a Hong Kong director, producer, scriptwriter and actor.

== Filmography ==
=== As director ===
- The Incredible Kung Fu Master (1979)
- Killer Wears White (1980)
- Dan bo dan (1981)
- Pom Pom (1984)
- Feng liu zhong (1984)
- Xiao sheng you liao (1984)
- Kai xin shuang xiang pao (1985)
- Rosa (1986)
- Flaming Brothers (1987)
- Huo wu feng yun (1988)
- Hao nu shi ba jia (1988)
- Hong Kong Corruptor (1990)
- The Banquet (1991)
- Pom Pom and Hot Hot (1992)
- The True Hero (1994)
- My Dad Is a Jerk! (1997)
- Kung Fu Wing Chun (2010)

=== As actor ===
- Once a Cop (1993)
- Poker King (2009) - Fernado
- ICAC Investigators 2009 (2009) (TV series)
- Merry-Go-Round (2010)
- ICAC Investigators 2011 (2011)
- Z Storm (2014)
- Gangster Payday (2014)
- Kung Fu Jungle (2014)
- Little Big Master (2015)
- S Storm (2016)
- No. 1 Chung Ying Street (2018)
