= Scared Stiff (1987 film) =

1987 Hong Kong film by Lau Kar-wing

- Film poster
- Directed by: Lau Kar-wing
- Screenplay by: Szeto Cheuk-hon
- Story by: Wong Ying-kit; Ng Kam-hung
- Produced by: Sammo Hung
- Starring: Eric Tsang; Chow Yun-fat; Michael Miu; Emily Chu; Anita Mui
- Cinematography: Chan Kwong-hung
- Edited by: Peter Cheung
- Music by: Danny Chung; Anders Nelsson; Alastair Monteith-Hodge; The Melody Bank
- Production companies: Bo Ho Films Co, Ltd; Paragon Films Ltd; Movie Impact
- Release date: 6 March 1987
- Running time: 93 minutes
- Country: Hong Kong
- Language: Cantonese
- Budget: HK$7,385,307

Scared Stiff (Chinese: 小生夢驚魂) is a 1987 Hong Kong comedy thriller film directed by Lau Kar-wing and starring Eric Tsang, Chow Yun-fat and Michael Miu. This film has been seen as a Hong Kong take-off on the plot of the 1984 US thriller Dreamscape.

== Plot ==
A psychiatrist donates his time to help the mentally ill street people of Hong Kong. A reporter hears about his activities, and starts accompanying him on his rounds.

== Cast ==
- Eric Tsang as Halley Tsang Siu-wai
- Chow Yun-fat as Inspector Chow
- Michael Miu as David Miu Tai-wai
- Emily Chu as Alice
- Bowie Wu as Dr. Wu
- Anita Mui as May
- Wu Ma as Vampire hunter
- Dennis Chan as Ming
- Phillip Ko as Chow's follower
- Sandra Ng as Judy
- Michelle Sze-ma as Janice
- Margie Tsang as Mandy
- Yuen Wah as Wah
