= Treasure Hunters (1981 film) =

1981 Hong Kong film by Lau Kar-wing

- Film poster
- 龍虎小英雄
- Directed by: Lau Kar Wing
- Written by: Wong Jing
- Produced by: Mona Fong
- Starring: Alexander Fu Sheng; Gordon Liu
- Cinematography: Au Kam-Hung
- Edited by: Chiang Hsing-Lung; Lee Yim-Hoi
- Production company: Shaw Brothers
- Distributed by: Shaw Brothers
- Release date: 9 July 1981 (Hong Kong)
- Country: Hong Kong
- Language: Cantonese

Treasure Hunters (Chinese: 龍虎小英雄), also known as Master of Disaster, is a Shaw Brothers film directed by Lau Kar Wing, starring Alexander Fu Sheng and Gordon Liu. It was released in 1981.

== Cast ==
- Alexander Fu Sheng as Chut Do Bo
- Gordon Liu as Mo Seung
- Chang Chan Peng as Jue Gow
- Wang Lung Wei as Lord Mok
- Wilson Tong as Cho Hung

== Reception ==
In a review for fareastfilms.com, reviewer Andrew Saroch wrote, "This is importantly a kung fu comedy and within this sub-genre, it could certainly be considered a solid hit. The infectious quality of the film’s comedy is well coupled with the blistering scenes of martial arts mayhem. With this in mind, 'Treasure Hunters' never has a dull moment and from the opening credits to the very last kicks of the finale this is a top-notch Shaw Brothers' [sic] film. The humour may be a bit too broad for some and perhaps too pervasive, but it's very hard not to be swept along by the sheer exuberance of the production."
