= The Brutal Boxer =

1972 Hong Kong film by Guan Shan

- Directed by: Guan Shan
- Written by: Ni Kuang
- Starring: Jackie Chan; Chan Sing; Tien Ni; Mars; Corey Yuen
- Release date: 1972
- Running time: 73 minutes
- Country: Hong Kong
- Language: Mandarin
- Box office: HK$838,708 (Hong Kong); 169,739 tickets (France)

The Brutal Boxer (Chinese: 唐人客) is a 1972 Hong Kong film.

== Cast ==
- Jackie Chan
- Chan Sing
- Tien Ni
- Raymond Lui Sing Kung
- Mars
- Wilson Tong
- Guan Shan
- Alan Tang Kong Wing
- Got Heung Ting
- Corey Yuen
