= Naughty Boys (film) =

1986 Hong Kong film by Wellson Chin

- Traditional Chinese: 扭計雜牌軍
- Simplified Chinese: 扭计杂牌军
- Hanyu Pinyin: Niǔ jì zápái jūn
- Jyutping: Nau2 gai3 zaap6 paai4 gwan1
- Directed by: Wellson Chin
- Written by: Chung Guk-fong; Edward Tang
- Produced by: Jackie Chan
- Starring: Kara Hui; Carina Lau; Mars
- Cinematography: Cheung Yiu Cho
- Edited by: Peter Cheung
- Music by: Michael Lai; Tang Siu Lam
- Production company: Paragon Films
- Distributed by: Golden Harvest
- Release date: 25 July 1986
- Country: Hong Kong
- Language: Cantonese

Naughty Boys (Chinese: 扭計雜牌軍; Jyutping: nau2 gai3 zaap6 paai4 gwan1, released in the Philippines as Supercop Protectors) is a 1986 Hong Kong martial arts crime comedy film directed by Wellson Chin, produced by Jackie Chan, and starring Kara Hui, Carina Lau, and Mars. The film was released in Hong Kong on 25 July 1986.

In the film, an ex-convict discovers that his gang's hidden loot has been replaced with useless rocks. His former partners blame him for the theft and chase him.

== Plot ==
Four convicts plan to retrieve the diamond cache they hid before their imprisonment. One of them, Sheng, is released from prison early, and discovers that someone replaced the diamonds with rocks. The three other convicts mistakenly think he is keeping the diamonds for himself, and a chase for Sheng ensues all throughout Hong Kong.

== Cast ==
- Kara Hui as Chuan
- Carina Lau as Bonnie, an investigator
- Mars as Sheng, Chuan's brother
- Clarence Ford as Liang, a travel agent
- Billy Lau as Kuang Fu
- Paul Chang
- Phillip Ko as Ma Hui
- Lo Mang as Huo Chiang
- Tai Po as Piao
- Chu Tit-wo

Jackie Chan has a cameo appearance in the film as a prisoner.

== Release ==
Naughty Boys was released in Hong Kong on 25 July 1986. In the Philippines, the film was released by Pioneer Releasing as Supercop Protectors on 23 August 1988; posters miscredit Jackie Chan as its writer and director.

== Home media ==
Naughty Boys was released on VHS in Japan on 21 October 1990.

The film was first released on DVD by Deltamac in Hong Kong on 31 December 2002; it has since gone out of print. The film was given by Joy Sales a VCD release on 23 July 2007, and another DVD release on 4 March 2010.
