= Knockabout (film) =

1979 Hong Kong film by Sammo Hung

- Hong Kong film poster
- Directed by: Sammo Hung
- Written by: Louis Lau; Huang Chik-chin
- Produced by: Raymond Chow
- Starring: Yuen Biao; Sammo Hung; Liang Chia-jen
- Cinematography: Ricky Lau
- Edited by: Peter Cheung
- Music by: Chen Hsun-chi
- Distributed by: Golden Harvest
- Release date: 12 April 1979
- Running time: 92 minutes
- Country: Hong Kong
- Language: Cantonese
- Box office: HK $2,830,519.80

Knockabout (Chinese: 雜家小子; Za jia xiao zi) is a 1979 Hong Kong martial arts comedy film starring Yuen Biao and directed by Sammo Hung, who also co-stars in the film.

== Plot ==
The film follows two con artist brothers, Yipao / Little John (Yuen Biao) and Taipao / Big John (Bryan Leung). One day they are cheated out of their ill-gotten gains in an encounter with Jia Wu Dao / Silver Fox (Lau Kar Wing). They try to fight him, to retrieve their money, but are defeated, so they ask him to train them, hoping to become the best fighters in the city. After surpassing the fighting skills of "ordinary people", Yipao soon discovers that Jia Wu Dao is a murderer. When he realises his secret has been revealed, Jia Wu Dao attempts to kill Yipao, but Taipao blocks the fatal blow and is killed in his place.

Yipao escapes and plots how he will avenge his brother's death. He encounters a fat beggar (Sammo Hung) and, impressed by his kung fu, he asks the beggar to become his new kung fu master. After extensive training, the beggar asks Yipao to go and get him some wine. As he is about to return with the wine, Yipao encounters Jia Wu Dao again, and they fight, but Yipao's skill is insufficient. The fat beggar and Yipao then team up, using the monkey style kung fu, against Jia Wu Dao's snake style. As their fight moves outside of the wine shop, the fat beggar and Yipao defeat Jia Wu Dao, killing him with spiked vines, finally avenging Taipao's death. The fat beggar reveals that he is an undercover detective trying to arrest criminals, particularly Jia Wu Dao.

== Cast ==
- Yuen Biao as Yipao / Little John
- Sammo Hung as Fat Beggar / Fatty Beggar / Lt. Fei
- Liang Chia-jen as Dai Pao / Big John
- Lau Kar-wing as Jia Wu Dao / Silver Fox
- Karl Maka as Captain
- Hoi Sang Lee as Painter
- Fo Sing as Tiger
- Chan Lung as Banker Wei
- Louis Lau as Banker Wei's dad
- Chung Fat as Vegetable hawker / Big Eyes

== Box office ==
The domestic Hong Kong theatrical release of Knockabout' ran from 12–25 April 1979, taking HK $2,830,519.

== See also ==
- List of Hong Kong films
- Sammo Hung filmography
- Yuen Biao filmography
