= Chin Tsi-ang =

Hong Kong martial arts actress (1908–2007)

Chin Tsi-Ang
- Born: February 22, 1908; Shanghai, China
- Died: October 15, 2007 (aged 99); Hong Kong
- Other names: Chin Chi-Aau, Mama Hung, Xian Yi-Ying, China chin,
- Years active: 1925–2000
- Spouse: Hung Chung Ho
- Children: 7

Chinese name
- Traditional Chinese: 錢似鶯
- Simplified Chinese: 钱似莺
Transcriptions
Standard Mandarin
- Hanyu Pinyin: Qián Sìyīng

Chin Tsi-Ang (February 22, 1908 – October 15, 2007), also romanized as Qian Siying, was one of the earliest martial arts actors of Chinese cinema and its first female star. She debuted in South China Dream (南华梦, Nanhua Meng) in 1925 at the age of 17 and played a leading role in Southern Heroine (江南女侠, Jiangnan Nüxia) in 1930.

== Biography ==
Born and raised in Shanghai, when Chin was an infant a fortune-teller told her parents that to avoid an early death, she would have to be brought up as a boy. As a result, she was permitted to engage in activities usually reserved for males, although sometimes with her gender disguised. Chin began martial arts training at the age of eight, later going on to perform all her own stunts as well as choreograph scenes. An offer to invest in the new Langhua Movie Studio, made to her father by a close friend and businessman, started Chin's acting career. The studio's first production was to be a martial arts film entitled South China Dream. Her father showed initial enthusiasm until his friend suggested Chin's athletic and attractive daughter would be perfect for a role in it. The elder Chin held a low opinion of actors, but was eventually convinced his daughter might be essential to the new venture's success. South China Dream (later retitled Dreams of Women) was released in two parts, 20 reels total, and box office receipts were good enough to permit the studio to make two more action films in which Chin Tsi-Ang again played important supporting roles.

Chin's supporting roles in Langhua's successful first three movies launched what would become a long movie career. In 1928 she joined the Fudan Film Company, her first role for that studio being the female lead in The Swallow Heroine, after which she starred in three more for Fudan the following year. In 1930 she moved up a level to the Great Wall Film Company, making what would become her representative work, Southern Heroine, directed by Yang Xiaozhong and co-starring Zhang Zhizhi as her villainous adversary. Chin's performance impressed audiences in a film that came out just as Shanghai studios discovered the potential of marketing their product to Southeast Asia's Chinese community; Chin's emerging popularity amongst this group brought a steady stream of theater owners to Shanghai to buy copies of her films, regardless of the cost. She went on to make nine more action films for Great Wall and other studios, and since some of these were multi-parters, the actual number totaled about twice that. The last of these was released in 1931, by which time the fervor for martial arts movies had cooled, so Chin moved into other genres, including sound films.

She married director Hung Chung-Ho, with whom she had seven children (one of her grandchildren is Sammo Hung), and having become a star in Shanghai, they moved to Hong Kong, where they formed the Sanxing Film Company, which specialized in wuxia and produced the first Fong Sai-Yuk film in 1938. The company continued in business until 1963, when the Hong Kong government requisitioned its properties. Chin's husband died not long afterwards, following which she felt the urge to resume making movies, but when the matter of her age (now 53) came up, she replied that she just wanted to make movies again, and would be happy to take "green leaf" roles (bit parts or extras). She specialized in playing women her own age, often the mother or grandmother of a lead character. In this second stage of her career, she worked in more than 180 theatrical films over five decades, one of the more recent being in Wong Kar Wai's In the Mood for Love at age 92.

Chin died in Hong Kong on October 15, 2007 at the age of 99.

== Selected filmography ==
The following is a partial list of films in which Chin played a leading or major supporting role. Due to variations in translation from the Chinese, there are multiple English titles for many of the Chinese films of the classic era.

Shanghai:

- 1925 Dreams of Women, Parts 1 & 2 (originally titled South China Dream)
- 1928 The Swallow Heroine
- 1929 Attack on Golden Snake Mountain
- 1929 This House is Only for Maidens, Parts 1 & 3
- 1929 Burning of Seven Star Mansion, Part 1
- 1929 Three Gates Street
- 1930 Judicious Monks
- 1930 Burning of Seven Star Mansion, Parts 3 & 5
- 1930 Southern Heroine
- 1930 The Yangtze River
- 1930 Evil on Golden Island
- 1930 In Troubled Times
- 1930 Hero on Horseback
- 1930 New Yu Tangchun
- 1931 Legend of the Golden Tower, Parts 1 & 2
- 1931 Male and Female Swords
- 1931 Red Butterfly, Part 3
- 1933 Deep Sorrows
- 1933 Two Orphan Girls
- 1933 Scenes of Shanghai
- 1933 Alladin
- 1933 Bloody Road
- 1934 Bloodstained Peach Blossom
- 1934 New Road
- 1934 Mr. Goodwill

Hong Kong:

- 1941 Eight Heroines
- 1948 God of the Animal Kingdom
