= He Has Nothing But Kung Fu =

1974 Hong Kong film by Lau Kar-wing

- Film poster
- Directed by: Lau Kar-wing
- Written by: Ni Kuang
- Produced by: Lui Ming
- Starring: Gordon Liu; Yung Wang Yu; Chiang Tao; Wilson Tong; Lau Kar-wing
- Cinematography: Li Wan-chieh
- Edited by: Yu Shao-feng
- Music by: Chou Fu-liang
- Production company: Lui Ming (International) Film Enterprises
- Release date: 3 November 1977 (Hong Kong)
- Running time: 91 minutes
- Country: Hong Kong
- Language: Cantonese

He Has Nothing But Kung Fu aka Kung Fu's Deadly Duo (Chinese: 功夫小子) is a 1977 Hong Kong martial arts film directed by Lau Kar-wing and starring Gordon Liu and Wong Yue. It was Lau Kar-wing's first film as a director.

== Plot ==
Yung Wang Yu stars as Sha Shan, a crafty con-artist who uses his wiles to trick money out of the unsuspecting public while also avoiding those he enrages. One particular escapade sees him make a fool out of a local gang member who also loses a considerable amount of money in the process. Unfortunately this sets into motion a series of events which sees the shamed victim sending his vicious gang out to exact revenge and the wily young trickster with no option but to run away. During these events, he also meets a dazed amnesiac (Liu Chia Hui) he proves himself to be a formidable fighter shortly afterwards and helps his new friend out in a few close escapes from the antagonists. The mystery man - who is actually Ka Yuen, the missing son of a wealthy Admiral - uses his exceptional fighting prowess for good, defeating the oppressive enemies while also dragging the hapless Sha Shan along on a mission to rob the evil to give to the poor.

== Cast ==
- Gordon Liu
- Yung Wang Yu
- Chiang Tao
- Wilson Tong
- Lau Kar-wing
- Karl Maka
- Mars
- Lam Ching Ying
- Austin Wai
- Chung Fat
- Mang Hoi
- King Lee
- Hsiao Hou
- Peter Chan
- Hoi Sang Lee
- Baan Yun-Sang
