= New Mr. Vampire =

1987 Hong Kong film by Billy Chan and Leung Chung

- DVD cover
- Traditional Chinese: 殭屍翻生
- Simplified Chinese: 僵尸翻生
- Literal meaning: The Vampire Revived
Transcriptions
Standard Mandarin
- Hanyu Pinyin: Jiāng Shī Fān Shēng
Yue: Cantonese
- Jyutping: Goeng¹ Si¹ Faan¹ Saang¹
- Directed by: Billy Chan
- Written by: Wong Ying
- Produced by: William Cheung Kei
- Starring: Chin Siu-ho; Chung Fat; Lui Fong; Huang Ha; Shum Wai
- Cinematography: Johnny Koo
- Edited by: Cheung Kwok-Kuen
- Music by: Tang Siu-Lam; Michael Lai
- Production companies: Focus Film (H.K.) Co., Ltd.
- Release date: 8 May 1986
- Running time: 84 minutes
- Country: Hong Kong
- Language: Cantonese
- Box office: HK$13,073,563.00

New Mr. Vampire (a.k.a. The New Mr. Vampire) is a 1986 Hong Kong horror film directed by Billy Chan and Leung Chung. It stars Chin Siu-ho (as Hsiao Hau Chien) and Lu Fang (as Tai-Fa) as the disciples and Chung Fat and Huang Ha as the rival masters Chin and Wu.

== Synopsis ==
The brother of a local business baron is killed by a hopping corpse, a creature from Chinese jiangshi fiction. Chin and his disciple set to bury the corpse but their plans are foiled by Wu who allows the corpse to turn into a vampire. Meanwhile, Hsiao in a grave robbery attempt accidentally awakens a female corpse (Wong Siu Fung) who eventually turns out to be the Marshal's (Shum Wai) wife. During the commotion, Wu steals the vampire and sets it loose but is restrained by Chin who transports and hides the vampire in a hotel run by Wu Ma. The Marshal discovers them and his reanimated wife but the vampire is let loose once more by Wu and they all team up with the Marshal and his army to stop it.

== Cast ==
- Chin Siu-ho
- Chung Fat
- Lui Fong
- Huang Ha
- Shum Wai
- Po Tai
- Ku Feng
- Wu Ma
- Sam Wong
- Chan Man-Ching
- Fung Ging-Man
- King Lee
- Baan Yun-Sang
- Wu Jiang
- Wong Yat-Lung

== Box office ==
New Mr. Vampire ran from 8 to 25 May 1986 and grossed HK$13,073,563.00 at the box office.
