= Pantyhose Hero =

1990 Hong Kong film by Sammo Hung

- US film poster
- Traditional Chinese: 脂粉雙雄
- Simplified Chinese: 脂粉双雄
- Hanyu Pinyin: Zhī Fěn Shuāng Xióng
- Jyutping: Zi1 Fan2 Seong1 Hung4
- Directed by: Sammo Hung
- Screenplay by: Barry Wong; Szeto Cheuk-hon
- Produced by: Sammo Hung
- Starring: Sammo Hung; Alan Tam
- Cinematography: Jimmy Leung
- Edited by: Keung Chuen-tak; Peter Cheung
- Music by: Lowell Lo
- Production company: Bojon Films
- Distributed by: Newport Entertainment
- Release date: 8 August 1990
- Running time: 99 minutes
- Country: Hong Kong
- Language: Cantonese
- Box office: HK$15,672,845

Pantyhose Hero (Chinese: 脂粉雙雄) is a 1990 Hong Kong action film starring and directed by Sammo Hung, who also produced. The film co-stars Alan Tam, Joan Tong and Jaclyn Chu.

== Plot ==
While investigating on a serial murder case of homosexual couples, Officer Jeff Lau (Sammo Hung) and his partner Alan (Alan Tam) are sent undercover to pose as homosexual lovers to track the murderer.

== Cast ==
- Sammo Hung as Jeff Lau
- Alan Tam as Alan / Gaykey
- Joan Tong as Chen Chen
- Jaclyn Chu as Inspector Chu Wai-man
- Yam Wai-hung as Boss
- Chung Fat as robber with chainsaw
- Billy Ching as Boss's assistant with orange jacket
- Ridley Tsui as Bartender
- Poon Chan-wai as Dick Cho
- Wu Ma as Commissioner Wu
- Corey Yuen
- Paul Chun as Captain Chan
- Andrew Lam as sushi chef
- Philip Chan as Officer raiding gay bar
- Tai Po as Man killed at construction site
- Lo Kin
- Raymond Lee
- Teddy Yip as Building security
- Siu Tak-foo
- Ricky Lau as taxi driver
- James Tien as Tsen
- Ban Yun-sang as rascal teasing Jeff on street
- Chu Tau as gangster in opening scene
- Mak Wai-cheung as gangster in opening scene
- Chow Kam-kong as gangster in opening scene
- Kong Miu-teng as gangster in opening scene
- Lam Hak-ming as gangster in opening scene
- Wong Chi-ming as thug in final fight scene
- Ha Kwok-wing
- Wong Chi-ceung as rascal teasing Jeff on street
- Choi Kwok-keung
- Fei Kin as thug
- Huang Kai-sen as thug
- Hon Ping as thug

== Box office ==
The film grossed HK$15,672,845 at the Hong Kong box office during its theatrical run from 8 August to 13 September in Hong Kong.

== See also ==
- Sammo Hung filmography
