= Chan Wui-ngai =

Chinese actor, stuntman, director, fight choreographer, and film producer

陳會毅 Chan Wui-ngai
- Born: 6 February 1953 (age 73); Hong Kong
- Occupations: Actor, stuntman, choreography, director, producer
- Awards: Best Action Choreography; 1983 The Prodigal Son; 1984 Winners and Sinners; 1985 Long Arm of the Law

Chinese name
- Traditional Chinese: 陳會毅
- Simplified Chinese: 陈会毅
Transcriptions
Standard Mandarin
- Hanyu Pinyin: Chen Hui Yi
Yue: Cantonese
- Jyutping: Can4 Wui6ngai2

Chan Wui-ngai, (born 6 February 1953; often credited as Billy Chan) is a Hong Kong actor, stuntman, director, fight choreographer, and film producer.

Chan won the 1983 Hong Kong Film Award for Best Action Choreography along with Sammo Hung, Lam Ching-ying and Xia Ling-zhen (Yuen Biao) for his work in The Prodigal Son. In later years, Chan won several more choreography awards.

== Biography ==
Chan was born on 6 February 1953, in Hong Kong. He has a brother named Chan Lung.

== Film career ==
Beginning in 1986, Chan directed 15 movies, beginning with New Mr. Vampire, which won several directing awards. He next directed the film Brotherhood, which starred Ko Chun-hsiung and Chow Yun-fat.
