= Lau Kar-wing =

Chinese director, stunt choreographer and actor

- 劉家榮
- Born: 1944 (age 81–82); Jiangmen, Guangdong, Republic of China
- Other name: Chia-Yung Liu
- Occupations: Actor, director, action choreographer
- Years active: 1964–present
- Children: Lau Wing-kin (son)
- Father: Lau Cham
- Awards: Hong Kong Film Awards – Best Action Choreography; 1991 Once Upon a Time in China

Chinese name
- Traditional Chinese: 劉家榮
- Simplified Chinese: 刘家荣
Transcriptions
Standard Mandarin
- Hanyu Pinyin: Liú Jiārong
Yue: Cantonese
- Jyutping: Lau4 Gaa1 Wing4

Lau Kar-wing (born 1944) is a martial artist, Hong Kong film director, action choreographer and actor.

== Background ==
Born in the Xinhui District of Jiangmen in Guangdong, China, Lau Kar-wing was the fourth child of Lau Cham (劉湛), a martial arts master who studied under Lam Sai-wing, pupil of the legendary Chinese folk hero, Wong Fei-hung.

Lau began learning kung fu in his early teens, learning in secret at his father's school. When his older brother, Lau Kar-leung, discovered this, he began teaching Kar-wing himself.

== Film career ==
Before becoming famous, Lau worked as an extra and choreographer on the black & white Wong Fei-hung films, which starred Kwan Tak-hing as the titular hero. Lau was given his start working under his father and brother in these films, and followed his brother to become a stuntman and assistant choreographer.

In the 1960s he became one of the Shaw Brothers Studio's main action choreographers, working with many directors on films such as King Boxer (1972). Lau evolved to become a director in the late 1970s. By this time he was already an accomplished actor and action choreographer outside of Shaw Brothers.

In the 1970s, Lau formed a partnership with Sammo Hung and Karl Maka. The trio started their own film production company in 1978, Gar Bo Motion Picture Company. They made just two films, before Maka left to start Cinema City. Both films starred Lau, Hung and Maka, Dirty Tiger, Crazy Frog (1978) and Odd Couple (1979). During this period, Lau continued to make films for Shaw Brothers Studio. He moved with the times, in the 1980s he alternated between his own work, and that of Sammo Hung. He also found the time to appear in several of his brother, Lau Kar-leung's films. In 1989, Lau Kar-wing directed City Cops, one of Cynthia Rothrock's most popular films.

During the late 1980s and early 90s, Lau's output slowed down. Since 1994 he has virtually retired from the industry. One of his best known efforts from this period is Skinny Tiger, Fatty Dragon (1990), alongside his old collaborators Sammo Hung and Karl Maka. Kar-wing worked alongside his brother, Kar-leung, as martial arts choreographer on the film Drunken Monkey (2002), and was an uncredited martial arts advisor on Tsui Hark's Seven Swords (2005). Footage of Wing's performance in the 1976 film Tiger & Crane Fists was utilized for the character Wimp Lo in the 2002 American comedy film Kung Pow! Enter the Fist.

Lau is also a skilled lion dance performer, and has demonstrated this ability in at least two films Why Me? (1985) and Once Upon a Time in China and America (1997).

== Personal life ==
Lau is the younger brother of actor, director and action choreographer Lau Kar-leung. Gordon Liu (a.k.a. Lau Kar-fai) is a godson to Lau's parents. He is father to TVB actor Lau Wing-kin. His nephew, Lau Kar-yung (the son of Lau's older sister), is also an actor, action choreographer and director.

== Selected filmography ==
=== As director ===
- He Has Nothing But Kung Fu (1977)
- Dirty Kung Fu (1978)
- Odd Couple (1979)
- Fists and Guts (1979)
- Shaolin Warrior (1980)
- Treasure Hunters (1981)
- Till Death Do We Scare (1982)
- The Fake Ghost Catchers (1982)
- Play Catch (1983)
- Wits of the Brats (1984)
- From the Great Beyond a.k.a. Those Merry Souls (1985)
- Scared Stiff (1987)
- The Dragon Family (1988)
- City Cops (1989)
- Skinny Tiger, Fatty Dragon (1990)
- Innocent Killer (1994)

=== As martial arts choreographer ===
- The Elusive Golden Butterfly (1966)
- The Story of a Discharged Prisoner (1967)
- The Strange Sword (1968)
- Three Young Girls (1968)
- Let's Sing and Dance to Celebrate a Peaceful Year (1969)
- Valley of the Fangs (1970)
- The Young Girl Dares Not Homeward (1970)
- The Heroic Ones (1970)
- The Swift Knight (1971)
- The Oath of Death (1971)
- Young People (1972)
- Water Margin (1972)
- 5 Fingers of Death a.k.a. King Boxer (1972)
- Prodigal Boxer (1972)
- Delightful Forest (1972)
- Boxer from Shantung (1972)
- Black Guide (1973)
- Devil and Angel (1973)
- Death on the Docks (1973)
- The Private Eye (1973)
- The Inheritor of Kung Fu (1973)
- The Mandarin (1973)
- Return of the Assassin (1973)
- The Young Tiger (1973)
- Breakout from Oppression (1973)
- The Escaped Convict (1974)
- The Concrete Jungle (1974)
- The Drug Addict (1974)
- A Mad World of Fools (1974)
- Five Tough Guys (1974)
- The Thunder Kick (1974)
- Five Shaolin Masters (1974)
- Young Lovers on Flying Wheels (1974)
- The Monk (1975)
- The Taxi Driver (1975)
- Master of the Flying Guillotine (1976)
- He Has Nothing But Kung Fu (1977)
- One Arm Chivalry Fights Against One Arm Chivalry (1977)
- Dirty Tiger, Crazy Frog (1978)
- Dirty Kung Fu (1978)
- Odd Couple (1979)
- His Name Is Nobody (1979)
- Fists and Guts (1979)
- Shaolin Warrior (1980)
- Treasure Hunters (1981)
- The Fake Ghost Catchers (1982)
- Aces Go Places 2 (1983)
- Shanghai 13 (1984)
- Prison on Fire (1987)
- Armour of God (1987)
- Return of the Lucky Stars (1989)
- Just Heroes (1989)
- Aces Go Places 5: The Terracotta Hit (1989)
- City Cops (1989)
- Once Upon a Time in China (1991)
- Full Contact (1992)
- Innocent Killer (1994)
- Drunken Monkey (2002)
- Seven Swords (2005) (uncredited)

=== As actor ===
- The Professionals (1967)
- The Thundering Sword (1967)
- King Cat (1967)
- The Black Killer (1967)
- The Sword and the Lute (1967)
- Lady in Distress: The Invincible Fighter (1967)
- The Story of a Discharged Prisoner (1967)
- The Assassin (1967)
- Girl in Red (1967)
- The One-Armed Swordsman (1967)
- Trail of the Broken Blade (1967)
- Red Lamp Shaded in Blood (1968)
- The Magnificent Five (1968)
- The White Dragon (1968)
- Golden Swallow (1968)
- The Silver Fox (1968)
- The Sword of Swords (1968)
- Return of the One-Armed Swordsman (1969)
- Dead End (1969)
- The Oath of Death (1971)
- The Jade Faced Assassin (1971)
- The Swift Knight (1971)
- Hooded Swordsman (1971)
- The Inheritor of Kung Fu (1973)
- Devil and Angel (1973)
- The Devil's Treasure (1973)
- The Mandarin (1973)
- Kung Fu on the Bosphorus (1974)
- The Monk (1975)
- Challenge of the Masters (1976)
- Master of the Flying Guillotine (1976)
- Savage Killers (1976)
- The Good, the Bad and the Loser (1976)
- He Has Nothing But Kung Fu (1977)
- Iron Fists (1977)
- One Arm Chivalry Fights Against One Arm Chivalry (1977)
- The Secret of the Shaolin Poles (1977)
- The 36th Chamber of Shaolin (1978)
- Shaolin Mantis (1978)
- Dirty Kung Fu (1978)
- Warriors Two (1978)
- Dirty Tiger, Crazy Frog (1978)
- Spiritual Boxer II (1979)
- Odd Couple (1979)
- His Name Is Nobody (1979)
- Fists and Guts (1979)
- Knockabout (1979)
- Shaolin Warrior (1980)
- Treasure Hunters (1981)
- Cat vs Rat (1982)
- It Takes Two (1982)
- Legendary Weapons of China (1982)
- Till Death Do We Scare (1982)
- Play Catch (1983)
- Eight-Diagram Pole Fighter (1984)
- My Lucky Stars (1985)
- Twinkle, Twinkle Lucky Stars (1985)
- Millionaire's Express (1986)
- Trouble Couples (1987)
- Tiger on Beat (1988)
- The Dragon Family (1988)
- Return of the Lucky Stars (1989)
- Aces Go Places 5: The Terracotta Hit (1989)
- Skinny Tiger, Fatty Dragon (1990)
- Twin Dragons (1992)
- Innocent Killer (1994)
- Wong Fei Hung Series (1996)
- Once Upon a Time in China and America (1997)
- Fist Power (2000)
- Kung Pow! Enter the Fist (2002, archival footage)
- Anna in Kungfuland (2003)
- Ultimate Fight (2004)
