= Millionaires Express =

1986 Hong Kong film by Sammo Hung

- Hong Kong film poster

Chinese name
- Traditional Chinese: 富貴列車
- Simplified Chinese: 富贵列车
Transcriptions
Standard Mandarin
- Hanyu Pinyin: Fùguì Lièchē
Yue: Cantonese
- Jyutping: Fu^{3}gwai^{3} Lit^{6}ce^{1}
- Directed by: Sammo Hung
- Written by: Sammo Hung; Barry Wong; Keith Wong
- Produced by: Alfred Cheung; Raymond Chow; Leonard Ho; Wu Ma
- Starring: See castlist
- Cinematography: Arthur Wong
- Edited by: Peter Cheung
- Music by: Anders Nelsson; Alastair Monteith-Hodge; Stephen Shing Gam-wing
- Distributed by: Golden Harvest
- Release date: 30 January 1986
- Running time: 101 minutes
- Country: Hong Kong
- Languages: Cantonese; Japanese
- Box office: HK$28.1 million

Millionaires Express (Chinese: 富貴列車; Jyutping: Fu^{3}gwai^{3} Lit^{6}ce^{1}, also known as The Millionaires' Express or Shanghai Express) is a 1986 Hong Kong Western action comedy film co-written, directed by, and starring Sammo Hung. It centers on a disparate group of characters, including rival bandits, con artists, and ninjas, who converge on a rural town where a train carrying many wealthy passengers is stopping.

The film is notable for its large, ensemble cast of well-known performers (many of them in cameo roles), including Hung, Yuen Biao, Rosamund Kwan, Kenny Bee, Peter Chan, Chin Kar-lok, Chin Siu-ho, Hsiao Ho, Hwang Jang-lee, Yasuaki Kurata, Yukari Oshima, Lam Ching-ying, Lau Kar-wing, Richard Ng, Shih Kien, James Tien, Eric Tsang, Cynthia Rothrock, Richard Norton, Yuen Wah, and Jimmy Wang Yu.

Millionaires Express was released by Golden Harvest on January 30, 1986.

== Plot ==
In the Soviet Union, Ching Fong-tin attempts to steal goods from a group of soldiers. They catch him and force him to strip down to his underwear and dance for their amusement. He escapes by stealing the soldiers' grenades and blowing up the cabin with them inside. Ching is immediately caught by government agent Fook Loi, but escapes and retrieves his clothes.

In Ching's home town, policeman Jook Bo and his allies set fire to a large building, as a diversion for a bank robbery. Tsao Cheuk-kin and his fire team race to the scene and save a fat lady and a blind woman. While the fire rages, the criminals rob the bank; two of them are caught and jailed. Mayor Yi gives a negative speech lamenting that there is no chance of recovering the stolen money; in contrast, Tsao encourages the townsfolk, and he is given the job of head of the town's security.

A train along a Shanghai-Chengdu route is due to pass the town, carrying numerous wealthy passengers including Wong Kei-ying and his young son Wong Fei-hung, as well as three Japanese who are in possession of a stolen map showing the location of the Terracotta Army. A group of bandits conspire to steal the map; separately, Jook Bo's criminal group plan to board the train. Ching's ambition is to bring money into the town, so he intends to force the train to stop at the town by blowing up the tracks with dynamite. Ching recruits a group of women, (Note: A scene introducing these characters as prostitutes is present in the 97 minute Hong Kong cut, but omitted from the 101 minute extended ("international") cut of the film.) including Chi and Siu-hon, and they clean up and redress a hotel. When questioned by Tsao, the women claim to be make-up artists. (Note: Scenes in which Tsao questions the women at the hotel, and in which Chi flirts with Tsao, are present in the 101 minute extended cut but are omitted from the 97 minute Hong Kong cut.)

Ching places dynamite at the railway station, but is caught by Tsao; they fight, knocking Tsao out. As the train travels through the country, passenger Han uses the roof to sneak back and forth between his wife and his mistress. Jook Bo's criminals try to board the train, using magnets, a lasso, and a cart. When the train reaches the station, Ching blows the dynamite, derailing the train.

As Ching had planned, the passengers spend time in his home town awaiting the train's repair. In the hotel, the criminals seeking the map attempt to occupy the room housing Han's mistress, in order to spy on the three Japanese in the room next door. The criminals don't know the language, and are forced to hide when the train captain and his mistress enter the room. Han enters the room via the hotel roof, inadvertently scaring the train captain's mistress. The commotion alerts his wife, who accuses him of cheating. To explain the situation, Han claims that he is actually an agent spying on the Japanese, which prompts the criminals to emerge from hiding and share the same excuse.

Fook Loi returns from the Soviet Union and uses Tsao to capture Ching and put him into jail. At night, Siu-hon and her group of ladies free Ching. An army of bandits arrives on horseback, storming the town and capturing the Japanese and other passengers.

Ching returns to town and frees Fook, Tsao, Siu-hon and her women, and Jook Bo and his criminals from jail. Ching and Fook attack the bandits with a multiple-barrel firearm, while their allies free the Japanese and the other train passengers. A huge fight breaks out, until the bandits are dealt with and Ching and Tsao finally take back the map from the Japanese.

== Cast ==
- Sammo Hung as Ching Fong-tin
- Yuen Biao as Fire Chief Tsao Cheuk-kin
- Rosamund Kwan as Chi
- Kenny Bee as Fook Loi
- Peter Chan as Firefighter / Security Officer
- Olivia Cheng as Siu-hon
- Chin Kar-lok as Firefighter / Security Officer
- Chin Siu Ho as Siu Cheung
- Emily Chu as Bo
- Chung Fat as Mountain Bandit
- Fan Mei-sheng as Mountain Bandit
- Hsiao Ho as Siu Hau
- Hwang Jang-lee as Yukio Fushiki
- Yasuaki Kurata as Male Ninja
- Yukari Ôshima as Female Ninja
- Phillip Ko as Mountain Bandit
- Lam Ching-ying as Security Officer / Bank Robber
- Billy Lau as Train Captain
- Lau Kar-wing as Kang
- Mang Hoi as Security Officer / Convict / Bank Robber
- Richard Ng as Han
- Lydia Shum as Han's Wife
- Richard Norton as Male Russian Bandit
- Cynthia Rothrock as Female Russian Bandit
- Shih Kien as Master Sek
- James Tien as Yun Shiyu
- Eric Tsang as Jook Bo
- Jimmy Wang Yu as Master Wong Kei-ying
- Dick Wei as Mountain Bandit
- Woo Fung as Mayor Yi
- Wu Ma as Security Officer / Convict / Bank Robber
- Bolo Yeung as Cotton Weaver
- Teresa Ha as Cotton Weaver's Wife
- Yuen Wah as Security Officer / Convict
- Johnny Wang as Train Robber
- Cho Tat-wah as Shanghai Chief Inspector

== Release ==
Millionaires Express was released in Hong Kong on 30 January 1986. In the Philippines, the film was released as China Warriors by Asia Films on 2 August 1987, rated "G" by the Movie and Television Review and Classification Board.

=== Home media ===
The film was initially released on DVD in Hong Kong by Universe Laser (Region 0). It was re-released in 2006 by Joy Sales (Region 3).

In the US it was released in 1999 by Tai Seng, under the title The Millionaires Express (with a leading "The"). It was re-released in 2007 by Dragon Dynasty under the title Shanghai Express.

In the UK it was released in 2005 by Hong Kong Legends / Contender Entertainment Group, under its original title.

In July 2021, Eureka Entertainment released the film on Blu-ray in the United Kingdom, under the title The Millionaires' Express, as a two-disc set containing the 97 minute Hong Kong theatrical cut, the 101 minute extended version (a.k.a. the "international" cut), the 92 minute English export cut, and a new 109 minute "hybrid" cut. In September 2022, Eureka released a single-disc edition containing only the former two cuts of the film.

== See also ==
- List of Hong Kong films
- Sammo Hung filmography
- Yuen Biao filmography
