= Pom Pom (film) =

1984 Hong Kong film by Joe Cheung

- Film poster
- Directed by: Joe Cheung
- Written by: Bo Ho Writing Team
- Produced by: Sammo Hung
- Starring: Richard Ng; John Shum; Deannie Yip; Philip Chan
- Cinematography: Ricky Lau Jun Wei
- Edited by: Peter Cheung Yiu Chung
- Music by: Lam Miu-Tak
- Distributed by: Golden Harvest; Bo Ho Film Company Limited
- Release date: 22 February 1984
- Running time: 100 minutes
- Country: Hong Kong
- Language: Cantonese
- Box office: HK $20,170,382

Pom Pom (神勇雙響炮; lit. "Supernaturally brave artillery") is a 1984 Hong Kong action comedy film directed by Joe Cheung. It is the first in a series of four Pom Pom films starring Richard Ng and John Shum.

The title of the film is the onomatopoeic representation of a gunshot sound. The title is sometimes suffixed with an exclamation mark as Pom Pom! and the alternate Hong Kong English title for the film is Boom Boom!

The film is something of a spinoff of Sammo Hung's Lucky Stars films, and Hung produced Pom Pom and released the film through his Bo Ho Films production company. Ng and Shum had been two of the original quintet of Lucky Stars in the film Winners and Sinners and their co-stars in that film, Hung, Charlie Chin and Stanley Fung make cameo appearances in Pom Pom as their characters from My Lucky Stars, released in the following year.

Jackie Chan and Yuen Biao, who had appeared in the original Lucky Stars trilogy also made cameo appearances as a motorcycle cop and truck driver respectively. The film also features appearances from several of their Hong Kong action film contemporaries, including Deanie Yip, Lam Ching Ying, Philip Chan, Dick Wei and Wu Ma.

== Plot ==
Ah Chau (Richard Ng) and Beethoven (John Shum) are a pair of cops investigating a drug lord, but their ineptitude threatens to derail the case. The police are well aware that Mr Sha (Chan Lung) is the boss of the crime syndicate smuggling and trafficking in drugs, and that he keeps details of his criminal transactions in a book which is kept by his mistress.

When Beethoven and Ah Chau investigate, they find Sha's mistress dead, and inadvertently compromise all fingerprint evidence in the hideout. Luckily, they are assisted by beautiful cop Inspector Anna (Deannie Yip), who is secretly attracted to Ah Chau. Finally the two make their arrests and become instant heroes.

== Cast and roles ==
- Richard Ng - Ah Chau (sometimes listed Achioo) as / Walker / Ng Ah Chiu
- John Shum - Beethoven / Johnny
- Deannie Yip - Anna
- Philip Chan - Inspector C.K. Chan
- Tai Po - Pimp Chou Wen
- Chung Fat - Columbo
- James Tien - Chief Inspector Tien
- Peter Chan - Mr. Sha
- Wu Ma - Police Station Employee / Painter
- Dennis Chan - Police Station Employee / Painter
- Kan Ng Min - Keung
- Kit Lee Chi - Pui
- Dick Wei - Scarman
- Yuen Biao - Garbage Truck Driver
- Sammo Hung - Eric / Kidstuff / Chi Koo Choi (Cameo appearance)
- Stanley Fung - Rawhide (Cameo appearance)
- Charlie Chin - Herb (Cameo appearance)
- Mars - Motorcycle Cop #1
- Jackie Chan - Motorcycle Cop #2 / Skater
- Lam Ching-ying - Police Sergeant
- Lau Chau Sang - Mr. Sha's Thug
- Johnny Cheung - Mr. Sha's Thug
- Steve Mak - Mr. Sha's Thug
- Chin Kar-lok - Mr. Sha's Thug
- Pang Yun-Cheung - Mr. Sha's Thug
- Wellson Chin - Police Station Employee
- Chin Yuet Sang - Passenger in stalled car
- Chong Man Ching - Driver of stalled car
- Fung Ging Man - Mahjong player
- Tai San - Bill

== Sequels ==
Pom Pom was followed by 3 sequels:

- The Return of Pom Pom (雙龍出海) (1984)
- Mr. Boo Meets Pom Pom (智勇三寶) (1985)
- Pom Pom Strikes Back (雙龍吐珠) (1986)
