= Enter the Fat Dragon (1978 film) =

1978 Hong Kong film by Sammo Hung

- Japanese film poster

Chinese name
- Traditional Chinese: 肥龍過江
- Simplified Chinese: 肥龙过江
Transcriptions
Standard Mandarin
- Hanyu Pinyin: Féi Lóng Guò Jiāng
Yue: Cantonese
- Jyutping: Fei4 Lung4 Gwo3 Gong1
- Directed by: Sammo Hung
- Written by: Ni Kuang
- Produced by: Florence Yu
- Starring: Sammo Hung; Lee Hye-sook; Ankie Lau; Luk Chu-sek; Bryan Leung
- Cinematography: Ricky Lau
- Edited by: Cheung Kwok-kuen
- Music by: Frankie Chan
- Production company: Fung Ming Motion Picture
- Release date: 13 July 1978
- Running time: 100 minutes
- Country: Hong Kong
- Language: Cantonese

Enter the Fat Dragon (Chinese: 肥龍過江) is a 1978 Hong Kong martial arts film starring and directed by Sammo Hung. The film is mostly a parody of the Bruce Lee film Way of the Dragon (1972), and a satire of the Bruceploitation phenomenon of the 1970s. Its English title references another Bruce Lee film, Enter the Dragon (1973).

The film had a belated video release in the United States, eventually coming out in 1999 after Hung became an unexpected success with his American TV series Martial Law.

In November 2017, it was announced that Donnie Yen would star in a remake of the film, directed by Kenji Tanigaki and Aman Chang. The film was released in 2020, but was not a remake.

== Plot ==
Ah Lung is a pig farmer and a devoted Bruce Lee fan who is anxious to follow in Lee's footsteps, but only ridiculed for his attempts because of his weight. He is sent to the city to earn a living working at his uncle's restaurant, but when he arrives, he finds a gang of thugs causing trouble in the restaurant. He takes the chance to prove himself and attacks the thugs, defeating them and saving the restaurant. Soon, he becomes a waiter, and discovers a plot by the same thugs to kidnap a woman he works with. Eventually, he defeats the thugs once again and saves the day.

== Cast ==
Actor	Role
Sammo Hung	Ah Lung
Lee Hye-sook	Chen
Ankie Lau	Siu-wai
Luk Chu-sek	Ko
Bryan Leung	Bearded Fighter
Peter Yang	Professor Bak / Bai
Roy Chiao	Chiu
Meg Lam	Baat Je
Pan Yung-sheng	Fighter in Opening Credit Sequence
Yuen Biao	Fighter in Opening Credit Sequence
Billy Chan	Thug/Action Movie Fighter
Chung Fat	Fighter in Opening Credit Sequence
Johnny Cheung	Fighter at party
Lam Ching-ying	Action film fighter
Chik Ngai-hung	Robber
Chin Yuet-sang	
Fung Fung	Uncle Hung
Fung King-man	Spectacles vendor
Fung Hak-on	Gene
Hoi Sang Lee	Karate Thug
King Lee	Party fighter
Tony Leung Siu-hung	Tseng Hsiao-lung
Chiu Chi-ling	
Lam Hak-ming	Thug
Lau Chau-sang	
Mang Hoi	Fighter in Opening Credit Sequence
Mars	Fighter in Opening Credit Sequence
Sai Gwa-Pau	Stutterer on bus
Eric Tsang	Party Host's Son
Wong Chi-keung	Fighter at party
Huang Ha	Movie Director
David Nick	Boxing Thug
Yeung Wai	Baate Je's husband

== Home video releases ==
In 1999, Crash Cinema released Enter the Fat Dragon on DVD in the US in a non-anamorphic widescreen transfer from a battered 35mm release print with burned-in English subtitles. The print Crash Cinema used was missing around three minutes of footage from the final fight scenes.

In 2019, Thunderfist Productions released a newly restored version of it on Blu-ray and DVD in Germany under the title Der kleine Dicke mit dem Superschlag ("The Little Fat One with the Super Punch"). Four different mediabook Blu-ray/DVD combo designs and a standard Blu-ray were issued. Three different cuts of the film are included: the restored international export theatrical version, the reconstructed full-length Hong Kong theatrical version, and the German theatrical version. The restored export version is the main presentation and contains the fight footage missing from the Crash Cinema DVD, but is missing the comedic bus horse race radio broadcast scene near the beginning and a couple of other comedy bits from later on in the film. This version runs 91 minutes and features the original Cantonese mono soundtrack as well as the original English and German dubs, plus English subtitles. The reconstructed full-length Hong Kong version takes the missing comedy bits and the original Chinese opening credits sequence from the Crash Cinema DVD and drops them into the restored export cut. This version runs 96 minutes and features the original Cantonese mono soundtrack with removable English subtitles for the bulk of the film and burned-in subtitles for the bits that had to be sourced from the Crash DVD. The German theatrical version is cut down from the restored export version to match the original German theatrical release, runs 82 minutes, and features the German dub only. Extras include the original Hong Kong trailer in Cantonese with English subtitles, the original international trailer dubbed in German, a photo gallery of German posters and lobby cards, and a commentary track for the main export version by the Podcast On Fire crew (Stewart Sutherland, Mike Leeder, and Kenneth Brorsson). Mediabook editions include a booklet with photos and German text.

== See also ==
- List of Hong Kong films
