= Spooky, Spooky =

1988 Hong Kong film by Sammo Hung

- Film poster
- Directed by: Sammo Hung
- Written by: Szeto Cheuk-hon
- Produced by: Sammo Hung
- Music by: Alastair Monteith-Hodge; Anders Nelsson
- Production companies: Bojon Films Co., Ltd. Golden Harvest Company; Paragon Films Ltd.
- Distributed by: Golden Harvest Company
- Release date: 19 October 1988
- Running time: 95 minutes
- Country: Hong Kong
- Language: Cantonese
- Box office: HK $11,485,775

Spooky, Spooky (Chinese: 鬼掹腳 Gui meng jiao, literally: "Come Join Us"), also known as The Haunted Island and Spooky, Spooky, Spooky, is a 1988 Hong Kong comedy horror film directed and produced by Sammo Hung. The executive producer was Leonard Ho. The film was released theatrically on 19 October 1988.

== Plot ==
In the time of the Qing dynasty, a woman is caught in an adulterous embrace with a man. The man is drowned in a cage while the grieving woman falls into a pit of quicksand and dies. Years later in 1988, recent police academy graduate Wang Hsiao Ming is newly posted as a policeman in West Bay, also known as "Ghost Bay", under Sectional Chief Lu Hsien, nicknamed "Master" due to his old age. During his first morning on the job, the duo are called to investigate a woman's corpse that has washed ashore. They are joined by new posting Chief Inspector Chen. Chief Coroner Chen Ta-wen, also known as "Queency", suggests that they get help from the larger East Bay police department.

Hsiao Ming attempts to raise the red flag to prevent beachgoers from entering the water, causing an uproar among the locals. New posting Sgt. Pai arrives with a stern attitude, slapping Hsiao Ming when he tells her to help him raise the red flag. The ghost of the dead woman develops feelings for Hsiao Ming and slaps Sgt. Pai out of vengeance.

Hsiao Ming's old neighbor Miss Wang, a schoolteacher, has brought her class to the beach. Unable to enter the water, they instead create a time capsule. The student "Fatty" enters the water and goes missing, causing panic among the other students. The ghost of the dead woman possesses Miss Wang and battles Sgt. Pai. The fight is broken up by Hsiao Ming and Lu Hsien, who then shoots the ghost with vermillion bullets when she attacks him.

As Queency leads Hsiao Ming, Lu Hsien, and Sgt. Pai on a search for clues, the ghost possesses Chief Inspector Chen. Lu Hsien stops the ghost from moving with a charm written on joss paper. They transport Chief Inspector Chen's body to the East Bay Police Station, where the ghost possesses policemen there and ultimately Hsiao Ming himself.

== Cast ==
- Alfred Cheung as Wang Hsiao Ming
- Wu Ma as Lu Hsien
- Joyce Godenzi as Sgt. Pai
- Fat Cheung as Chen Ta-wen a.k.a. Queency
- Anthony Chan as Chief Inspector Chen
- Tina Lau as Miss Wang
- Richard Ng as East Bay Station Commander
- Yuen Wah as East Bay Sergeant
- Mars as Mars
- Billy Lau as Four Eyes
- Corey Yuen as Egghead
- Pauline Yuk-Wan Wong as Quicksand Ghost
- Yip Wing-cho as Village Head
- Hui Ying-ying as Villager
- Yu Mo-lin as Villager
- Yuen Woo-ping as Villager
- Kwan Shiu-leung as Fatty
- Sabrina Ho Pui-Yi as Student
- James Tien as Master Tien

== Reception ==
The website sogoodreviews.com calls the film "a Sammo Hung effort with ambitions to provide actual horror and tension, in addition to the comedy" and adds that "the movie is very funny when needed."

Reviewer MovieMadness gave the film a rating of 7/10, calling it "a typical 1980s HK ghost vehicle" with "entertaining lively horror and slapstick".

Topo Sanchez of scumcinema.com included the film in his list of "Top 10 Hong Kong Horror Classics on YouTube".
