= Odd Couple (1979 film) =

1979 Hong Kong film by Lau Kar-wing

- Theatrical poster
- Directed by: Lau Kar-wing
- Written by: Wong Pak Ming; Lai Wai Man
- Produced by: Karl Maka
- Starring: Sammo Hung; Lau Kar-wing; Bryan Leung; Dean Shek; Mars
- Cinematography: Ho Ming
- Edited by: Tony Chow
- Music by: Kung Chuan Kai; Hoh Koo
- Distributed by: Gar Bo Motion Picture Company
- Release date: 9 August 1979
- Running time: 97 minutes
- Country: Hong Kong
- Language: Cantonese

Odd Couple (Chinese: 搏命單刀奪命搶) is a 1979 Hong Kong martial arts comedy film directed by Lau Kar-wing. The film stars Sammo Hung, Bryan Leung, and Dean Shek. It was the first film to be released by Gar Bo Motion Picture Company (a.k.a. Gar-Bo Film Company), an independent production company set up by Hung, Lau and producer Karl Maka. The fight scenes are mainly weapon-based, with particular emphasis on the contrast between the dao (sword) and qiang (spear).

The film is sometimes listed as The Odd Couple, Dance of Death or The Eternal Conflict.

The film initially focuses on two rival martial artists who have a tradition of annual duels with each other, in a futile attempt to decide which one is the best. All of their duels were inconclusive. Facing the effects of old age, the two rivals decide to train replacements to continue their annual tradition. A common foe of the duo decides to use their students in a revenge scheme against the aging masters. The masters' own pride prevents them from co-operating against their shared enemy.

== Plot ==
The film is set during the reign of the Qing dynasty. Two aging martial artists get together once a year for a timed duel. One is master of the short sword, King of Sabres (Sammo Hung), and the other is King of Spears (Lau Kar-wing). Every year the fight ends in a draw, and as the masters are getting old, they decide the best course of action is to each take on a student to determine who is the better teacher. They agree to meet up again 10 years later, with their students and let the next generation carry on the duel.

A previously upright martial artist known as Old Yellow Dog (Bryan Leung) kidnaps the students (also played by Lau and Hung) before their duel can begin. It transpires in a flashback that the master was defeated in separate battles with the King of Sabres and the King of Spears, and was forced to retire from fighting. Now, after years of training in the long bladed staff and with a new name, Laughing Bandit, he wants to lure the old masters out to exact his revenge.

The old masters arrive, first taking on the Laughing Bandit's four disciples and killing them. However, this was a ploy to tire them out, and individually they are unable to defeat Laughing Bandit and his new techniques. The evil master suggests the old men both attack at once, but because of their pride and belief in their own superiority, they refuse. The students are released, while each master is fighting, and are instructed to escape. After some protestation they do, and the old masters are killed.

Fuelled by revenge, the students agree to join forces to defeat the evil master. Hung's character (the new King of Spears) comes up with a plan us to use magnets that can pull the Laughing Bandit's weapon from him. After luring him out into the open, they fight him unarmed, choosing to mimic their weapon styles with empty hands, but with the magnet they are able to disrupt his attacks, and after a gruelling fight they triumph. They kill the evil master.

After burying their masters, they decide to honour their memory by fulfilling their request to duel. However, as with their masters before them, the fight ends in a draw. Instead, they decide to resolve who is the greatest by playing a game, rather than fighting. Each must try to place his weapon into their masters burial mound, whilst simultaneously stopping their opponent from doing so. After another long competition, the film ends with the pair laughing at the absurdity of the rivalry and realising that as friends they will never be able to determine who is the best.

== Cast ==
- Sammo Hung as King of Sabres / Ah Yo (2 roles)
- Lau Kar-wing as King of Spears / Stubborn Wing (2 roles) (as Kar Wing Lau)
- Bryan Leung as Laughing Bandit a.k.a. Old Yellow Dog / Scarface (as Kar Yan Leung)
- Mars as Potato
- Dean Shek as Master Rocking / Playboy
- Billy Chan as Humpback / Tien (2 roles)
- Lam Ching-ying as Ha (Laughing Bandit's fighter)
- Yuen Miu as Mo (Laughing Bandit's fighter)
- Chung Fat as Ti (Laughing Bandit's fighter)
- Huang Ha as Single Sabre Wu Li
- Yeung Sai Gwan as Tiger Spear
- Peter Chan Lung as Pak Chow / Cloud Sabre
- Karl Maka as Cloud Sabre's challenge
- Ho Pak Kwong as Master Rocking's assistant
- Tai San as Master Rocking's assistant
- Chan Ling Wai as Master Rocking's assistant
- Hoi Sang Lee as Thug
- Cheung Chok Chow as Tea house boss
- Benny Lai as Extra
- Yuen Biao as Stunt Double

== Production ==
In the film, Sammo Hung and Lau Kar-wing play two roles each, a master and a student. Hung plays the King of Sabres and his student is played by Lau, and Lau plays the King of Spears and his student is played by Hung. In the later part of the film, all 'four' characters appear in scenes together. Both students become proficient in their weapons, allowing the actors, in their opposing roles, to demonstrate their skills with both weapons.
