= The Trail =

2024 Austrian science fiction horror film

- Der Pfad
- Directed by: Stefan Müller
- Screenplay by: Stefan Müller; Martin Kroissenbrunner
- Produced by: Oliver Haas; Stefan Müller
- Starring: Sophia Grabner; Corinna Pumm; Paul Hassler; Julia Foidl; Stefan Schnuderl; Oliver Haas
- Cinematography: Stefan Müller
- Edited by: Stefan Müller
- Music by: Ryan Taubert; Michael Vignola
- Production companies: Loom; Fly Oli GmbH
- Distributed by: Fly Oli
- Release date: 24 October 2024
- Running time: 80 minutes
- Country: Austria
- Language: German

The Trail (German: Der Pfad) is a 2024 Austrian science fiction horror film written and directed by Stefan Müller. The film stars Sophia Grabner as a traumatised woman who sets out on a solitary hike in the Alps and encounters an alien threat.

== Plot ==
After a lengthy hospital stay, Anna hikes alone through a remote mountain landscape to confront her trauma and fears. She notices signs of an unexplained incident in the wilderness, and the trek turns into a fight for survival when an otherworldly presence intrudes on the trail.

== Cast ==
- Sophia Grabner as Anna
- Corinna Pumm as Sophia's mother
- Julia Foidl as Sophia
- Oliver Haas as Sophia's father
- Paul Hassler as Hiker No. 1
- Stefan Schnuderl as Stranger

== Production ==
Müller co-wrote the screenplay with Martin Kroissenbrunner and also served as the film's cinematographer and editor. Principal photography took place largely in Styria, including forest and mountain locations.

== Release ==
The Trail opened in Austrian cinemas on 24 October 2024. In September 2025, the Film Commission Graz announced that the film had become available on Amazon Prime Video in over 15 countries.

== Reception ==
In its 2025 VOD review, L’Écran Fantastique judged the film uneven but praised its staging and alpine landscapes, noting its near-silent approach aside from vocalisations and sound effects. Writing for Spielemagazin.de, the reviewer emphasised the film's minimal dialogue and focus on atmosphere and imagery, calling it an unusual Austrian genre entry blending nature observation with science-fiction horror elements.
