= Sammo Hung =

Hong Kong actor and martial artist (born 1952)

- 洪金寶
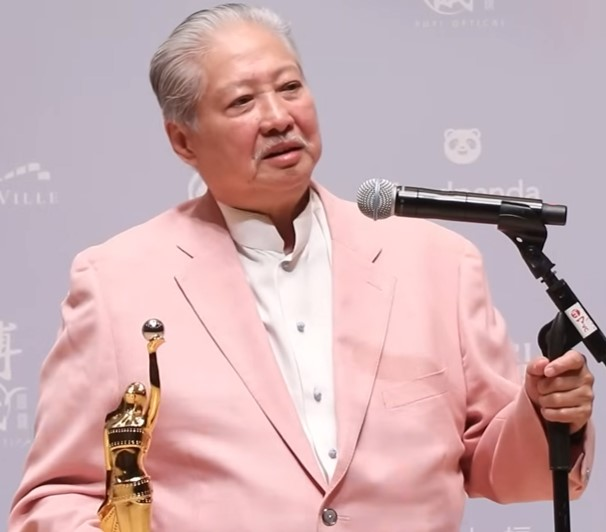
- Hung in 2024
- Born: Hung Kam-bo; 7 January 1952 (age 74); British Hong Kong
- Other names: Dai Goh Dai (大哥大); Yuen Lung (元龍); Chu Yuen Lung (朱元龍)
- Occupations: Martial artist; actor; director; choreographer; producer; playwright
- Years active: 1961–present
- Spouses: Jo Eun-ok (m. 1973; div. 1994) Joyce Godenzi (m. 1995)
- Children: Timmy Hung (son); Jimmy Hung (son); Sammy Hung (son); Stephanie Hung (daughter)
- Relatives: Chin Tsi-ang (grandmother); Hung Chung-ho (grandfather)
- Family: Lee Chi-kit (brother)
- Awards: Asia-Pacific Film Festival – Best Actor; 1988 Painted Faces Hong Kong Film Awards – Best Actor; 1983 Carry On Pickpocket; 1989 Painted Faces; Best Action Choreography; 1983 The Prodigal Son; 2009 Ip Man; 2011 Ip Man 2; 2018 Paradox; Lifetime Achievement; 2024 Asian Film Awards – Best Supporting Actor; 2011 Ip Man 2 Golden Horse Awards – Best Action Choreography; 2009 Ip Man; 2010 Ip Man 2

Chinese name
- Traditional Chinese: 洪金寶
- Simplified Chinese: 洪金宝
Transcriptions
Standard Mandarin
- Hanyu Pinyin: Hóng Jīnbǎo
Yue: Cantonese
- Jyutping: Hung4 Gam1-bou2

Signature
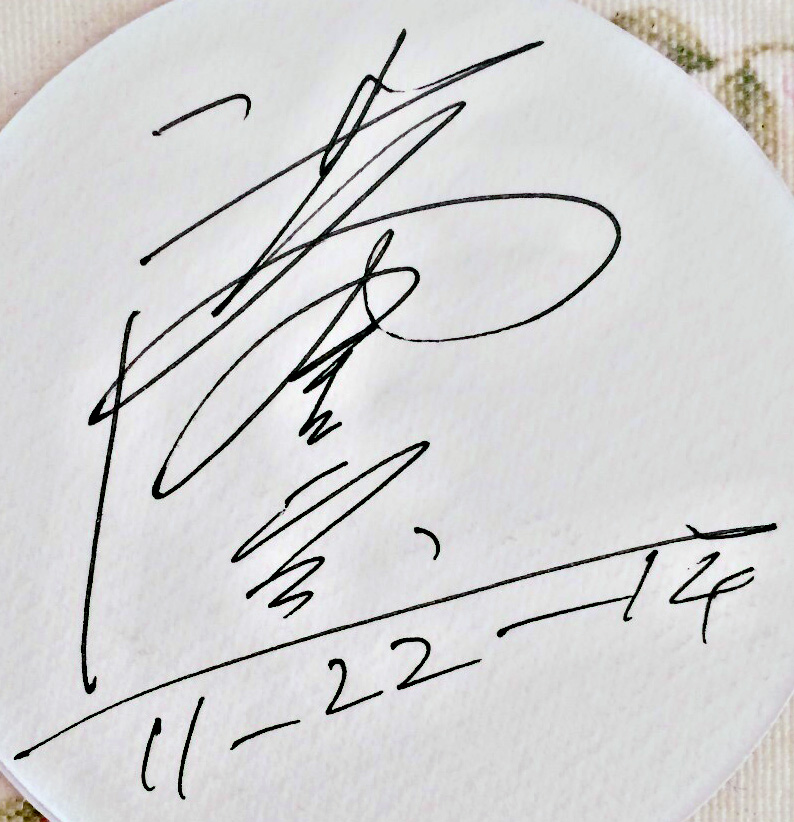

Sammo Hung Kam-bo (Chinese: 洪金寶; Jyutping: Hung^{4} Gam^{1}-bou^{2}; born 7 January 1952) is a Hong Kong actor, martial artist, and filmmaker, known for his work in martial arts films, Hong Kong action cinema, and as a fight choreographer for other actors such as Kim Tai-chung, Jackie Chan, Yuen Biao, and Yuen Wah.

Hung is one of the pivotal figures who spearheaded the Hong Kong New Wave movement of the 1980s, helped reinvent the martial arts genre and popularized the zombie-like jiangshi genre. He is widely credited with assisting many of his compatriots, giving them their starts in the Hong Kong film industry, by casting them in the films he produced, or giving them roles in the production crew.

Both Sammo Hung and Jackie Chan were often addressed as "Dai Goh", meaning "Big Brother", until the filming of Project A (1983), which featured both actors. As Hung was the eldest of the kung fu "brothers", and the first to make a mark on the industry, he was given the nickname "Dai Goh Dai", meaning "Big, Big Brother", or "Biggest Big Brother".

== Early years ==
Born in Hong Kong, both of his parents worked as wardrobe artists in the local film industry and guardianship was thrust upon his grandparents. His grandmother was archetypal martial art actress Chin Tsi-ang and his grandfather was film director Hung Chung-ho.

Hung joined the China Drama Academy, a Peking Opera School in Hong Kong, in 1961. He was enrolled for a period of seven years, beginning at the age of 9, after his grandparents heard about the school from their friends. The opera school was run by Master Yu Jim Yuen and as was customary for all students, Hung adopted the given name of his sifu as his family name whilst attending. Going by the name Yuen Lung (元龍), Hung became the foremost member of the Seven Little Fortunes (七小福) performing group, and would establish a friendly rivalry with one of the younger students, Yuen Lo. Yuen Lo would go on to become international superstar Jackie Chan. At the age of 14, Hung was selected by a teacher who had connections to the Hong Kong film industry to perform stunts on a movie. This brief foray into the industry piqued his interest in film and he took particular interest in the operation of film cameras. As the eldest of the troupe, Hung would give his opera school brothers pocket money from his earnings, endearing him greatly to his young friends. Shortly before leaving the Academy at the age of 16, Hung suffered an injury that left him bedridden for an extended period, during which time his weight ballooned. After finding work in the film industry as a stuntman, he was given a nickname after a well-known Chinese cartoon character, Sam-mo (三毛; Three Hairs).

Many years later, in 1988, Hung starred in Alex Law's Painted Faces, a dramatic re-telling of his experiences at the China Drama Academy. Among the exercises featured in the film are numerous acrobatic backflips, and hours of handstands performed against a wall. Despite some of the more brutal exercises and physical punishments shown in Painted Faces, Hung and the rest of the Seven Little Fortunes consider the film a toned-down version of their actual experiences.

== Film career ==
=== 1960s and 1970s ===
Hung appeared as a child actor in several films for Cathay Asia and Bo Bo Films during the early 1960s. His film debut was in the 1961 film Education of Love. In 1962, he made his first appearance alongside Jackie Chan in the film Big and Little Wong Tin Bar, followed by a role in The Birth of Yue Fei, in which he played the ten-year-old Yue Fei, the historical figure from the Song Dynasty who would go on to become a famous Chinese general and martyr. The majority of Hung's performance was alongside another actor portraying Zhou Tong, Yue's elderly military arts tutor. In 1966, at the age of just 14, Hung began working for Shaw Brothers Studio, assisting the action director Han Yingjie, on King Hu's film Come Drink with Me thanks to the fact that Han was his master's son-in-law. Between 1966 and 1974, Hung worked on dozens of films for Shaw Brothers, their two main rivals Golden Harvest and Cathay, as well as numerous independent production companies, progressing through the roles of extra, stuntman, stunt co-ordinator and ultimately, action director.

In 1970, Hung began working for Raymond Chow and the Golden Harvest film company. He was initially hired to assist Han Yingjie in choreographing the action scenes for the very first two Golden Harvest films, The Invincible Eight and The Angry River. Golden Harvest sent Hung to Korea to choreograph films with their director Huang Feng where Hung studied hapkido with Master Ji Han-Jae and earned his black belt. While in Korea he became the martial arts director on three Angela Mao vehicles, Lady Whirlwind, Hapkido, and When Taekwondo Strikes. His popularity soon began to grow, and due to the quality of his choreography and disciplined approach to his work, he again caught the eye of celebrated Taiwanese director, King Hu. Hung choreographed Hu's The Fate of Lee Khan (1973).

Also in 1973, he was seen in the Bruce Lee classic Enter the Dragon. Hung was the Shaolin student Lee faces in the opening sequence. In 1975, Hung choreographed the action for The Man from Hong Kong, the first Australian co-production undertaken by Golden Harvest.

In the mid-70s, martial arts movies began to lose some of their punch at the box office and Golden Harvest signed the Hui Brothers to a contract. Michael, Ricky, and Sam Hui had been at Shaw Brothers but wanted to direct their own movies. When Shaw refused they signed with Golden Harvest and their blockbuster comedies kicked off a comedy wave in Hong Kong. When it came time to direct his first film, The Iron Fisted Monk (1977), Hung made sure to lean into the comedy, delivering what many feel to be the first out-and-out kung fu comedy film.

In 1978, Raymond Chow gave Hung the task of completing the fight co-ordination for the re-shoot of Game of Death, the film Bruce Lee was unable to complete before his death in 1973.

In 1978, Hung directed his second film, the comedy Enter the Fat Dragon, for H.K. Fong Ming Motion Picture Company, also playing the lead role Ah Lung; a character who idolises and impersonates Bruce Lee. Hung has impersonated Lee on film twice more - in the final fight scene against Cynthia Rothrock in Millionaire's Express (1986), and throughout the 1990 Lau Kar-wing film Skinny Tiger, Fatty Dragon.

After Jackie Chan's success with Drunken Master (1978), Hung was scheduled to make a similar film featuring Drunken Master's "Beggar So" character played by Yuen Siu Tien (aka Simon Yuen). As his elder, Sammo's films were expected to surpass Chan's in popularity. The film was The Magnificent Butcher (1979), which Hung co-directed with Yuen Woo-ping. However, during filming Yuen Siu Tien died of a heart attack. He was replaced by Fan Mei Sheng and Yuen's absence may have led to low ticket sales.

=== 1980s ===
As Hung's fame grew, he used his newly found influence to assist his former China Drama Academy classmates, as well as the former students of "rival" school The Spring and Autumn Drama School. Aside from regular collaborations with Chan, others such as Yuen Biao, Yuen Wah, Lam Ching-ying and Mang Hoi also began to make regular appearances in his films.

In 1978 and 1981, Hung made two films that contain fine examples of the Wing Chun style. The first, Warriors Two, was the most significant role to date for South Korean super kicker Casanova Wong, who teamed up with Hung in the final fight. The second film was The Prodigal Son, in which the Wing Chun fighting was performed by Lam Ching-Ying. The release of The Prodigal Son, along with another film directed by and co-starring Hung, Knockabout (1979), also elevated his fellow Opera schoolmate Yuen Biao to stardom.

Hung's martial arts films of the 1980s helped reconfigure how martial arts were presented on screen. While the martial arts films of the 1970s generally featured highly stylised fighting sequences in period or fantasy settings, Hung's choreography, set in modern urban areas, was more realistic and frenetic - featuring long one-on-one fight scenes. The fight sequences from several of these films, such as those in Winners and Sinners (1983) and Wheels on Meals (1984) came to define 1980s martial arts movies.

In 1983, the collaboration between the triumvirate of Hung, Jackie Chan, and Yuen Biao began with Chan's Project A. Hung, Chan and Yuen were known as the 'Three Dragons' and their alliance lasted for 5 years. Although Yuen continued to appear in the films of Hung and Chan, the final film to date starring all three was 1988's Dragons Forever.

Hung was also responsible for the Lucky Stars comedy film series in the 1980s. He directed and co-starred in the original trilogy, Winners and Sinners (1983), My Lucky Stars (1985) and Twinkle, Twinkle Lucky Stars (1985). These first three films featured Chan and Biao in supporting roles. Hung also produced and played a supporting role in the fourth film, Lucky Stars Go Places (1986), and made a cameo appearance in the seventh and final film, How to Meet the Lucky Stars (1996).

During the 1980s, Hung was instrumental in popularizing the jiangshi genre. Jiangshi are reanimated corpses which can only move by hopping due to the onset of rigor mortis, a Chinese equivalent to Western zombies. Two landmark films, Encounters of the Spooky Kind (1980) and The Dead and the Deadly (1983), featured jiangshi who move by hopping towards their victims, as well as Taoist priests with the ability to control the jiangshi (and at times, each other) through magical spells and charms. Hung's jiangshi films would pave the way for films such as the popular Mr. Vampire (1985), which he also produced, and its sequels. He revitalised the subgenre of female-led martial art films, producing cop films such as Yes, Madam a.k.a. Police Assassins (1985), which introduced stars Michelle Yeoh and Cynthia Rothrock.

=== 1990s ===
==== Film ====
After some relatively poor performances at the domestic box-office, Hung had a dispute with studio head, Raymond Chow. Hung had produced the thriller Into the Fire (1989), but Hung felt Golden Harvest had withdrawn the film from cinemas too soon. The disagreement led to Hung parting company with Golden Harvest in 1991, after 21 years with the company.

Whilst continuing to produce films through his own company Bojon Films Company Ltd, Hung failed to equal his early successes. His fortunes improved somewhat as the helmer of Mr. Nice Guy (1997), a long-awaited reunion with Chan.

In 1994, Hung coordinated the fight sequences in Wong Kar-wai's wuxia epic, Ashes of Time.

==== Television ====
In 1998, American television network CBS began to broadcast Martial Law (1998–2000) on Saturday nights, an action-drama built around Hung. The hour-long shows were a surprise success and installed Hung as the only East Asian headlining a prime-time network series. The television series was executive produced and occasionally directed by Stanley Tong and co-starred Arsenio Hall. Hung reportedly recited some of his English dialogue phonetically.

=== 2000s ===
==== Film ====
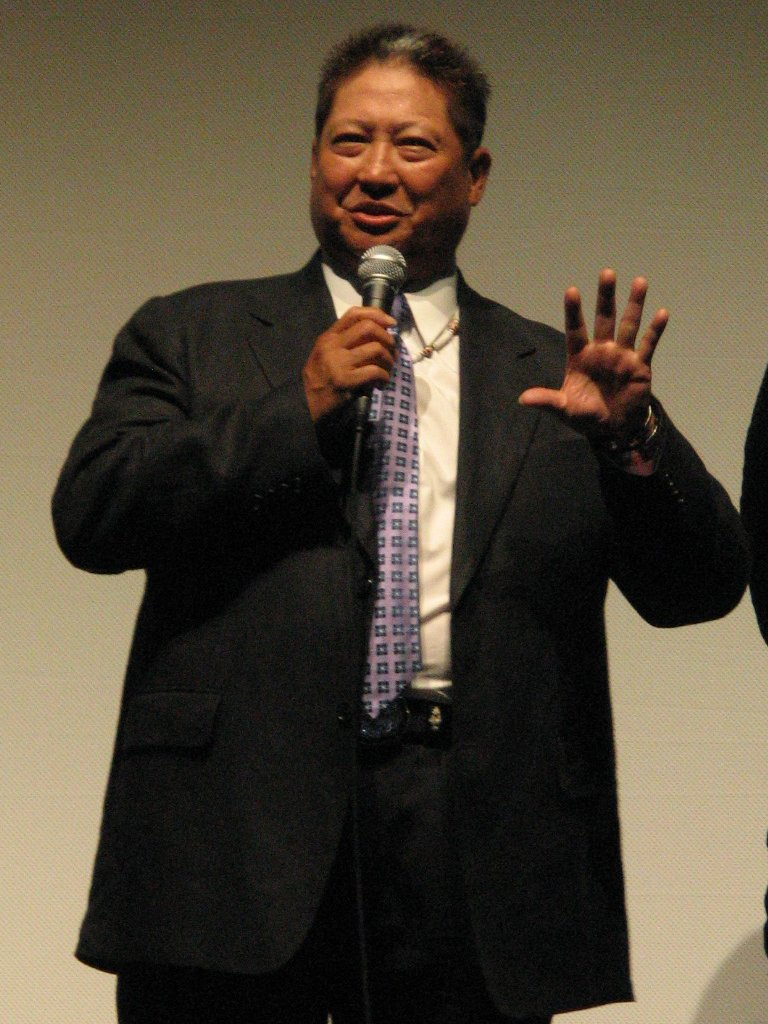
Hung in 2005

During 2000–2001, Hung expressed interest in creating a film adaptation of the video game Soulcalibur. The production agreement for the film was made around April 2001 with an estimated budget of $50 million. Hung had the idea of producing a martial arts epic with Chen Lung Jackie Chan in the lead role, but the film was never made. Hung's plans were detailed on his website, but after a year the announcement was removed. The film rights have since been acquired by Warren Zide, the producer of American Pie and Final Destination. No film ever materialized.

Hung found renewed success in the Hong Kong film industry in the 2000s, beginning with The Legend of Zu (2001), the long-awaited sequel to the 1983 hit Zu Warriors from the Magic Mountain. In 2004, Stephen Chow's Kung Fu Hustle was released. Though Yuen Woo-ping was credited for the martial arts choreography on Kung Fu Hustle, Hung actually did the preliminary work but left the film midway through, and Yuen filled in to complete it. Because of his departure from the film, there was tabloid speculation that he and Chow had strong differences over the film, resulting in their separation. Chow has since responded that Hung left for personal reasons and not because of speculated tensions. In 2004, Hung again worked with Jackie Chan, in a brief but notable appearance in Disney's Around the World in 80 Days as the legendary folk hero Wong Fei Hung, a character played by Chan in the Drunken Master series.

In 2005, Hung was involved in Daniel Lee's Dragon Squad and Wilson Yip's SPL: Sha Po Lang (aka Kill Zone). In the latter, Hung played a villain for the first time in over 25 years, and had his first ever fight scene against Donnie Yen. One of the key relationships in SPL had been Hung's role as the adoptive father of Wu Jing's character. However, these scenes were dropped from the final film as the director couldn't find a way to fit them into the film. In response to this, a prequel film was planned. Hung appeared alongside Wu Jing again in 2007's Twins Mission with stars, the Twins. In early 2008, Hung starred in Fatal Move, in which he and Ken Lo played a pair of rival triad gang leaders. He also starred in, and performed action choreography for, Daniel Lee's Three Kingdoms: Resurrection of the Dragon, with Andy Lau and Maggie Q. The film, was based on the book Romance of the Three Kingdoms.

Antony Szeto's film, Wushu, which stars Hung premiered in Beijing in October 2008. The film was unveiled by Golden Network at the 2008 Cannes Film Festival. Jackie Chan was the film's executive producer, and worked on the film in an advisory capacity, assisting with marketing and casting. Hung then worked again with director Wilson Yip and star Donnie Yen, as the action director for the 2008 film Ip Man.

In 2010, Hung was given a lifetime achievement award at the New York Asian Film Festival, where four of his films were shown. That year Hung appeared in Ip Man 2, which he also choreographed. His role is that of a Hung Gar master who challenges Ip Man. In the same year, Hung appeared in the movie The Legend Is Born: Ip Man as well. He acts as Chan Wah-shun, the martial arts teacher of Ip Man.

The annual and highly anticipated Hong Kong International Film Festival was held for its 45th edition in April 2021. Hung is one of the six veteran Hong Kong filmmakers who directed renowned local director Johnnie To Kei-fung's highly anticipated anthology series : "Septet: The Story of Hong Kong" (2022). The other filmmakers include Ringo Lam, Ann Hui On-wah, Patrick Tam Kar Ming, Tsui Hark, Yuen Woo-ping and Johnnie To. The short files were shot entirely on 35mm film with each of them touches on a nostalgic and moving story set across different time periods, with every one acting as an ode to the city.

==== Television ====
In between films and special appearances, Hung has appeared in several East Asian television series. In 2003, he was in mainland Chinese TV film series Dragon Laws with Fan Bingbing, followed by The Valley of Lost Vengeance (aka End Enmity Hollow). More recently, he played a master con-artist in the Taiwanese series Coming Lies and Wing Chun master Wong Wah-bo in Wing Chun, reprising the role he played in The Prodigal Son over 20 years earlier. He co-starred in the series alongside Yuen Biao, Nicholas Tse and his youngest son, Sammy Hung.

Hung appeared as a guest judge on the China Beijing TV Station reality television series The Disciple, which aired in mainland China and was produced by, and featured, Jackie Chan. The aim of the program was to find a new star, skilled in acting and martial arts, to become Chan's "successor", the champion being awarded the lead role in a film. It concluded on 7 June 2008, with the series winner announced in Beijing.

In another mainland Chinese television series, The Shaolin Warriors, set during the Ming Dynasty, Hung played Big Foot, a Shaolin warrior monk joining General Qi Jiguang's marines to help defend the nation against Japanese pirates. Sammy Hung also has a role, as Big Foot's disciple.

== Filmography ==
Hung has starred in 75 films, and worked on over 230, beginning as a child actor whilst still attending the China Drama Academy. Upon leaving the opera school, he worked as an extra and stuntman, and progressed through other roles including fight choreographer, stunt co-ordinator, action director, actor, writer, producer and director.

Most recently, Hung has starred in the 2017 historic action film God of War.

== Film production ==
=== Gar Bo Motion Picture Company ===
In 1978 Sammo Hung formed Gar Bo Motion Picture Company, a subsidiary of Golden Harvest, with director Karl Maka and former actor-choreographer Lau Kar Wing (brother of actors Lau Kar-leung and Gordon Liu). The company's name consists of the "Gar" sound from Lau Kar Wing and Karl Maka (Mak Kar), and "Bo" from Hung Kam Bo.). The company disbanded in 1980, when Maka moved on to form Cinema City & Films Co. with Raymond Wong and Dean Shek. Gar Bo released two films, both starring Hung and Lau:

- Dirty Tiger, Crazy Frog (1978)
- Odd Couple (1979)

=== Bo Ho Film Company Ltd. ===
1980 saw Raymond Chow pull one of Hung's films from local cinemas after just two weeks. Hung responded by starting his own production company, Bo Ho Film Company Ltd., allowing him to have greater control in producing Hong Kong films. While Bo Ho produced, Golden Harvest still operated as distributors. In all, 44 films were released by Bo Ho, several of which starred Hung:

- Encounters of the Spooky Kind (1980)
- Long Arm of the Law (1984)
- Pom Pom (1984)
- Hocus Pocus (1984)
- Mr. Vampire (1985)
- Heart of Dragon (1985)
- Those Merry Souls (1985)
- Goodbye Mammie (1986)
- Lucky Stars Go Places (1986)
- Millionaires Express (1986)
- Righting Wrongs (1986)
- Rosa (1986)
- The Strange Bedfellow (1986)
- Mr. Vampire II (1986)
- Eastern Condors (1987)
- Mr. Vampire III (1987)
- The Final Test (1987)
- The Happy Bigamist (1987)
- My Cousin, the Ghost (1987)
- Scared Stiff (1987)
- Sworn Brothers (1987)
- To Err is Humane (1987)
- In the Blood (1988)
- Lai Shi, China's Last Eunuch (1988)
- Mr. Vampire IV (1988)
- On the Run (1988)
- Paper Marriage (1988)
- Picture of a Nymph (1988)
- One Husband Too Many (1988)
- Blonde Fury (1989)
- Burning Sensation (1989)
- In Between Loves (1989)
- A Fishy Story (1989)
- Doctor's Heart (1990)
- Her Fatal Ways (1990)
- Mortuary Blues (1990)
- Shanghai, Shanghai (1990)
- She Shoots Straight (1990)
- Queens Bench III (1990)
- Bury Me High (1991)
- The Top Bet (1991)
- You Bet Your Life (1991)
- Lover at Large (1991)
- The Scorpion King (1992)

=== D&B Films Company Ltd ===
In 1983, Hung co-founded another production company, D&B Films Company Ltd ("D&B" being short for "Duk-Bo"), with Dickson Poon and John Shum. The company operated until 1992 and produced a total of 68 Hong Kong films:

- Hong Kong 1941 (1984)
- The Owl vs Bombo (1984)
- The Return of Pom Pom (1984)
- The Island (1985)
- It's a Drink, It's a Bomb (1985)
- Mr. Boo Meets Pom Pom (1985)
- Yes, Madam (1985)
- Night Caller (1985)
- Dream Lovers (1986)
- Silent Love (1986)
- Passion (1986)
- Legacy of Rage (1986)
- My Family (1986)
- Pom Pom Strikes Back (1986)
- Conduct Zero (1986)
- Royal Warriors (1986)
- Brotherhood (1986)
- From Here to Prosperity (1986)
- The Lunatics (1986)
- Caper (1986)
- Devoted to You (1986)
- Where's Officer Tuba? (1986)
- Kiss Me Goodbye (1986)
- It's a Mad Mad World (1987)
- Porky's Meatballs (1987)
- The Wrong Couple (1987)
- Wonder Women (1987)
- Magnificent Warriors (1987)
- You're OK, I'm OK! (1987)
- The Final Victory (1987)
- Easy Money (1987)
- The Gang Don't Shoot Straight a.k.a. The Goofy Gang (1987)
- An Autumn's Tale (1987)
- Sapporo Story (1987)
- Heart to Hearts (1988)
- It's a Mad Mad World 2 (1988)
- Tiger Cage (1988)
- Fury (1988)
- Classmate Party a.k.a. Student Union (1988)
- Double Fattiness (1988)
- In the Line of Duty III (1988)
- Vengeance Is Mine (1988)
- Keep on Dancing (1988)
- Bless This House (1988)
- Happy Together (1989)
- In the Line of Duty 4: Witness (1989)
- Mr. Fortune (1989)
- Unfaithfully Yours (1989)
- It's a Mad Mad World 3 (1989)
- The Nobles (1989)
- Funny Ghost (1989)
- A Bite of Love (1990)
- Love is Love (1990)
- Middle Man (1990)
- Tiger Cage 2 (1990)
- Heart into Hearts (1990)
- BB 30 (1990)
- Forbidden Arsenal (1991)
- The Perfect Match (1991)
- The Plot (1991)
- Sea Wolves (1991)
- Dreams of Glory, A Boxer's Story (1991)
- Tiger Cage 3 (1991)
- Black Cat (1991)
- His Fatal Ways (1991)
- Will of Iron (1991)
- Black Cat 2 (1992)
- Heart Against Hearts (1992)

=== Bojon Films Company Ltd ===
In 1980, Hung formed a production company, Bojon Films Company Ltd. The company produced 12 films, 8 of which starred Hung:

- Two Toothless Tigers (1980)
- Twinkle, Twinkle, Lucky Stars (1985)
- Spooky, Spooky (1988)
- Pedicab Driver (1989)
- Into the Fire (1989)
- Encounters of the Spooky Kind II (1990)
- Pantyhose Hero (1990)
- License to Steal (1990)
- Slickers vs. Killers (1991)
- Banana Spirit (1992)
- Lover's Tear (1992)
- Don't Give a Damn (1995)

== Personal life ==
- Hung's grandmother was martial-arts actress Chin Tsi-ang who starred in almost 80 films between 1941 and 2002. His grandfather, a film director and writer, Hung Chung Ho, directed over 40 films between 1937 and 1950.
- Hung's younger brother, Lee Chi-kit, has worked on almost 40 films, many of which Hung was also involved with. Lee also worked on Hung's Martial Law series. He works primarily as a supporting actor and action director.
- In 1973, he married Jo Eun-ok (曹恩玉). Jo was his girlfriend whom he met during filming in Korea and later became his female assistant. They have three sons, Tin-Ming "Timmy" Hung (洪天明; born 1974), Tin Cheung "Jimmy" Hung (洪天祥; born 1977), Tin Chiu "Sammy" Hung (洪天照; born 1979), and a daughter, Chan Yu "Stephanie" Hung (洪煦榆; born 1983) with her. Hung divorced Jo in 1994.
- He married model and actress Joyce Godenzi in 1995. Godenzi appeared in several of his films including Eastern Condors (1986), Spooky, Spooky (1988), Paper Marriage (1988) and She Shoots Straight (1990) prior to the pair becoming a couple. She also appeared in Mr. Nice Guy (1997).

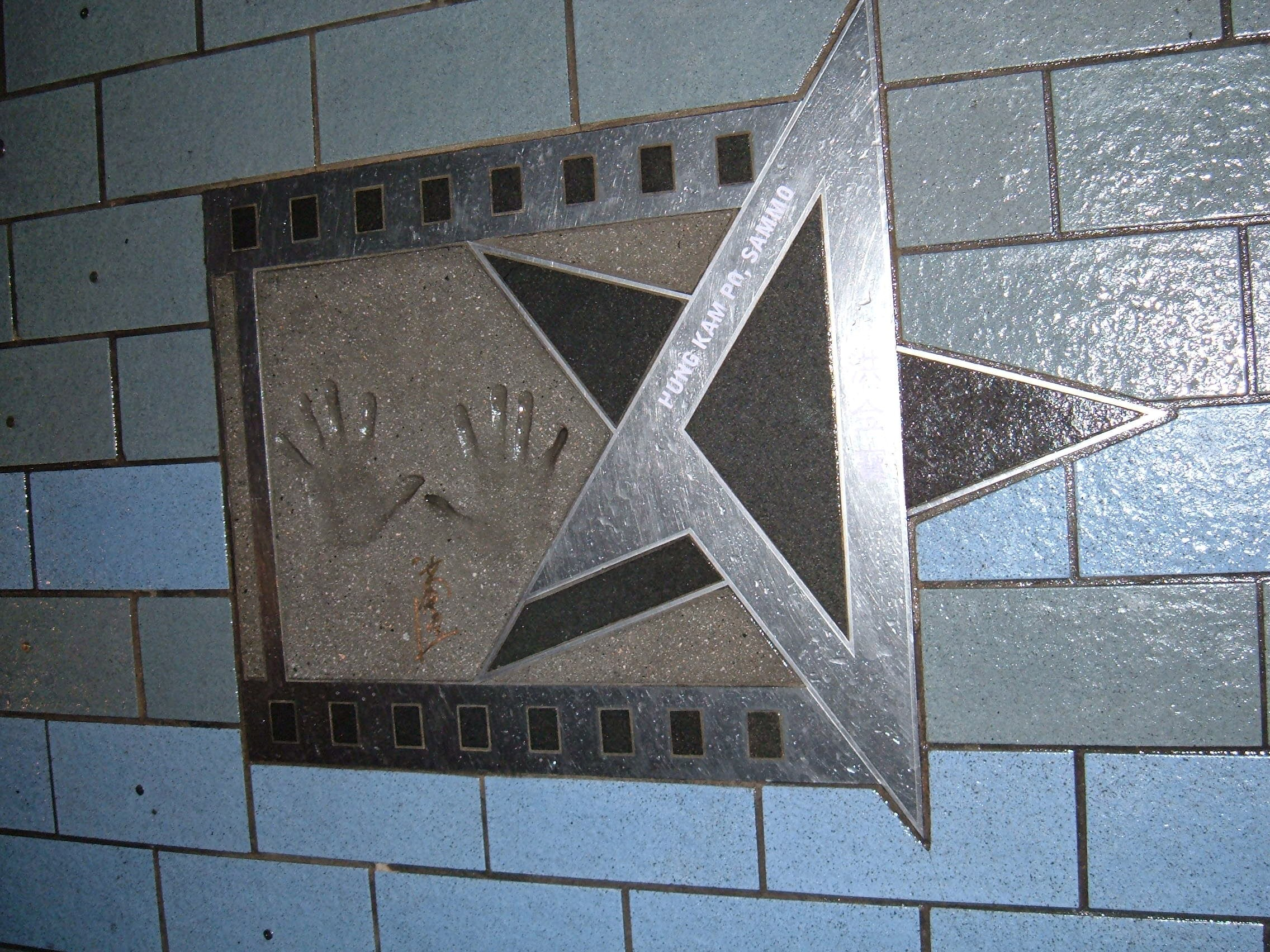
Hung's star, hand prints and autograph on the Avenue of Stars

- Timmy Hung has appeared alongside his father in SPL: Sha Po Lang, Legend of the Dragon, and Kung Fu Chefs, as well as having a recurring role in Sammo's series, Martial Law.
- Sammy Hung appeared as the nemesis to Nicholas Tse's character in the 2007 television series Wing Chun, a remake of the original series broadcast in 1994, and the subsequent film Wing Chun. The series also starred Sammo Hung and Yuen Biao. Sammy also appeared alongside his father in the film Choy Lee Fut.
- Hung is one of the celebrities honoured on the Avenue of Stars, Hong Kong.
- Hung is known for his large frame. Despite this, he is a surprisingly agile and formidable martial artist.
- He has a circular scar on the right side of his face, just above his lip. In the early days of his film career, Hung was involved in a street fight outside a Kowloon nightclub, and was stabbed with a broken cola bottle.
- On 5 August 2009, Hung became ill during the filming of Ip Man 2 in the Guangdong province of Foshan. He was admitted to hospital and underwent a heart surgery operation. He was discharged and returned to work within days. He cited a combination of his weight, his love of cigars and long filming hours resulting in fatigue and irregular meals as the cause.

== In popular culture ==
- A pop band from Wales named themselves Sammo Hung after the actor.
- Master Elehung Kinpo, from Juken Sentai Gekiranger, is named after him. Coincidentally, Yū Mizushima, the voice actor for Elehung Kinpo, did the dubbing for Sammo Hung.
- A martial artist named Samohan Kinpou is frequently referred to in the anime Negima?!

== See also ==
- Cinema of Hong Kong
- Hong Kong action cinema
