= Igor & The Red Elvises discography =

- Studio albums: 14
- Soundtrack albums: 1
- Live albums: 2
- Compilation albums: 1
- Music videos: 2

The following is the discography of the American band Igor & The Red Elvises.

== Studio albums ==
| Year | Title |
|---|---|
| 1996 | Give Us A Break (as Limpopo): Release: March 26, 1996; Label: Folk And Roll/ Shoobah-Doobah; Format: CD |
| 1996 | Grooving To The Moscow Beat: Release: May 26, 1996; Label: Shoobah-Doobah; Format: CD |
| 1997 | Surfing In Siberia: Release: September 29, 1997; Label: Shoobah-Doobah; Format: CD |
| 1998 | I Wanna See You Bellydance: Release: July 28, 1998; Label: Shoobah-Doobah; Format: CD |
| 1999 | Russian Bellydance: Release: March 3, 1999; Label: Shoobah-Doobah; Format: CD |
| 1999 | Better Than Sex: Release: March 3, 1999; Label: Shoobah-Doobah; Format: CD |
| 2000 | Shake Your Pelvis: Release: April 11, 2000; Label: Shoobah-Doobah; Format: CD |
| 2001 | Bedroom Boogie: Release: March 13, 2001; Label: Shoobah-Doobah; Format: CD |
| 2001 | Welcome to the Freakshow: Release: March 13, 2001; Label: Shoobah-Doobah; Format: CD |
| 2002 | Rokenrol: Release: August 6, 2002; Label: Shoobah-Doobah; Format: CD |
| 2004 | Lunatics and Poets: Release: July 20, 2004; Label: Shoobah-Doobah; Format: CD |
| 2009 | Drinking With Jesus: Release: June 16, 2009; Label: Shoobah-Doobah; Format: CD |
| 2014 | Bacon: Release: September 16, 2014; Label: Shoobah-Doobah; Format: CD |
| 2017 | She Works For KGB: Release: 2017; Label: Igor Yuzov; Format: CD |
| 2019 | My Name Is Elvis!: Release: September 11, 2019; Label: Plan 9 Trash Records; Format: CD |

== Live albums ==
| Year | Title |
|---|---|
| 2000 | Your Favorite Band Live: Release: September 12, 2000; Label: Shoobah-Doobah; Format: CD |
| 2012 | Live in Montana: Release: September 29, 2012; Label: Shoobah-Doobah; Format: CD |

== Compilation albums ==
| Year | Title |
|---|---|
| 2007 | 30 Greatest Hits: Release: June 19, 2007; Label: Shoobah-Doobah; Format: CD |

== Music videos ==
| Year | Title |
|---|---|
| 1997 | Live On The Pacific Ocean: Release: November 25, 1997; Label: Shoobah-Doobah; Format: VHS |
| 2007 | Live In Moscow: Release: March 20, 2007; Label: Shoobah-Doobah; Format: DVD |

== Soundtracks ==
| Year | Title |
|---|---|
| 1997 | Six-String Samurai: Release: August 25, 1998; Label: Rykodisc; Format: CD |
