= Stephanie Lai =

Hong Kong female singer and actress

- 黎明詩
- Born: June 15, 1965; British Hong Kong
- Died: March 28, 2024 (aged 58)
- Other name: 詩妹
- Occupations: Singer; actress
- Years active: 1988–1998
- Notable work: "Goodbye My Love" "Unstoppable Love" "Falling in Love with People Who Don't Love Me"
- Father: Lai Ka-po
- Relatives: Tristan Lai Wing-yip (brother)

Stephanie Lai Ming-sze (Chinese: 黎明詩), 15 June 1965 – 28 March 2024) was a Hong Kong female Cantopop singer and actress. Her father is Hong Kong Cantonese opera actor Lai Ka-po, and one of his younger brothers is Hong Kong Commercial Radio presenter Tristan Lai Wing-yip. She is also a master of cooking and is known as the "Hidden Kitchen God".

== Biography ==
In 1990, Lai sang the rap part of Norman Cheung's song "Opposites Attract." The lyrics "You're so scheming. You send me flowers every day. How can you let me down? Go home quickly. I'm not as vengeful as you. It's not your fault, Cheung Lap Kei!" became a popular catchphrase on the streets at the time. She is also the heroine of the music video of this song.

Lai released her first Cantonese album, Besame, in 1991.

In the early 1990s, in addition to performing on stage abroad, she also performed in the educational program "English Travel" hosted by Lau Ka Kit on Radio Television Hong Kong, and also appeared in the travel program of TVB. Held several concerts overseas from 1993 to 1994. After releasing her last solo album "I Really Miss You" in 1994, she retired from the entertainment industry.

After retiring from the showbiz industry, she focused on taking care of her family and settled in Discovery Bay. During the same period, she worked as an insurance broker for 2 years on the recommendation of a friend. As she was self-conscious and not very proactive, she ended up not developing in this industry. Afterwards, she was introduced by Du Jingjing to participate in the activities of the Hong Kong Artist Golf Association. In 2017, she publicly came out and had a girlfriend and had separated from her husband, and expressed interest in restarting her career.

In July 2023, Lai was diagnosed with esophageal cancer. After actively fighting cancer for more than half a year, Lai died in her sleep on the morning of March 28, 2024, age 58.

== Discography ==
- Besame (1991)
- Back to Innocence (1991)
- 全心愛我 (1992)
- Besamix (1992)
- Really Miss You (1994)
- 星聲傳集 (2002)

== Filmography ==
Year	Title	Role	Notes	Source
1988	The Inspector Wears Skirts	Banshee Squad Member	Action-Comedy Movie	
1990	Chaos by Design	Actress	Comedy Movie	
1989	The Inspector Wears Skirts II	Banshee Squad Member	Action-Comedy Movie	
1989	City Squeeze	Actress	Comedy Movie	
1991	Legend of the Brothers	Actress	Action-Crime Film	
1994	Give & Take... Oh! Shit!	Angel	Comedy Movie	

== Awards ==
Year	Award	Category	Result
1991	Ultimate Song Chart Awards	New Female Singer	Won
1991	Jade Solid Gold Awards	Most Popular Newcomer	Bronze
