= Give Us a Break =

Give Us a Break may refer to:

- Give Us a Break (Arrogance album), 1973
- Give Us a Break (Limpopo album), 1995
- Give Us a Break (Proctor and Bergman album), 1978
- Give Us a Break (TV series), a 1983 BBC comedy series starring Paul McGann
- "Give Us a Break", Joe Brown song
