= Russian Bellydance =

Studio album by Igor & The Red Elvises
- Released: March 3, 1999
- Genre: Rock
- Label: Shoobah-Doobah Records
- Producer: Igor & The Red Elvises

Igor & The Red Elvises chronology
Six-String Samurai (1998)	Russian Bellydance (1999)	Better Than Sex (1999)

== Production history ==
In 1999, Igor & The Red Elvises released a new version of I Wanna See You Bellydance, with the vocals entirely sung in Russian.

== Track listing ==
1. Cosmonaut Petrov
2. Intro
3. Bellydance
4. Love is not for sale
5. El Nino
6. We're Dancing Lambada
7. Hawaiian Dancing Song
8. Odessa Tango
9. Candle
10. Brave Pilots' Song
11. Good Bye, My Love, Good Bye
12. New Years Song
13. After the Carnival

Professional ratings
Review scores
Source	Rating
Allmusic	2.5/5 stars

== Credits ==
Zhenya - guitars, vocals
Avi - drums, vocals
Igor - vocals, guitar
Oleg - bass, vocals

Guest performers:
Dimitri Mamokhin - trumpet
Gary Herbig - Sax and flute
Leo "Groovitz" Chelyapov - clarinet
Skip Waring - trombone
Chris Golden - fretless bass

Recorded at USMP Studios, Hollywood CA under the watchful ear of Svet Lazarov
Art and design by Human Fly Graphics / Go Man Go Design
With special guest Pain-in-the-ass "Art Director" Oleg Bernov
