= The Inspector Wears Skirts II =

1989 Hong Kong film by Wellson Chin

- DVD cover
- 神勇飛虎霸王花
- Directed by: Wellson Chin Sing-wai
- Written by: Abe Kwon Man-wai; Lee Man-choi
- Produced by: Jackie Chan
- Starring: Sibelle Hu; Sandra Ng; Billy Lau; Regina Kent; Kara Wai; Stanley Fung Shui-Fan; Amy Yip
- Cinematography: Cheung Yiu-cho
- Edited by: Peter Cheung Yiu-Chung
- Music by: Noel Quinlan
- Production companies: Golden Harvest; Golden Way Films; Paragon Films
- Release date: 1989
- Running time: 96 minutes
- Country: Hong Kong
- Language: Cantonese

The Inspector Wears Skirts II (Chinese: 神勇飛虎霸王花; Jyutping: san4 jung5 fei1 fu2 baa3 wong4 faa1; lit. 'Mythical Courageous Elite Beautiful Bullies'; also known as Top Squad and The Inspector Wears Skirts Part 2) is a Hong Kong action comedy film released in 1989. The film is a sequel to 1988's The Inspector Wears Skirts.

== Plot ==
The all-woman police squad receive some new members resulting in romantic drama. Towards the end of the film terrorists kidnap the squad's commander.

== Cast ==
- Sibelle Hu Hui-chung as Madame Wu
- Sandra Ng Kwan-yu as Amy
- Kara Hui Ying-hung as May
- May Lo Mei-mei as Joey
- Angille Leung Wan-yui as Phoebe
- Joanna Chan Pui-san as Banshee Squad Member
- Amy Yip Chi-mei as Susanna
- Regina Kent as Lam
- Bill Tung Biu as Police Commissioner Tung
- Stanley Fung Shui-fan as Kan
- Billy Lau Nam-kwong as Nan
- Melvin Wong Kam-sun as Lo
- Jeff Falcon as Terrorist
- Ken Lo Wai-kwong as Flying Tiger Member
- Feng Sing as Mars
- Ricky Hui Koon-ying

== Home media ==
The film was released on VHS by Tai Seng and on LaserDisc by Star Entertainment. On March 11, 2024, it was released on Blu-ray by 88 Films.

== Critical reception ==
In a retrospective write-up, Rick Baker & Ken Miller give the film a slightly positive review, stating "[s]everal well-coordinated stunts, courtesy of the Jackie Chan Stunt Team, help save this film from becoming a run-of-the-mill romance movie". John Charles is slightly more negative, giving the film a rating of 4/10 and stating "the action sequences here are much shorter than those in the previous film and are not as well staged, leaving the comedy as the main component. For most viewers, that will not be enough".
