= Welcome to the Freakshow =

Welcome to the Freakshow may refer to:

- Welcome to the Freak Show, 1997 Christian rock album by DC Talk
- Welcome to the Freakshow (Red Elvises album), 2001 rock album
- Welcome to the Freakshow (Hinder album), 2012 rock album
