= Live at The Great American Music Hall =

Live At The Great American Music Hall refers to various live music recordings:

- Live at The Great American Music Hall, a 2023 album of a 1975 concert recording by Billy Joel
- Live at the Great American Music Hall (DVD), a live recording by Secret Chiefs 3
- Your Favorite Band "Live" At The Great American Music Hall, a 2000 album by Igor & The Red Elvises

== See also ==
- Great American Music Hall
