= Better Than Sex =

Better Than Sex may refer to:

- Better Than Sex (film), a 2000 Australian film
- Better Than Sex (book), a 1994 book by Hunter S. Thompson
- Better Than Sex (album), a 1999 album by the Red Elvises
