= 30 Greatest Hits (Red Elvises album) =

Greatest hits album by Igor & The Red Elvises
- Released: 2006
- Genre: Rock
- Label: Shoobah-Doobah Records
- Producer: Igor & The Red Elvises

Igor & The Red Elvises chronology
Live In Moscow (2006)	30 Greatest Hits (2006)	Drinking With Jesus (2008)

30 Greatest Hits is a 2007 compilation released by the Igor & The Red Elvises.

== Track listing ==
Disc One

1. I Wanna See You Bellydance
2. Closet Disco Dancer
3. Gypsy Heart
4. Love Rocket
5. Rocketman
6. Sex In Paradise
7. Boogie On The Beach
8. Million Miles
9. Venice USA
10. All I Wanna Do
11. 200 lb Of Pure Love
12. Winter Reggae
13. Everybody Disco
14. Kegga Beer
15. Memoirs of a Phuket Geisha

Disc Two

1. Hanky Panky Kind Of Love
2. Don't Stop The Dance
3. 200 Flying Girls
4. Siberia
5. Jerry's Got A Squeezebox
6. Harriett
7. Sad Cowboy Song
8. My Love Is Killing Me
9. My Darling Lorraine
10. Strip Joint Is Closed
11. Ticket To Japan
12. I'm Not That Kind Of Guy
13. Juliet
14. Tango
15. Good Guys
