= Drinking with Jesus =

Drinking With Jesus

Studio album by Igor & The Red Elvises
- Released: June 16, 2009
- Recorded: Cinque Ports (Santa Monica, California)
- Genre: Rock
- Label: Shoobah-Doobah Records
- Producer: Igor & The Red Elvises

Igor & The Red Elvises chronology
30 Greatest Hits (2007)	Drinking With Jesus (2009)	Live in Montana (2012)

Drinking With Jesus is a 2009 album by the Igor & The Red Elvises.

== Track listing ==
1. "Drinking With Jesus"
2. "Lara's Wedding"
3. "Better Than Cocaine"
4. "Me & My Baby"
5. "Tra-la-la"
6. "Twist Like Uma Thurman"
7. "Into the Sun"
8. "Don't Crucify Me"
9. "Play Me Your Banjo"
10. "Wearing Black"
11. "Stupid Drinking Song"
12. "Paris Waltz"
13. "Bourbon Street"

Professional ratings
Review scores
Source	Rating
Americana Music Times	5/6 stars
The Washington Post	(favorable)

== Credits ==
- All songs written by Igor Yuzov (except "Don't Crucify Me" written by M. Gorsheniov and I. Yuzov)
- Produced by Red Elvises
- Igor Yuzov - vocals, guitars, bass
- Oleg Bernov - vocals, bass
- Oleg Schramm - Hammond, piano, accordion
- Elena Shemankova - keyboard, accordion, piano
- Adam Gust - drums
- Toshi Yanagi - guitar
- Nikolay Kurganov - violin
- Dean Roubicek - saxophone
- Ted Falcon - violin
- James Miller - trombone
- Artiom Zhuliev - saxophone
- Maksim Velichkin - cello
- Ron Barrows - trumpet
- M. (Gorshok) Gorsheniov - vocals on "Don't Crucify Me"
- Drums recorded at Sea Sound, engineer Evan Biegel
- Recorded at Cinque Ports, Venice CA 2008
- Recording Engineers - Oleg Schramm and Oleg Bernov
- Mixing - Barry Conley
- Mastering - Mark Chalecki, Little Red Book Mastering
- Art and Package Design - Jamie Vercauteren
- Printing at S&J Graphics
