= Lunatics and Poets =

Studio album by Igor & The Red Elvises
- Released: July 20, 2004
- Genre: Rock
- Label: Shoobah-Doobah Records
- Producer: Igor & The Red Elvises

Igor & The Red Elvises chronology
Rokenrol (2002)	Lunatics and Poets (2004)	Live in Moscow (2006)

Professional ratings
Review scores
Source	Rating
Allmusic	2.5/5 stars

Lunatics and Poets is a 2004 album by the Igor & The Red Elvises.

== Track listing ==
1. Ocean
2. Venice, USA
3. Night Butterfly
4. Love Rocket
5. Wind
6. Winter Reggae
7. Ticket to Japan
8. Memoirs of a Phuket Geisha
9. Juliet
10. Tchaikovski
11. Party Like a Rock Star
12. This Music Is Wasted If We Don't Dance

All songs written by Igor Yuzov

== Personnel ==
- Igor Yuzov - Banjo, Bass, Composer, Guitar, Vocals
- Oleg Bernov - Bass, Engineer, Guitar, Percussion, Programming, Vocals
- George Earth - Theremin
- Chris Golden - Bass
- Ted Kamp - Bass (Acoustic)
- Nickolai Kurganov - Violin
- Dmitri Mamokhin - Trumpet
- Oleg Schramm - Accordion, Organ (Hammond), Piano
- Jay Work - Flute, Saxophone
- Toshi Yanagi - Guitar
- Adam Gust - Drums
- Evan Biegel - Engineer
- Barry Conley - Mixing
- Erik Hockman - Mastering, Mixing
- Christie Moeller - Package Design
