= Live 8 concert, Moscow =

2005 concert in Russia

On 2 July 2005, a Live 8 concert was held in Red Square, Moscow, Russia. Although not on such a large scale as the concerts held at Hyde Park, London and Philadelphia, it was still a momentous occasion for Russia.

The event is also often referred to as "Live 8 Moscow" or "Live 8 Russia".

== Lineup ==
- Agatha Christie - "Триллер" (The Thriller), "Ковёр-вертолёт" (The Helicopter Carpet), "Сказочная тайга" (The Fairy Taiga), "Как на войне" (Like At War) (M 20:06)
- Bi-2 (M 20:26)
- Bravo (M 20:46)
- Dolphin (M 21:06)
- Douglas Vale - Popular, A Little While, Crush...Interrupted, En El Tunel (M 21:26)
- Jungo (M 21:46)
- Linda (M 22:06)
- Moral Code X (M 22:26)
- Red Elvises - "I Wanna See You Bellydance", "Ticket To Japan", "Kosmonaut Petrov" (M 22:46)
- Splean (M 23:06)
- Garik Sukachov (M 23:26)
- Valeriy Syutkin (M 23:46)
- Aliona Sviridova (M 00:06)
- Pet Shop Boys - "It's a Sin", "Suburbia", "Opportunities (Let's Make Lots of Money)", "Domino Dancing", "New York City Boy", "Always on My Mind", "Where the Streets Have No Name (I Can't Take My Eyes off You)", "West End Girls", "Left to My Own Devices", "Go West", "It's a Sin" (M 00:26)
