= Outlaw Brothers =

1990 Hong Kong film by Frankie Chan

- Chinese: 最佳賊拍檔
- Directed by: Frankie Chan
- Written by: Barry Wong
- Produced by: Frankie Chan; Eric Tsang
- Starring: Frankie Chan; Siu Chung Mok; Michael Miu Kiu Wai; Yukari Oshima
- Cinematography: Ma Goon-Wa
- Edited by: Siu Nam
- Music by: Roel A. Garcia
- Production company: Movie Impact Limited
- Distributed by: Newport Entertainment Co., Ltd (Hong Kong)
- Release date: 17 March 1990 (Hong Kong)
- Running time: 97 min
- Country: Hong Kong
- Language: Cantonese
- Box office: HK$5.1 million

Outlaw Brothers (Chinese: 最佳賊拍檔) is a 1990 Hong Kong film directed by Frankie Chan. It has been described as Frankie Chan's best film as a director.

== Cast ==
- Frankie Chan - James
- Siu Chung Mok - Bond
- Michael Miu Kiu Wai - Sergeant Tai Hwa Wang
- Yukari Oshima - Tequila
- Michiko Nishiwaki - Miego
- Sheila Chin - Lan
- Jeffrey Falcon
- Mark Houghton
- Vincent Lyn
- Ken Boyle
- Jonathan Gisger
- Dan Mintz
- Ken Goodman
- Steve Tartalia
- Anthony Houk
- Bruce Fontaine
