= Igor & The Red Elvises =

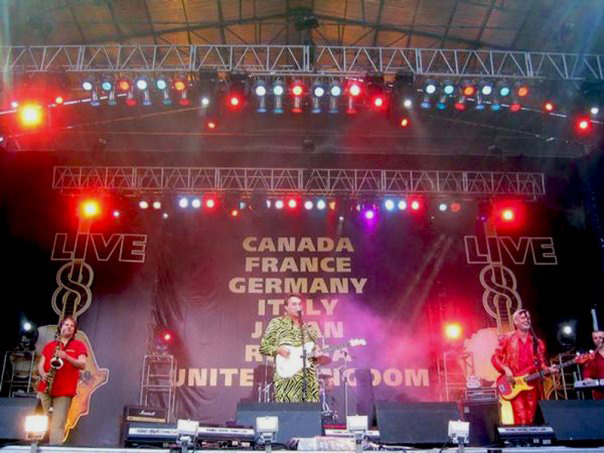
- Igor & The Red Elvises performing Live 8 benefit concert in Moscow's Red Square, 2005

Background information
- Origin: United States
- Genres: rockabilly, surf rock, folk rock, funk rock, disco
- Years active: 1995–present
- Website: www.redelvises.com

Igor & The Red Elvises (formerly known as Limpopo and later Red Elvises) are an American cult band that performs funk rock, surf, rockabilly, reggae, folk rock, disco and traditional Russian styles of music. They were founded in California in 1995 and are based in Los Angeles.

== Early history ==
Igor & The Red Elvises were founded in 1995 by Igor Yuzov, Oleg Bernov, and Zhenya Rock. Igor and Oleg met during a Russian-American peace walk and subsequently played together in a Russian folk-rock band called Limpopo. The band's third original member, guitarist Zhenya Rock (a.k.a. Kolykhanov), had also emigrated to America and had been the lead guitarist of the band until 2004. For the first few months Andrey Baranov was the band's drummer, but within that year, the first American in the band, drummer Avi Sills from Austin, Texas, was added to the lineup.

The band first began as an LA street act at Santa Monica's 3rd Street Promenade, but the large crowds they drew caused these to be discontinued.

== 1995–2001 ==
When they weren't playing on the road they were busy recording and self-producing their own CDs. Grooving To The Moscow Beat was the band's first release in 1996, followed by Surfing In Siberia in 1997. In 1998, the band released their breakthrough CD, I Wanna See You Bellydance. Their music filled the soundtrack of Lance Mungia's independent film released in 1998, Six-String Samurai soundtrack and episode acting. With Mungia directing, the band also produced two music videos of songs from the Six-String Samurai soundtrack, "Lovepipe" and "Boogie on the Beach", that year. A full-length concert video, Live on the Pacific Ocean, was also released, showcasing their appearance at the Santa Monica Pier's Twilight Summer Concert Series.

The band also had several television show appearances, resulting in a guest spot in an episode of Fox television series Melrose Place (Episode #206, "Suspicion") which aired on November 9, 1998. Near the end of that year, they appeared on FX's Penn & Teller's Sin City Spectacular accompanied by Penn & Teller's show dancers, which aired in January 1999. They released three new recordings in 1999, two studio-produced and one live. The band's fourth and fifth studio albums, Better Than Sex and Russian Bellydance, a Russian-language version of their smash album I Wanna See You Bellydance from the previous year, were both released in March 1999. Later in that same month, their performance in San Francisco was released as the band's first live double album, Live at the Great American Music Hall.

In the summer of 1999, the FX television channel hired Igor & The Red Elvises to play in Malibu on the beach for their Beverly Hills, 90210 Swimsuit Beach Party, highlighting a marathon airing of syndicated episodes of the hit series. FX held a contest and flew the winners and ten of their friends to the beach party to appear on TV and dance to the band's music. Later, they provided the theme, score, and songs for the Cartoon Network animated series Mike, Lu & Og.

February 2000 brought a brief change in musical direction for the band with the release of their seventh CD, Shake Your Pelvis, a more electronic techno/disco style CD that greatly differed from their earlier releases. December 2000 also saw an end to Avi Sills' association with the band with his decision to move on to other musical opportunities.

== 2001–2008 ==
In 2001 the band worked as a trio with Oleg Bernov on drums, Igor Yuzov on electric bass guitar and Zhenya Rock as lead guitarist. In March 2001 two studio CDs were released, Welcome to the Freakshow, written entirely by Yuzov, and Bedroom Boogie, written entirely by Zhenya Rock. The group continued to tour America throughout the year and was also invited to tour Russia.

In 2002, Rokenrol was recorded entirely in Russian, with the exception of two songs (Juliet by I.Yuzov and Sunshine by Z.Rock) in English. Zhenya Rock began a side project, Zeerok, going in a completely different musical direction, By the end of the year, Zhenya Rock decided to commit to his new band full-time, announcing his departure from Ifor & The Red Elvises. The band kept busy during the summer months with a tour through Russia that included some filming for the film Mail Order Bride, returning home in August to record the soundtrack. The band also returned to television with an appearance playing themselves in an episode of the Fox action series Fastlane (Episode #3 "Gone Native").

In 2003, Yuzov switched back to guitar, this time on lead, and Bernov returned to the large bass balalaika. Completing the new lineup was another Russian, Oleg "Schramm" Gorbunov on keyboards and accordion and new American drummer Adam Gust.

In 2005, they were asked to perform in the Moscow Live8 concert, along with the Pet Shop Boys and a number of local performers. In 2006, Elena Shemankova from Moscow, the first female member of the band, joined on keyboards and was very well received. The next year they were joined by female guitarist Beth Garner from Texas, who was with them for two American tours that year.

== 2009 to present ==
In early 2009, Igor & The Red Elvises announced that longtime member and bassist Bernov had decided to leave the band. Subsequent postings on their website announced either that he was on a "friendly break" or had gone on to start his own group. In February 2009, Bernov announced that he had joined the start-up project of the now world-famous show Slava's Snowshow staged by Russian performance artist Slava Polunin, in which Bernov plays a stage role.

Later that month, Yuzov rolled out a new line-up called "Igor and The Red Elvises". The first performance under this new name took place at Rusty's in Santa Monica. The concert was attended mainly by new members of the group (except for Yuzov and Gust). In April of the same year, they celebrated the anniversary of the founding of the group with free concerts on the embankment of 3rd Street in Santa Monica, for which Bernov temporarily rejoined the group. Igor and The Red Elvises continue the 2010 tour with core members Igor Yuzov on guitar, Oleg Bernov on bass balalaika, and Sarah Johnson on saxophone and keyboards.

In September 2014, the band released their 12th studio album, Bacon. This would be the first non-live album released under the new name "Igor and The Red Elvises". In December 2014, Bernov again departed the band and continued his solo career.

Igor & The Red Elvises continued on to release two more CD's to date, namely "She Works For KGB" in 2017, and "My Name Is Elvis!" in 2019.

On October 3, 2026, the founding members of The Red Elvises Igor Yuzov, Oleg Bernov and Zhenya Rock reunited for a special concert at the MUZART festival in San Francisco for the first time in 25 years, along with the current Red Elvises members of many years: Crazy Tomes, Yury Krivoshein and Tim Hakala.

== Success and tours in Russia ==
Starting in 2002, the group annually went on tour to Russia, spending two summer months playing in clubs in major cities such as Moscow and Saint Petersburg, as well as in their hometown of Yuzov in Odesa in Ukraine.

However, the COVID-19 pandemic caused a two-year hiatus to their tours, and the war in Ukraine caused further overseas tour cancelations.

== Discography ==
=== Studio albums ===
- Grooving to the Moscow Beat (1996)
- Surfing In Siberia (1997)
- I Wanna See You Bellydance (1998)
- Russian Bellydance (1999)
- Better Than Sex (1999)
- Shake Your Pelvis (2000)
- Bedroom Boogie (2001)
- Welcome to the Freakshow (2001)
- Rokenrol (2002)
- Lunatics and Poets (2004)
- Drinking with Jesus (2009)
- Bacon (2014)
- She Works for KGB (2017)
- My Name Is Elvis! (2019)

=== Others ===
- "Crazy Russian Folk And Roll" (as Limpopo) (1991)
- Give Us a Break (as Limpopo) (1995)
- Six-String Samurai soundtrack (1998)
- Your Favorite Band Live (live album) (2000)
- Elvis Has Not Left the Building (Live In Moscow 2004) /The Best Of Kick-Ass
- 30 Greatest Hits (greatest hits compilation) (2007)
- Made In Santa Monica (Russian compilation) (2008)
- Igor & Red Elvises - Live in Montana (live album) (2012)

== Videography ==
- Live On The Pacific Ocean (1997, VHS)
- Live In Moscow (2006, DVD)

== Film and television appearances ==
| Year | Film | Role | Director | Notes |
|---|---|---|---|---|
| 2011 | Jet-Lagged (film) | composer | Gregory Flitsanov | |
| 2010 | The Ballad of Mary & Ernie (web series) | composer | Robert Stadd | Episode 3, "Looking For Something?" |
| 2007 | Botched (film) | composer | Kit Ryan | |
| 2005 | Live 8 (TV) | Performance | Moscow TV production | Performed at Live 8 Moscow alongside Pet Shop Boys |
| 2003 | Mail Order Bride (film) | Soundtrack | Robert Capelli, Jr. | Starring Danny Aiello and Vincent Pastore. Music and lyric by Zhenya Rock |
| 2002 | Fastlane (TV) | Red Elvises | Josh Pate | Appeared in Episode 3, "Gone Native" |
| 2002 | Project: Valkyrie (film) | composer | Jeff Waltrowski | |
| 2001 | Heartbreakers (film) | recording | David Mirkin | Starring Sigourney Weaver and Jennifer Love Hewitt. Soundtrack recording |
| 1999 | Mike, Lu & Og | Soundtrack | Mikhail Aldashin | Music and lyric by Igor Uzov |
| 1998 | Melrose Place (TV) | Performance | Chip Chalmers | Season 7, Episode 14, "Suspicion". Music by Zhenya Rock, lyric by Z. Rock and I.Uzov |
| 1998 | Six-String Samurai (film) | Soundtrack | Lance Mungia | Famous for the line, "Nice shoes!" |
| 1998 | VH-1Behind the Music (TV) | Soundtrack | | Episode, "Taking It To The Streets" |
| 1998 | Penn & Teller's Sin City Spectacular (TV) | Performance | Bruce Gowers | "I Wanna See You Bellydance" music by Z.Rock, lyric by I. Uzov |
| 1997 | Pitch (film) | Soundtrack | Kenny Hotz, Spencer Rice | song "Three alley cats" sang by Zhenya Rock |

== Founding members ==
- Igor Yuzov
- Oleg Bernov
- Zhenya Rock (Kolykhanov)

== Current US touring band ==
- Igor Yuzov (Guitar, Vocals, Keyboard)
- Crazy Tomes (Guitar, Vocals, Bass, Keys, Harmonica) 2020-present
- Yuri Krivoshein (Guitar)
- Peter Grebenyuk (Bass-Balalaika, Guitar, Vocals, Keyboard)
- Ian Pond (Drums)

== See also ==
- Leningrad Cowboys
- Katzenjammer
- BossHoss
- Manu Chao
