= Mail Order Bride (2003 film) =

- Directed by: Robert Capelli Jr. Jeffrey Wolf
- Written by: Doug Bollinger; Robert Capelli Jr. Sergei Konenkov
- Produced by: Sergei Konenkov
- Starring: Danny Aiello; Ivana Miličević; Robert Capelli Jr.
- Cinematography: Sergei Kozlov; Ly Bolia
- Edited by: Martin Levenstein
- Music by: Igor & The Red Elvises
- Release date: 2003
- Running time: 85 minutes
- Country: United States
- Language: English

Mail Order Bride is a 2003 American comedy film written by Doug Bollinger, Robert Capelli Jr. and Sergei Konenkov, directed by Capelli and Jeffrey Wolf and starring Danny Aiello, Ivana Miličević and Capelli.

== Cast ==
- Danny Aiello as Tony Santini
- Robert Capelli Jr. as Anthony Santini
- Ivana Miličević as Nina/Butterfly
- Artie Lange as Tommy
- Slava Schoot as Ivan
- Vincent Pastore as Tootie
- Raymond Serra as Robber
- Marilyn J. Papa as Gina
- Jackie Martling as Jackie the Viking
- Steven Ogg as Pavel
- Kamal Ahmed as Buddha
- Frank Gorshin as Russian Doctor

== Reception ==
The film has a 29% rating on Rotten Tomatoes based on seven reviews.
