= Frankie Chan =

Hong Kong actor and musician (born 1951)

- Born: Chan Wing-yuk; 30 November 1951 (age 74); British Hong Kong
- Occupations: Actor; film director; film producer; martial artist; composer
- Years active: 1970–present
- Awards: Hong Kong Film Awards – Best Original Score; 1996 Fallen Angels

Chinese name
- Traditional Chinese: 陳勳奇
- Simplified Chinese: 陈勋奇
Transcriptions
Standard Mandarin
- Hanyu Pinyin: Chén Xūnqí
Yue: Cantonese
- Jyutping: can4 fan1 kei4

Franklin Chan Fan-kei (born 1951) is a Hong Kong-born Chinese martial artist, actor, film director, producer, action director, and composer.

Chan is best known to Hong Kong action cinema fans as the main antagonist in Sammo Hung's The Prodigal Son, in which he faces Yuen Biao in the final reel. Chan has starred in a number of modern action films, most notably Burning Ambition, Outlaw Brothers and Carry On Pickpocket.

Chan also composed music and scores for many films in the 1970s, 1980s and 1990s, including Writing Kung Fu (1979), Odd Couple (1979), The Young Master (1980), The Buddhist Fist (1980), Armour of God II: Operation Condor (1991), Chungking Express (1994) and Fallen Angels (1995).

In 2011, Chan directed Legendary Amazons, a film about the female Generals of the Yang clan.

== Filmography as director ==
- The Perfect Match (1982)
- Just for Fun (1983)
- Silent Romance (1984)
- Unforgettable Fantasy (1985)
- Goodbye My Love (1986)
- Sweet Surrender (1986)
- The Good, the Bad & the Beauty ( 鬼馬保鎌賊美人,1987)
- Criminal Hunter (1988)
- Angel of Return (1989)
- Outlaw Brothers (1990)
- Fun and Fury (1992)
- A Warrior's Tragedy (1993)
- A Warrior's Tragedy 2 (1993)
- The Wrath of Silence (1994)
- Oh! Yes Sir! (1994)
- Tragic Commitment (1995)
- How to Meet the Lucky Stars (1996)
- I.Q. Dudettes (2000)
- Live and Die in Chicago (2002)
- Legendary Amazons (2011)
- Impetuous Love in Action (2014)
- Super Model Fantasy (2019)
