= Impetuous Love in Action =

2014 Chinese-Hong Kong film by Frankie Chan

- Directed by: Frankie Chan
- Starring: Oscar Sun; Jade Lin; Kenneth Ma; Yushu; Frankie Chan; Irene Wan
- Release date: 23 May 2014 (China)
- Running time: 109 minutes
- Countries: China; Hong Kong
- Box office: US$0.28 million (China)

Impetuous Love in Action (Chinese: 緣來是遊戲) is a 2014 romantic comedy action film directed by Frankie Chan.

== Cast ==
- Oscar Sun
- Jade Lin
- Kenneth Ma
- Yushu
- Frankie Chan
- Irene Wan

== Reception ==
The film has grossed US$0.28 million at the Chinese box office.

== Comperation ==
This action and comedy was compared to Eddie Garcia & Bayani Agbayani's Sanggano't Sanggago.
