= Sibelle Hu =

Taiwanese actress, singer and TV personality

- Chinese: 胡慧中
- Born: 4 May 1958 (age 68); Taipei, Taiwan
- Other name: Hu Huizhong
- Occupations: Actress, singer, TV presenter
- Years active: 1975–1997, 2014
- Spouse: Patrick Ho (m. 1997)
- Children: 1

Sibelle Hu Hui-Chung (Chinese: 胡慧中; Wade–Giles: Hu Hui-chung; born 4 May 1958) is a Taiwanese actress, singer and TV personality who starred in both Taiwanese and Hong Kong movies. She acted in many movies in the 1980s and 1990s and retired in the late 1990s.

== Life ==
Hu graduated from Faculty of History of the National Taiwan University in 1981. In the beginning of her career, Hu mainly acted in romantic movies. She was thought to be the successor of Brigitte Lin. Her debut film, Your Smiling Face (歡顏) was the biggest-grossing Taiwanese film in Hong Kong. Hu's career focused on melodramatic romantic films including I sing I cry (我歌我泣), The Coldest Winter in Peking (皇天后土) (for which she was nominated for the Golden Horse as Best Actress in 1981). In 1985 she co-starred with Jackie Chan, Yuen Biao and Sammo Hung in My Lucky Stars (福星高照) and continued throughout most of the Lucky Stars series. Beginning in 1986, Hu often starred in action movies playing a police officer. Starting in 1988 she started acting in the movie series The Inspector Wears Skirts (霸王花). Hu was seriously burned in an explosion stunt during the filming of Devil Hunters, but eventually recovered.

Hu's career faded in the late 1990s, when she retired and married Patrick Ho, a businessman from Hong Kong. She has since been seen with her husband at various social functions, and in 2000 gave birth to her first child, Audrey Ho Ka Chun.

== Career ==
=== Filmography ===
- A Special Smile (歡顏) (1979)
- All's Well That Does Well (尋夢的孩子) (1979)
- Night News (1980)
- I Sing I Cry (我歌我泣) (1980)
- Flying Rainbow (1980)
- Love in a Big Land (1980)
- To You With Love (1980)
- Offend the Law of God (1980)
- The Unsinkable Miss Calabash (1981)
- The Juvenizer (1981)
- Chuan Qi Ren Wu (1981)
- The Coldest Winter in Peking (1981) - Lo Ling
- The Call of Duty (1981)
- Ma! Don't Die on My Back (1981)
- The King of Gambler (1981)
- Wei Ni Pao Tian Xia (1981)
- Kung Hei Fat Choy (瘋狂大發財) (1981) - Kao Hung-Yun
- Helpless Taste (1982)
- A Flower in the Storm (1982)
- Funny People (1982)
- Chao Ji Yong Shi (1982)
- Jie Yan Chuan (1982)
- Mao Pao De Xiao Niu (1982)
- Four Wolves (1983)
- The Lost Generation (1983) - Wong Heung
- I Love Lolanto (1984) - Da's Girlfriend
- The Little Cute Fellow (1984) - Juju
- Love Bittersweet (1984)
- The Master Strikes Back (1985) - Miss Hung
- My Lucky Stars (福星高照) (1985) - Swordflower / Chief Insp. Barbara Wu
- Twinkle, Twinkle Lucky Stars (夏日福星) (1985) - Swordflower / Chief Insp. Barbara Wu
- Inspector Chocolate (神探朱古力) (1986) - Su
- The Seventh Curse (1986) - Mrs. Lin
- Crazy Spirit (養鬼仔) (1987) - Alice Hwang
- The Inspector Wears Skirts (霸王花) (1988) - Madam Wu
- The Inspector Wears Skirts II (神勇飛虎霸王花) (1989) - Madam Wu
- The Yuppie Fantasia (1989)
- Pi Li Jing Hua [Emergency Police Lady] (霹靂警花) (1989)
- Devil Hunters (獵魔群英) (1989) - Madam Tong
- The Dragon Fighter (地頭龍) (1990)
- To Spy with Love!! (小心間諜) (1990) - Island 001
- Sleazy Dizzy (小偷阿星) (1990) - Bo Ling
- Fire Phoenix (橫衝直撞火鳳凰) (1990)
- Raid on Royal Casino Marine (The Inspector Wears Skirts III) (霸王花之皇家賭船) (1990) - Madam Wu
- Lethal Panther (驚天龍虎豹) (1990) - Betty Lee
- Magic Amethyst (魔幻紫水晶) (1990) - Lady Hai
- Ghost of the Fox (狐道) (1990)
- Bury Me High (衛斯理之霸王卸甲) (1991) - Nguen Van Vong
- The Queen of Gamble (表姐,妳玩野!) (1991) - Frances Li
- The Holy Virgin Versus the Evil Dead (1991) - Sgt. Hu
- The Roar of the Vietnamese (越青) (1991) - Wai Yin
- Who Cares (關人鬼事) (1991) - Police Officer
- Crystal Hunt (怒火威龍) (1991) - Superintendent Wu
- Dreaming the Reality (夢醒血未停) (1991) - Si Lan-Fa
- Fatal Mission (曝光人物) (1991) - Lady Cop
- Drugs Area (毒網) (1991)
- Ghost Punting (五福星撞鬼) (1992) - Madam Wu
- Special Group (1992) - Sheila Cho
- The Big Deal (偷神家族) (1992) - Super Canon
- The Mighty Gambler (勝者為王) (1992) - Chiang Hung
- China Heat (中華警花) (1992) - Tie Hua
- Fighting Fist or Death Warrant (霸道縱構) (1992) - Julia Cheung
- Lethal Contact (龍貓燒鬚) (1992)
- Fong Sai-yuk (方世玉) (1993) - Siu-wan
- Angel's Project (天使狂龍) (1993) - Chief Inspector
- Combat at Heaven Gate (決戰天門) (1993) - Fang Zhizhen
- Angel Terminators 2 (火種) (1993)
- The Way of the Lady Boxers (拉開鐵幕) (1993) - Big Aunt
- Rendez-vous of Japanese Kanto (關東太陽會) (1993)
- Chongqing Negotiation (1994) - Tong Xin
- Love Story or Butterfly Lovers (梁山伯与祝英台新传) (1994)
- Tai Chi II (The Tai Chi Boxer) (太極拳) (1996) - Hok Man / Jackie's Mother
- The Rising Sun and a Sudden Clap of Thunder (1997)
- Bodyguards Cryptic Crystal (Blu Crystal) (保镖之情人保镖) (television series- 20 episodes in all)
- Never Too Late (2017)
- A Beautiful Moment (2018)

=== Writing credits ===
Hu is credited as the writer of the 2002 film Life Show.

== Discography ==
Olive Tree (橄榄树) (1995)

1. 橄榄树 [Olive Tree]
2. 空白 - 胡慧中/刘家昌 [Blank Space]
3. 路有多长,思念就有多长 [How Long the Thoughts of the Journey]
4. 男的朋友,女的朋友 [Boyfriends Girlfriends]
5. 人世游 [A Journey of Life]
6. 为爱守候 [Waiting for Love]
7. 我不要一个假的情人 [I Don't Want a False Lover]
8. 我的心情就像风 [I Feel Like the Wind]
9. 星期天不敢想你 [I Dare Not Think of You on Sunday]
10. 雁南飞 [Wild Goose Flies to South]
11. 再见 [Goodbye]
12. 找个理由 [To Find a Reason]

Looking Back (回眸) (1993)

1. 空白 - 胡慧中/刘家昌
2. 男的朋友,女的朋友
3. 人世游
4. 路有多长,思念就有多长
5. 我不要一个假的情人
6. 雁南飞
7. 星期天不敢想你
8. 我的心情就像风
9. 找个理由
10. 再见

Luggage in the City (城市行囊) (1991)

1. 城市行囊 [Luggage in the City]
2. 一生如果只爱一个 [Life When You Love]
3. 爱情装在口袋里 [Love in a Pocket]
4. 女主角 [Heroine]
5. 今夜谁送我回家 [Please Drive Me Home Tonight]
6. 双面夏娃 [Both Sides of Eve]
7. 一个人的晚宴 [A Dinner]
8. 亲爱的别为我伤心 [Dear, Do Not Be Sad for Me]
9. 当客人离开的时候 [When All the Guests Are Gone]
10. 橄榄树 [Olive Tree]

Singles and compilations

- 那个人 [That Guy] - single in the album The Superstar Compilation 1 - Winter Fire (巨星精选1-冬天里的一把火)
- 为爱守候 [Waiting for Love] - duet with Qian Cheng (程前)
