= Bacon (album) =

Studio album by Igor & The Red Elvises
- Released: September 16, 2014
- Recorded: Cinque Ports
- Genre: Rock
- Label: Shoobah-Doobah Records
- Producer: Igor Yuzov

Igor & The Red Elvises chronology
| Live in Montana (2012) | Bacon (2014) |

Bacon is a 2014 album by Russian-American rock band Igor & The Red Elvises.

== Track listing ==
| No. | Title | Length |
|---|---|---|
| 1. | "Smell The Bacon" |
| 2. | "Beach Bum" |
| 3. | "Beer, Babes And BBQ" |
| 4. | "Girl From Nagasaki" |
| 5. | "Best Looking Girl" |
| 6. | "Ukrainian Reggae" |
| 7. | "Cosmic Love" |
| 8. | "Tiki Song" |
| 9. | "Monsters From Mars" |
| 10. | "Everybody Polka" |
| 11. | "Duel Part 1" |
| 12. | "Duel Part 2" |
| 13. | "Duel Part 3" |
| 14. | "Duel Part 4" |
| 15. | "Beer And Women (Russian)" |

== Credits ==
- Sarah Johnson – Flute, Saxophone
- Garrett Morris – Drums
- Oleg Schramm – Accordion, Keyboards, Organ
- Dregas Smith – Vocals
- Igor Yuzov – Bass, Guitar, Vocals
- All songs by Igor Yuzov
- Produced by Igor Yuzov
- Recorded by Oleg "Schramm" Gorbunov at Cinque Ports, Venice CA, 2013
