= Crystal Hunt (film) =

1991 Hong Kong film by Hsu Hsia

- Film poster
- Traditional Chinese: 怒火威龍
- Simplified Chinese: 怒火威龙
- Hanyu Pinyin: Nù Huǒ Wēi Lóng
- Jyutping: Nou6 Fo2 Wei1 Lung4
- Directed by: Hsu Hsia
- Screenplay by: Hung Hin-pang
- Produced by: Chui Fat
- Starring: Sibelle Hu; Donnie Yen; Carrie Ng; Ken Lo; Takado Fujimi
- Cinematography: Lui Kin-kwok; Chan Chuen-lai
- Edited by: Fong Bo-wa
- Production company: Cheung Yau Production
- Release date: 1991
- Running time: 89 minutes
- Country: Hong Kong
- Language: Cantonese

Crystal Hunt is a 1991 Hong Kong action film directed Hsu Hsia, who also appears in a supporting role in the film, and starring Sibelle Hu, Donnie Yen and Carrie Ng.

== Plot ==
In Hong Kong, former triad leader (Tin Ching) becomes intoxicated with Gu, so his daughter, Lisa (Carrie Ng) hires archeologist Professor Lau (Hsu Hsia) to find a Gold Crystal located on a saintly mountain in Khon Kaen Province Thailand that can cure him. There, Lau's assistant, Peter Tam (Tony Tam), who has been stealing antique for an American criminal, Stephen (John Salvitti), gets into a dispute with the latter and ends up being killed by Stephen's henchmen. Before being killed, Peter revealed he can steal the Gold Crystal for Stephen hoping the latter will spare him, so Stephen kidnaps Lau up to the saintly mountain and forces him to take the Gold Crystal. Before being kidnapped, Lau gave a call to former police officer, Brett Chan (Donnie Yen), the estranged boyfriend of his daughter, Wendy (Takado Fujimi).

When Brett calls Wendy, he figures Lau has gone missing and informs his old partner Inspector Wu (Sibelle Hu), who is also hunting Stephen after her partner, Officer Leung (Bryan Leung) was killed during a drug bust. Lisa, unable to contact Lau, sends her boyfriend Kwong (Ken Lo) to kidnap Wendy, who tells Lisa she is also looking for her father and Lisa lets her go. Wendy goes to Thailand and reconciles with Brett when she finds out Brett quit his job as a cop to be a tour guide for her before find a map to the saintly mountain before a portrait with her father and consults Wu. Lisa, who has been failing Wendy, arrives to Thailand with Kwong to check on her while Wu warns Lisa to watch out or she will arrest them. Wu then spots her informant who runs from her, but eventually catches up to him with the help of Brett and they learned Peter was killed by Stephen.

Brett and Wendy sneak into Stephen's factory while Lisa and Kwong tail them. Stephen catches them and they both fight Stephen and his gang. Lisa and Kwong were also spotted by Stephen's henchmen and flees while Brett and Wendy are cornered until Wu rescues them in a pickup truck after having fought off one of Stephen's henchmen earlier who tried to kill her in Brett's apartment.

The next morning, Brett and Wendy decides to enter the saintly mountain but Wu tries to stop them from illegally entering there. Lisa, Kwong and their henchmen arrive with the same intentions as Brett and Wendy and forces Brett, Wendy and Wu to lead them up. As they stop for a break, Stephen and his gang arrives and attacks them with an exploding remote controlled plane and a major gunfight erupts. Brett, Wendy and Wu find an opportunity to flee and get up to the saintly mountain and enter it where they find Lau dead, having been killed by traps. At this time, Lisa and Kwong also arrive and manages to take the Gold Crystal with Kwong suffering only a minor injury from being impaled one of the traps. When Lisa and Fung run from Wu, Brett and Wendy, Stephen and his gang also arrives and Kwong is shot dead by Stephen's henchmen and Wu, Brett, Wendy and Lisa runs as Stephen and his gang gives chase. As they arrive outside, Lisa teams up with Brett, Wendy, and Wu to fight Stephen and his henchmen. Wendy is then shot in the leg and Lisa is later killed after Stephen kicks her off a cliff. Brett, having killed one of Stephen's top henchmen (Michael Woods), joins Wu in fighting Stephen but are unable to gain the upper hand until Brett swings a log at Stephen's head several times before Wu kicks Stephen's skull and Brett delivers a final blow to Stephen and kills him. In the end, Wu and Brett were arrested for stealing the Gold Crystal despite they were no responsible for doing so.

== Cast ==
- Sibelle Hu as Inspector Wu (胡督察), a Thai police officer Khon Kaen Police Station
- Donnie Yen as Brett Chan (陳志良), a former police officer and Wu's former partner who quits his job to be a tour guide for his girlfriend, Wendy.
- Carrie Ng as Lisa (莉莎), a Hong Kong triad leader.
- Ken Lo as Kwong (阿光), Lisa's boyfriend and second in command.
- Takado Fujimi as Wendy Lau (劉詠雪), Brett's girlfriend and Professor Lau's daughter.
- John Salvitti as Stephen (史提芬), an American gang leader.
- Michael Woods as Stephen's henchmen who operates remote controlled planes.
- Kelvin Leto as Eddie (艾迪), one of Stephen's top henchmen.
- Tin Ching as Lisa's father who is former triad leader and becomes a victim of Gu.
- Tony Tam as Peter Tam ( 譚彼得), Professor Lau's assistant who steals antique for Stephen.
- Lung Sang as Officer Leung's colleague.
- Hsu Hsia as Professor Lau (劉教授), an archeologist.
- Chui Fat as the Thai police chief and Wu's superior officer.
- Bryan Leung as Officer Leung (梁Sir), Wu's partner. (guest star)
- Gordon Liu as Officer Leung's colleague. (guest star)
- Chu Tit-wo as a drug lord and Stephen's associate who Leung attempted to bust. (guest star)
- Ho Ka-kui as a company boss beaten up and threatened by Kwong.
- Wong Chi-keung as an office staff beaten up by Kwong.
- Choi Hin-cheung as one of the drug lord's thugs.
- Danny Tang as an office staff beaten up by Kwong.
- Hung Chi-sing as one of the drug lord's thugs.

== Critical reception ==
Tony Ryan of Far East Films gave the film a score of 3/5 stars noting the film's plothole and incoherence but praises some of the action sequences. JJ Bona of City on Fire gave the film a score of 7/10 praising the action choreography but criticizes the editing, storyline and continuity being "very bad."
