= The Inspector Wears Skirts =

1988 Hong Kong film by Wellson Chin

- Hong Kong film DVD cover
- Directed by: Wellson Chin
- Written by: Cheng Kam-fu
- Produced by: Jackie Chan
- Starring: Sibelle Hu; Cynthia Rothrock; Kara Hui; Regina Kent; Ellen Chan; Alex To
- Cinematography: Andrew Lau Wai-Keung; Au Gaam-Hung
- Edited by: Peter Cheung Yiu-Chung; Keung Chuen-Tak
- Music by: Noel Quinlan
- Production companies: Golden Harvest; Light Beam Productions
- Release date: 1988
- Running time: 91 minutes
- Country: Hong Kong
- Language: Cantonese

The Inspector Wears Skirts (Chinese: 霸王花, released in the United States as Top Squad and the Philippines as Lady Enforcer) is a 1988 Hong Kong action comedy film directed by Wellson Chin. The film was written by Cheng Kam-fu and produced by Jackie Chan. It stars Sibelle Hu, Cynthia Rothrock, Kara Hui, Regina Kent, Ellen Chan, and Alex To. In common with many other Hong Kong films, The Inspector Wears Skirts moves from genre to genre.

== Synopsis ==
The film revolves around a crack squad of female police officers who have to deal with harassment and a lack of respect from their male colleagues, personal issues as well as some serious criminals.

== Cast ==
- Sibelle Hu as Madam Wu
- Cynthia Rothrock as Madam Law
- Kara Hui as May
- Regina Kent as Aileen (credited as Jade Kan)
- Ellen Chan as Jean
- Alex To as Man
- Billy Lau as Nam
- Sandra Ng as Amy
- Ann Bridgewater as Karen
- Stanley Fung as Chief Kan
- Michael Chow as Peter
- Bill Tung as Commissioner Tung
- Jeff Falcon as Caucasian Jewel Thief
- Mars as Member of Tiger Squad
- Ken Lo as Member of Tiger Squad
- Shing Fui-On as Jewel Thief
- Benny Lai as Robber
- Ricky Hui as Canteen Chef

== Production ==
The film was inspired by the success of the Police Academy series.

== Release ==
The Inspector Wears Skirts was released in Hong Kong in 1988. In the Philippines, the film was released by First Films as Lady Enforcer on 11 August 1988.

== Home media ==
The film was released on Blu-ray on 23 December 2023.

== Sequels ==
The film was followed by three sequels:

- The Inspector Wears Skirts II (1989)
- The Inspector Wears Skirts 3 (1990)
- The Inspector Wears Skirts 4 (1992)
