= Bedroom Boogie =

Studio album by Igor & The Red Elvises
- Released: March 13, 2001
- Genre: Rock
- Label: Shoobah-Doobah Records
- Producer: Igor & The Red Elvises

Igor & The Red Elvises chronology
Your Favorite Band Live (2000)	Bedroom Boogie (2001)	Welcome to the Freakshow (2001)

Bedroom Boogie is a 2001 album released by the Igor & The Red Elvises.

== Track listing ==
1. Pilot John
2. Bedroom Boogie
3. Tell Me Who's Your Daddy
4. San Antone
5. Ready to Fly
6. Sticky Little Girl
7. I Will Come Back
8. If I Set You Free
9. Happy That I'm Straight
10. Naked Rock Star

All songs written by Zhenya Rock

Professional ratings
Review scores
Source	Rating
Allmusic	2.5/5 stars

== Personnel ==
- Zhenya Rock - Guitar, vocals, engineer
- Brad Houser - Bass
- Avi Sills - Drums
- Jay Swanson - Bass
- Jay Work - Saxophone
- Jeff King - Mastering
- Christy A. Moeller-Masel - Layout Design
