= Six-String Samurai =

Film by Lance Mungia

- Theatrical release poster
- Directed by: Lance Mungia
- Written by: Jeffrey Falcon; Lance Mungia
- Produced by: Michael Burns; Leanna Creel
- Starring: Jeffrey Falcon; Justin McGuire
- Cinematography: Kristian Bernier
- Edited by: James Frisa
- Music by: Igor & The Red Elvises; Brian Tyler
- Production company: HSX Films
- Distributed by: Palm Pictures
- Release date: 1998
- Running time: 91 minutes
- Country: United States
- Language: English
- Budget: $2 million USD

Six-String Samurai is a 1998 American post-apocalyptic action comedy film directed by Lance Mungia and starring Jeffrey Falcon and Justin McGuire. Brian Tyler composed the score for this film along with Igor & The Red Elvises, the latter providing the majority of the soundtrack.

The film was greeted with a great deal of excitement when shown at Slamdance in 1998, winning the Slamdance awards for best editing and cinematography, and gathering extremely favorable reviews from influential alternative, cult and indie film publications such as Fangoria, Film Threat and Ain't It Cool News. It is billed as a "post-apocalyptic musical satire".

In a limited theatrical release the film ran for several months in a few theaters, gaining a reputation as a minor cult film; having a budget of $2,000,000, it only made a mere $124,494 at the box offices. An intended trilogy has been discussed but not yet realized, just like the predicted launching of the career of the film's star, Jeffrey Falcon, a martial artist who had appeared in several Hong Kong action movies in the 1980s and early 1990s. While Mungia made several music videos, he did not direct another feature until the 2005 film The Crow: Wicked Prayer.

== Plot ==
In 1957, the Soviet Union attacks the United States with nuclear weapons, rendering most of the nation uninhabitable. The American government has collapsed with the exception of the haven known as Lost Vegas, ruled by King Elvis. The Red Army has been besieging Lost Vegas, but the lack of supplies over the years has relegated them to a gang of thugs. Forty years later King Elvis dies and radio disc jockey Keith Mortimer announces a call for all musicians to come to Lost Vegas to try to become the new King of Rock 'n' Roll. The ending of his message, "Vegas needs a new King!"

Buddy, a lone guitarist and swordsman, saves an unnamed boy he simply calls "Kid" from a group of bandits; consequently, as the Kid's mother was killed by the bandits he tags along with Buddy much to the latter's annoyance. As the duo travel through the desert wasteland, the heavy metal-playing Death stages several attempts to prevent Buddy from reaching Lost Vegas alive and claim the throne for himself. After enduring an attack by a bounty-hunting bowling team, Buddy and the Kid steal a car from another musician to continue their journey. They are later attacked on the road by bandits but escape.

When their car breaks down, Buddy and the Kid attempt to borrow a wrench from a suburban family, unaware that they are cannibals. Buddy leaves the Kid with them and takes off on foot. The Kid is about to be eaten but is spared after a group of Windmill People invade the home and the family flees with Buddy and the Kid's abandoned car after revealing they had a socket wrench needed to fix it. Buddy returns to defeat the Windmill People; he is reunited with the Kid and they continue their journey on an abandoned motorcycle. Meanwhile, Death has been killing off all other musicians coming across his path and taking their guitar picks as trophies.

Buddy and the Kid arrive in the town of Fallout, where he leaves the Kid with some locals and enters a bar to drink and spend time with a cheerleader. Death arrives but the Kid warns Buddy in time for them to flee. Before they do Buddy is approached by a young guitarist, whom he then humiliates. Continuing their travel, Buddy is attacked by the guitarist. Buddy unintentionally kills him in self defense, and, feeling guilty, he lays his sword down and walks away, but the Kid brings it back to him, still believing in Buddy and helping regain his confidence. Eventually the two begin to bond closer. Later, after they collapse in the desert, they are ambushed by Death and his bandmates, a trio of archers. Buddy slides the Kid and his guitar to safety while he battles the archers, but when the Kid is captured by a group of underground mutants, Buddy pursues the mutants to their lair. Death decides not to follow him as there are other musicians left to kill saving Buddy for last.

Buddy manages to save the Kid, and after returning to the surface, they find their road to Vegas blocked by the Red Army. After a grueling battle, Buddy is injured with the Kid dragging him to continue. Death finally catches up to them and engages Buddy in a guitar duel clashing their styles of music against one another; Buddy, Rock 'n' Roll and Death, Heavy Metal. When Buddy proves the better guitarist, an angry Death orders his bandmates to shoot him and the Kid with their bows. Buddy shields the Kid, getting shot in the back, but rises up and battles Death in a sword fight. Death mortally wounds Buddy in the end but the Kid discovers water is Death's weakness after spitting at him. The Kid then melts Death away with his water canteen.

With his defeat, Death's bandmates are in shock that the Kid bested him. They give him a card and tell him with admiration that if he ever needs them to call them, and they take their leave. The Kid, saddened by Buddy disappearing after dying, bravely accepts to finish Buddy's journey. He puts on his clothes and glasses, and carries his sword and guitar. With Lost Vegas now in sight, the Kid has completed Buddy's dream, and the film ends with him turning into Buddy, symbolizing he's inherited His spirit as a crowd cheers him from Lost Vegas.

== Cast ==
- Jeffrey Falcon as Buddy, a parody of Buddy Holly
- Justin McGuire as the Kid
- Stephane Gauger as Death, a parody of Slash

- Lex Lang as the voice of Death

- George L. Casillas as Mariachi, a parody of Ritchie Valens
- Jefferson Zuma Jay Wagner as Car Guy, a parody of Clint Eastwood
- Monti Ellison as the Head Pin Pal
- Kareem as Bowler #2
- Paul Szopa as Bowler #3
- Richard McGuire as the Cantina owner
- Gabrille Pimenter as Little Man
- Dan Barton as Ward Cleaver
- Lora Witty as Harriet Cleaver
- Rheagan Wallace as Peggy Cleaver
- Nathaniel Bresler as Rusty Cleaver
- John Sarkisian as the Russian General
- Euan MacDonald as Russian Lieutenant #1
- Henrik Henrickson as Russian Lieutenant #2
- Kim De Angelo as the Mother

Igor & The Red Elvises appear as themselves. Director Lance Mungia plays one of the Archers.

== Production ==
Lance Mungia said he went for a more fantastical approach with Six-String Samurai because he wanted to do something ambitious and Hitchcockian to avoid being lumped in with other low budget B movies. One evening when Mungia and Jeffrey Falcon were at a restaurant, Falcon asked Mungia how he saw through his thick glasses and tried them on with Mungia observing that Falcon bore a resemblance to Buddy Holly while wearing them. This led to the two collectively deciding to make the film a rock 'n' roll, samurai martial arts movie where the hero, villain, and supporting cast would be influenced by the rock 'n' roll genre.

=== Opening sequence distortion ===
The opening sequence has an intentionally distorted visual effect. The de-anamorphic visuals are a subtle "tribute" to the Chinese martial arts films (notably the films by Shaw Brothers) that often had their wide-screen opening sequences compressed to the 1.33:1 format of TV screens for VHS release.

=== Thematic elements ===
Throughout the film there are homages to many major musical movements in the United States. Buddy, the main character, is a symbol of the birth of rock 'n' roll. He shares the same clothing style of Buddy Holly, especially his horn-rimmed glasses.

Death, a character resembling Slash from Guns N' Roses, kills a character representing Jerry Lee Lewis during the film. Death also dispatches a mariachi band and another musician dressed country western style. His minions also torment a traveler dressed in hip hop fashion. Buddy also has a duel with a musician (wielding a ukulele) resembling Ritchie Valens, who died in the same 1959 plane crash as the original Buddy Holly. Death also kills rock music, through the death of Buddy. However, the last scene shows the child donning Buddy's clothing, suggesting that though rock 'n' roll is dead, there is still hope for the future.

The film also has references to the Wizard of Oz, loosely imitating the 1939 movie. A little person instructs Buddy to "follow the yellow brick road". Lost Vegas, seen from the distance, looks like the Emerald City. Death is obsessed with a specific object, Buddy's guitar pick, much like the Wicked Witch trying to get Dorothy's red slippers. Finally, Death is killed when sprayed with water, as was the Wicked Witch. When Buddy dies, his body disappears, leaving only his clothes for the kid to take, again like the Wicked Witch.

== Soundtrack ==
Six-String Samurai: Original Motion Picture Soundtrack

Soundtrack album by Brian Tyler and Igor & The Red Elvises
- Released: August 25, 1998
- Recorded: USMP Studios
- Genres: Rockabilly; surf rock; film score
- Length: 62:26
- Labels: Palm Pictures; Rykodisk
- Producer: Brian Tyler

Brian Tyler chronology
Bartender (1997)	Six-String Samurai: Original Motion Picture Soundtrack (1998)	The Settlement (1999)

Igor & The Red Elvises chronology
I Wanna See You Bellydance (1998)	Six-String Samurai: Original Motion Picture Soundtrack (1998)	Russian Bellydance (1999)

Professional ratings
Review scores
Source	Rating
AllMusic	4/5 stars

Six-String Samurai: Original Motion Picture Soundtrack is the original soundtrack to the film, released by Rykodisc on August 25, 1998. It features the score by Brian Tyler and Igor & The Red Elvises, along with select dialogue tracks from the film. The Enhanced CD release includes the film's trailer.

=== Track listing ===
All tracks are written by Brian Tyler, except where noted.

No.	Title	Writer(s)	Artist	Length
1.	"United States of Russia"		Igor & The Red Elvises	1:04
2.	"Neverland"		Brian Tyler	0:12
3.	"Love Pipe"		Igor & The Red Elvises	3:17
4.	"A Mother's Hand / Buddy"		Brian Tyler	1:01
5.	"Fly Away Little Butterfly"		Brian Tyler	0:35
6.	"Kill 200 Men" (Dialogue)		Lex Lang	0:11
7.	"Boogie on the Beach"		Igor & The Red Elvises	2:47
8.	"I Do Not Like Rock and Roll" (Dialogue)		John Sarkisian	0:11
9.	"Hungarian Dance #5"	Johannes Brahms	Igor & The Red Elvises	3:05
10.	"Arrowed Kid / Bowlers on the Floor" (Dialogue)		Lex Lang	1:07
11.	"Rock N' Rolling Ourselves to Death / Jerry's Got the Squeeze Box"		Igor & The Red Elvises	2:19
12.	"Lonely Highway of Love / Scorchi Chornie"		Igor & The Red Elvises	4:38
13.	"My Darling Lorraine"		Igor & The Red Elvises	2:32
14.	"Astro"		Brian Tyler	1:30
15.	"Follow the Yellow Brick Road / Leech"		Igor & The Red Elvises	0:43
16.	"See You Around Kid / Siberia"		Igor & The Red Elvises	3:29
17.	"Good Golly Miss Molly"		Igor & The Red Elvises	3:05
18.	"My Love Is Killing Me"		Igor & The Red Elvises	5:47
19.	"Sacred Funeral"		Brian Tyler	1:01
20.	"Relentless Sun"		Brian Tyler	1:47
21.	"Over the Hill"		Brian Tyler	0:47
22.	"Bring His Guitar to Me / Sahara Burn"		Brian Tyler	0:55
23.	"A Boy and His Spirit"		Brian Tyler	1:00
24.	"If You Were Me, You'd Be Good-Looking / Surfing in Siberia"		Igor & The Red Elvises	4:48
25.	"Dragging a Fallen Hero"		Brian Tyler	1:04
26.	"Nice Tuxedo / Show Down at Not Okay Corral"		Brian Tyler	2:11
27.	"Bend Before the Ways of Heavy Metal / Dueling Guitars"		Brian Tyler	0:58
28.	"Dream March"		Brian Tyler	1:01
29.	"The Great Battle"		Brian Tyler	2:46
30.	"End of a Hero / Finale"		Brian Tyler	2:24
31.	"On My Way to Vegas"		Brian Tyler	2:24
Total length:				62:26

Enhanced CD track
No.	Title	Length
32.	"Video Trailer"

== Critical reception ==
Six-String Samurai received mixed reviews, with a 57% approval rating on Rotten Tomatoes, based on 21 reviews.

Film Threat gave the film a perfect score of five stars. Leonard Klady of Variety called the film "A rock 'n' roll Mad Max served up Cantonese style, this is one wildly original and highly entertaining American indie with genuine commercial appeal." Peter Stack of the San Francisco Chronicle commented on his review that "If the film didn't have an underlying intelligence, it would soon be irritating -- it's too cartoonish and one-dimensional. But Falcon, an ace martial-arts practitioner, is dazzling as the nerdy main attraction, equally adept at sword fighting and guitar picking." Laurie Stone of The Village Voice wrote on her review: "There's one charming sequence, with vaudeville grace and tragicomedy worthy of Beckett, but the rest of the film, even with startling visual effects and some impish humor, is repetitious and derivative, playing like an endless commercial for bullet-hole chic."

== Home media ==
Six-String Samurai was released on a non-anamorphic DVD by Palm Pictures in March 1999. Extras included the theatrical trailer and two music videos by Igor & The Red Elvises.

In March 2021, it was announced that the film would be receiving its first ever HD release in a Blu-ray/Ultra HD Blu-ray combo-pack from Vinegar Syndrome. Newly created extras include commentaries with Mungia and cinematographer Kristian Bernier, as well as a brand new extended length making-of documentary directed by Mungia and Elijah Drenner.

== Other media ==
In September, 1998, a single Six String Samurai comic was released from Rob Liefeld's Awesome Entertainment. Written by Liefeld and Matt Hawkins, it featured art by 'Awesome' artists Dan Fraga and John Stinsman. A continuation rather than an adaptation, the plot summary from the comic is as follows:

In this alternate universe, in 1957 the Russians took the United States by nuclear force. Only one piece of the American frontier remained free, a patch of land known as Lost Vegas. Through this desert wasteland wanders the "six string samurai," a latter-day Buddy Holly who handles a guitar or a sword with equal skill. He's a man on a collision course with destiny: It seems that King Elvis, who ruled over the land of Vegas for forty years, has finally taken his last curtain call and the throne now stands empty. But it's a rough road to the big city and the body count is likely to be high, as demonstrated in this postapocalyptic future with a beat we can dance to.

== Cultural references ==
- In the RPG Fallout: New Vegas, an achievement called "New Vegas Samurai" is available with an image based on Six String Samurai's movie poster. It is acquired when the player deals more than 10,000 points of damage with melee weapons.
- The intro to the song “Holy Diver Pt.2” by Pannuci's Pizza is a quote from Head Pin Pal saying “Nice Tuxedo. Nice Tuxedo to die in!”
