= Surfing in Siberia =

Studio album by Igor & The Red Elvises
- Released: February 1997
- Genre: Rock
- Label: Shoobah-Doobah Records
- Producer: Red Elvises

Igor & The Red Elvises chronology
Grooving To The Moscow Beat (1996)	Surfing in Siberia (1997)	I Wanna See You Bellydance (1998)

Surfing in Siberia is a 1997 album by the Igor & The Red Elvises.

== Track listing ==
1. Surfing in Siberia
2. Here I Am in Hollywood
3. Siberia
4. Hungarian Dance #5
5. Don't Stop the Dance
6. Give Me One More Chance
7. Love Pipe
8. Jerry's Got the Squeeze Box
9. I Wanna Rock'n'Roll All Night
10. My Darling Lorraine
11. Three Alley Cats
12. Rock'n'Roll Music
13. Ukrainian Dance #13

Professional ratings
Review scores
Source	Rating
AllMusic	3/5 stars

== Credits ==
- Igor Yuzov - Guitar, Vocals
- Zhenya Kolykhanov - Guitar, Vocals
- Oleg Bernov - Guitar (Bass), Vocals
- Avi Sills - Drums, Vocals
- Barry Conley - Mixing
- Gazelle Gaignaire - Photography
- Jeff King - Engineer, Mastering, Mixing, Producer
- Mike Melnick - Engineer
