= Shake Your Pelvis =

Studio album by Igor & The Red Elvises
- Released: April 11, 2000
- Genre: Eurodance
- Label: Shoobah-Doobah Records
- Producer: Igor & The Red Elvises

Igor & The Red Elvises chronology
Better Than Sex (1999)	Shake Your Pelvis (2000)	Your Favorite Band Live (2000)

Shake Your Pelvis is a 2000 album released by Igor & The Red Elvises.

== Track listing ==
1. Everybody Disco (Igor)
2. Beat of a Drum (Zhenya)
3. Girl from Malibu (Zhenya)
4. 200 Lbs Of Pure Love (Igor)
5. Girls Gonna Boogie Tonight (Zhenya)
6. We Got the Groove (Igor)

Heroic Interlude

7. Rocketship (Zhenya)
8. Colors of Rainbow (Igor)
9. Techno Surfer (Zhenya)
10. City of Angels (lyrics by John Montobello/ music by Igor and Oleg)
11. Cosmic Surf (Zhenya)

Romantic Interlude

12. Good Guys (Igor)

Professional ratings
Review scores
Source	Rating
Allmusic	3/5 stars

== Credits ==
Igor: vocals, guitars, bass
Zhenya: vocals, guitars, guitar synth, harmonica, violin, piano, bass, digital editing
Oleg: vocals, bass, keyboard, percussion, programming, digital editing
Avi: vocals, drums, percussion, cheerful spirit

Guest Performers:
Dianne Sellers - vocal
Letitia Jones - vocal
Shana Halligan - vocal
Galina Shlimovich - violin
Oleg "Schramm" Gorbunov - Hammond organ
Dmitry Mamokhin - trumpet
ххeo Chelyapov - saxophone
Jay Work - saxophones
Vladimir Tchekan - trombone
Iouri Ionidi - guitar

Recorded at Shooba-Doobah Studios, Venice, CA November 1999 - January 2000
Engineers: Doctor Z and Professor O.
Mixed at Shooba-Doobah Studios
Engineers: Barry Connely, Jeff King, Doctor Z and Professor O.
Mastered at Paramount Recording Studios by King himself
Photography by Tanya Thuringer
Design and layout by Christy A. Moeller-Masel
Avi Sills plays DW (Oleg's first car was VW)
