= Regina Kent =

Hong Kong actress (1967–1999)

- Born: 4 September 1967; Penang, Malaysia
- Died: 16 August 1999 (aged 31); Hong Kong
- Other name: Jade Kan
- Years active: 1985–1990

Chinese name
- Traditional Chinese: 簡慧真
- Simplified Chinese: 简慧真
Transcriptions
Standard Mandarin
- Hanyu Pinyin: Jǐan Hùizhén
Yue: Cantonese
- Jyutping: Gan5 Wai6 Zan1

Regina Kent (September 4, 1967 – August 16, 1999) was a Hong Kong actress who acted in some notable Hong Kong films in the 1980s.

== Career ==
=== Acting ===
Kent starred as May in the 1986 film Legacy of Rage alongside Brandon Lee and Michael Wong. She then played Peggy Lung in the 1987 film A Better Tomorrow 2 alongside Chow Yun-fat and Dean Shek. She appeared in two Jackie Chan films, the 1987 film Project A Part II and 1989 film Miracles. She played a Nun in the 1989 film Vampire vs Vampire along with Lam Ching-ying. Kent retired from acting at age 23, in 1990.

== Death ==
On August 16, 1999, Kent died of a brain tumor at the age of 31.

== Filmography ==
=== Film ===
- Journey of the Doomed (1985)
- Grow Up in Anger (1986)
- Love Me Vampire (1986)
- Legacy of Rage (1986)
- Project A Part II (1987)
- A Better Tomorrow 2 (1987)
- Ghost in the House (1988)
- The Inspector Wears Skirts (1988)
- Proud and Confidence (1989)
- The Inspector Wears Skirts II (1989)
- Chinese Cop-Out (1989)
- Club Girls (1989)
- Miracles (1989)
- Vampire Vs. Vampire (1989)
- Gangland Odyssey (1990)
