= Jeffrey Falcon =

American actor

- Born: 1962 (age 62–63); United States
- Occupation(s): Martial artist, actor

Chinese name
- Traditional Chinese: 傑夫
- Simplified Chinese: 杰夫
Transcriptions
Standard Mandarin
- Hanyu Pinyin: Jié fū
Yue: Cantonese
- Jyutping: Git^{6} Fu^{1}

Jeffrey Falcon (born 1962) is an American martial artist, actor and filmmaker. A member of the US Wushu team, Falcon began his career in Hong Kong action cinema, before returning to the United States to write and star in the cult classic film Six-String Samurai.

== Biography ==
Falcon initially studied taekwondo, but in the 1980s began practicing wushu. He won several state and national championships in California, between 1982 and 1983. In 1984, he studied with the Beijing Wushu Team under coach Wu Bin. He was a member of the US National Wushu Team from 1985 to 1988. He represented the United States at the 1st International Invitational Wushu Championships in Xi'an in August 1985. He later became a wushu coach, and graduated from Beijing Sport University.

Falcon began his film career in Chinese-language martial arts films. While living in Taiwan, teaching English and martial arts, he was noticed by Jackie Chan after a television performance. Falcon was then invited to appear in a film in Hong Kong, which led to subsequent film work.

In total, he appeared in seventeen action films, including Outlaw Brothers and The Inspector Wears Skirts. He adopted the Chinese stage name Git Foo (Chinese: 傑夫; pinyin: Jié fū; Jyutping: Git^{6} Fu^{1}; lit. 'Jeff'). Although Falcon sought to continue his studies in Buddhism and Chinese, he was dissatisfied with being typecast as a villain and in smaller roles. He returned to the United States to pursue larger acting roles.

In California, Falcon began working with Lance Mungia in 1996 to develop the script for a samurai movie, which eventually became Six-String Samurai. After Mungia observed one night that Falcon looked like Buddy Holly, the two developed the idea of incorporating rock and roll into the film. In addition to starring as Buddy in the film, Falcon did fight choreography, production design, and costume design.

According to a 2003 interview with fellow Hong Kong martial artist and actor, John Ladalski, Falcon retired from films and returned to China, where he married and pursued other work.

== Filmography ==
- Operation Pink Squad (1988)
- The Inspector Wears Skirts (1988)
- Prince of the Sun (1989)
- The Inspector Wears Skirts 2 (1989)
- Burning Ambition (1989)
- Blonde Fury (1989)
- The Outlaw Brothers (1990)
- Lethal Contact (1992)
- Caged Beauties (1992)
- The Way of the Lady Boxers (1993)
- Rape in Public Sea (1993)
- Happy Partner (1993)
- Oh! Yes Sir! (1994)
- Six-String Samurai (1998) - Also screenwriter and fight choreographer
