= Your Favorite Band "Live" At The Great American Music Hall =

Your Favorite Band Live

Live album by Igor & The Red Elvises
- Released: September 12, 2000
- Recorded: March 26, 1999 at Great American Music Hall
- Label: Shoobah-Doobah
- Producer: Igor & The Red Elvises

Igor & The Red Elvises chronology
| Shake Your Pelvis (2000) | Your Favorite Band Live (2000) | Bedroom Boogie (2001) |

Your Favorite Band Live is a live album by Russian-American band Igor & The Red Elvises.

== Track listing ==
Disc one
| No. | Title | Length |
|---|---|---|
| 1. | "El Niño" | 4:34 |
| 2. | "Red Lips, Red Eyes, Red Stockings" | 3:22 |
| 3. | "Telephone Call from Istanbul" | 4:37 |
| 4. | "Gypsy Heart" | 3:41 |
| 5. | "Voodoo Doll" | 3:46 |
| 6. | "200 Flying Girls" | 3:21 |
| 7. | "Flaming Cheese" | 7:14 |
| 8. | "Schorchi Chorniye" | 5:46 |

Disc two
| No. | Title | Length |
|---|---|---|
| 1. | "Lovepipe" | 3:27 |
| 2. | "Closet Disco Dancer" | 3:52 |
| 3. | "Stewardess in Red" | 3:37 |
| 4. | "Blue Moon" | 4:30 |
| 5. | "Wild Man" | 2:58 |
| 6. | "Sad Cowboy Song" | 6:24 |
| 7. | "Rocket Man" | 3:39 |
| 8. | "I Wanna See You Bellydance" | 5:33 |

== Credits ==
Recorded live on March 26, 1999 at the Great American Music Hall, San Francisco, CA.

Mixed and mastered at Shoobah-Doobah Studios by Oleg "Schramm" Gorbunov.

- Igor Yuzov - Vocals, guitar
- Oleg Bernov - Vocals, bass
- Zhenya Kolykhanov - Vocals, guitar
- Avi Sills - Drums
