= Better Than Sex (album) =

Studio album by Igor & The Red Elvises
- Released: March 3, 1999
- Genre: Rock
- Label: Shoobah-Doobah Records
- Producer: Igor & The Red Elvises

Igor & The Red Elvises chronology
Russian Bellydance (1999)	Better Than Sex (1999)	Shake Your Pelvis (2000)

Better Than Sex is a 1999 album by the Igor & The Red Elvises.

== Track listing ==
All songs written by Zhenya Kolykhanov.

1. Red Lips, Red Eyes, Red Stockings
2. Hanky Panky Kind of Love
3. Wild Man
4. Painted Love
5. Joint Was Jumping
6. Wonderful Night
7. To the Top
8. Strip Joint is Closed
9. Closet Disco Dancer
10. Jumping Cat Boogie
11. Mamasita

Professional ratings
Review scores
Source	Rating
Allmusic	3/5 stars

== Credits ==
- Igor Yuzov - vocals, guitar
- Zhenya Kolykhanov - Guitar, Piano, Vocals, Cover Art
- Oleg Bernov - Bass, vocals
- Avi Sills - drums
- Chelyapov Edelman - Clarinet, Piano, Saxophone
- Galina Glek-Shlimovich - Violin
- Chris Golden - Guitar (Bass), Contrabass
- Leo Groovitz - Clarinet, Saxophone
- Letitia Jones - Vocals
- Dmitri Mamokhin - Trumpet
- Dianne Sellers - Vocals
- Roman Volodarsky - Violin
- Alexander Zhyroff - Cello
- Barry Connely - Engineer
- Svetoslav Lazarov - Engineer
- Duncan MacFarlane - Mastering, Mixing
- Christy A. Moeller-Masel - Layout, design
