= Welcome to the Freakshow (Red Elvises album) =

Welcome To The Freakshow

Studio album by Igor & The Red Elvises
- Released: March 13, 2001
- Genre: Rock
- Label: Shoobah-Doobah Records
- Producer: Igor & The Red Elvises

Igor & The Red Elvises chronology
Bedroom Boogie (2001)	Welcome To The Freakshow (2001)	Rokenrol (2002)

Welcome To The Freakshow is a 2001 album by the Igor & The Red Elvises.

== Track listing ==
1. Space Cowboy
2. Welcome to the Freakshow
3. A Kegga Beer and Potato Chips
4. Sex in Paradise
5. Million Miles
6. Cha-Cha-Cha
7. Running Away
8. Groovie
9. Show Is Over

All songs written by Igor (Gosha) Yuzov

Professional ratings
Review scores
Source	Rating
Allmusic	3/5 stars

== Credits ==
Igor: Vocals, guitars, bass, keyboards, percussion.
Andrei Baranov - drums
Mamoxa – trumpet
Jey Works – sax
Galiana Shlimovich – violin
Rouslan Valonen – keyboards
Back up vocals: Vladimir Goncharov, Nanduh Yuzov de Medeiros
Rouslan Valonen & Oleg Bernov recorded the tracks then Rouslan mixed
Recorded at Shoobah-Doobah Records in Venice, California, in December 2000
Photography by Theo Fridlizius
Package design by Christy A. Moeller-Masel
