= Give Us a Break (Limpopo album) =

Give Us A Break

Studio album by Igor & The Red Elvises
- Released: 1995
- Genre: Rock
- Label: Folk'n'Roll Records

Igor & The Red Elvises chronology
Crazy Russian Folk And Roll (1995)	Give Us A Break (1995)	Grooving To The Moscow Beat (1996)

Professional ratings
Review scores
Source	Rating
Allmusic	4/5 stars

Give Us A Break was a 1995 album by Russian folk rock group Limpopo, who later became Igor & The Red Elvises.

== Track listing ==
1. When My Dear Mother Was Seeing Me Off to The Army
2. Volga Boatmen
3. Half-Moon
4. Soldiers, The Brave Lads
5. Rowanberry Tree
6. Seni
7. Steppe
8. Odessa-Mama
9. Epic Song
10. Along the Street
11. By the Meadow
12. Nagaika
13. Wooden Log
14. Lemons Odessa-Mama
15. Luchina
16. Down Along the River
