= I Wanna See You Bellydance =

Studio album by Igor & The Red Elvises
- Released: July 28, 1998
- Genre: Rock
- Label: Shoobah-Doobah Records
- Producer: Igor & The Red Elvises

Igor & The Red Elvises chronology
Surfing In Siberia (1997)	I Wanna See You Bellydance (1998)	Six-String Samurai (1998)

Professional ratings
Review scores
Source	Rating
Allmusic	3/5 stars

I Wanna See You Bellydance is a 1998 album by Igor & The Red Elvises.

== Track listing ==
1. Rocketman
2. Hello from Istanbul
3. I Wanna See You Bellydance
4. Voodoo Doll
5. Gypsy Heart
6. El Nino
7. Hawaii
8. I'm not that Kind of Guy
9. Sad Cowboy Song
10. Stewardess in Red
11. 200 Flying Girls (Rocketman's Dream)
12. All I Wanna Do (is make love to you)
13. After the Carnival

== Credits ==
- Zhenya - guitars, vocals
- Avi - drums, vocals
- Igor - vocals, guitar
- Oleg - bass, vocals

Guest performers:

- Dimitri Mamokhin - trumpet
- Gary Herbig - Sax and flute
- Leo "Groovitz" Chelyapov - clarinet
- Skip Waring - trombone
- Chris Golden - fretless bass
- Recorded at USMP Studios, Hollywood, California, under the watchful ear of Svet Lazarov
- Art and design by Human Fly Graphics / Go Man Go Design
- With special guest Pain-in-the-ass "Art Director" Oleg Bernov
