= Executioners from Shaolin =

1977 Hong Kong film by Lau Kar-leung

- Hong Kong theatrical poster
- Directed by: Lau Kar-leung
- Written by: Ngai Hong
- Produced by: Mona Fong
- Starring: Chen Kuan-tai; Li-Li Li; Wong Yue; Lo Lieh; Gordon Liu
- Cinematography: Lo Yun-Cheng
- Edited by: Chiang Hsing-Lung
- Music by: Frankie Chan
- Distributed by: Shaw Brothers Studio
- Release date: 16 February 1977 (Hong Kong)
- Running time: 98 minutes
- Country: Hong Kong
- Languages: Mandarin; Cantonese

Executioners from Shaolin (Chinese: 洪熙官; pinyin: Hóng Xīguān; Wade–Giles: Hung Hsi-kuan) is a 1977 Hong Kong kung fu film directed by Lau Kar-leung. The film begins after the massacre of the Shaolin students with Hung hsi Kuan escaping with his life. He meets Fang Yung Chun, and the two soon get married and have a child all while Hung prepares for revenge against Pai Mei, who killed the Shaolin Chief Abbott. As Hung prepares to challenge Pei Mei, failing twice. His son, Hung Wen-ting steps in to avenge his father with the martial arts skills passed down from both his parents.

Executioners from Shaolin was one of the many martial arts films from Hong Kong in the 1970s. It followed the trend for kung fu films which began in 1970 and more specifically, the trend of Shaolin kung fu-themed films which began to be released more since 1974. The film borrows from folk legends from Chinese culture, such as a mythical Southern variation of the Shaolin temple and the stories of martial artists like Hung Hei-gun. The film was produced by Shaw Brothers Studio and was both directed and featured action choreography from Lau Kar-leung. It has been released in the United States as Shaolin Executioners and Executioners of Death.

The film received positive reviews in retrospective books on Hong Kong or martial arts films such as The Encyclopedia of Martial Arts Movies (1995) and The Hong Kong Filmography, 1977-1997 (2000). Stephen Teo, in The Cinema of Hong Kong: History, Arts, Identity (2000) described it as "a key work" that extended the kung fu film beyond the cliches of master and disciple stories from the late 1960s into what he described as "greener fields of gender politics, father and son relationships and explorations of fight style allied with personality and sexuality."

== Plot ==
Opening crawl: "Having learned that the revolutionaries were using Shaolin Temple as an undercover, the Manchurian Count ordered Priest Pai Mei and his top disciple Kao Tsin Chung, Governor of Kwangtung and Kwangsi, to raid the shaolin Temple. They surrounded the Temple and set fire to it. In an attempt to rescue his disciples, Priest Chi Shan enter into a crucial duel with Priest Pai Mei."

The title scene is a battle between Pai Mei and Master Chi Shan in an empty red backdrop. Here we get the first display of Pai Mei's mastery of internal kung-fu techniques that allow him to retract his privates into his groin. After using his body protection techniques to ward off a clawing attack to the face, he traps a kick to the groin from Master Zhishan and delivers his own coup de grâce.

Master Zhishan's vision blurs as the scene changes to a more realistic scene of the aftermath of the temple's destruction. Pai Mei's protégé, area governor Kao Tsin-chung and his army, chase the fleeing ex-students of Shao Lin. Tung Chin-chin, after watching waves of other students fall to the pursuing army's arrows, makes a heroic last stand to divert their attention. He falls to a hail of arrows, crushing the throats of the soldiers he is closest to. It is left to Hung Hsi-Kuan to lead the remaining students to safety.

They join an itinerant opera group which travels from town to town on iconic red junks as a front for anti-Qing forces. Along the way he encounters the comely Fang Yung-Chun, herself a master of the Crane style. Together, they have a son, whom both of them train. When area governor and student of Pai Mei, orders the destruction of the red junks, the couple retreat to a modest home where they raise their son and Hong begins mastering the Tiger style of kung fu in preparation for challenging Pai Mei.

After a decade of training, Hsi-Kuan goes to face Pai Mei, defeating several of his henchmen before retreating from his temple stronghold. Along the way, he discovers Pai Mei's weakness: he's vulnerable between one and three o' clock. Hung trains with renewed zeal on a sophisticated life-size bronze dummy fitted with grooves representing acupuncture meridians along its surface. By releasing a vessel in the head, metal balls cascade along these grooves so that he can snatch them to train his speed and accuracy. Still, he refuses to integrate his wife's Crane style, to his ultimate detriment.

In the final act, Hung goes to confront Pai Mei at his temple once again. He uses his training in vital point striking to catch Pai Mei off-guard. But again, he gets his foot trapped in Pai Mei's groin. Pai Mei tells Hung that he moves his vulnerable point up and down at will. After incapacitating Hung, Pai Mei tells the governor to keep him alive, only for Hung to kill the governor as he comes near. Pai Mei kills him with a swift but powerful blow.

Wen-Ding returns to avenge his father's death having been forced to synthesize his father's Tiger style with the crane style his mother taught him. Once again, he too lands in battle with Pai Mei, getting his foot trapped in Pai Mei's groin. But when Pai Mei goes to break Wen-Ding's leg, he jumps on Pai Mei's shoulders piggyback-style. Wen-Ding rips off Pai Mei's topknot, smashes him on the now unprotected crown of his head and, as his eyes are startled open, blinds him with a brutal dual jab in the eyes. They both tumble down the temple steps as the ending explains, "A combination of Tiger and Crane kung fu is what finally killed Pai Mei."

== Cast ==
- Chen Kuan-tai as Hung hsi Kuan
- Lo Lieh as Pai Mei
- Wong Yue as Hong Wen-ding
- Lily Li as Fang Yung-chun
- Cheng Kang-yeh as Hsiao Hu
- Gordon Lau Kar-fai as Tung Chien-chen
- Tien Ching as Wang Yeh
- Kong To as Kao Chin-chung
- Kao Chin-chung as Yung-chun's Uncle
- Lee Hoi-sang as Chi San

== Production ==
Executioners from Shaolin is a Shaw Brothers Studio film production directed by Lau Kar-leung. Lau Kar-Leung entered the film industry by 1949. He worked in choreographing action in films. Lau Kar-Leung began working for Shaw Brothers in the 1960s.

Executioners from Shaolin was written by Ni Kuang, who had written numerous martial arts, detective and romance novels from 1958 to 1971. After writing his first screenplay with The One-Armed Swordsman (1967), which also featured action choreography from Lau, he continued to write scripts for Shaw Brothers and several other film companies in Hong Kong and Taiwan from the 1960s to the 1970s. Prior to Executioners from Shaolin, he wrote screenplays for earlier Lau Kar-leung films such as The Spiritual Boxer (1975) and Challenge of the Masters (1976).

After 1974, the number of Shaolin kung fu-themed films arrived from Hong Kong, generally around the theme of rebellions from Shaolin monks against Manchu rule. Film critic Ng Ho wrote in 1980 that over half of the kung fu and wuxia films made in Hong Kong and Taiwan at least mention the Shaolin Monastery and the legends surrounding it. In Executioners from Shaolin, the film refers to a later mythical southern incarnation of the temple. Executioners from Shaolin is based on legendary figures from China. Hong Xiguan (aka Hung Hei-gun) is credited as the inventor of Hung Ga one of the most well-known of the southern styles of kung fu. Chen Kuan-tai portrays Hung Hei-gun in Executioners of Shaolin and had previously done so Chang Cheh's Heroes Two (1974).

Executioners of Shaolin was part of a string of 18 martial arts films Lau directed for Shaw Brothers. Lau also provided the film with its fight choreography. The film showcases a combination of kung fu styles of Tiger Claw and the White Crane Boxing. In film, White Crane boxing is often used to show a long-distance and elongated attack form. The monks at the real Shaolin Temple did train in martial arts fighting with their hands and feet in the 16th century. They often tried to strike acupuncture points, which is a technique seen in Executioners from Shaolin.

== Release ==
Executioners from Shaolin was released in Hong Kong on February 16, 1977. In the United States, it was released theatrically in 1979 and on television in the United States as Executioners of Death and on VHS in 1987 as Shaolin Executioner.

In 2003, Wendy Kan of Variety wrote that studios have courted Run Run Shaw attempting to release films from the Shaw Brothers library or even purchase the studio, with Shaw being hesitant to give up control of the company or release the library on video due to rampant piracy. The Shaw Brothers library of films was sold to Malaysian company Celestial Pictures in 2000. In 2003, Celestial Pictures signed a deal with Miramax to distribute 50 films on home video in the United States, Canada, Australia and New Zealand for home video, television and other digital media distribution, including Executioners from Shaolin. It was released on blu-ray in a box set titled Shawscope Volume One in 2021 from Arrow Video.

== Reception ==
From contemporary reviews, Verina Glaessner wrote in her overview of Hong Kong films of the year that said that Lau Kar-leung "proves himself a credit to his mentor with a film that mines a fine vein of humor without undercutting the seriousness of the action" with Executioners of Shaolin.

In retrospective reviews, the authors of The Encyclopedia of Martial Arts Movies (1995) found the film "ambitious and audactious" even if some plot elements such as the reason behind Hung's failure and Wen-ting's success were not clear. John Charles, author of The Hong Kong Filmography, 1977-1997 (2000) complimented the training and martial arts sequences, while saying that Executioners from Shaolin takes a large portion of its plot to focus on Hsu-guan and his family, and that this the attention to character is one of the film's best qualities. Donald Guarisco of AllMovie said the plot may be a bit haphazard with its radical tonal shifts for the average viewer, while saying "those who can overlook such eccentricities will be rewarded with a film that is full of surprises." Stephen Teo wrote in the book The Cinema of Hong Kong: History, Arts, Identity (2000) that by the mid-1970s, Lau Kar-leung showed how quickly kung fu films were evolving. Teo described Executioners of Shaolin as "a key work" that extended the genre beyond the cliches of master-disciple stories from the late 1960s into what he described as "greener fields of gender politics, father and son relationships and explorations of fight style allied with personality and sexuality."

== See also ==
- List of Hong Kong films of 1977
- List of Shaw Brothers films
