= Lee Hoi-sang =

Hong Kong actor (1941–2024)

- 李海生
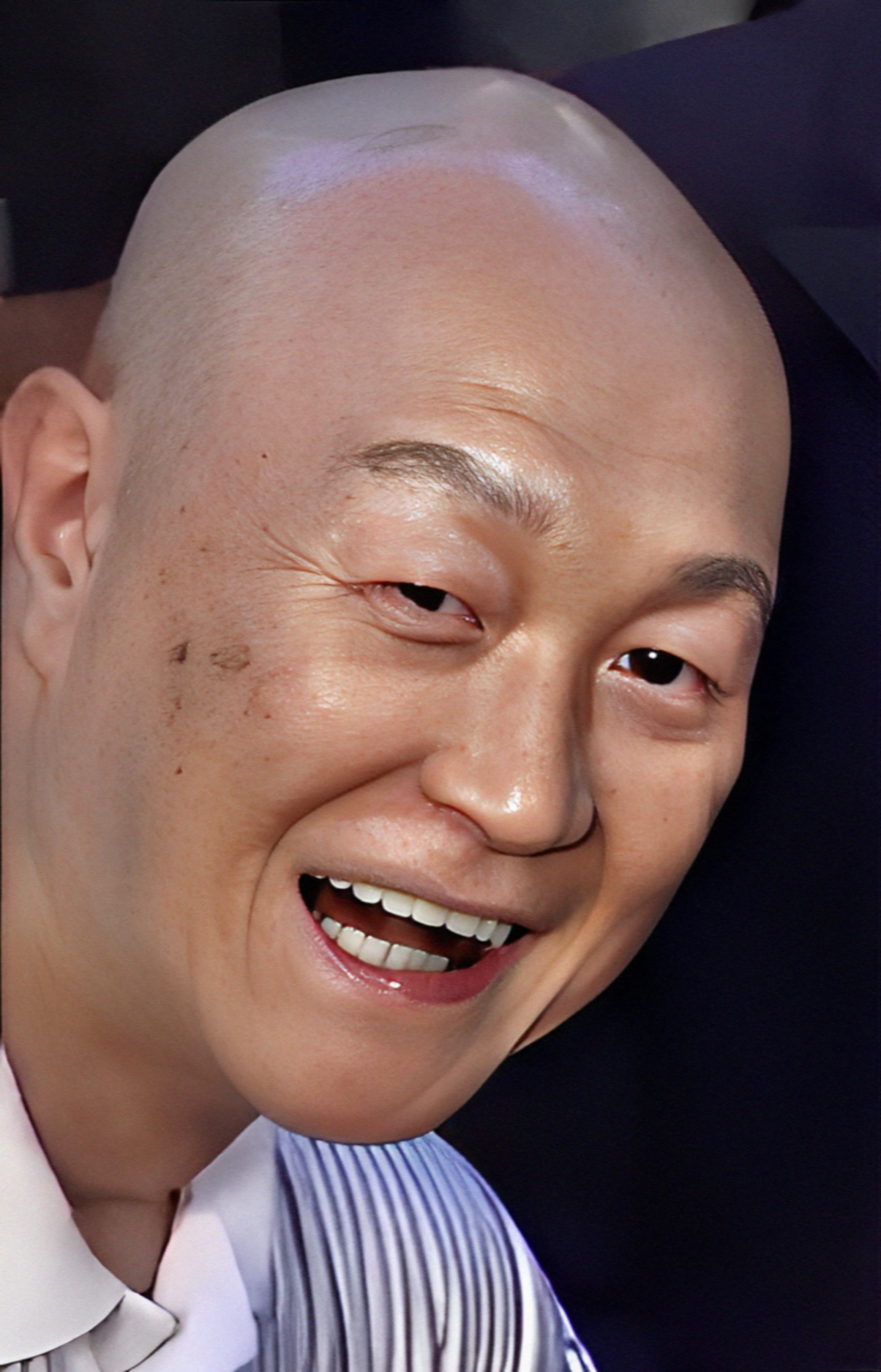
- Lee in 2018
- Born: April 15, 1941; British Hong Kong
- Died: September 9, 2024 (aged 83)
- Occupations: Martial arts film actor; martial artist
- Years active: Late 1960s–2024

Lee Hoi-sang (April 15, 1941 – September 9, 2024) was a Hong Kong martial arts film actor and martial artist, known for his roles in The 36th Chamber of Shaolin (as Abbot Li Hai Sheng) (1978), Shaolin Challenges Ninja (1978), The Incredible Kung Fu Master (1979), The Young Master (1980), The Prodigal Son (1981), Project A (1983), Shaolin and Wu Tang (1983) and Disciples of the 36th Chamber (1985), alongside actors such as Jackie Chan, Gordon Liu, Sammo Hung, Yuen Biao and Bolo Yeung.

== Life and career ==
Lee Hoi-sang was a master of Wing Chun boxing. He served as a martial arts instructor and an action movie actor (debuting in British Hong Kong) starting in his early years. During the 1970s and 1980s, he often utilised his kung fu expertise playing martial arts roles as well as other supporting roles on Asian TV dramas. To some of his audience he was known as "King of Fighters".

Lee was a disciple of Yip Man, learning Wing Chun from him and later teaching it.

Lee died on September 9, 2024, at the age of 83.

== Filmography ==
=== Film ===
| Year | Title | Role | Notes |
|---|---|---|---|
| 1974 | Shatter | Referee Hanson Lee | Uncredited |
| 1974 | Heroes Two | Tibetan Lama Fighter in Red | Kung Fu Invaders |
| 1974 | The Drug Addict | Boss Tseng (Lung Tai) | Xi Du Zhe |
| 1974 | Mad World of Fools | Brief Appearance | Guai Ren Guai Shi |
| 1974 | The Legend of the 7 Golden Vampires | | Uncredited |
| 1974 | Young Lovers on Flying Wheels | Xu Ci Hua | |
| 1974 | Paris Killers | Support Role | |
| 1975 | The Spiritual Boxer | Shum | |
| 1975 | The Young Rebel | Master Liu | |
| 1975 | Flatfoot in Hong Kong | Peking Opera Thug | Uncredited |
| 1975 | Big Brother Cheng | One of Prince Ji's Men | |
| 1976 | The Condemned | One of Sheng's Men | |
| 1976 | Million Dollars Snatch | Detective | |
| 1976 | Bruce Lee: The Man, the Myth | Challenger to Bruce Lee on the set of Enter the Dragon | Documentary |
| 1977 | Enter the Invincible Hero | Intro Fighter | Archive Footage |
| 1977 | Executioners from Shaolin | Monk Chi San | |
| 1977 | Deadly Angels | Chen Lai (Thug) | |
| 1977 | The Invincible Armour | Hu Lung | |
| 1977 | Money Crazy | Chan's Bodyguard | Fat Chin Hon |
| 1977 | Soul Brothers of Kung Fu | Master Hai Sheng Lee | Bei Po |
| 1977 | Winner Takes All | Support Role | |
| 1977 | He Has Nothing But Kung Fu | Wang's Top Fighter | |
| 1978 | Enter Three Dragons | Iron Head | Dragon on Fire |
| 1978 | The 36th Chamber of Shaolin | Abbot of Justice Office | |
| 1978 | Dynamo | Bald Training Partner | |
| 1978 | Soul of the Sword | Sire's Chief Pole Fighter | Sha Jue |
| 1978 | Shaolin Mantis | Mongol Fighter | |
| 1978 | Bruce Lee in New Guinea | Blue Cape Fighter | Big Boss in Borneo |
| 1978 | Enter the Fat Dragon | Professor Pai's Karate Thug | |
| 1978 | The Tattoo Connection | Eyepatch | Cameo |
| 1978 | Swordsman and Enchantress | One of 2 Zombies of the West | |
| 1978 | Hello, Late Homecomers | Support Role | |
| 1978 | The Extras | Tiger | |
| 1978 | Warriors Two | Ya Chao (Iron Fist) | |
| 1978 | Shaolin Challenges Ninja | Bald Pupil | |
| 1978 | Dirty Tiger, Crazy Frog | Crab Claw Master (White Brow Monk) | |
| 1978 | Descendant of Wing Chun | Ma Lung | |
| 1978 | Heroes of the East | Martial Art Student | |
| 1978 | Follow the Star | Kidnapper | |
| 1978 | Enter the Game of Death | First Boss | |
| 1979 | Kung Fu Genius | Li Hai Sheng | Tian Cai Gong Fu |
| 1979 | The Incredible Kung Fu Master | Yang Wei | |
| 1979 | The Best Hustler Wins | Teahouse Strongman | |
| 1979 | Bruce and the Iron Finger | Bald Killer | |
| 1979 | Three Avengers | Guo Lie | Enter Three Dragons |
| 1979 | The Reckless Cricket | Street Performer (Old Fellow) | |
| 1979 | Money Trip | | |
| 1979 | Green Hat Guy | | |
| 1979 | Knockabout | Painter Danno | |
| 1979 | Fists and Guts | Big Pang (Blacksmith) | |
| 1979 | Legend of Feng Hsui | | Bit Part |
| 1979 | Odd Couple | Bald Thug with Knives | |
| 1979 | Butcher Wing | Master Woo Ching Cheng | |
| 1979 | Last Hurrah for Chivalry | Pak Chung Tong | |
| 1979 | Goose Boxer | White-Crested Crane | |
| 1979 | Magnificent Butcher | Master Ko Ba Tin | |
| 1979 | My 12 Kung Fu Kicks | Kwai (Iron Skin Master) | |
| 1979 | The Shadow Boxing | Zhou Qian Tai | Spiritual Boxer 2 |
| 1979 | Ol' Dirty Kung Fu | Lung Yung Feng | Mad Mad Kung Fu |
| 1979 | Funny Children | | |
| 1980 | Bastard Kung Fu Master | Kung Fu Monk | Cameo |
| 1980 | The Kung Fu Warrior | Support Role | |
| 1980 | The Young Master | Kam's Second Bodyguard | |
| 1980 | An Old Kung Fu Master | | |
| 1980 | The Buddhist Fist | Mr. Chen | |
| 1980 | Young Outcasts | Hai-Sheng Li | |
| 1980 | The Sword | Chou Huan | |
| 1980 | Laughing Times | Ting's Bodyguard | |
| 1980 | Two Toothless Tigers | Support Role | |
| 1981 | Game of Death II | Bald Spade Fighter Monk | Assistant Stunt Coordinator |
| 1981 | Phantom Killer | Kam Tin Bar (Chin Tien Pa) | Pink Skull |
| 1981 | The Gold Hunters | Lee Shan | Rat Street |
| 1981 | Krazy Kops | | |
| 1981 | Security Unlimited | Robber with Pump-gun | |
| 1981 | The Prodigal Son | Chang's Kungfu Teacher | |
| 1982 | Shaolin Prince | Monk Dao Kong | Stunt Coordinator |
| 1982 | The Big Sting | Shark | |
| 1982 | Mercenaries from Hong Kong | He Ying's Bald Killer | |
| 1983 | Play Catch | Billion's Thug | Shao Ye Wei Wei |
| 1983 | Shaolin and Wu Tang | Brother Fa-Chi | |
| 1983 | Demon of the Lute | Chia-Sheng (Red-Haired Evil) | |
| 1983 | Shaolin Intruders | Abbot Kong Xing | Stunt Coordinator |
| 1983 | Men from the Gutter | Zeng Cai | |
| 1983 | Project A | Li Chou Kou | |
| 1984 | The Supreme Swordsman | Qing Qing's Grandfather | |
| 1984 | Crazy Kung Fu Master | Bald Gangster | |
| 1984 | The Company | Gangster | |
| 1984 | Wits of the Brats | 4 Eyes | |
| 1984 | The Lightning Fists of Shaolin | Instructor Zheng Hong | Stunt Coordinator |
| 1984 | Lust for Love of a Chinese Courtesan | Bald Swordsman (Ju San's Brother) | |
| 1984 | The Ghost Informer | Robber | |
| 1985 | Crazy Shaolin Disciples | Master Kua (Monk Guy Hong) | |
| 1985 | Disciples of the 36th Chamber | Tiger Lei | |
| 1985 | The Protector | Wing (Hong Kong Version) | Uncredited |
| 1985 | Crazy Romance | Prison Guard in Van | |
| 1985 | My Lucky Stars 2: Twinkle Twinkle Lucky Stars | Boss Lau's Driver | |
| 1985 | Heart of Dragon | Rascal at Restaurant | The First Mission |
| 1986 | Peking Opera Blues | Captain (Soldier with Moustache) | |
| 1986 | The Family Strikes Back | One of Kiu's Henchmen | |
| 1987 | Project A Part II | Choy | |
| 1988 | One Way Ticket to Bangkok | | |
| 1989 | Miracles | Sang (Thug) | |
| 1990 | Front Page | Dragon | |
| 1991 | Don't Fool Me | Big Mouth | |
| 1991 | Legend of the Dragon | Blind Temple Keeper | |
| 1991 | The Banquet | Man at Dinner | |
| 1993 | First Shot | Rice Shop Boss (Chiu's Man) | |
| 1993 | Bogus Cops | Triad in Bar | Zou Lao Wei Long |
| 1993 | The Kung Fu Scholar | Copper Head | |
| 1994 | The Wild Lovers | Prisoner | Chi Re Qing Yuan |
| 1995 | Kung Fu Cop | | |
| 2003 | Dragon Loaded | | |
| 2008 | The Luckiest Man | Fat's Buddy | |
| 2009 | Kung Fu Chefs | Great Grandfather | |
| 2011 | The Fortune Buddies | Kung Fu Expert | |
| 2012 | I Love Hong Kong 2012 | Kwok Ching's Colleague | |
| 2020 | Kung Fu Stuntmen | Self | Documentary |

=== Television ===
| Year | Title | Chinese Title | Role | Notes |
|---|---|---|---|---|
| 1985 | The Flying Fox of Snowy Mountain | 雪山飛狐 | Tong Pui | 40 Episodes |
| 1987 | Back to the Beyond | 陰陽界 | Uncredited | Tv Movie |
| 1989 | The Iron Butterfly | 特警 | Triad Boss | Tv Movie |
| 1991 | A New Life | 命運迷宮 | Heung Tung | |
| 1994 | Knot to Treasure | 婚姻物語 | | |
| 1994 | The Legend of the Condor Heroes | 射鵰英雄傳 | Pang Elder | |
| 1995 | Passions Across Two Lifetimes | 再世情未了 | | Tv Movie |
| 1995 | The Condor Heroes 95 | 神鵰俠侶 | Fu-muk | |
| 1996 | Journey to the West | 西遊記 | Zhang Guolao | |
| 1997 | Eightfold Path of the Heavenly Dragon | 天龍八部 | Monk Yuanton | 9 Episodes |
| 1999 | Justice Sung II | 狀王宋世傑 | Chan Leung | 32 Episodes |
| 2005 | Real Kung Fu | 佛山贊師父 | Leung Kai | |
| 2006 | The Dance of Passion | 火舞黃沙 | Elder in Clan Yim | Mini-Series |
| 2006 | Forensic Heroes | 法證先鋒 | Cheung Tai | 25 Episodes |
| 2007 | Best Bet | 迎妻接福 | Pawn Shop Worker | |
| 2007 | On the First Beat | 學警出更 | Landlord | |
| 2008 | D.I.E. | 古靈精探 | Ghostbuster | |
| 2008 | Love Exchange | 疑情別戀 | Dong's Friend | |
| 2009 | D.I.E. Again | 古靈精探 | Lau Dan | |
| 2010 | Can't Buy Me Love | 公主嫁到 | Abbot Mo-Can | 3 Episodes |
| 2011 | When Heaven Burns | 天與地 | Landlord | 2 Episodes |
| 2014 | Come On, Cousin | 老表，你好hea! | Sam Kau Gung | 12 Episodes |
| 2017 | The Exorcist's Meter | 降魔的 | Support Role | One Episode |
