= Dirty Ho =

1979 Hong Kong film by Lau Kar-leung

- Theatrical release poster
- Directed by: Lau Kar-leung
- Written by: Ni Kuang
- Produced by: Mona Fong; Run Run Shaw
- Starring: Gordon Liu; Wong Yue; Wang Lung Wei
- Cinematography: Arthur Wong; Ao Chih-chun
- Edited by: Chiang Hsing-lung; Li Yen-hai
- Music by: Eddie H. Wang Chi-Ren
- Distributed by: Shaw Brothers Studio
- Release date: 4 August 1979 (Hong Kong)
- Running time: 97 minutes
- Country: Hong Kong
- Languages: Mandarin; Cantonese

Dirty Ho (Chinese: 爛頭何; pinyin: Lan tou He) is a 1979 Hong Kong martial arts comedy film directed by Lau Kar-leung and starring Gordon Liu and Wong Yue. It was produced by the Shaw Brothers Studio.

== Plot ==
Master Wang is the 11th prince of Manchuria in disguise. Living as a sophisticated jewellery dealer and connoisseur of fine art and wine. Master Wang has no interest in being emperor and enjoys his rather peaceful lifestyle, yet he ends up trying to determine which of the other 14 heirs to the throne is trying to have him assassinated. Wang is a martial arts expert, but in order to conceal his identity, he systematically hides his skills, even if he needs to use them. An infamous jewel thief, Ho Ching, a.k.a. Dirty Ho, runs afoul of the prince, who eventually drafts Ho to help him flush out his enemies.

In the opening sequence of the film proper (after a title sequence which already features two highly abstract fight sequences by the principals) Wang encounters Ho Ching at a brothel. They come into conflict by vying with one another for the attentions of the courtesans, Wang using his legitimate jewellery, and Ho Ching using stolen jewellery. Ho Ching, who is not too bright, can't figure out why his efforts to fight with the seemingly cowardly, effete Wang inevitably result in clumsy disaster. It is Wang, of course, who skillfully deflects Ho into tripping over chairs and so forth. When the police come to arrest both men, Wang secretly displays his royal seal to the police captain, who tells his men to leave Wang alone. Wang orders the police captain to detain Ho Ching, but release him later. Ho Ching is arrested and taken to jail while Wang confiscates his stolen jewels and continues entertaining the courtesans.

Ho Ching is let go by the police and attempts to get "his" jewelry back from Wang, which again ends in clumsy disaster for him and eventually to a fight with some local thugs who are looking for him (who they claimed stole from them). After defeating them, Ho Ching is arrested a second time, and released again when Wang orders the police to let him go. In a final confrontation with Ho, Wang pretends that a female musician, Choi Hung (Kara Hui) is his "bodyguard", invisibly manipulating the bewildered woman's arms, legs and musical instrument in order to make her fight with Ho and eventually graze him in the forehead with a poisoned blade. It is, however, all part of Wang's scheme: he is secretly protecting the troublemaking, yet good-natured Ho from his greatest enemy (himself). Ho eventually seeks out Choi Hung for the antidote, but Wang tells her that she moved away to get married and left him the antidote, which Wang administers to Ho Ching in return for Ho Ching becoming his student.

Ho is initially puzzled at this since he has not detected any kung fu prowess in his master at all, yet goes along with it since Wang has the poison antidote, which must be administered in small doses over time. Initially, he remains a clueless bystander during two attempts on Wang's life: first, an attack at a wine-tasting, and then a visit to an antique-dealer's shop, both sponsored by General Liang at the orders of the 4th Prince (who wants his brother dead). Wang manages to defend himself admirably while maintaining the fiction that he is simply having a friendly aesthetic conversation with his opponents. Only at the end of the antique-shop attack does Ho figure out what's going on and intervene, but Wang receives a wound in the leg through a stratagem of the antiques dealer.

The master and his disciple sequester themselves in an abandoned residence – Wang for recovery, Ho Ching for some kung fu training. News spreads of a reward for an injured "fugitive" and a doctor discovers that Ho Ching is taking care of him. The doctor hires bounty hunters, whom he will split the reward with. When the bounty hunters come to confront Ho Ching and take Wang, Wang tells Ho Ching to pay them what the reward is so they can look the other way (while Ho incapacitates them in the process). But it is nearly time for the princes to assemble for the announcement of the heir to the throne, and so Wang and Ho undertake the dangerous journey to Peking with Wang in disguise, being pushed in a wheelchair by Ho.

Defeating an army of assassins in a ruined city, they manage to extract from the assassins' leader the identity of the Prince (Number Four) who is targeting Wang. The heroes then encounter their most formidable enemy, General Liang plus his captains, and a climactic fight sequence follows.

They manage to defeat their enemies just in time for the prince to enter the throne room in time for the Emperor's appearance. Ho Ching, outside the door, passes his master his necklace of beads on the pole they used during the fight; the Prince takes them and deftly uses the pole to send Ho flying outside the room. The film ends with a freeze-frame on Dirty Ho in mid-air.

== Cast ==
Cast adapted from the Shawscope Volume One home video release.

- Gordon Liu as Wang Tsun Hsin
- Wong Yue as Ho Jen
- Wang Lung Wei as Fan Tin-kong
- Lo Lieh as General Liang Jincheng
- Kara Hui as Crimson
- Hsiao Hou as Hsia Liu

== Production ==
In 1979, director Lau Kar-leung directed three comedy films, including Dirty Ho. Kara Hui was initially hired as an extra in the film, until the original actress set to play Crimson quit. Lau Kar-leung noted Hui's abilities in an audition tape for Chang Cheh's The Brave Archer and hired her to take over. Lau and Hui would work together in several films, such as My Young Auntie (1981).

== Release ==
Dirty Ho was released in Hong Kong on 4 August 1979. In December 2021, the film was released on Blu-ray as part of Arrow Video's Shawscope: Volume One box set, sharing a disc with Heroes of the East.

== See also ==
- List of Hong Kong films of 1979
