= Wong Yue =

Hong Kong actor

- 汪禹
- Born: Wong Chi-kuen (汪志權); October 26, 1955; British Hong Kong
- Died: May 15, 2008 (aged 52); Hong Kong
- Other names: Wong Yu; Wang Yu
- Occupation: Actor

Wong Yue (born Wong Chi-kuen; 26 October 1955 – 15 May 2008) was a Hong Kong martial arts film actor.

== Background ==
Born Wong Chi-kuen in Hong Kong on 26 October 1955. He starred in many Shaw Brothers Studio films and is known for his comic roles in films with Gordon Liu, such as Dirty Ho, Spiritual Boxer II, The 36th Chamber of Shaolin and Eight Diagram Pole Fighter.

He was sometimes credited as Wong Yu and as Wang Yu, but is a different person than the older Shaw Brothers star Jimmy Wang Yu. Producer Shaw gave him this name as an act of revenge against the original Wang Yu.

== Death ==
Wong Yue died in Hong Kong on May 16, 2008, from acute pneumonia.

== Filmography ==
- Guang gao nu lang (1958)
- The Bloody Fists (1972)
- Facets of Love (1973)
- White Butterfly Killer (1973)
- The Golden Lotus (1974) - Music Boy
- Thirteen (1974) - Hung Shen
- Hong Kong 73 (1974)
- Duo ju jie (1974)
- Young Passion (1974) - Hsu Wei-te
- The Tea House (1974) - 'Hak-zai' Mun
- The Two Faces of Love (1974)
- Flying Guillotine (1975) - Xie Tianfu
- It's All in the Family (1975) - Liang Hui
- Xi xiao nu ma (1975)
- Big Brother Cheng (1975) - 'Hak-zai' Mun
- That's Adultery! (1975) - (Part 4)
- Spiritual Boxer (1975) - Hsiao Chien
- Miao miao nu lang (1975) - Hsiao Chang
- The Criminals (1976) - Liu Ah-Tsai (Part 3)
- The Last Tempest (1976) - Chang Jin-hsi
- Suo ming (1976) - Chen Ling
- Challenge of the Masters (1976) - Master Lin Tu-chiang
- Emperor Chien Lung (1976) - Chou Tien-tsing
- The Snake Prince (1976) - Yellow Snake
- King Gambler (1976) - Prison officer
- Executioners from Shaolin (1977) - Hung Wen-Ting
- The Adventures of Emperor Chien Lung (1977)
- He Has Nothing But Kung Fu (1977) - Hsia Shan
- The Call Girls (1977) - Himself
- The 36th Chamber of Shaolin (1978) - Miller Six
- The Proud Youth (1978) - Nankung Sung
- Dirty Kung Fu (1978) - Gao Jai (Puppy)
- Spiritual Boxer II (1979) - Fan Chun Yuen
- The Kung Fu Instructor (1979) - Zhou Ping
- Dirty Ho (1979) - 'Dirty' Ho Jen
- The Kid With a Tattoo (1980) - Li Pao-tung
- Swift Sword (1980) - Hsia-Hou Hsiao-Tung
- Rendezvous With Death (1980) - Shin Suan ('Misery')
- The Young Avenger (1980) - Fu Yua
- Lion vs Lion (1981) - Ah Cun
- Challenge of the Gamesters (1981)
- Notorious Eight (1981)
- The Battle for the Republic of China (1981) - Yu Chi
- Winner Takes All (1982) - Kwan Yuan Cheung
- The Big Sting (1982)
- Kid from Kwangtung (1982)
- Mercenaries from Hong Kong (1982)
- Tales of a Eunuch (1983)
- Lady Is the Boss (1983)
- Take Care, Your Majesty (1983) - Emperor
- The Shy Boy (1983)
- Comedy (1984)
- Eight-Diagram Pole Fighter (1984) - Yang Yi-Lang - 1st Brother
- Wits of the Brats (1984) - Foo Sing
- Da xiao bu liang (1984)
- Dress Off for Life (1984)
- Crazy Shaolin Disciples (1985) - Fang Shih-Yu
- The Master Strikes Back (1985)
- The Flying Mr. B (1985)
- The Girl With the Diamond Slipper (1985) - Peter
- Why Me? (1985)
- Young Vagabond (1985)
- How to Choose a Royal Bride (1985) - Wei Xiao Bao
- Seventh Curse (1986)
- The Innocent Interloper (1986)
- Rouge (1987) - Ho Hsi
- Dragons Forever (1988)
- Wu long zei ti shen (1988)
- Blood Ritual (1989)
- The Rise and Fall of Qing Dynasty 2 (1988, TV Series)
- Framed (1989) - Ching
- The Godfather's Daughter Mafia Blues (1991) - Mr. Hsiong
- Spiritually a Cop (1991)
- Center Stage (1991)
- Handsome Siblings (1992)
- Power of Love (1993)
- Peach Sex Noxious Star (1993)
- Legend of the Liquid Sword (1993)
- Xian guang wei lai quan (1994)
- Once Upon a Time in China Series: The Final Victory (1996, TV Series) - So Yan Bing
- Dance of a Dream (2001)
