= Legendary Weapons of China =

1982 Hong Kong film by Liu Chia-liang

- The Hong Kong movie poster.

Chinese name
- Traditional Chinese: 十八般武藝
Transcriptions
Standard Mandarin
- Hanyu Pinyin: shí bā bān wǔ yì
Yue: Cantonese
- Jyutping: sap6 baat3 bun1 mou5 ngai6
- Directed by: Liu Chia-liang
- Written by: Liu Chia-liang; Li Tai-hang
- Produced by: Mona Fong
- Starring: Alexander Fu Sheng; Liu Chia-liang; Gordon Liu Chia-Hui; Liu Chia-yung; Hui Ying-hung
- Cinematography: Ao Chih-chun
- Edited by: Chiang Hsing-loong; Li Yen-hai
- Music by: So Chun-hou
- Production company: Shaw Brothers Studio
- Distributed by: World Wide Entertainment
- Release date: 21 January 1982 (Hong Kong)
- Running time: 105 minutes
- Country: Hong Kong
- Language: Cantonese

Legendary Weapons of China (Chinese: 十八般武藝; pinyin: shí bā bān wǔ yì; Jyutping: sap6 baat3 bun1 mou5 ngai6, lit. 'Eighteen Martial Ways'; a.k.a. Legendary Weapons of Kung Fu) is a 1982 martial arts wuxia film or wuxia pian directed by Liu Chia-liang. It takes place during the late Qing Dynasty when Empress Dowager Cixi dispatches her agents to various factions of the Boxer Rebellion in order to find supernatural martial artists that are invulnerable to western bullets. When one of the leaders of these groups disbands his forces, assassins from the remaining factions are sent out to kill him for his apparent treason. As the title of the film suggests, a great variety of fights take place involving the "legendary weapons."

Although Liu Chia-liang is known for showing "real Kung-Fu" in his films, he does take some artistic license by incorporating elements of Taoist Maoshan folk magic with hand-to-hand combat. This is similar to what he did in another of film of his, Heroes of the East (or Challenge of the Ninja).

== Plot ==
Ti Hau is a pupil of Master Ti, a high-ranking member of a boxer clan during the time of the Boxer Rebellion (1899 - 1901). Ti Tan, is a Member of a competing boxer clan who has successfully trained his students to resist penetration from swords (Golden Bell), but sacrifices them by experimenting with techniques to resist bullets. This appalls his niece, Fang Shao Ching. Lei Ying can control subjects with a voodoo doll and ventriloquism. The Yi Ho Society Chief, Li, explains that Lei Kung, an old pugilist master who left to form another branch in Yunan, has dissolved that branch and gone into hiding. Lei Kung no longer believes that their martial arts skills can defeat the modern weapons used by the western colonialists. Chief Yi proclaims Lei Kung a traitor to their movement. The chief orders his execution, and claims he can be identified because he enjoys showing off his kung-fu skills.

In Guangdong/Yunan, Ti Hau makes inquiries into the whereabouts of Lei Kung at a popular inn. Also searching is Fang Shao Ching, disguised as a man, and Lei Ying. They are unaware of each other's identities, but observe each other suspiciously. A flamboyant man also shows up and arouses suspicion. Ti Hau and Fang Shao Ching both suspect Lei Ying of being Lei Kung, and sneak into the attic above his room at the inn. They fight in the cramped space as Ti Tan walks into the room below, but he does not see them before they escape.

An old woodcutter, Yu, also arouses Ti Hau's suspicion because of his great strength. Fang Shao Ching distracts Ti Hau and lures him away, and they fight again but must stop to hide from Ti Tan. Fang explains to Ti Hau that her and Ti Tan are also Yi Ho members sent to kill Lei Kung, but she maintains her male disguise.

Under Fang's guidance, Lei Kung practices with his weapons. Ti Hau, who has been bedridden, sees him, but Lei Kung maintains his identity as the woodcutter Yu by saying that he only looks like Lei Kung, and must defend himself. They both discover that Fang is a woman. When Ti Hau regains his strength, he is grateful to Yu for taking care of him and is about to leave, but Ti Tan arrives. Fang and Ti Hau fight him before Yu, now at full power, engages him. He finally admits to everyone that he is Lei Kung, and declares that he has betrayed the Yi Ho society because he does not want to see all his young students die in a futile attempt to fight foreign modern guns and cannon. He disables Ti Tan, who admits defeat and leaves. Ti Hau feels betrayed and also leaves.

Soon after, a Magic Fighter turns up. Fang, believing it to be Ti Hau, berates him as he sits down and prepares, but is then shocked when it's revealed to be Master Tieh. Master Tieh being Ti Hau's sifu (master), and head of the Magic Clan. Master Tieh and Lei Kung engage in a duel, but Ti Hau arrives and interrupts. Master Tieh attempts to uses his mind control techniques on Ti Hau, in order to have him effectively commit suicide, announcing that both he and Lei Kung must die. However Lei Kung intervenes using a Snake Halberd against Master Tieh's 'Double Axe', saving Ti Hau and then disarming Master Tieh. Defeated, Master Tieh chooses to commit suicide using the same eye gouging technique on himself that he (using his mind control) tried to get Ti Hau to do. But, Ti Hai stops him, shaking his head, understanding that there's no point in such meaningless sacrifice. Master Tieh looks at Lei Kung, with a sadness in his eyes that convinces Lei Kung to lay down his weapon, the inference being that he sees how the deaths of so many innocent, young students to further a dead cause serves no real purpose. Ti Hau steps forward and is willing to follow his master, but Master Tieh suggests he remain with Lei Kung, so he can develop both his kung fu and his sense of self-awareness and understanding.

Lei Kung dresses in ceremonial garb and arrives at a temple with Ti Hau, Fang Shao Ching, and a full set of weapons. Lei Ying is waiting, and reveals his plan. He wanted Lei Kung to regain his expertise and kill the other assassins. Then Lei Ying could avoid fighting others and concentrate on Lei Kung, killing him and elevating his position in their clan and Yi Ho Society. After an 8-minute duel showcasing most of the 18 weapons and hand-to-hand combat, Lei Kung demonstrates that he could win if he wanted to. But instead, he leaves Lei Ying to his disgrace.

== The eighteen weapons ==
These weapons are revealed in a series of duels between key characters. When first used, the name of the weapon appears on the screen. Weapons 1 – 5 are used by Ti Hau's clan master, Ti Hau himself, and Lei Kung during a failed assassination attempt on the latter. Weapons 6 – 18 are used by Lei Kung and Lei Ying during their final battle. As combat progresses, the brothers constantly change weapons as each new choice seemingly defeats the techniques of that previously used. For example, 7 defeats 6, but 8 defeats 7.

1. Rope dart
2. Double tiger hook swords
3. Double hammers
4. Battle axe (Chinese: 鈇; pinyin: Fū)
5. Snake Halberd
6. Kwan Dao
7. Twin broadswords
8. Double-edged sword
9. Chinese Spear
10. Three-section chain whip
11. Double daggers (Chinese: 匕首; pinyin: Bǐ shǒu)
12. Double crutches
13. Monk's spade
14. Staff
15. Tiger fork (Chinese: 叉; pinyin: Chā)
16. Rattan shield (Chinese: 藤牌; pinyin: Téngpái)
17. Single butterfly sword
18. Three-section staff

== Cast ==
- Liu Chia-liang as Uncle Yu / Lei Kung
- Liu Chia-yung as Lei Ying
- Hsiao Ho as Ti Hau
- Hui Ying-hung as Fang Shao Ching
- Gordon Liu Chia-hui as Ti Tan
- Alexander Fu Sheng as Con Artist

== In other media ==
Wu-Tang Clan named their 2011 compilation, Legendary Weapons, in honour of the film. The film's English dub was heavily sampled throughout the album as well.

== See also ==
- List of Hong Kong films
- List of martial arts films
