= Lady Is the Boss =

1983 Hong Kong film by Lau Kar-leung

- Film poster
- Directed by: Lau Kar-leung
- Written by: Lau Kar-keung; Li Tai Heng; Huang Pa Ching
- Produced by: Mona Fong Yat Wah
- Starring: Lau Kar-leung; Kara Hui; Gordon Liu; Hsiao Ho; Robert Mak Tak-Law; David Cheung Chin-pang; Wong Yue; Johnny Wang Lung Wei
- Cinematography: Cho On-Sun
- Edited by: Chiang Hsing-Lung; Lee Yim-Hoi
- Music by: Stephen Shing; So Jan-Hau
- Distributed by: Shaw Brothers Studio
- Release date: 31 March 1983 (Hong Kong)
- Running time: 93 minutes
- Country: Hong Kong
- Language: Cantonese

Lady Is the Boss is a 1983 Shaw Brothers kung fu-comedy film directed by Lau Kar-leung and starring Kara Hui.

== Plot ==
Wang Hsieh Yun (Lau Kar Leung) is the current teacher of a kung fu school in Hong Kong. However it is the 80's and people are not interested in "old school" kung fu anymore. He receives a letter telling him to pick up the schools boss from the airport which much to his surprise is Chan Mei Ling (Kara Hui). Mei Ling is the daughter of the schools' master, thus making her the "de facto" boss. She is very much Americanized and begins making changes at the school and taking in her father's students–Li Hon Man (Gordon Liu), Cheuk Jin Shing (Hsiao Ho), Wong Yuen Shuei (Robert Mak Tak Law), Ng Ming Fat (David Cheung Chin-pang) and Ah Wing (Wong Yue)–off the street, discos, and bars, which angers the traditionalist Wang. Eventually Mei Ling gets in trouble with a local gang headed up by Big Boss (Johnny Wang Lung Wei), and after provoking a fight at bar owned by Big Boss, Wang is forced to rescue her and teach Big Boss and his thugs a slight lesson. This forces Big Boss to retaliate until a fight breaks out in a local gym in which Big boss is defeated and Mei Ling eventually returns to the U.S. after realizing Wang should be in charge of the school.

== Cast ==
- Lau Kar Leung as Wang Hsieh Yun
- Kara Hui as Mei Ling
- Gordon Liu as Lee Hon Man
- Hsiao Ho as Cheuk Jin Shing
- Robert Mak Tak-Law as Wong Yuen Shuei
- David Cheung Chin-pang as Ng Ming Fat
- Wong Yue as Ah Wing
- Johnny Wang Lung Wei as Big boss

== Reception ==
LoveHKFilm gave the film a mildly positive review: "An interesting premise is basically squandered due to slapdash plotting, but some likeable performances and solid action choreography, particularly in the finale, sweeten the experience considerably."
