= My Young Auntie =

1981 Hong Kong film by Lau Kar-leung

- Film poster
- Traditional Chinese: 長輩
- Simplified Chinese: 长辈
- Directed by: Lau Kar-leung
- Written by: Lau Kar-leung
- Produced by: Mona Fong
- Starring: Lau Kar-leung; Kara Hui; Gordon Liu
- Cinematography: Ao Chih-Chun
- Edited by: Ching Hsing-lung; Li Yen-Hai
- Music by: Eddie W. Wang
- Production company: Shaw Brothers Studio
- Release date: 1981 (Hong Kong)
- Running time: 119 minutes
- Country: Hong Kong
- Languages: Cantonese; English

My Young Auntie aka Fangs of The Tigress is a 1981 comedy-themed Hong Kong action film from the Shaw Brothers studio. The film is directed by Lau Kar Leung and stars Kara Hui, Hsiao Ho, Wang Lung Wei, and Gordon Liu. In a change from Lau Kar Leung's more serious martial arts films, My Young Auntie is a generally lighthearted kung-fu comedy. Lau Kar Leung again cast Kara Hui in the later Lady Is the Boss, which revisited similar themes. Kara Hui won Best Actress at the first Hong Kong Film Awards for her performance in this film.

== Plot ==
A young female martial-arts champion, Cheng Tai-nun (Kara Hui) marries an elderly landowner so the old man can keep his estate from falling into the greedy and unscrupulous hands of his brother Yu Yung-Sheng (Wang Lung Wei). Tai-nun inherits his estate when he dies, and is soon in Canton, staying with her older nephew by marriage, Yu Cheng-chuan (Lau Kar Leung), and his son Yu Tao (Hsiao Ho). When the traditional and conservative Tai-nun, a woman from the provinces, runs into the modern and Westernized Yu Tao for the first time, the sparks fly and a clash of egos begins.

Their conflict eventually leads to Yu Tao inviting Tai-nun to a costume party in hopes of embarrassing her in public. When the two get into trouble and Cheng-chuan needs to bail them out, the evil brother takes this opportunity to steal the deed to the dead husband's estate. Tai-nun and Yu Tao reach out to their extended family and ask for their help to retrieve the deed back. Although the family members agree, it becomes apparent that Yu Cheng-chuan and his brothers may be too old to help.

Tai-nun and Yu Tao decide to go get the deed back themselves and work together to infiltrate the evil brother's estate. Although they fight bravely, they are eventually outnumbered. Tai-nun is held hostage while Yu Tao is able to escape. With the help of his father and uncles, Yu Tao is able to help Tai-nun and the deed is given back to its rightful owner.

== Cast ==
- Lau Kar Leung
- Kara Hui
- Wang Lung Wei
- Hsiao Ho
- Gordon Liu

== Awards ==
1st Hong Kong Film Awards

- Best Actress (Kara Hui)
