= Martial Club =

1981 Hong Kong film by Lau Kar-leung

- Theatrical release poster

Chinese name
- Traditional Chinese: 武館
Transcriptions
Standard Mandarin
- Hanyu Pinyin: Wu guan
- Directed by: Lau Kar-leung
- Written by: Ni Kuang
- Produced by: Mona Fong
- Starring: Kara Hui; Hsiao Ho; Wang Lung-wei; Gordon Liu; Ku Feng
- Cinematography: Peter Ngor
- Edited by: Chiang Hsing-Lung; Lee Yim-Hoi
- Music by: Eddie H. Wang Chi-Ren
- Distributed by: Shaw Brothers Studio
- Release date: 20 August 1981 (Hong Kong)
- Running time: 110 minutes
- Country: Hong Kong
- Language: Cantonese

Martial Club (Chinese: 武館; pinyin: Wu guan) (a.k.a. Instructors of Death) is a 1981 Shaw Brothers film directed by Lau Kar-leung. It is another of his lighthearted kung fu films starring Kara Hui, Hsiao Ho, Gordon Liu and Wang Lung Wei in a rare hero role.

== Plot ==
After a series of lion dances in the opening minutes, Wong Fei Hung and his once-rival, now friend, find themselves and their martial arts schools pitted against a rival school which uses a kung fu expert Master Shan from the north to do their dirty work, although the expert doesn't realize he is being evil (they lie to him). After his friend Chu-Ying's brother is beat up in a brothel, Fei Hung goes to the rival school to confront them and Master Shan. There is also a mass kung fu "war" in a local theater which is the second highlight of the film, the first being an excellent fight in an alley between Fei Hung and Master Shan. This may be the only role in which Wang Lung Wei as the hero from the north isn't a villain. He fights Wong Fei Hung but once he discovers that he has been tricked by the bad school, he refuses to help them anymore.

== Cast ==
- Kara Hui – Chu-Ying
- Hsiao Ho – Mai Chen-Huo
- Wang Lung-wei – Master Shan
- Gordon Liu – Wong Fei-hung
- Ku Feng – Wong Chi-Ying
