= Cat Vs. Rat =

1982 Hong Kong film by Lau Kar-leung

- Film poster

Chinese name
- Traditional Chinese: 御貓三戲錦毛鼠
- Simplified Chinese: 御猫三戏锦毛鼠
Transcriptions
Standard Mandarin
- Hanyu Pinyin: Yù Māo Sān Xì Jĭn Máo Shŭ
Yue: Cantonese
- Jyutping: Jyu^{6} Maau^{1} Saam^{1} Hei^{3} Gam^{2} Mou^{4} Syu^{2}
- Directed by: Lau Kar-leung
- Written by: Ni Kuang
- Produced by: Mona Fong
- Starring: Alexander Fu Sheng; Adam Cheng; Kara Hui; Hsiao Ho; Gordon Liu; Lydia Shum; Lau Kar-wing
- Cinematography: Cho On-Sun; Cho Wai-Kei
- Edited by: Chiang Hsing-Lung; Lee Yim-Hoi
- Music by: Stephen Shing Gam-Wing; So Jan-Hau
- Production company: Shaw Brothers Studio
- Release date: 30 September 1982 (Hong Kong)
- Running time: 92 minutes
- Country: Hong Kong
- Language: Cantonese

Cat Vs. Rat is a 1982 Shaw Brothers martial arts-comedy film directed by Lau Kar Leung, starring Alexander Fu, Adam Cheng, Kara Hui, and Hsiao Ho. The plot is loosely based on the 19th century wuxia classic novel The Seven Heroes and Five Gallants.

== Plot ==
Baak Juktong and Zin Ciu were martial arts students of the same sifu, Si Daatfu. They quarreled and fought incessantly over who had the most powerful kungfu. Baak saved the emperor, traveling in the region in plain clothes, but did not believe his identity when the emperor offered him officialdom. Later, Zin also saved the emperor, who appointed him imperial sword-bearing guard with the title "Royal Cat". Jealous and infuriated, especially because his nickname was "Brocade-Coated Rat" (rats were known as cat food), Baak and his four sworn brothers — Zoeng Ping the "River-Overturning Rat", Ceoi Hing the "Mountain-Boring Rat", Hon Zoeng the "Earth-Piercing Rat" and Lou Fong the "Sky-Penetrating Rat" — plotted to steal the imperial jade seal from the emperor to embarrass Zin.

== Cast ==
Note: The characters' names are in Cantonese (Jyutping) romanisation. Mandarin (Pinyin) romanisation is included in parentheses when helpful.

- Kara Hui as Zin Juklaan
- Hsiao Ho as Zoeng Ping (Jiang Ping)
- Alexander Fu Sheng as Baak Juktong (Bai Yutang)
- Adam Cheng as Zin Ciu (Zhan Zhao)
- Lau Kar-wing as Si Daatfu
- Lydia Shum as Baak's mother
- Gordon Liu as the emperor
- Lam Fai-wong as Can Gim
- Johnny Wang Lung-wei as Ceoi Hing (Xu Qing)
- Ching Chu as Hon Zoeng (Han Zhang)
- David Cheung Chin-pang as Lou Fong (Lu Fang)
