= Hsiao Ho =

Hsiao Ho may refer to:

- Xiao He (died 193 BC), Liu Bang's advisor during the Chu-Han Contention and chancellor of the Han dynasty, name also romanized as Hsiao Ho
- Hsiao Ho (actor) (born 1958), Hong Kong–based Chinese actor
