= Shaolin Warrior =

1980 Hong Kong film by Lau Kar-wing

- Film poster

Chinese name
- Traditional Chinese: 破戒大師
Transcriptions
Standard Mandarin
- Hanyu Pinyin: Pòjiè dàshīī
- Directed by: Lau Kar-wing
- Written by: Fung Hak-on; Peter Chan-lung
- Produced by: Gordon Liu; Lau Kar-leung; Lau Kar-wing
- Starring: Lau Kar-wing; Chia Hui Liu
- Cinematography: Arthur Wong
- Edited by: Tony Chow
- Music by: Frankie Chan
- Production companies: Lau Brothers Film Company; Golden Princess Film Production
- Release date: 3 July 1980 (Hong Kong)
- Running time: 89 minutes
- Country: Hong Kong
- Language: Cantonese

Shaolin Warrior (Chinese: 破戒大師; pinyin: Pòjiè dàshīī), also known as Warrior from Shaolin, Carry on Wise Guy and The Monk, is a 1980 kung fu film directed by and starring Lau Kar-wing and Gordon Liu, under his birth name Chia Hui Liu. It is originally a Cantonese-language film.
