= Tiger on the Beat =

1988 Hong Kong film by Lau Kar-leung

- Film poster
- Traditional Chinese: 老虎出更
- Simplified Chinese: 老虎出更
- Hanyu Pinyin: Lǎo Hǔ Chū Gèng
- Jyutping: Lou5 Fu2 Ceot1 Gaang1
- Directed by: Lau Kar-leung
- Written by: Tsang Kwok-chi
- Produced by: Tsang Kwok-chi
- Starring: Chow Yun-fat; Nina Li Chi; Conan Lee
- Cinematography: Chan Kwong-hung
- Edited by: Wong Ming-lam
- Music by: Teddy Robin
- Distributed by: Cinema City & Films Co.
- Release date: 19 March 1988 (Hong Kong)
- Running time: 93 minutes
- Country: Hong Kong
- Language: Cantonese
- Box office: HK$27,865,158

Tiger on the Beat (Chinese: 老虎出更; lit. 'Tiger on Beat') is a 1988 Hong Kong action comedy film directed by Lau Kar-leung. It was written and produced by Tsang Kwok-chi. The film stars Chow Yun-fat and Conan Lee as a buddy cop team who originally hate each other, but learn to overcome their differences in solving a case.

On its release in 1988, it was described as a "surprise hit" at the Hong Kong box office. At the 8th Hong Kong Film Awards, the Liu Brothers were nominated for their work on Tiger on the Beat for Best Action choreography. A sequel which also featured Lee, Tiger on the Beat 2, was released in 1990.

== Synopsis ==
Lazy police veteran Francis Li and his eager rookie partner Michael Tso are assigned to investigate the murder of a heroin trafficker "Poison Snake" Ping who was known to be associated with crime boss Johnny Law.

The duo interrogate bar girl Marydonna who is the sister of "Poison Snake" Ping, one of Law's associates. Marydonna eventually caves to the intense pressure and fingers Law. Though the criminal soon winds up in jail and Li gets his long overdue promotion, Law is all out for revenge.

== Cast ==
- Chow Yun-fat as Francis Li
- Nina Li Chi as Marydonna (credited as Li Chi)
- Conan Lee as Michael Tso
- Gordon Liu as Fai, the Hitman
- Philip Ko as Heroin dealer (credited as Ko Fai)
- Shing Fui-On as Dummy (credited as Shing Fui Ann)
- Ti Lung as Loong
- David Chiang as Police Superintendent (credited as John Keung)
- James Wong as Police Inspector Jim Pak
- Lydia Shum as department store staff (credited as Sun Tin Ha)
- Lau Kar-wing as Sour Puss
- Shirley Ng as Mimi, Francis' sister
- Norman Chui as Mr. Law (credited as Tsui Shui Keung)
- Chan Chi-shing as Shing
- Joe Bryan Baker as Boss

== Production ==
The filmmakers originally wanted Brigitte Lin to play the role of Marydonna in the Tiger on the Beat, but Michael Mak and Shi Tian, the owners of Cinema City Enterprises, thought that Lin's HK$600,000 salary was too expensive. They offered half of the salary and cast Nina Li Chi.

== Release and sequel ==
Tiger on the Beat was released in Hong Kong on March 19, 1988. It grossed a total of HK$27,865,158. Bey Logan in his book Hong Kong Action Cinema (1995) described it as a surprise hit in Hong Kong. The film was released in the United States as Tiger on the Beat.

Tiger on the Beat 2 was the films sequel which does not follow the narrative or characters established in the original film. Returning cast included Conan Lee while Chow-Yun fat passed on appearing in the film. Bey Logan described it as an "outright flop." in the Hong Kong box office.

== Reception ==
At the 8th Hong Kong Film Awards in 1989, The Liu Clan were nominated for their work on Tiger on the Beat for Best Action choreography. The award was given to The Jackie Chan Stunt Team for Police Story 2 (1988).

In his book The Hong Kong Filmography, John Charles described the film as having "wild action and low humor", concluding that it was an "entertaining knock off of Lethal Weapon. While Charles said Chow Yun-fat for giving "one of his most animated performances" in the film, a review in Sight & Sound wrote that Chow Yun-fat's screen persona would mature in other later films such as The Killer (1989) and Hard Boiled (1992).
