= Tiger on the Beat 2 =

1990 Hong Kong film by Lau Kar-leung

- Theatrical release poster
- Traditional Chinese: 老虎出更2
- Hanyu Pinyin: Lǎo Hǔ Chū Gèng 2
- Jyutping: Lou5 Fu2 Ceot1 Gaang1 2
- Directed by: Lau Kar-leung
- Written by: Cheung Lai-Ling; Ho Yi
- Produced by: Karl Maka
- Starring: Danny Lee; Conan Lee
- Cinematography: Paul Chan; Fan Chuen-Lam
- Edited by: Chan Ki-Hop
- Music by: Richard Lo
- Production companies: Cinema City Film Productions; Golden Princess Film Production Limited
- Distributed by: Cinema City & Films Co.
- Release date: 10 February 1990
- Running time: 94 minutes
- Country: Hong Kong
- Language: Cantonese
- Box office: HK$8,682,242

Tiger on the Beat 2 (Chinese: 老虎出差2), also known as Tiger on Beat 2, is a 1990 Hong Kong action comedy film directed by Lau Kar-leung. It is the sequel to the 1988 film Tiger on the Beat.

== Plot ==
Hong Kong Police Captain Lam Yick-lin's sister's son Buffalo travels from Los Angeles to Hong Kong and Lam is tasked by his sister with finding her American-born Chinese son a suitable Chinese wife. Lam and Buffalo respond to Sweet Dream's report of a murder on a boat owned by the cocaine dealer Fai, but cannot find any body, which has been thrown into the sea. Sweet Dream, now in possession of the dead man's valuable ring used as identification in drug deals, seeks protection from Buffalo by inviting him to stay in her apartment with her and her roommate Meng. A killer enters the apartment and tries to kill Sweet Dream but, after a struggle, he falls from a balcony and dies. Meng asks for help from two men outside, but they are Fai's men so they kill her. Buffalo did not see any of this occur, so he does not believe Sweet Dream's story and takes her to stay with his uncle Captain Lam. Fai's men attempt to kill her again, but Lam and Buffalo see this and help her. Sweet Dream eventually swallows the ring, so Fai's men are forced to bring her along to a warehouse for their planned cocaine deal, but Buffalo and Lam fight off her attackers and hold them for arrest by the arriving police. Lam is suddenly shot by one of the dealers, but survives thanks to a bulletproof vest given to him by Buffalo.

== Cast ==
- Danny Lee as Captain Lam Yick-lin
- Conan Lee as Buffalo
- Ellen Chan as Sweet Dream
- Roy Cheung as Fai's Man
- John Cheung
- Chim Bing Hei
- Norman Chu as Chui
- Maria Cordero as Maria
- Mark Houghton as Mark
- Phillip Ko as Hood
- Lam Yin-Ming as Helen
- Liu Chia-Hui as Fai
- Mai Te-Lo as Snakeboy Ming
- James Wong as Wong
- Xiong Xin Xin

== Production ==
The film was shot in Hong Kong.

Multiple reviewers and writers have commented on Conan Lee "nearly killing himself in an insane stunt in Tiger on the Beat II." When asked in an interview for easternfilmfans.com whether that was the craziest thing he'd ever done, Conan Lee responded,

"Not the craziest, but I wanted to adjust the stunt in mid air and the post was very slippery. The stunt was too easy just jumping 22 ft. like a long jump and land on the post and slide down like a fireman or Batman…And for the industry; I wanted to use this stunt as a trademark for Conan Lee’s Bravery. I wanted to be The Real Deal Conan lee and make use of my skills, so I decided to try to make 3 stunts into one take. I wanted to jump and land on the arm of the lamppost, then slide down 1/3 of the way and push off leaping onto an on traffic car in the farthest lane. It wasn’t a stunt gone wrong or any miscalculating. If I didn’t reach the post then we can say it went wrong or miscalculated. It was too slippery and I hit the post too hard and the momentum gave me a little trouble. But I was in the state of mind to not lose that shot and we used it on screen and the results were just as awesome. Every stuntmen and people from the industry all came to witness this stunt being performed by me. ALL 100% of the industry people said, they would never think of doing such a stunt and all the stuntmen said, NO ONE WOULD EVEN REACH THE POST! That will be the most dangerous stunt in the history of HK action film making. No one will ever attempt a stunt knowing it would cripple you or even get killed. CONAN LEE IS THE BRAVEST ACTION STAR IN HK HISTORY."

The injury postponed production and limited Conan Lee's ability to participate in other action scenes of the film.

== Release ==
The film had a theatrical run in Hong Kong from 10 to 21 February 1990, earning HK$8,682,242.

The film was released under the title Born Hero 3 in some regions.

In Chinese, the film is sometimes also known as 老虎出差2 猛虎發威.

== Reception ==
A review on the website chrichtonsworld.com reads, "I had zero expectations for this sequel but perhaps that is why it managed to surprise me. It's my guess that director Lau Kar-leung was more hands on in this one than he was in the original." The review concludes, "Believe it or not Tiger on the Beat is well worth your time. Although you do have to keep your expectations in check."

Reviewer Andrew Saroch of fareastfilms.com gave the film a rating of 2 out of 5 stars, calling it a "vastly inferior sequel to the smash hit Chow Yun Fat vehicle". The review concludes, "Conan Lee is sadly prevented from engaging in any of the fast-paced action of the original as he was injured in a stunt during filming (which is seen in the course of the film) and therefore as a result was extensively doubled. There are odd glimpses of entertainment in 'Tiger On The Beat 2', but not enough to make this a recommended film to even hardcore action fans."

A review by Sean Gilman for The Chinese Cinema reads, "Bears no actual relation to the first Tiger on the Beat, which found Lau Kar-leung diving head-first into the world of contemporary cop actioners. Same genre here, along with one of the same stars, the pumped up, slightly dim-witted Conan Lee. He's paired with Danny Lee this time (a sure sign that this is a step down in prestige from the first film, where Conan was paired with Chow Yun-fat). [...] It never reaches the glorious heights of the chainsaw sequence in the first film, though there is an amazing stunt early on. Conan jumps off an overpass, maybe 40 feet in the air, to a light pole, in an attempt to slide down it to the ground. But he misses the pole and lands flat on the asphalt."

The review of the film on sogoodreviews.com reads, "Teaming up Conan Lee with Danny Lee this time necessarily isn't a bad choice but director Lau Kar Leung can't really inject the same comedic interplay that he could when Chow Yun-Fat was on board. The fact that Conan also was seriously hurt during a stunt (very much visible in the movie) postponed production and limited his participation in terms of action."
