= Lau Kar-leung =

Hong Kong martial artist, filmmaker and actor (1934-2013)

- 劉家良
- Born: 28 July 1934; Guangzhou, Guangdong, Republic of China
- Died: 25 June 2013 (aged 78); Tai Wai, Hong Kong
- Other names: Lau Kar-lung; Liu Chia-liang; Liu Chia-liung; Liu Ka-liang; Kung Fu Leung
- Occupations: Director; action choreographer; actor
- Years active: 1953–2013
- Spouses: Ho Sau-ha (divorced) Mary Jean Reimer (m. 1984–2013)
- Children: 7
- Father: Lau Cham
- Relatives: Lau Kar-wing (brother)
- Martial arts career
- Style: Hung Ga; Nanquan
- Teacher: Lau Cham

Chinese name
- Traditional Chinese: 劉家良
- Simplified Chinese: 刘家良
Transcriptions
Standard Mandarin
- Hanyu Pinyin: Liú Jiāliáng
Yue: Cantonese
- Jyutping: Lau4 Gaa1-loeng4

Lau Kar-leung (traditional Chinese: 劉家良; simplified Chinese: 刘家良; Jyutping: Lau^{4} gaa^{1}-loeng^{4}; pinyin: Liú Jiāliáng; 28 July 1934 – 25 June 2013) was a Hong Kong martial artist, filmmaker, fight choreographer and actor. He is best known for the films he made in the 1970s and 1980s for the Shaw Brothers Studio, notably those starring Gordon Liu. He is considered one of the most influential figures in the history of martial arts cinema.

In many of his best-known films, Lau was credited as Liu Chia-liang, the Wade–Giles spelling of his Mandarin name. He was part of a lineage of Hung Ga practitioners originating from Wong Fei-hung.

== Early life ==
Lau was born in Guangzhou, Guangdong Province in 1934. He had a younger brother, Kar-wing, also a prominent martial arts actor and filmmaker.

Lau began learning kung fu when he was nine years old, under strict tutelage from his father, Lau Cham. The elder Lau was a well-known practitioner of the Wong Fei-hung lineage of Hung Ga, as a disciple of Wong's pupil Lam Sai-wing. He was the headmaster of the Hua Chiang Martial Arts Society in Guangzhou, where he lived with his family until 1948, when they moved to British Hong Kong. Lau became adept in various styles of Southern Chinese martial arts, training rigorously with his father until the age of 28.

== Film career ==
=== Director and choreographer ===
Before becoming famous, Lau worked as an extra and choreographer on black and white Wong Fei-hung movies. He teamed up with fellow Wong Fei-hung choreographer Tong Gaai on the 1963 Hu Peng-directed wuxia film South Dragon, North Phoenix. Their collaboration would continue on until the mid-1970s. His first appearance in a film was in Brave Lad of Guangong (1950).

In the 1960s he became one of Shaw Brothers' main choreographers and had a strong working relationship with director Chang Cheh, working on many of Chang's films as a choreographer (often alongside Tong Gaai) including The One-Armed Swordsman, as well as other Shaw Brothers wuxia films, such as The Jade Bow. After a split with Chang on the set of Marco Polo, Lau evolved into a director during the sudden boom of martial arts films in the early 1970s. He occasionally did choreography work for non-Shaw films as well, such as Master of the Flying Guillotine.

After Shaw Brothers stopped producing movies in 1986, Lau continued directing and choreographing films independently, despite numerous obstacles, among them the fact that Shaw Brothers considered his contract with them still valid despite the fact that they were no longer making movies. This led to a rumored four-film deal with Jackie Chan being canceled when Shaw approached Chan and warned him that Lau was still under contract to them. Additionally, because his last film for Shaw Brothers, Martial Arts of Shaolin (1986), had been filmed in Mainland China, Lau was not allowed to work in Taiwan and no Taiwanese distributors would handle his films. Lau approached Cinema City who agreed to settle his issues with Taiwan if he directed three films for them, Tiger on the Beat (1988), Aces Go Places 5: The Terracotta Hit (1989), and Tiger on the Beat 2 (1990). The box office successes of these three films reinvigorated his career.

In March 1993, Lau began directing Jackie Chan in Drunken Master II, however, the film's star Jackie Chan and director Lau clashed over the style of fighting, resulting in Lau leaving the set before the shooting of the final fight scene, which was then taken over by Chan. Lau subsequently directed Drunken Master III and Drunken Monkey without Chan.

His final credit was when he performed acting and choreography work for Tsui Hark's 2005 film Seven Swords.

=== Screenplays ===
Throughout his career, Lau only wrote four screenplays, but they were all for films that he himself directed. Those screenplays/films are My Young Auntie (1981), Legendary Weapons of China (1982), Lady Is the Boss (1983) and Eight-Diagram Pole Fighter (1983). All of the films also starred or featured Gordon Liu in some role or capacity.

=== Collaborations with Gordon Liu ===
Lau's most frequent collaborator is likely his "god brother" Gordon Liu Chia Hui, and he worked with Liu on a number of films, directing him as a star in the now classic The 36th Chamber of Shaolin (1978), as well as directing Liu as either a star or cast member in Dirty Ho (1979), Eight-Diagram Pole Fighter (1983), Executioners from Shaolin (1977), Return to the 36th Chamber (1980), Heroes of the East (1978), Legendary Weapons of China (1982), Disciples of the 36th Chamber (1985), Tiger on Beat (1988), Tiger on the Beat 2 (1990), Shaolin Warrior (1980), The Spiritual Boxer Part II (1979), Cat vs Rat (1982), Lady Is the Boss (1983), My Young Auntie (1981), Challenge of the Masters (1976), Shaolin Mantis (1978), Martial Club (1981), and Drunken Monkey (2003). They also appeared together as themselves in the Italian documentary "Dragonland" (2009, directed by Lorenzo De Luca).

== Style and techniques ==
Regarding his style of fight choreography, Lau was generally considered a purist, who sought to portray the various martial arts as authentically as possible. He was also notable for emphasizing both unarmed and armed arts. He avoided overt stylization in his on-screen combat, minimizing the use of wirework and trampolines that would prove the staple of other choreographers like Yuen Woo-ping. "My only aim in making a film is to exalt the martial arts," he said in a South China Morning Post interview. In the same interview, he stated

"There are four kinds of kung fu. The first one is the one you use to fight, free fighting, kicking the sandbags, running, not much to learn. The second is for strengthening your body – tai chi, which strengthens your chi. The third kind is for exhibition – showing off, so even people sitting far away can see it. The fourth kind is my kind – I learned it to fight in movies!"

To that end, he infrequently used low kicks, common in real unarmed combat, for more visible and spectacular high kicks.

== Teaching ==
Lau began training students Hung Gar before the age of 5 and was already quite proficient in the style. Bruce Lee treated Lau as an elder uncle and asked him for advice in regard to his film career.

He also founded the Liu Clan (Chinese: 劉家班), a stunt team, which received two nominations for Best Action Choreography in the 6th and 8th Hong Kong Film Awards with Martial Arts of Shaolin (1986) and Tiger on the Beat (1988).

Lau opened the Lau Family Hung Gar academy in Fanling, led by his pupil Mark Houghton. He gave his disciple the permission to spread the art of Lau Family Hung Gar to chosen students. There are already branches in England, Philippines, and Mainland China.

== Personal life ==
Lau's nephew Lau Kar-yung (son of his older sister) is also an actor, choreographer and director. Another nephew, Lau Wing-kin (Lau Kar-wing's son) is also an actor, and assisted Lau Kar-leung with action directing on Seven Swords.

As his acting career went smoothly, his family began to worry about his marriage. On seeing that Liu had reached the marriageable age and there was no suitable woman around him, they introduced him to a woman named Ho Sau-ha (何秀霞). Though Lau only had interest in his acting career, he proceeded with the marriage; they had four daughters and one son.

In 1978, Lau first met the then 14-year-old Mary Jean Reimer, who was 30 years his junior and a fan of his. Lau helped Reimer in establishing her acting career. After divorcing his first wife and leaving the family, Lau married Reimer in 1984 and they had two daughters, Jeanne and Rosemary Lau.

=== Death ===
Lau died on 25 June 2013 at Union Hospital, Hong Kong. He had been battling leukemia for two decades.

== Filmography ==
=== As director ===
- 1975 The Spiritual Boxer - Director
- 1976 Challenge of the Masters - Director
- 1977 Executioners from Shaolin - Director
- 1978 36th Chamber of Shaolin - Director
- 1978 Deadly Strike / Breakout from Oppression - Director
- 1978 Shaolin Mantis - Director
- 1978 Heroes of the East - Director
- 1979 The Spiritual Boxer Part II - Director
- 1979 Dirty Ho - Director
- 1979 Mad Monkey Kung Fu - Director
- 1980 My Young Auntie - Director
- 1980 Return to the 36th Chamber - Director
- 1981 Martial Club - Director
- 1982 Legendary Weapons of China - Director, writer
- 1982 Cat vs Rat - Director
- 1983 Lady Is the Boss - Director
- 1984 The Eight Diagram Pole Fighter - Director, writer
- 1985 Disciples of the 36th Chamber - Director, writer
- 1986 Martial Arts of Shaolin - Director
- 1988 Tiger on the Beat - Director
- 1989 Aces Go Places 5: The Terracotta Hit - Director
- 1990 Tiger on the Beat 2 - Director
- 1994 Drunken Master II - Director
- 1994 Drunken Master III - Director
- 2002 Drunken Monkey - Director

=== As martial arts choreographer ===
Year	Title	Awards
1966	The Jade Bow	
1967	One-Armed Swordsman	
1967	The Assassin	
1968	Golden Swallow	
1969	Return of the One-Armed Swordsman	
1970	The Heroic Ones	
1971	The New One-Armed Swordsman	
1971	The Anonymous Heroes	
1972	Boxer From Shantung	
1972	The Water Margin	
1973	The Blood Brothers	
1973	Police Force	
1974	Heroes Two	
1974	Five Shaolin Masters	
1974	The Legend of the 7 Golden Vampires	
1975	Disciples of Shaolin	
1975	Bloody Avengers	
1976	Master of the Flying Guillotine	
1976	Challenge of the Masters	
1977	Executioners from Shaolin	
1978	36th Chamber of Shaolin	
1978	Shaolin Mantis	
1978	Shaolin Challenges Ninja	
1979	Mad Monkey Kung Fu	
1979	Dirty Ho	
1980	My Young Auntie	
1980	Return to the 36th Chamber	
1980	Clan of the White Lotus	
1982	Legendary Weapons of China	Nominated - Hong Kong Film Award for Best Action Choreography
1984	Invincible Pole Fighter	Nominated - Hong Kong Film Award for Best Action Choreography
1985	Disciples of the 36th Chamber	
1992	Operation Scorpio	
1994	Drunken Master II	Hong Kong Film Award for Best Action Choreography
2002	Drunken Monkey	
2005	Seven Swords	Nominated - Hong Kong Film Award for Best Action Choreography

=== As actor ===
- Brave Lad of Guangdong (1950)
- Huang Fei Hong yi gun fu san ba (1953) - Ah-Biu
- Huang Fei Hong wen zhen si pai lou (1955)
- Huang Fei Hong: Da nao Fo Shan (1956)
- Huang Fei Hong huo shao Daoshatou (1956) - Monkey Kwong
- Huang Fei Hong san xi nu biao shi (1956)
- Huang Fei Hong yi jiu long mu miao (1956)
- Huang Fei Hong nu tun shi er shi (1956) - Chiu Chung Bo
- Huang Fei Hong: Tie ji dou wu gong (1956) - Child
- Huang Fei Hong long zhou duo jin (1956)
- Huang Fei Hong Shamian fu shen quan (1956)
- Huang Fei-hong gong chuan jian ba (1956)
- Huang Fei Hong yong jiu mai yu can (1956) - Hing's Man 1
- Wu Song xue jian shi zi lou (1956)
- Huang Fei Hong Guanshan da he shou (1956) - Thug
- Huang Fei Hong gu si jiu qing seng (1956)
- Bi xue en chou wan gu qing (1956)
- Bai hao ying xiong chuan (1956)
- Huang Fei Hong shui di san qin Su Shulian (1956)
- Huang Fei Hong da nao hua deng (1956) - Kwok To
- Huang Fei Hong: Tian hou miao jin xiang (1956) - Elder
- Na Zha nao dong hai (1957) - 3rd Prince Dragon King
- Huang Fei Hong Henan yu xie zhan (1957)
- Huang Fei Hong shi wang zheng ba (1957) - Leung-chai
- Huang Fei Hong die xie ma an shan (1957)
- Huang Fei Hong da po fei dao dang (1957)
- Huang Fei-hong xie jian su po wu (1957) - Pirate
- Huang Fei Hong: Ye tan hei long shan (1957)
- Huang Fei Hong long zheng hu dou (1958)
- Huang Fei Hong lei tai dou wu hu (1958) - Shining Tiger
- Huang Fei Hong fu qi chu san hai (1958)
- Huang Fei Hong hu xue jiu Liang Kuan (1958)
- Story of the White-Haired Demon Girl (1959)
- Huo zang Lan Tou He (1959) - Disciple #2
- Huang Fei Hong bei kun hei di yu (1959)
- Huang Fei Hong hu peng fu hu (1959)
- Bai fa mo nu zhuan san ji da jie ju (1959)
- Huang Fei Hong lei tai zheng ba zhan (1960) - Lackey
- Nazha sheshan jiu mu (1960) - Mu Cha
- Xing xing wang da zhan Huang Fei Hong (1960) - Clawtooth 1
- Huang Fei Hong yuan da po wu hu zhen (1961) - Clawtooth 1
- Tai ping tian guo nu ying xiong (1961)
- Xian he shen zhen (1961)
- Kun lun qi jian dou wu long (1961)
- Fu gui rong hua di yi jia (1962)
- Lian huan mou sha an (1962) - Shot Thug (uncredited)
- Ru yan jing hun (1962) - Detective Lee
- Huo yan shan (1962)
- Na zha san dou hong hai er (1962) - Muk Cha
- Yue Fei chu shi (1962)
- Huang mao guai ren (1962) - Teddy boy
- Xi xue shen bian (1963)
- Huo shao gong lian si Shang ji (1963) - Lau Chee
- Huo shao gong lian si Xia ji (1963)
- Yi tian tu long ji xia ji (1963)
- Guai xia yan zi fei (1963)
- Nan long bei feng (1963)
- Luoyang qi xia zhuan (1964)
- Bai gu li hun zhen shang ji (1964)
- Bai gu li hun zhen xia ji (1964)
- Ru lai shen zhang shang ji (1964)
- Wan bian fei gu (1964) - Monkey of North Mountain
- Pan Jin Lian (1964)
- Qing xia qing chou (1964)
- Yi di xia yi xue shang ji (1965)
- Da di er nu (1965)
- Dao jian shuang lan (1965)
- Qing chang yi geng chang (1965)
- 999 Shen mi shuang shi an (1965) - Kidnapper
- Bao lian deng (1965)
- Zhui ziong ji (1965)
- Temple of the Red Lotus (1965)
- Hei mei gui (1965) - Rascal
- Yuan yang jian xia (1965)
- Tit gim jyu han seung jaap (1965)
- Yun hai yu gong yuan (1966)
- Nu sha shou (1966)
- Bian cheng san xia (1966)
- Nu xiu cai (1966)
- Sheng huo xiong feng da po huo lian zhen (1967)
- Yu nu jin gang (1967)
- Duan chang jian (1967)
- Nu tan hei tian e (1967) - Scoundrel
- Qin Jian En Chou (1967)
- Shen jian zhen jiang hu (1967)
- Jin ou (1967) - Henchman
- One-Armed Swordsman (1967) - Pa Shuang
- Mi ren xiao niao (1967)
- Mao yan nu lang (1967)
- Dao jian (1967)
- Nu jin gang da zhan du yan long (1967)
- Qi xia wu yi (1967) - Hsiang brother #1
- Da ci ke (1967)
- Wu di nu sha shou (1967)
- Yu mian fei hu (1968)
- Golden Swallow (1968) - Golden Dragon Branch Leader
- Fang Shi Yu san da mu ren xiang (1968)
- Fei xia xiao bai long (1968)
- The Sword of Swords (1968)
- Du bei dao wang (1969) - 'Ape Arms' Yuan Chen
- Shi er jin qian biao (1969)
- The Flying Dagger (1969)
- Shen da (1975)
- Challenge of the Masters (1976) - Chen Erh-fu
- Executioners from Shaolin (1977) - 3-Sectional Staff Fighter
- Heroes of the East (1978) - Drunken Master Su (Guest star)
- Mad Monkey Kung Fu (1979) - Chen
- Wu guan (1981) - Lion dance instructor
- My Young Auntie (1981) - Yu Ching-Chuen
- Legendary Weapons of China (1982) - Lei Kung
- Heroic Family (1983)
- Lady Is the Boss (1983) - Wang Hsia Yuan
- Invincible Pole Fighter (1984) - Hunter
- Disciples of the 36th Chamber (1985)
- Evil Cat (1987) - Master Cheung
- Heng cai san qian wan (1987) - Liang
- A Bloody Fight (1988) - Leung
- Pedicab Driver (1989) - Gambling House Boss
- Hak do fuk sing (1989) - Wong
- New Kids In Town (A.K.A New Killers In Town) (1990) - Uncle
- The Banquet (1991) - Master Lau / Uncle Nine
- The Twin Dragons (1992) - Doctor
- Operation Scorpio (1992) - Master Lo
- Drunken Master II (1994) - Master Fu Wen-Chi
- Drunken Master III (1994) - Uncle Yan
- Drunken Monkey (2002) - Master Man Bill
- Seven Swords (2005) - Fu Qingzhu (final film role)

== Awards and nominations ==
In 2005, Lau won a "Best Action Choreography" award at the Golden Horse Award for his action choreography work on Tsui Hark's Seven Swords. He also won another Golden Horse Award in 1994, for "Best Martial Arts Direction" in the film Drunken Master II (or The Legend of the Drunken Master). In 1995, Lau also won a "Best Action Choreography" award at the Hong Kong Film Awards for his choreography in Drunken Master II and in 1997, the film won "Best Film" at the Fantasia Film Festival. Lau was also nominated for a "Best Action Choreography" Hong Kong Film Award in 2006 for his work on Tsui Hark's Seven Swords, and nominated in 1983 for a "Best Action Choreography" Hong Kong Film Award for his work on Legendary Weapons of China (1982), which he also directed and wrote.

In 2010, Lau was honored with a Lifetime Achievement Award at the Hong Kong Film Awards for his contributions to the martial arts film genre.
