= Shaolin vs. Vampire =

1988 Japanese-Hong Kong film by Gordon Liu

- Title card

Japanese name
- Kanji: 激突！キョンシー小僧 VS 史上最強のカンフー悪魔軍団
- Literal meaning: Clash! Jiangshi Monk vs. the Strongest Kung Fu Demon Army in History
Transcriptions
- Revised Hepburn: Gekitotsu! Kyonshi kozo shijo saikyo no kanfu akuma gundan
- Written by: Toshio Azuchi
- Directed by: Gordon Liu (as Ryu Chafi)
- Starring: Gordon Liu (as Ryu Chafi)
- Countries of origin: Japan; Hong Kong
- Original language: Japanese

Production
- Editor: Takehiro Takatsu
- Running time: 90 minutes
- Production companies: Asahi Broadcasting Corporation; Osaka Totsu

Original release
- Network: TV Asahi
- Release: August 23, 1988

Shaolin vs. Vampire (激突！キョンシー小僧 VS 史上最強のカンフー悪魔軍団, Gekitotsu! Kyonshi kozo shijo saikyo no kanfu akuma gundan; literally Clash! Jiangshi Monk vs. the Strongest Kung Fu Demon Army in History) (also known as Baby Vampire Vs. The Invincible Shaolin Kung Fu Devil Gang), is a 1988 Japanese-language fantasy-comedy jiangshi television film directed by Gordon Liu. The film is a Japanese-Hong Kong co-production.

== Plot ==
In a village in Hong Kong in 1988, Daiyu is a stuntman who does not believe in jiangshi but is performing in a jiangshi film. His daughter Bee makes friends with a child jiangshi who gets separated from its class on a field trip to the land of the living and gets lost in the forest. Later, Bee becomes trapped in a house that a taoist priest sets fire in an attempt to kill a jiangshi. Bee is rescued by her jiangshi friend, but Bee's mother is trapped in the house when she attempts to rescue Bee, leaving Daiyu in a depressed state. A Japanese student named Hashimoto Yuko arrives in the village to study kung fu, and becomes Daiyu's pupil. Bee introduces her jiangshi friend to Daiyu, whose beliefs about jiangshi change. Together, Daiyu and Yuko they defend the village from an evil sorcerer attempting to take over their land with the aid of his jiangshi army.

== Cast ==
- Gordon Liu as Hyo Daiyu
- Yūki Kudō as Hashimoto Yuko
- Fong Yue (方茹) as Village Drunkard's Wife

== Release ==
The film was broadcast on TV Asahi at 8:00 p.m. on August 23, 1988. The film was not rated. It has also been released under the title Baby Vampire Vs. The Invincible Shaolin Kung Fu Devil Gang.

== Reception ==
The review website hkfilm.net gave the film a rating of 3 out of 10, writing, "from the first few minutes, it becomes painfully clear that Baby Vampire is a sub-par picture of the lowest order. [...] The film-makers intended for comedy to ensue and kung fu to splash across the screen as Daiyu fights to save his village from the actions of an evil necromantic Taoist priest. But all the audience gets to experience is mild ennui and sharp boredom for the next ninety or so minutes. [...] There is very little, if anything, of redeeming value to be found here." The review concludes, "All but the most diehard Gordon Liu fans are going to feel like they wasted ninety minutes of their life after watching this, and even those people will still probably feel some twinge of disappointment that one of their onscreen heroes lowered himself to appear in something as inept as this."

Reviewer Mutante de la Mesa 9 of the review website ondassercianas.com wrote, "Overall, it is entertaining, however, this was not the best of Gordon Liu's films. It tried to do some clever things, but perhaps didn't overcome its low budget and, probably, a short filming time. Shaolin vs. Vampire is a very peculiar movie".

In a review of the film, reviewer VinylCraft stated, "This movie is extremely fun and it's extremely light-hearted. This is not a serious movie at all. If I were to describe this movie in one word, I think it would be 'adorable'. This is probably the cutest movie with kung fu and vampires that you'll ever see. [...] The biggest problem with this movie is probably the quality of the film. This is obviously a very low-budget production and it was probably shot on video. [...] So the film quality is not great. The picture is kind of fuzzy. But I don't think that detracts from the quality of the story. I feel like the story is really good and the performances are excellent. [...] I would say this is probably a children's movie. [...] But do I recommend Shaolin vs. Vampire? 100% yes. Go ahead and watch it. It's a real feel-good movie and it's a lot of fun and I think that anybody can enjoy this movie."

Reviewer Mitch Reviews Everything stated, "This film is very unusual. It's unusual because I really didn't care for this one, as much as that pains me to say. [...] Children in movies just don't do it for me. [...] The other thing that's really bad in this one is how terrible the kung fu is. [...] This is absolutely one of Gordon Liu's worst kung fu efforts ever. [...] I give this one a huge, huge thumbs down for the jiangshi genre."

A review on the website jiangshimovie.blog.fc2.com notes that "it was shot in a home-video style". The review continues, "The makeup and costumes of the Kyong-Shi are as cheap as you can get. However, after watching the film several times, the home-video-like quality and the cheapness of the film make it seem more homey and relaxing, which is a strange thing. The adaptability of human beings never ceases to amaze me." The review concludes, "For those who picked up this work, you may be in a half-crying state after watching it, saying, 'You've got to be kidding me!' and you may want to smash the DVD (or VHS). But I want you to calm down and look at it from a different perspective. There are plenty of things to be irritated about, Liu Jiahui's action is still good, the sound effects during fighting are like those in Shobra's films, the insert song 'Summer Vacation of the Little Jiangshi Boy' is excellent [...] there are scenes that you may have seen before in some movies, and the content can be safely watched by children and families because there are no cruel descriptions... If you take these things into consideration when watching this film, it is quite an enjoyable film (I feel). Based on these facts, the film is quite enjoyable (I feel)."
