= Deadly Strike =

1978 Hong Kong film by Lau Kar-leung

- Film poster
- Traditional Chinese: 最佳搏殺
- Simplified Chinese: 最佳搏杀
- Hanyu Pinyin: Zuì Jiā Bó Shā
- Jyutping: Zeoi3 Gaai1 Bok3 Saat3
- Directed by: Lau Kar-leung; Gordon Liu
- Screenplay by: On Sze-to
- Produced by: Si Chu-yam
- Starring: Dean Shek; Gordon Liu; Paul Chun; Maggie Li; Fung Hark-on
- Cinematography: Ho Hak-wai
- Edited by: Tony Chow
- Music by: Stanley Chow
- Production companies: Ng Chow Film; Golden Tripod Film
- Release date: 17 June 1978 (Hong Kong)
- Running time: 96 minutes
- Country: Hong Kong
- Language: Cantonese
- Box office: HK$44,954.40

Deadly Strike, also known in the West as Breakout from Oppression, is a 1978 Hong Kong martial arts action film directed Lau Kar-leung and his adopted brother Gordon Liu, the latter helming his directorial debut. The film stars Liu alongside Dean Shek.

== Plot ==
To Tsao-chan is a warlord who risked his life to escape from the army. He rushes home and outside his house he sees three men running for the door. To hurried into his house and sees his mother and ten-year-old sister killed while his older sister is also injured. His neighbor Siu Sam-chi's right eye was also wounded. Then the dying Sam interprets the incident to To that three thieves passed by and was fascinated by the beauty of To's sister and then proceeded to gang rape her, while his mother and younger sister was yelling and the thieves killed the two. Sam tries to come by to help but was injured by the thieves. Sam dies after finishing his last sentence. To has a strong heart and have concluded who the murderer is.

In town, a mean man named Au San-yeh owns a firework factory who treats his workers as slaves while not paying them fairly. To avenge his family, To pretends to help Au against the Cheung brothers who always opposes him. After big fights, To later found out the murderer was actually Sam.

== Cast ==
- Dean Shek as Cheung Tsai
- Gordon Liu as To Tsao-chan
- Paul Chun as Cheung Chiu-ming
- Maggie Li as Hsiu Tsui
- Fung Hark-on as Au San-yeh
- Ho Kei-cheong as Chung Ting-fu
- Wong Chu-tong as Worker hired to blow up To
- Lam Lau as blind mother
- Lo Wai as Police chief
- Lau Chun-fai as Police constable
- Chui Chung-hok as murder victim
- Chan Keung as San Yeh's thug, follows Tu
- Huang Ha as Yai Man, San-yeh's thug
- Chik Ngai-hung as San-yeh's thug
- Chui Fat as San-yeh's thug
- Ho Po-sing as San-yeh's thug
- Law Keung as San-yeh's thug
- Chan Dik-hak as San-yeh's thug
- Yam Sai-kwoon as San-yeh's thug
- Yang Chi-fun
- Shut Wing-chong
- Ho Bing
- San Sing as angry worker
- Tam Po
- Lai Yan
- Jane Kwan

== Box office ==
The film grossed HK$44,954.40 at the Hong Kong box office during its theatrical run from 17 to 20 June 1978 in Hong Kong.
