= Hsiao Ho (actor) =

- Born: Hou Yao-chung (侯耀中); 1 January 1958; Mei County (now Meixian District), Guangdong, China
- Education: Spring and Autumn Chinese Opera School (Pink Chrysanthemum Chinese Opera School)
- Occupations: Actor; martial artist; acrobat; action director; action choreographer; stuntman; Shaw Brothers/Chinese Opera star
- Years active: 1976–2004

Chinese name
- Simplified Chinese: 小侯
Transcriptions
Standard Mandarin
- Hanyu Pinyin: Xiǎo Hóu
Yue: Cantonese
- Jyutping: Siu Hau
- Musical career
- Also known as: Monkey
- Origin: Hong Kong

Hsiao Ho, (Hsiao Hou) (Chinese: 小侯; pinyin: Xiǎo Hóu; Cantonese: Siu Hau, born 2 March 1958 in Meixian District, Guangdong, China) is a Hong Kong martial arts film actor, stunt performer and action choreographer. A Hakka, he has acted in many films directed by Lau Kar-leung, including Mad Monkey Kung Fu and Legendary Weapons of China. In 1985 he portrayed legendary kung fu warrior Fong Sai-Yuk in the Lau directed action-comedy, Disciples of the 36th Chamber and also took a lead role in Fake Ghost Catchers, directed by Lau Kar Wing. Fake Ghost Catchers is marketed by Celestial Pictures as being made two years before Ghostbusters (implying that the idea for Ghostbusters may have come from the movie). Hou is also known for portraying the "disfigured swordsman" and doubling complicated action scenes in 1993's Iron Monkey. He was also the action director for the movie Shaolin Avengers (1994). In 1982, he was nominated for Best Action Choreography for the movie Legendary Weapons of China (for which he was action director) at the Hong Kong Film Awards alongside Lau Kar Leung and Ching Chu who also provided choreography for the film.

Born Hao Yiu Chung, he was trained in Beijing opera by Fan Kuk-Fa as a child and acted in films. He moved to the United States in the 1960s with classmates where he learned acrobatics from different instructors under the watchful tutelage of Fan Kuk-Fa. He later returned to Hong Kong, and at age 17, became a martial arts stunt performer, which led to his starring role in Mad Monkey Kung Fu in 1979. He then became a contracted actor with Shaw Brothers Studio and studied Hung Gar, a specialised Kung Fu under Lau Kar Leung.

A very young man at the time, he was always cast by director Lau Kar Leung as the rebellious teen. In the cult classic My Young Auntie, Hou played the energetic rebellious teenage son of Lau Kar Leung. In Disciples of the 36th Chamber, he also played the rebellious son. Because of an ability to perform difficult stunts and acrobatics with ease, Hsiao Hou was often cast in roles that required an expert stunt performer and martial artist. While his career did not reach the popularity of frequent co-stars Gordon Liu or Kara Hui, he is considered a Shaw Brothers legend by legions of fans and is highly regarded for martial arts, comedic talents, and acrobatic talent. Lau Kar Leung was once quoted as calling Hou the most "talented action actor (or star)" in his class.

Hsiao Hou's last known interview was in February 2017 taken by Daniel O'Leary (Drone Story Korea). It can be found on YouTube and was filmed at the Shaw Brothers Studios in Hong Kong. Though he was not featured on the cover in western versions of the popular Shaw Brothers releases, Hsiao Hou took the starring roles in Mad Monkey Kung Fu, Legendary Weapons of China, Disciples of the 36th Chamber, Fake Ghost Catchers, and My Young Auntie. He later acted in small supporting roles in films by Sammo Hung.

He has also been a martial arts and action director/choreographer.

== Filmography ==
=== Films ===
This is a partial list of films.

- Dirty Ho (1976) - Hsia Liu
- Shaolin Mantis (1977) - Governor's Henchman (uncredited)
- The Iron Fisted Monk (1977) - Bearded monk
- Mian meng xin jing (1977)
- He Has Nothing But Kung Fu (1977)
- The 36th Chamber of Shaolin (1978) - Shaolin disciple
- Gui ma kuang chao (1978)
- Tang lang (1978)
- Heroes of the East (1978)
- Dirty Tiger, Crazy Frog (1978)
- Spiritual Boxer 2 (1979) - Chou's man
- Mad Monkey Kung Fu (1979) - Monkey
- Way of the Black Dragon (1979)
- Kung Fu Genius (1979)
- Clan of the White Lotus (1980) - Personal Swordsman of White Lotus
- Nan bei tui wang (1980)
- Return to the 36th Chamber (1980) - Ho Chiao
- Martial Club (1981) - Mai Chen-Huo
- My Young Auntie (1981) - Charlie Yu Tao
- Legendary Weapons of China (1982) - Tieh A-hou
- The Fake Ghost Catchers (1982)
- The Treasure Hunters (1982)
- Cat Versus Rat (1982) - Chiang Ping
- Aces Go Places 2 (1983) - Gangster in Club
- The Lady is the Boss (1983)
- Eight-Diagram Pole Fighter (1984) - Yang Sze-lang
- Crazy Shaolin Disciples (1985)
- Disciples of the 36th Chamber (1985) - Fang Shih Yu
- Heart of Dragon (1985)
- Yes Madam! (1985) - Tin's Thug
- Millionaire's Express (1986) - Siu Hau
- Lucky Stars Go Places (1986) - Policeman
- Mr Vampire 2 (1986) - Lab Tech
- Righting Wrongs (1986) - Thug (uncredited)
- Eastern Condors (1987)
- Paper Marriage (1988)
- Righting Wrongs 2: Blonde Fury (1989)
- Pedicab Driver (1989)
- Demoness from Thousand Years (1990) - The Teacher
- The Moon Warriors (1992)
- What a Hero! (1992) - Crime Boss
- Iron Monkey (1993) - Hin Hung's disciple #2
- The Green Hornet (1994)
- Drugs Fighters (1995)
- Thunderbolt (1995) - Kong's Thug / Cop (uncredited)
- One Nite in Mongkok (2004) - (cameo appearance)
