= Drunken Master III =

1994 Hong Kong film by Lau Kar-leung

- Film poster
- Traditional Chinese: 醉拳III
- Simplified Chinese: 醉拳III
- Hanyu Pinyin: Zuì Quán Sān
- Jyutping: Zeoi3 Kyun4 Saam1
- Directed by: Lau Kar-leung
- Written by: Stanley Siu
- Produced by: Chris Lee
- Starring: Andy Lau; Michelle Reis; Willie Chi; Simon Yam; Lau Kar-leung; Adam Cheng; Gordon Liu; William Ho
- Cinematography: Peter Ngor
- Edited by: Siu Nam
- Music by: Mak Chun Hung
- Production company: Super Film Production
- Distributed by: Modern Films and Entertainment
- Release date: 2 July 1994 (Hong Kong)
- Running time: 91 minutes
- Country: Hong Kong
- Language: Cantonese
- Box office: HK$7,076,791

Drunken Master III is a 1994 Hong Kong martial arts film directed by Lau Kar-leung and starring Andy Lau, Michelle Reis, Willie Chi, Simon Yam, Lau Kar-leung, Adam Cheng and Gordon Liu. This film was quickly produced after director Lau and Jackie Chan fell out on the set of Drunken Master II with the style of action and Lau decided to produce a more authentic entry in the Drunken Master film series. Despite the title, Drunken Master III is not a sequel to the Drunken Master film series and is widely considered an imitator.

== Plot ==
At the turn of the century of China, the White Lotus Society plots to put the sinister Manchu Emperor Yuan Shikai (William Ho) to become the Emperor of China. However, he needs to be given a Jade Ring possessed by his fiancé, Princess Sum-yuk (Michelle Reis). The White Lotus Society gets Yeung Kwan (Andy Lau) to get the princess. However, Yeung is actually a rebel leader working for Sun Yat-sen and he abducts Sum-yuk and find refuge at the Po Chi Lam clinic owned by Wong Kei-ying (Adam Cheng) with his mischievous son, Wong Fei-hung (Willie Chi). Later, Fei-hung gets involved with Yeung and Sum-yuk and end up on the run together. Along the way, Fei-hung later learns the secrets of Drunken Boxing from an old master, Uncle Yan (Lau Kar-leung).

== Cast ==
- Andy Lau as Yeung Kwan
- Michelle Reis as Princess Sum-yuk
- Willie Chi as Wong Fei-hung
- Simon Yam as Gay bus passenger
- Lau Kar-leung as Uncle Yan
- Adam Cheng as Wong Kei-ying
- Gordon Liu as Governor Lee
- William Ho as Yuan Shikai
- Jimmy Lau
- Woo Kin-keung
- Lee Kwok-man
- Daniel Chan
- Zhang Lei
- Brad Allan as Bus passenger
- Lau Heung-yeung
- Ma Lee-hung
- Luk Lan-fung
- Chow Man-wai
- To Man-hung
- Sze Sui-fan
- Fong Wai-chung
- Chou Jing
- Hon Man-kit
- Hau Chan-yu
- Luk Siu-pang
- Giorgio Pasotti as White Lotus Clan Leader
- Chow Man
- Chin Hiu-kwan
- Kwok Nai-ming
- Zhang Teng
- Suen Ka-wing
- Tsui Fai
- Cheung Yiu-man

== Reception ==
LoveHKFilm gave the film a negative review: "What looked like it could be a semi-fun Hong Kong flick completely devolves after 30 minutes, turning the proceedings into a banal, mind-numbingly tedious series of fights, hijinks, and unnecessary dialogue."

== Box office ==
The film grossed HK$7,076,791 in its theatrical from 2 to 20 July 1994 in Hong Kong.

== See also ==
- Andy Lau filmography
- Wong Fei-hung filmography
