= Drunken Master II =

1994 Hong Kong film by Lau Kar-leung

- Drunken Master II film poster

Chinese name
- Traditional Chinese: 醉拳二
- Simplified Chinese: 醉拳二
Transcriptions
Standard Mandarin
- Hanyu Pinyin: Zuì Quán Èr
Yue: Cantonese
- Jyutping: Zeoi3 Kyun4 Ji6
- Directed by: Lau Kar-leung
- Screenplay by: Edward Tang; Tong Man-ming; Yuen Chieh-chi
- Produced by: Eric Tsang; Edward Tang; Barbie Tung
- Starring: Jackie Chan; Anita Mui; Ti Lung; Felix Wong; Lau Kar-leung
- Cinematography: Jingle Ma; Tony Cheung; Cheung Yiu-cho; Nico Wong
- Edited by: Peter Cheung
- Music by: William Hu; Michael Wandmacher
- Production companies: Golden Harvest; Paragon Films; Hong Kong Stuntmen Association
- Distributed by: Golden Harvest
- Release date: 3 February 1994
- Running time: 102 minutes
- Country: Hong Kong
- Languages: Cantonese; English
- Budget: HK$10 million
- Box office: US$34 million (est.)

Drunken Master II (Chinese: 醉拳二; Cantonese Yale: Jui Kuen II) is a 1994 Hong Kong action-comedy kung fu film directed by Lau Kar-leung and starring Jackie Chan as Chinese martial arts master and a Cantonese folk hero, Wong Fei-hung. It was Chan's first traditional style martial arts film since Fearless Hyena Part II (1983). The film was released in North America as The Legend of Drunken Master in 2000.

The film is a sequel to Chan's 1978 film Drunken Master, directed by Yuen Woo-ping. Another film, Drunken Master III (1994, directed by Lau Kar-Leung) features little in common with either this or its predecessor, and is not considered a sequel. In 2005, Drunken Master II was named one of the top 100 best films of all time by Time magazine. In 2015, the British Film Institute (BFI) selected Drunken Master II as one of the ten best action movies of all time.

== Plot ==
The film is set in early 20th century China. Wong Fei-hung, along with his father Wong Kei-ying and servant Tso, is on the way home to Canton after a trip to the Northeast when he encounters Fu Wen-chi, a former top candidate in the Qing era's military examination. After an exchange of blows, Wong and Fu accidentally switch the boxes they had been fighting over. Wong ends up with the Imperial Seal while Fu gets the ginseng that Wong's father had bought for a client. Unknown to Wong, the Imperial Seal is one of numerous Chinese artifacts that the British consul is trying to smuggle out of China to Britain.

Back in Canton, Wong gives the client a root from his father's favourite bonsai to pass off as the ginseng. Wong's stepmother, Ling, complicates things when she tries to help Wong by loaning her necklace for money for Wong to buy a new ginseng; their neighbours mistakenly believe that the Wongs are in financial difficulty. In the meantime, the British consul sends his henchmen to track down Wong and seize the Imperial Seal. A fight breaks out between Wong and the henchmen when the latter try to snatch a bag from Ling, thinking that it contains the Seal. At Ling's instigation, Wong gets drunk and uses drunken boxing to beat up the henchmen until his father shows up and stops him. The older Wong is furious at his son for embarrassing their family by getting drunk and fighting in public. To make matters worse, the client falls sick after consuming the fake ginseng and his wife informs Wong's father about it. After he learns the truth behind the ginseng and bonsai, the older Wong becomes so angry that he hits his son and chases him out of the house.

When Wong tries to drown his sorrow by drinking heavily, he gets beaten up and publicly humiliated by the henchmen because he is too drunk to fight back. After his family saves him and brings him home, Wong feels deeply ashamed of his drunken behaviour and apologizes to his father, saying that he will never drink again. Meanwhile, Fu Wen-chi visits the Wong residence and tells them about the British consul's smuggling operation. The next day, Fu and Wong are attacked at a restaurant by the Axe Gang, a group of thugs hired by the consul. Fu is fatally shot and the Imperial Seal is taken by the consul's men. Before dying, Fu implores Wong and his friends to retrieve the Seal and stop the consul from stealing Chinese artifacts.

One night, Wong and his friend, Tsang, disguise themselves and break into the British consulate. They are caught, assaulted and held for ransom by the consul, who demands that Wong's father sells his land in exchange for their release; the older Wong reluctantly agrees. Later, Wong's friends discover that the British consul is planning to smuggle the stolen artifacts out of Canton using boxes meant for steel shipments. They inform Wong and Tsang, who then join the workers in a violent protest at the British-owned steel factory against the consul's abuses. Out of desperation, he breaks his promise and drinks again in order to use drunken boxing technique to overcome John, the consul's chief enforcer. After a long fight, Wong and his friends defeat the consul's henchmen and put an end to the smuggling operation. At the end of the movie, a Chinese general presents the Wongs a commemorative plaque to honor them for their service to the country and to offer Wong a job, only to find that Wong has become blind and mentally handicapped due to drinking industrial alcohol.

== Cast ==
- Jackie Chan as Wong Fei-hung
- Anita Mui as Ling
- Ti Lung as Wong Kei-ying
- Felix Wong as Fishmonger Tsang
- Lau Kar-leung as Fu Wen-chi
- Ho Wing-fong as Fun
- Chin Kar-lok as Fo-sang
- Lau Kar-yung as Marlon
- Ram Chiang as Tso
- Ken Lo as John
- Ho-Sung Pak as Henry
- Andy Lau as Zhang Xueliang / counter-intelligence officer
- Suki Kwan as Mrs Chiu
- Yvonne Yung as a lady in the coffee shop
- Vindy Chan as a lady in the coffee shop
- Hon Yee-sang as Uncle Hing
- Lau Siu-ming as Mr Chiu
- Wong Shing as Larry
- Chan Kwok-kuen as Curly
- Tai Po as Moe
- Sandy Chan as Lily
- Pau Fong as cook
- Ha Chun-chau as a senior in the restaurant
- Szema Wah Lung as a senior in the restaurant
- Yan Pak as Mrs Chan
- Louis C. Roth as the British consul
- Therese Renee as Terese
- Vincent Tuatanne as Bruno
- Mark Houghton as Smith
- Cao Ying as a maid
- Mars as a thug (uncredited)
- Bill Tung as the Chinese general (uncredited)

== Stunt fight scenes and martial arts ==
In Drunken Master 2, there are several fight scenes in which one can observe the different fighting styles. The fighting styles observed in the film during the fight scenes are:

- In the fight scene on the train, at the beginning of the film, between Wong Fei-hung (Jackie Chan) and Fu Wen-chi (Lau Kar-leung), both Wong Fei-hung and Fu Wen-chi use the Hung Ga, in addition to weapons known as the spear (or Qiang), used by Fu Wen-chi and the Tiger Sword, used by Wong Fei-hung.
- In the fight scene at the restaurant, Wong Fei-hung and Fu Wen-chi uses both Hung Ga and Shaolin Kung Fu, while the henchmen use the Xingyiquan.
- In the fight scene in the central square of the city, Wong Fei-hung uses the Drunken boxing against the main antagonist's goons.
- In the savage final fight scene between Wong Fei-hung and one of the main antagonists, John (Ken Lo) uses Taekwondo against Wong Fei-hung and uses typical Taekwondo kicks to try to defeat him. Wong Fei-hung on the other hand uses one of the most popular styles of Drunken boxing, the Daoist style or the Drunken Eight Immortals style to counter attack John (Note: Ken Lo is a black belt in Taekwondo and has won numerous tournaments with this martial art).

== Home media ==
No DVD has been made available to date that preserves the original aspect ratio and the uncut version of the film with the original Cantonese audio track. The film's purest English-friendly version can only be found on now out-of-print releases – the Mei Ah VCD and LaserDisc, Tai Seng's VHS (itself a recording of the Mei Ah LaserDisc) and the Australian VHS from Chinatown Video (a sub label of Siren Visual). These prints have "burnt-in" Chinese/English subtitles. An uncut release with good picture quality, the original audio track, and the original aspect ratio is considered a "holy grail" by many Hong Kong cinema fans.

Thakral's region 0 DVD release of Drunken Master II was the only official DVD which featured the uncut version with proper English subtitles. However, instead of the original Hong Kong theatrical version, it contains the Chinese print. The Chinese print is identical to the Hong Kong print except for one major difference: the scene of Fei-Hung drunkenly singing at the outdoor restaurant is re-cut and re-edited with alternative footage so that Fei-Hung is singing a different song in Mandarin instead of Cantonese. Thakral's aspect ratio is cropped to 1.78:1 from the original theatrical 2.35:1 aspect ratio.

The region 3 releases for Hong Kong and Korea contains the English export version with the original 2.35:1 non-anamorphic aspect ratio. This cut of the film ends almost immediately after Fei-Hung defeats John. The audio tracks include an abridged Cantonese and Mandarin soundtracks, and the original Golden Harvest English dub different than that of Dimension's. It contains the original score and sound effects, but there are no English subtitles.

Of all the films in Chan's back-catalogue that received North American theatrical distribution, Drunken Master II was cut the least. A scene in which Wong drunkenly sings at a café was re-cut slightly, making use of a few alternate takes not seen in the original Cantonese version. In addition, a 35 second cut was made to the concluding scene of the film which showed Wong blinded and mentally crippled as a result of drinking industrial alcohol during the film's ultimate fight. Played for laughs, the scene was considered to be in bad taste by the American distributor, Dimension Films.

In addition to the cut, other significant changes made to the US release including the change of title (to Legend of Drunken Master), an English-language dub (Chan dubbed himself), and a new musical score. The re-dubbed soundtrack also meant that sound effects were different, in some instances completely altering the rhythm of the fight scenes.

The English dub also makes references to animal kung fu styles such as Drunken Monkey, as well as made-up names for random moves during the first two instances that Wong Fei-hung uses drunken boxing. The original dialogue referenced the Eight Drunken Immortals technique, which was also featured in Drunken Master (1978) based on the real-life Daoist style of Drunken Fist. The change was most likely done to compensate for the general western audience's unfamiliarity with Chinese mythology and the first film.

The Australian (region 4) and Japanese (region 2) release featured the same cuts and re-scoring as the US release.

A Blu-ray version was released on 15 September 2009, in the United States, which features the cut US version in the original 2.35:1 aspect ratio.

In the UK it was released on Blu-ray 16 April 2012 under the title The Legend of Drunken Master.

The original, uncut Hong Kong version was finally made available on Blu-ray in China, Korea and Japan, courtesy of Warner Bros., on 11 October 2018 under the title Drunken Master II.

== Reception ==
=== Box office ===
Drunken Master II was a notable success in Hong Kong, grossing an all-time record of HK$40,971,484 (US$5,301,693) during its theatrical run. The success was somewhat surprising, considering reports of tension on the set between Chan and Lau Kar Leung.

By January 1995, the film had grossed US$17.3 million from five other East Asian territories. It grossed CN¥10 million in China, and NT$39,889,970 in Taiwan, where it was one of the year's top ten highest-grossing films. In Japan, the film grossed ¥726 million. In South Korea, it sold 1,136,145 tickets and grossed US$5.45 million, making it the year's top-grossing film in the country.

Six years after its original release, Drunken Master II was released in 1,345 North American theaters as The Legend of Drunken Master by Dimension Films in 2000. This re-edited version made US$3,845,278 ($2,865 per screen) in its opening weekend, on its way to a US$11,555,430 total in the United States and Canada. Upon its 2000 release in France, the film sold 28,681 tickets, equivalent to an estimated €154,877 (US$143,405). Combined, the film's total estimated worldwide gross was approximately US$34,300,528, equivalent to US$75 million adjusted for inflation.

=== Critical response ===
Roger Ebert, writing in the Chicago Sun-Times, gave the film three-and-a-half stars out of a possible four:

When I did a seminar at the Hawaii Film Festival several years ago, comparing the physical comedy of Chan and Buster Keaton, martial arts fans brought in their bootleg Hong Kong laser discs of this film and told me that I had to see the final 20-minute fight sequence. They were correct. Coming at the end of a film filled with jaw-dropping action scenes, this extended virtuoso effort sets some kind of benchmark: It may not be possible to film a better fight scene.

In Entertainment Weekly, Lisa Schwarzbaum gave the film an A− grade and wrote:

A half dozen years after its Asian release, and over two decades after the original Drunken Master made Jackie Chan a star in Hong Kong, The Legend of Drunken Master may be the most kick-ass demonstration yet, for the majority of American moviegoers, of what the fuss is all about: To many aficionados (who know the video as Drunken Master II), this 1994 favorite, remastered and dubbed in "classic" bad Chinese-accented English, showcases Chan in his impish glory, dazzling in his ability to make serious, complicated fighting look like devil-may-care fun.

Time magazine listed Drunken Master II as one of the All-Time 100 Movies as chosen by Time's movie critics Richard Corliss and Richard Schickel:

The most important and entertaining star of east Asian cinema, Jackie Chan survived a boyhood in a punishing Peking Opera School, and his early screen days as "the next Bruce Lee" to create his own genre of martial-arts comedies .. Jackie starred in, and directed, many wonderful action films in his pre-Hollywood days. This one can stand at the peak.

James Berardinelli was one of the less fervent reviewers:

The Legend of Drunken Master is pretty typical Hong Kong Chan fare – five superior action sequences with a lot of failed comedy and mindless drivel padding out the running length. Most of the expository and character-building scenes fall into one of three categories: (1) inane, (2) incomprehensible, or (3) dull. The tone is also wildly inconsistent. Some sequences are laced with slapstick comedy while others are acutely uncomfortable as a result of torture and the nearly-abusive disciplining of a grown child by a parent. (Differences in culture make the latter seem more incongruous to American viewers than to Chinese movie-goers.) So it's up to the action to redeem the film – a feat it succeeds at, at least to a point.

On Rotten Tomatoes, Drunken Master II has an aggregated review score of 85% based on 81 critic reviews, the site's critical consensus reads: "Jackie Chan sends up some amazing and entertaining fight sequences in The Legend of Drunken Master."

=== Awards and nominations ===
In 2015, the British Film Institute (BFI) selected Drunken Master II as one of the 10 best action movies of all time.

Awards and nominations
Ceremony	Category	Recipient	Result
14th Hong Kong Film Awards	Best Action Choreography	Lau Kar-leung, Jackie Chan Stunt Team	Won
14th Hong Kong Film Awards	Best Film Editing	Peter Cheung	Nominated
31st Golden Horse Awards	Best Action Choreography	Lau Kar-leung, Jackie Chan Stunt Team	Won
2nd Fant-Asia Film Festival	Best Asian Film	Drunken Master II	Won

== See also ==
- Jackie Chan filmography
- Andy Lau filmography
- List of Hong Kong films
- List of martial arts films
