= Drunken Monkey (film) =

2003 Hong Kong film by Lau Kar-leung

- Film poster
- Traditional Chinese: 醉馬騮
- Simplified Chinese: 醉马骝
- Hanyu Pinyin: Zuì Mǎliú
- Jyutping: Zeoi3 Maa3lau4
- Directed by: Lau Kar-leung
- Written by: Li Pak-ling
- Produced by: Mona Fong
- Starring: Lau Kar-leung; Wu Jing; Shannon Yao; Chik Kun-kwan
- Cinematography: Wong Po-man
- Edited by: Kai Kit-wai
- Music by: Tommy Wai
- Production company: Shaw Brothers Studio
- Release date: 5 May 2003
- Running time: 97 minutes
- Country: Hong Kong
- Language: Cantonese
- Box office: HK$ 153,560

Drunken Monkey is a 2003 Hong Kong martial arts comedy film starring and directed by Lau Kar-leung in his last film directorial effort before his death on 25 June 2013. The film co-stars Wu Jing, Lau Wing-kina, and Shannon Yao. It was the first kung fu film released by the Shaw Brothers Studio in over 2 decades as well as the first Shaw Brothers movie to be released in the 21st century.

== Cast ==
- Lau Kar-leung as Master Man Bill
- Wu Jing as Great Uncle Tak
- Lau Wing-kin as Chan Kai-yip
- Shannon Yao as Siu-ma
- Chi Kuan-chun as Yui Hoi-yeung
- Gordon Liu as Detective Hung Yat Fu
- Lau Kar-wing as Fighter in the beginning
- Li Hai-tao

== Release ==
Drunken Monkey was released theatrically in Hong Kong on 5 May 2003. It grossed a total of HK$153,560.

== Reception ==
Ken Eisner of Variety wrote that the film's fight choreography overcomes its cheesiness and derivative story. David Cornelius of DVD Talk rated it 3/5 stars and wrote, "When the action's on, 'Drunken Monkey' is a total blast. When the action's off, 'Drunken Monkey' is a total snooze."
