= Challenge of the Masters =

1976 Hong Kong film by Lau Kar-leung

- Film poster
- Directed by: Lau Kar-Leung
- Written by: Ni Kuang
- Produced by: Run Run Shaw
- Starring: Chen Kuan-tai; Gordon Liu
- Cinematography: Tien-You Wang
- Edited by: Ha Ta-wei
- Music by: Frankie Chan
- Production company: Shaw Brothers Studio
- Release date: May 7, 1976 (Hong Kong)
- Running time: 97 minutes
- Country: Hong Kong
- Language: Cantonese

Challenge of the Masters (Chinese: 陸阿采與黃飛鴻) is a 1976 Hong Kong action film directed by Lau Kar Leung.

== Plot ==
After his father refuses to teach him kung fu and he is constantly being beaten by rival school students, a young Wong Fei Hung must train under Lu A-Cai to avenge the evils being done by the rival school.

== Cast ==
Cast adapted from Shaw Brothers Volume 1 home video set.

- Gordon Liu as Wong Fei Hung
- Chen Kuan-tai as Lu A-Cai
- Lily Li as Xiulien
- Kong Do as Renliang
- Chiang Yang as Wong Kei-ying
- Lau Kar-wing as Yuan Zheng
- Cheng Kang-yeh as Zeng Xing
- Feng Ko-an as Yangzhong
- Lau Lar-leung as Zehn Er-hu
- Shih Chung-tien as Peng Yungang

== Release ==
Challenge of the Masters was released in Hong Kong on May 7, 1976.
