= Gordon Liu =

Hong Kong actor and martial artist (b. 1955)

- 劉家輝
- Born: Sin Kam-hei (冼錦熙); August 22, 1951 (age 75); Foshan, Guangdong, China
- Occupations: Actor; martial artist; director; producer
- Years active: 1973–2014
- Style: Hung Ga
- Spouse: Ma Fei-feng (m. 1991; div. 2009) (2nd)
- Children: 4

Chinese name
- Traditional Chinese: 劉家輝
- Simplified Chinese: 刘家辉
Transcriptions
Standard Mandarin
- Hanyu Pinyin: Liú Jiāhuī
- Wade–Giles: Liu Chia-hui
Yue: Cantonese
- Jyutping: Lau^{4} Gaa^{1}-fai^{1}

Sin Kam-hei
- Traditional Chinese: 冼錦熙
- Simplified Chinese: 冼锦熙
Transcriptions
Standard Mandarin
- Hanyu Pinyin: Xiǎn Jǐnxī
- Wade–Giles: Hsien³ Chin³-hsi¹

Gordon Liu Chia-hui (Note: simplified Chinese: 刘家辉; traditional Chinese: 劉家輝; pinyin: Liú Jiāhuī; Wade–Giles: Liu Chia-hui; Jyutping: Lau4 Gaa1 fai1) (born Sin Kam-hei, (Note: simplified Chinese: 冼锦熙; traditional Chinese: 冼錦熙; pinyin: Xiǎn Jǐnxī) August 22, 1951) is a retired Hong Kong actor, martial artist, and filmmaker, best known for his roles in martial arts films. He was one of the biggest male stars of Shaw Brothers Studio's martial arts cinema during the 1970s and 1980s.

Born in Guangdong, Liu studied Hung Ga kung fu at the school founded by Lau Kar-leung's father, Lau Cham. He entered the Hong Kong film industry as a stuntman. His early acting credits include minor roles in several Hong Kong kung fu films, including the Shaw Brothers-produced 5 Shaolin Masters (1974). He went on to appear in many Shaw Brothers films, such as Challenge of the Masters (1976), in which he portrayed the folk hero Wong Fei Hung, Executioners from Shaolin (1977), The 36th Chamber of Shaolin (1978), in which he played the lead role as Shaolin hero San Te, Dirty Ho (1979), Return to the 36th Chamber (1980), Martial Club (1981), The Eight Diagram Pole Fighter (1984), and Disciples of the 36th Chamber (1985). By the late-1980’s, he had begun accepting smaller roles, such as in Lau Kar-leung's Tiger on the Beat (1988). In 1993, he appeared opposite Jet Li in Last Hero in China.

Liu made his American film debut in 2003. He played two roles in Quentin Tarantino's Kill Bill films: Johnny Mo, the leader of the Crazy 88 yakuza gang in Volume 1 (2003), and kung fu master Pai Mei in Volume 2 (2004). Other than being a staple in Hong Kong action movies and his foray into Hollywood, Liu also made his Bollywood debut in 2009's Chandni Chowk to China.

In 2020, Liu was inducted into the Martial Arts History Museum Hall of Fame.

== Early life ==
Liu was born Sin Kam-hei (traditional Chinese: 冼錦熙; simplified Chinese: 冼锦熙) in Foshan, Guangdong Province, China on August 22, 1951, prior to his adoption into another family. He is often wrongly cited as being the adopted son of Lau Cham, and adoptive brother of directors and actors Lau Kar-leung (Liu Chia-liang) and Lau Kar-wing (Liu Chia-yung). He was not adopted by the family, but is Lau Cham's godson, and adopted his surname (traditional Chinese: 劉; simplified Chinese: 刘; pinyin: Liú; Jyutping: Lau^{4}) as his professional name.

In his youth (ages 15–20), he skipped school to train in Chinese martial arts without his parents' knowledge. He trained at Lau Cham's martial arts school of Hung Gar discipline, which descended from Wong Fei-hung's grand student (father to Lau Kar Leung). Lau Cham's wife assisted in his training and due to the friendship and respect Liu felt for Lau and his wife, he took on the name Lau Ka-fai. As he grew up, he found a job as a shipping clerk to make ends meet. His interests had always been towards martial arts and he was eventually offered a role by Lau Kar-leung.

== Career ==
Liu's first break was with Chang's Film Company (a Shaw Brothers subsidiary operating in Taiwan) acting small parts for such films as 5 Shaolin Masters, Shaolin Martial Arts, and 4 Assassins. He starred in Challenge of the Masters (1976), as the folk hero Wong Fei Hung, and was featured in Executioners From Shaolin (1977) before starring in his signature role as Shaolin hero San Te in The 36th Chamber of Shaolin.

The tale of the imperialistic struggle, while not a new one, was significant for the intense focus placed on the inner workings of Shaolin Temple itself. San Te, Liu's character, overcomes the temple's thirty-five chambers as he unwittingly undergoes the rigorous training regimen imposed by the temple's Head Abbott on the pretext of "earning" a right to study martial arts there.

The "zero-to-hero" tale turned Liu into an international icon in spite of a frame far slighter than that of the folk hero himself (known as "Iron Arms" for the muscularity of his physique) and paved the way for a very healthy working schedule into the mid-1990s, even as younger, more agile martial artists eventually emerged. By the late 1980s, he had begun accepting smaller roles, such as in Lau Kar-leung's Tiger on the Beat.

Liu has also been active in television, and was contracted to Hong Kong's TVB company for many years, continuing playing roles as a martial arts master. Though still performing some martial arts roles, he is at home as well in comedic, self-deprecatory or emotional characters. His second-most common role in TVB has been playing a Hong Kong Police Force officer.

Quentin Tarantino had long been a fan of Liu, and hoped to find him a role in one of his movies. This eventually came to pass with the roles of Johnny Mo and Master Pai Mei in Tarantino's Kill Bill films. His roles in Kill Bill raised Liu's profile again and a renewed interest was shown by Chinese producers; since Kill Bill, Liu has returned to doing movies while continuing to do television for Hong Kong's TVB station.

Other than being a staple in Hong Kong action movies and his foray into Hollywood, Liu also made his Bollywood debut in 2009's Chandni Chowk to China. He played the role of the villain, Hojo, a smuggler and a well-trained martial artist. Before this, he appeared as himself (along with his mentor Lau Kar Leung) in the 2009 film Dragonland, the first Italian documentary about martial cinema history, by Lorenzo De Luca. Liu attended as special guest star at the premiere in Rome, meeting his Italian fans for the first time. During August 2011, Liu had a stroke and put all his plans on hold to recover.

== Personal life ==
Liu has been married twice. He has two daughters, Angie and Bonnie, from his first marriage which ended in 1986, and a son Kris (冼峻龙) and daughter Sonia (冼咏珊) from his second marriage with Ma Fei-feng (马飞凤) of Thai-descent which ended in 2009.

=== Health ===
In August 2011, while in To Kwa Wan performing with his band, Liu had a stroke and hit his head. He had partial right-sided paralysis and a speech impairment as a consequence of the stroke, needing a wheelchair to travel. At the same time, his estranged family from his second marriage had begun pressuring him for money. Depressed at his physical state and family complications, he isolated himself in a nursing home. Liu had cancelled all public engagements as of March 2012. In June 2012, Liu decided to divorce his second wife and focus on his recovery.

During his medical crisis, Liu entrusted his assets to his assistant and spokesperson, Eva Fung. However, the two fell out, and Fung refused to return his assets. Subsequently in 2013, he arranged for Hong Kong actress Amy Fan to become the legal guardian of his assets. Liu later took legal action to recover his assets, and on April 29, 2014, a day before the court date, Fung agreed to return them with interest. In 2015, it was reported that he no longer spoke with a slur but continued to use a wheelchair, and that he had resided at a nursing home for several years.

In 2020, Liu was inducted into the Martial Arts History Museum Hall of Fame.

== Filmography ==
=== Film ===
Year	Title	Role	Notes
1973	Hero of the Waterfront	Extra	
1974	5 Shaolin Masters	Chang Yung	
1974	Shaolin Martial Arts	Ho Chen-kang	
1975	The Four Assassins	Aburiha / Abulahua	
1975	The Monk	Foon Ying's Thug / Monk	
1976	Challenge of the Masters	Wong Fei-hung	
1976	7-Man Army	Mongolian Commander #2	
1976	Boxer Rebellion	Boxer	
1977	He Has Nothing But Kung Fu	Shang Kai-Yuan	Also stunt coordinator
1977	Executioners from Shaolin	Tung Chien-chin	
1978	Breakout from Oppression	Hsiao Tu	Also director and action coordinator
1978	The 36th Chamber of Shaolin	Liu Yu-de / San Te	
1978	Heroes of the East	Ah To	
1978	Shaolin Mantis	Shaolin Fighting Monk	
1979	Fury in the Shaolin Temple		
1979	Dirty Ho	Wang Tsun Hsin (11'th Prince)	
1979	The Shadow Boxing	Chang Chieh	
1980	Clan of the White Lotus	Hong Wen-Ting	
1980	Return to the 36th Chamber	Chao Jen-Cheh	
1980	Fists and Guts	Ah-San / Shaolin Priest	
1980	Shaolin Warrior	Fa Tien	Also producer
1981	My Young Auntie	James	
1981	Elders		
1981	The Shaolin Drunken Monk	Lao Chung	
1981	Treasure Hunters	Monk Mo Seung	
1981	Martial Club	Wong Fei-hung	
1982	Raiders of Shaolin Kung Fu	Ga-wi Yu	
1982	Legendary Weapons of China	Ti Tan	
1982	Godfather of Canton	Lin Si Hai	
1982	The 82 Tenants	Ah Hui	
1982	Cat vs Rat	Emperor Yung Hsi	
1983	Lady Is the Boss	Lee Hon Man	
1983	Shaolin and Wu Tang	Hung Yung-Kit	Also director
1983	Tales of a Eunuch	Emperor Kang Hsi / Siu Yuen Tzu	
1984	The Eight Diagram Pole Fighter	Yang Wu-lang (Fifth Brother)	
1985	Two Jolly Cops	Lo Tak-Fai	Also producer
1985	The Young Vagabond	So Chan	
1985	Disciples of the 36th Chamber	Monk San Te	
1985	Crazy Shaolin Disciples	Monk Wu Ching	
1985	USA Ninja		Action director
1986	The Story of Dr. Sun Yat Sen		
1988	Legend of the Phoenix		
1988	Tiger on the Beat	Fai, The Hitman	
1988	A Bloody Fight	Inspector Lau Fai	
1988	Peacock King	Kubira	
1988	Shaolin vs. Vampire	Hyo Daiyu	Also director
1988	Let's Rage the Gangland		
1989	A Fiery Family	Wei	
1989	Fury of a Tiger	Rambo / Sergeant Mang	Also action choreographer
1989	White Lotus Trio		
1989	My Heart Is That Eternal Rose	Lai Liu	
1989	Ghost Ballroom	Chai	
1989	Killer Angels	Michael	
1990	Tiger on the Beat 2	Lau Fai	
1990	The Fortune Code	Japanese Commander in Blue	
1991	The Killer	Inspector Wong	
1991	Crystal Hunt	Officer Lung	
1991	The Banquet		
1991	A Fate of Love		
1991	The Story of the Gun	Officer Lau Fai	
1992	Passionate Killing in the Dream	Chit-Chit	
1992	Cheetah on Fire	Mainland Gang Leader	
1992	Cry Killer		Martial arts director
1993	Flirting Scholar	Evil Scholar	
1993	Last Hero in China	Master Liu Heung	
1993	Legend of the Liquid Sword	Shaolin Monk	
1993	The Buddhism Palm Strikes Back	For-wan Tse-san	
1993	The Mystery of the Condor Hero	Yuen-tsan	
1993	Bogus Cops	Hood	
1994	The Kung Fu Scholar	His Excellency	
1994	Drunken Master III	Governor Lee (as Kar Fai Lau)	
1994	American Shaolin	Abbot Hung Chi	
1994	If You Were Here	Mr. Chiang	Also stunt coordinator
1994	Funny Shaolin Kids		
1995	Lethal Girls 2		
1997	Super Cops	Uncle Shing	Also action coordinator
1998	Thunder Scout		
1999	The Set Up		
1999	Heaven of Hope	Coffin Leung	
1999	Generation Consultant	Lieutenant Chow	
1999	Generation Pendragon		
1999	Gambler Series: Fraudelent Culture		
2000	The Heaven Sword and Dragon Saber	Sing Kwan	
2000	The Legend of Lady Yang	Chan Yuen-lai	
2000	The Island Tales	Bo	
2002	Drunken Monkey	Detective Hung Yat Fu	
2003	Star Runner	Master Lau (Coach Lau)	
2003	Kill Bill: Volume 1	Johnny Mo	
2004	Kill Bill: Volume 2	Johnny Mo / Pai Mei	
2004	Kill Bill: The Whole Bloody Affair	Johnny Mo / Pai Mei	
2004	Shaolin vs. Evil Dead	Pak / Brother White	
2004	Dragon in Fury		
2004	Snake Curse	Dr. Gao Er	
2005	Dragon Squad	Ko (Police Driver)	
2005	A Chinese Tall Story	Jade Emperor	
2005	Insuperable Kid	Japanese Ambassador	
2005	Dragon Get Angry		
2006	Katana-Man		
2006	Mr. 3 Minutes	Triad Head (Mahjong Debt Collector)	
2006	Hung Kuen vs. Wing Chun	Liu Chiaoxi	
2006	My Kung Fu Sweetheart		
2007	Shaolin Vs. Dead: Ultimate Power	Roam Chow	
2008	Heroes of Shaolin		
2008	Anaconda Frightened	Master Mao Dashi	
2009	Chandni Chowk to China	Hojo	
2009	Frankenstein Unlimited		
2010	Lost in Love	Banker	
2010	Citizen King	Master Cheung	
2010	The Immemorial Magic		
2010	Hot Summer Days	Uncle Fai	
2010	True Legend	Old Sage	
2011	Love in Space	Mr. Chen	
2011	Kill Bill: The Whole Bloody Affair	Johnny Mo / Pai Mei	
2011	Flying Swords of Dragon Gate	Eunuch Wan Yulou	
2012	Nightfall	Retired CID Officer Lung	
2012	The Man with the Iron Fists	The Abbott	
2012	Painted Skin: The Resurrection	Uncle Da	
2012	Blood Money	Shaolin Monk	
2012	Kill 'em All	Snakehead	
2012	No Retreat		
2012	Warrior		
2013	High Kickers	Zhao Yumin	
2014	Future Fighters		

=== Television ===
Year	Title	Chinese title	Role
1990	The Legend of the Invincible	劍魔獨孤求敗	Gong Zan-hung
1991	Mystery of the Twin Swords	日月神劍	Jin Pin-cin
1992	Mystery of the Twin Swords II	捉妖奇兵	Jin Pin-cin
1993	The Mystery of The Condor Hero	射鵰英雄傳之九陰真經	Jyun Zan
1993	The Buddhism Palm Strikes Back	如來神掌再戰江湖	Ngou Cin-saan
1995	The Condor Heroes 95	神鵰俠侶	Kam-lun Fat-wong
1995	Detective Investigation Files II	刑事偵緝檔案II	Cing Gan
1996	Journey to the West	西遊記	Bull Demon King
1997	Bonds of Blood	千秋家国梦	Zhang Baozi / Chen Jiongming
1997	Taming of the Princess	醉打金枝	Lei Gin (Sing Ping's 8th Royal Uncle)
1998	Journey to the West II	西遊記	Bull Demon King, Golden Horned King
1999	Witness to a Prosecution	洗冤錄	Nip Yan-lung
1999	Hero of Shanghai	中華大丈夫	Hoi's Dad
1999	Dragon Love	人龍傳說	Sea Dragon King
2000	The Legendary Four Aces	金裝四大才子	
2000	Legend of Lady Yang	楊貴妃	Chen Xuanli
2001	The Heaven Sword and Dragon Saber	倚天劍屠龍刀	Cheng Kun / Yuan Zhen
2001	A Step into the Past	尋秦記	Cho Chau-dou
2003	The King of Yesterday and Tomorrow	九五至尊	Heung Yeung
2005	Real Kung Fu	佛山贊師父	Lin Yung
2005	The Gateau Affairs	情迷黑森林	Tong Sam
2006	A Pillow Case of Mystery	施公奇案	Sima Jui-fung
2006	Lethal Weapons of Love and Passion	覆雨翻雲	Lai Yue-hoi
2007	Best Bet	迎妻接福	Tsang Dai-lik
2007	On the First Beat	學警出更	Yuen Moon
2007	The Ultimate Crime Fighter	通天幹探	Lai Chun Cheung
2008	The Four	少年四大名捕	Lam Po-Tian
2009	Man in Charge	幕後大老爺	Tai Yau-Kung
2009	Chinese Paladin 3	仙劍奇俠傳三	Evil Sword Immortal
2010	A Pillow Case of Mystery II	施公奇案 II	Si Ma Jeui-fung
2010	Beauty Knows No Pain	女人最痛	Ng Lap-chau
2010	Links to Temptation	誘情轉駁	Lam Chung-pau
2011	Relic of an Emissary	洪武三十二	Yim Chun
2011	Curse of the Royal Harem	萬凰之王	Tunggiya Shumung

=== Documentaries ===
Year	Title	Role	Note
1991	A Fate of Love		Video
1992	Yesterday Once More	Assassin	Video
1994	Cinema of Vengeance	Self	Uncredited
1995	Top Fighter	Self	Video Documentary
2002	The Art of Action: Martial Arts in Motion Picture	Self (Interviewee)	Movie Documentary
2003	Cinema Hong Kong: Wu Xia	Self	Movie Documentary
2003	Chop Socky: Cinema Hong Kong	Self (as Ka Fai Lau)	Movie Documentary
2008	Dragonland	Self	Italian Documentary
2010	Medallion of Kung Fu	Self (Action Director)	Short Video
2011	Tarantino, the Disciple of Hong-Kong	Self	French Documentary
2013	Wu Xia Pian	Self	French Documentary

== See also ==
- List of Shaw Brothers films
- Shaw Brothers Studio
