= Heroes of the East =

1978 Hong Kong film by Lau Kar-leung

- Film poster
- Directed by: Lau Kar Leung
- Written by: Ni Kuang
- Produced by: Mona Fong; Run Run Shaw
- Starring: Gordon Liu; Yuka Mizuno; Yasuaki Kurata
- Cinematography: Arthur Wong
- Edited by: Chiang Hsing-Lung; Li Yen-Hai
- Music by: Chen Yung-Yu
- Distributed by: Shaw Brothers Studio
- Release date: 30 December 1978 (Hong Kong)
- Running time: 100 minutes
- Country: Hong Kong
- Languages: Mandarin; Cantonese; Japanese

Heroes of the East (Chinese: 中華丈夫), also known as Challenge of the Ninja, Shaolin vs. Ninja, and Shaolin Challenges Ninja, is a martial arts film produced in 1978. It starred Gordon Liu and was directed by Lau Kar-Leung. Lau Kar-Leung has a cameo role as So Chan, a master of drunken boxing. The film is notable for portraying Japanese martial arts alongside the more typical kung fu used in most Hong Kong martial arts films.

== Plot ==
In Shanghai about the 1930s, Ho Tao is a kung fu student. His rich father has set up an arranged marriage for him with the daughter of a Japanese business associate. Ho Tao initially objects and feigns illness, but soon thereafter agrees to the marriage when he finds bride to be, Yumiko Kōda ("Kung Zi" in Mandarin), is attractive. After the wedding, he finds out that she is also a martial artist. Ho Tao finds her style of karate to be violent, unladylike, and potentially immodest and tries to persuade her to learn feminine but also effectual styles of Chinese kung fu. She is later offended during an argument over which nation has the superior martial arts styles and eventually goes back to Japan. When he travels to Japan to entreat Kung Zi to be reconciled with her husband, Ho Tao's father finds Kung Zi in training by her childhood friend and rather too attentive martial arts sensei Takeno.

As a ruse to bring her back to China, Ho Tao sends her a letter challenging Japanese martial arts and their inferiority to their Chinese roots. He hopes that the letter will infuriate Kung Zi enough to return to prove that her Japanese styles are as good as the Chinese ones. Once she is back in China, Ho Tao hopes to reconcile with her. But the plan backfires when Takeno reads the letter instead of Kung Zi. Takeno reads the challenge as an affront to Japanese martial arts and declares its contents with other Japanese martial arts masters who travels to China to take up Ho Tao's challenge.

Takeno informs Ho Tao that he will face a different martial arts expert every day.

In the first duel, Ho Tao misinterprets a respectful gesture from the Japanese fighter and thus further antagonizes the Japanese contingent. Due to this cultural misunderstanding, the Japanese no longer treat the subsequent duels as exhibitions of their styles but rather as all-out fights. Kung Zi, seeing the gravity of the situation, helps Ho Tao by warning him of Takeno's mastery of ninjutsu.

A series of duels follows, as Ho Tao comes up with a way to counter each Japanese martial artist’s specialist expertise. In a final showdown, Ho Tao faces Takeno.

Chow Kan, Ho Tao's servant, provides a lot of the comedic relief for the film through various schemes that often bring unintended consequences for Ho Tao.

== Martial arts ==
The film is noted for the exhibitions of various martial-arts styles and weapons:

- Long sword - Japanese Katana vs. Chinese Jian
- Martial arts - Sino-Okinawan Karate vs. Chinese Drunken Fist
- Melee/flailing weapons - Okinawan Nunchaku & Tonfa vs. Chinese Three sectional staff
- Long spear - Japanese Yari vs. Chinese Qiang
- Double weapons - Okinawan Sai vs. Chinese Butterfly Swords
- Martial arts - Japanese Judo vs. peanut oil (a comedic duel)
- Martial arts - Japanese Hensojutsu, Shinobi-iri vs. peanut shells (another comedic duel)
- Throwing weapons - Japanese Shuriken, darts vs. Chinese Needles, Sleeve Arrows
- Chained/roped weapons - Japanese Kusarigama vs. Chinese Rope dart
- Short/broad sword - Japanese Ninjatō vs. Chinese Dao
- Martial arts - Japanese Crab-style vs. Chinese Crane Fist

In a departure from the norm for a Hong Kong film of that time, instead of stereotyping the Japanese characters as villains, the film portrays both the Japanese characters and their fighting skills with respect. Another unusual aspect of the film is that director Lau insisted that none of the fights ended in death. It is consistent with Lau's insistence on no characters being killed when in the film, Ho Tao criticizes the lethal technique of Ninjitsu as being dishonorable. He refers to it as an "ambush" only used by "treacherous criminals", and by contrast "the way of (Chinese) kung fu emphasizes on being fair and open". (All quotes were taken from the subtitle translation used on the Celestial Pictures/IVL DVD release. The English dubbed version, usually titled Shaolin Challenges Ninja, is even more harsh in its assessment of Ninjutsu, with Ho Tao referring to it as "murder" instead of "ambush".)

== Cast ==
- Gordon Liu - Ho Tao, the main protagonist, Yumiko Kōda's husband and Kung fu fighter
- Yuka Mizuno - Yumiko "Kung Zi" Kōda (Japanese: 甲田弓子, Hepburn: Kōda Yumiko), the female protagonist, Ho Tao's Japanese wife from Kyoto, Japan and Japanese martial arts fighter
- Yasuaki Kurata - Sanzou Takeno (Japanese: 武野三蔵, Hepburn: Sanzō Takeno), Japanese ninjutsu expert
- Naozō Katō - Japanese Master
- Riki Harada (English credits say Takeshi Yamamoto) - Japanese Iaido expert
- Yūjirō Sumi (English credits say Tetsu Sumi) - Karate expert
- Hayato Ryūzaki (English credits say Manabu Shirai) - Nunchaku expert
- Yasutaka Nakazaki - Japanese Sai expert
- Hitoshi Ōmae - Japanese judo expert
- Nobuo Yana - Japanese Sōjutsu expert
- Lau Kar-leung - Drunken master So
- Cheng Hong-Yip - Chow Kan
- Ching Miao - Ho Tao's father
- Norman Chui - Chang
- Hoi Sang Lee - Bald pupil
- Yuen Siu Tien - Ho Tao's teacher

== Home media ==
Dragon Dynasty released the DVD in North America on 27 May 2008. Paramount Pictures released the Blu-ray in Japan on 7 June 2013.

== See also ==
- List of Hong Kong films
- List of martial arts films
