= Heroes Two =

1974 Hong Kong film by Chang Cheh

- Film poster
- Directed by: Chang Cheh
- Screenplay by: Chang Cheh; Ni Kuang
- Produced by: Lin Hsing Fan
- Starring: Chen Kuan Tai; Alexander Fu Sheng; Feng Kean; Zhu Mu
- Cinematography: Kung Mu-To
- Edited by: Kwok Ting-Hung
- Music by: Wang Fu-Ling
- Production company: Chang's Film Company
- Release date: 19 January 1974 (Hong Kong)
- Running time: 93 minutes
- Country: Hong Kong
- Languages: Cantonese; Mandarin
- Box office: HK$1.363 million

Heroes Two is a 1973 Hong Kong martial arts film directed by Chang Cheh. The film stars Alexander Fu Sheng and Chen Kuan Tai.

== Plot ==
Heroes Two begins with the burning of the Shaolin Temple, and chronicles the efforts of Fang Shi-yu (Alexander Fu Sheng) and Hung Si-kuan (Chen Kuan Tai) as they combat the forces of oppression, fighting alongside the Chinese revolutionaries. Manchurian General Che Kang (Zhu Mu) is a clever Warlord who capitalizes on the naïveté of Fang Shi-yu. Neither man realizes that they fight for the Shaolin cause, and General Che Kang tricks Fang Shi-yu into believing that Hung Si-kuan is a renegade bandit. With the help of the General's henchmen, Fang Shi-yu defeats a bloodied Hung Si-kuan. Then the tough rebel is put into shackles inside the General's castle. Word quickly spreads that Fang Shi-yu beat the unbeatable Shaolin hero, and the local faction of the rebellion attacks the unknowing Fang Shi-yu for his rash actions. When the rebel leader reveals the true nature of Hung Si-kuan, Fang Shi-yu is beside himself. The naïve martial artist initially intends to correct his mistake by sneaking into the General's dungeon and liberating his cohort from the grasp of the Manchurians. However, General Che Kang himself is a powerful Kung Fu practitioner who foils Fang Shi-yu's plans. Once Fang Shi-yu joins his Rebel brothers, they devise a plan to tunnel into the underground prison and rescue Hung Si-kuan. After several tenuous attempts at freeing him, the Shaolin heroes succeed in their task. Now reunited, Fang Shi-yu, Hung Si-kuan, and their Rebel brothers must endure the assault of General Che Kang and his Manchurian army.

== Release ==
Heroes Two was released in Hong Kong on January 19, 1974. It grossed 1.363 million Hong Kong dollars.

== Reception ==
In a contemporary review, the Monthly Film Bulletin referred to the film as "a classic martial arts fable in which Chang Cheh respects both the historic and the mythic context of the arts themselves" and that the film "may be a lesser work" than Men From the Monastery, but it is "nevertheless one of great visual power and integrity."

From retrospective reviews, Sight & Sound found that the film "offers wall-to-wall kung-fu fighting - though the often routine choreography and monotonous thwack-thwack-thwack of the sound effects make it one for devoted fans only."
