= Mona Fong =

Mona Yat-wah Fong
- 方逸華
- Born: Lee Meng-lan (李夢蘭); 27 July 1934; Shanghai, Republic of China
- Died: 22 November 2017 (aged 83); Hong Kong Sanatorium and Hospital, Happy Valley, Hong Kong
- Occupations: general manager, production manager, film and television producer
- Spouse: Sir Run Run Shaw (m. 1997; died 2014)

Chinese name
- Traditional Chinese: 方逸華
- Simplified Chinese: 方逸华
Transcriptions
Standard Mandarin
- Hanyu Pinyin: Fāng Yìhuá
Yue: Cantonese
- Jyutping: fong1 jat6 waa6
- Musical career
- Also known as: 方夢華

Mona Yat-wah Fong (27 July 1934 – 22 November 2017) was a Hong Kong film and television producer and production manager. She was born Lee Meng-lan in Shanghai.

== Career ==
Fong achieved fame as one of the most popular nightclub singers and recording artists in Singapore and Hong Kong in the 1950s, especially singing English covers of top hits of the time. She married media mogul Sir Run Run Shaw (his second marriage) and became Deputy Chairman and General Manager of Shaw Brothers Studio and Television Broadcasts Limited (TVB).

Fong produced over a hundred films, the final one of which was Drunken Monkey in 2002. Effective 1 January 2009, she was appointed General Manager of TVB. Fong retired from TVB in 2012.

== Death ==
Fong died on 22 November 2017 at Hong Kong Sanatorium and Hospital in Happy Valley, Hong Kong. No cause of death was available.

== Recordings ==
One of her albums, from Hong Kong The Voice of Mona Fong, also referred to as Mona Fong Meets Carding Cruz, featured arrangements by Celso Carrillo and the songs "Karoi Sakurambo", "Millionaire", "Wooden Heart" and "Delilah". It was released on Hong Kong's Diamond Records label. In 1968 an EP Merry Christmas was released on the Pathé label. It also featured Tsin Tsing and Betty Chung. One of her biggest original hits was the title song to the 1966 film, The Blue and the Black (藍與黑).

== Filmography ==
=== Films ===
This is a partial list of films.

- 1957 Mambo Girl - Fong Yat-Wah
- 1967 Sing High, Sing Low
- 1969 Diary of a Lady-Killer - Singer
- 1978 Legend of the Bat - Producer
- 1978 The Cunning Hustler - Producer
- 1978 Godfather's Fury - Producer
- 1982 Cat Vs. Rat - Producer
