= Kuei Chih-Hung =

Chinese film director (1937–1999)

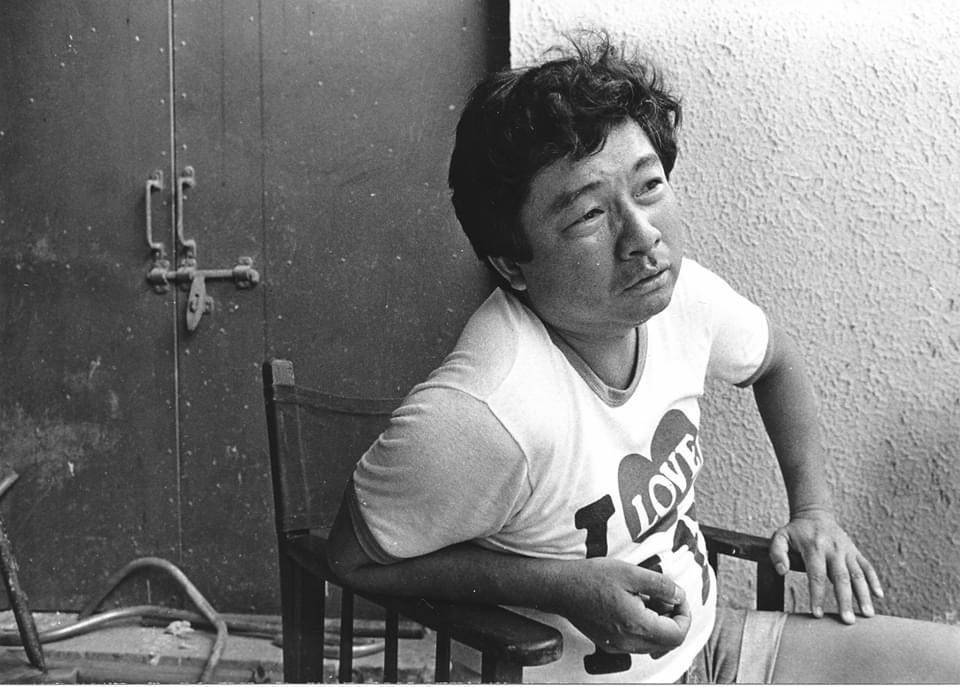
- Kuei on the Hong Kong set of Killer Constable in 1979
- Born: 20 December 1937; Guangzhou, Guangdong Province, China
- Died: 1 October 1999 (aged 61)
- Occupations: Director, screenwriter
- Children: Ming Beaver Kwei

Chinese name
- Traditional Chinese: 桂治洪
Transcriptions
Standard Mandarin
- Hanyu Pinyin: Guì Zhìhóng

Kuei Chih-Hung (Chinese: 桂治洪, a.k.a. Kwei Chi Hung, Gui Zhi-Hong, Gwai Chi-hung) (20 December 1937 – 1 October 1999) was a filmmaker who worked for the Hong Kong–based Shaw Brothers Studio, directing more than 40 films throughout the late 1960s, 1970s and early 1980s. Kuei found critical and commercial success working in a variety of genres, including the hard-boiled crime drama of The Teahouse (1974) and its sequel, Big Brother Cheng (1975), wuxia film Killer Constable (1981), The Killer Snakes (1975) and Hex (1980). Kuei often depicted the poverty of the public housing system, police corruption and colonial government rule.

== Early life ==
Kuei was born in Guangzhou (in the southern Chinese province of Guangdong) on 20 December 1937. Kuei's passion for cinema began as a high school student in Hong Kong, where he would cobble together makeshift shorts from a shoebox projector and discarded film stock. After graduating from high school, he studied stage production and filmmaking at Taiwan's National School of the Arts, experimenting on several 8 mm films. After writing a few film scripts for the Taiwan film industry, Kuei joined the Shaw Brothers Studio in the early 1960s. Initially hired as an assistant director on two Taiwan-shot Shaw films, Lovers' Rock (1964) and Song of Orchid Island (1965), he then lead projects in Hong Kong and an apprenticeship in Japan, where Kuei continued to work.

== Shaw Brothers career ==
At the large Shaw Brothers Studio, Kuei gained a reputation as one of the most promising assistant film directors on numerous Hong Kong productions. In 1970, at the age of 34, he finally got the opportunity to direct a feature, Love Song Over the Sea. Shot in Singapore and Malaysia, the troubled production was initially suspended after the film's star Peter Chen Ho, fell ill. The original director, Shi Mashan, left due to contractual reasons, allowing Kuei to step in. Pleased with his work on this film, the studio quickly gave him a number of directorial projects, including the musical comedy, A Time for Love and The Lady Professional (1971), both starring Lily Ho.

In 1973, he joined forces with the popular Shaw Brothers filmmaker, Chang Cheh, co-directing The Delinquent, an edgy action drama about a young dishwasher who falls into a life of crime. Though a collaboration between the two men, it is Kuei who is credited with the film's distinctive visual style, including the then pioneering use of on-location shoots in Hong Kong's gritty streets and public housing complexes. The film's success led to a string of early '70s hits with Kuei as the sole director, including the women-in prison exploitation flick, The Bamboo House of Dolls and the acclaimed vigilante drama, The Teahouse. He proved a versatile, imaginative filmmaker with a distinctive style that carried through to a number of diverse genres including comedy (The Bod Squad, Rat Catcher) and horror (Ghost Eyes).

The Teahouse, about an immigrant restaurant owner trying to protect his family from juvenile gangs, takes a scathing look at the criminal justice system in Hong Kong and is considered one of Kuei's landmark works. The film is also a strong example of Kuei's penchant for eschewing studio sets for the realistic immediacy of urban locations, vividly depicting the harsh environment of lower-class immigrant life. It was followed by a hit sequel in 1975, Big Brother Cheng, with kung fu star Kuan Tai Chen reprising the eponymous role. Kuei transcended the tired revenge tropes of many action sequels, making Big Brother Cheng a compelling and uncompromising examination of crime, juvenile delinquency and social injustice.

Kuei gained a cult following from The Killer Snakes, a horror movie about a young man who has special powers with venomous snakes, which allow him to take revenge on those who have wronged him. Several over-the-top scenes of S&M sex and lethal snake attacks earned The Killer Snakes its following as a midnight movie classic and to some degree, cemented Kuei's reputation as a maverick filmmaker. The movie is also noteworthy for actor Kam Kwok-Leung's crazily committed performance and the use of hundreds of live poisonous snakes.

Kuei continued to challenge himself by directing segments for The Criminals film series, an acclaimed anthology based on actual Hong Kong cases. His episodes (across four films from 1975 to 1977) included "The Deaf Mute Killer," "The Informer" and "Arson". During the late '70s, Kuei also expanded his filmography to include Cantonese-language comedies (Mr. Funnybone, Crazy Imposters, The Reckless Cricket) and kung fu (The Iron Dragon Strikes Back).

The 1980s saw the versatile Kuei reinventing himself once again, this time with the popular supernatural fantasy, Hex and its two sequels, Hex vs. Witchcraft and Hex After Hex. The latter contained Kuei's signature social satire, taking on such hot-button topics as real estate development and Hong Kong's looming reunification with China. In fact, an early cut of the 1982 film featured a sequence where a character is branded on his behind with "1997" the year mainland China would resume control over Hong Kong. Deemed too politically sensitive, the scene was re-edited and the branded posterior featured "SB" (for Shaw Brothers) instead. Still, Kuei ingeniously found a way to insert a visual gag at the studio's expense.

Kuei also delved into the wuxia genre for the first time with Killer Constable (1980). Though a box-office disappointment at the time of its release, today Killer Constable is considered one of Kuei's finest, most accomplished movies. Reuniting with his Teahouse and Big Brother Cheng star, Kuan Tai Chen, Kuei's kung fu drama is set in ancient Beijing (a rare period piece for the director). Kuan plays a loyal detective investigating a burglary at the royal palace, who slowly realizes that the corruption and betrayal he is assigned to vanquish lies at the highest levels of power. The film was praised for its dark, violent tone, vivid on-location cinematography and genuine pathos.

Kuei's directorial credits during the 1980s also included Corpse Mania, Bewitched and The Boxer's Omen. With the rise of Hong Kong's New Wave filmmakers, a fresh cinematic style was emerging, though Kuei did not get to participate in this movement. He made one last film, the comedy Misfire, in 1984, before immigrating to the United States, where he opened a pizza restaurant. Kuei died of liver cancer in 1999 at the age of 61.

== Legacy ==
Though often overlooked due to his penchant for exploitation genres and his early retirement from the film industry, Kuei Chih-Hung's films have received a renewed appreciation and attention in recent years. Today, he is often fondly referred to as the "Hong Kong Cult Meister." In 2011, the Hong Kong Film Archive published a bilingual edition of Kuei Chih-Hung, the Rebel in the System, a look at his life and films.

That same year, the 35th Hong Kong International Film Festival paid tribute to Kuei with a seven-film retrospective, including screenings of The Teahouse, Killer Constable and the Hex series.

Kuei's son, Ming Beaver Kwei, a film producer whose credits include Sophie's Revenge, My Lucky Star and The Meg was in attendance. The film retrospective allowed the son to view his father's notorious cult classic, The Killer Snakes for the first time, 37 years after its initial release.

"This is a film that's totally psychotic, perverse and grossed out. It's beyond rated R," was how he described it to The Hollywood Reporter in 2011.

Kwei acknowledged that his dad would be pleased the films were still finding an audience, decades later.

"He'd bitch about his work every day, never quite satisfied how his work had turned out, or how it was being distributed. He was only ever happy when he knew for a day that a film had worked at the box office, then he'd start worrying again. He'd be so happy to know that his films were getting a second look today."

Kuei's maverick career was the subject of one of Film Comment writer Grady Hendrix's "Kaiju Shakedown" columns in 2015:

"But while he was regarded as minor league during his time at Shaw Brothers, today he's a giant, standing alongside Chang Cheh and Lau Kar-leung as one of the best directors the studio produced. A pissed off perfectionist with proletarian sensibilities, he directed groundbreaking, realistic crime flicks and some of the filthiest horror movies ever to leave a slime trail across the silver screen. Kuei applied the technical chops of Lau Kar-leung to exploitation material. He had Chang Cheh's obsession with violence, but he was willing to offend his audience in a way that Cheh wasn't."

Kuei's '80s-era horror films have gained a following in the United States in recent years.

The Boxer's Omen, in particular, has a strong American fanbase following a 2006 DVD release and a 2012 screening at the New York Asian Film Festival. Kuei’s horror films were the focus of an extensive article by Simon Abrams in Fangoria magazine.

Abrams describes The Boxer's Omen as "a spectacularly sensory-overloading gross-out, the kind of Stendhal syndrome-inducing gem that spoils you for any further exploration of its creators' prior work."

"You will see things in The Boxer's Omen that you've never seen before," Abrams wrote. "And you'll probably be left wondering 'how the hell was this film made?'."

The New York Asian Film Festival has called Kuei "one of the Shaw Brothers' best and most underrated directors" and screened three of his films — Killer Constable, The Delinquent and Killers on Wheels — in 2014.

== Filmography ==
Year	Film	Notes
1963	The Weird Gentlemen	Director/screenwriter
1964	Lover's Rock	Second assistant director
1965	Song of Orchid Island	Assistant director
1966	Princess Iron Fan	Assistant director
1967	Inter-Pol	Assistant director
1967	Hong Kong Nocturne	Assistant director
1967	King Drummer	Assistant director
1968	Don't Fall for Women	
1968	Hong Kong Rhapsody	Assistant director
1968	Summer Heat	Assistant director
1969	Tropicana Interlude	Assistant director
1970	Love Without End	Assistant director
1970	Whose Baby Is in the Classroom?	Assistant director
1970	The Five Million-Dollar Legacy	Assistant director
1970	Love Song Over the Sea	Co-director/screenwriter
1970	A Time for Love	Also co-writer
1971	The Lady Professional	Co-director
1972	The Gourd Fairy	Also co-writer
1972	Stranger in Hong Kong	Co-director
1972	Intrigue in Nylons	
1973	The Delinquent	Co-director
1973	Payment in Blood	
1973	The Bamboo House of Dolls	
1974	The Killer Snakes	
1974	Virgins of the Seven Seas	
1974	Supermen Against the Orient	Co-director
1974	The Teahouse	
1974	Ghost Eyes	
1974	The Rat Catcher	
1975	Big Brother Cheng	
1975	Fearful Interlude	
1976	Sayang Anakku Sayang	
1976	Spirit of the Raped	
1976	The Criminals 2-Homicides ("The Deaf Mute Killer" & "The Informer")	
1976	Killers on Wheels	
1976	Mr. Funnybone	
1977	The Criminals 3-Arson ("Arson")	
1977	The Criminals 4-Assault ("Maniac")	
1977	The Criminals 5-The Teenager's Nightmare ("The Teenager's Nightmare")	
1978	Crazy Imposters	
1979	The Reckless Cricket	
1979	The Gold Connection (a.k.a. Iron Dragon Strikes Back)	
1980	Killer Constable	
1980	Coward Bastard	
1980	Hex	Also co-writer
1980	Hex vs. Witchcraft	
1980	Corpse Mania	Also co-writer
1980	Bewitched	
1982	Hex After Hex	
1982	Curse of Evil	
1982	Godfather From Canton	
1983	The Boxer's Omen	Also story credit
1984	Misfire	

== Notable quotes ==
"I fell in love with movies in high school and had been itching to make one of my own. But I did not have the money so I made a projector out of a shoe box. I placed a light bulb in it and saved up for film. At the time, movie studios would throw away bits and pieces of used film that did not make the cut. I bought them for my shoe box projector. The film stock back then was nitrate and highly flammable. One time the bulb got overheated and the film started burning. It almost caused a fire and my father gave me a good scolding."

"I am not interested in making fanciful romantic movies at all. I have always wanted to take the realism approach. But in Hong Kong, that is so hard to do. If you make a movie about the mob, you may offend the real mob. If you object to the lenient sentences for juvenile delinquents, you may be condemned as 'agitator'. And if you include provocative dialogues, you may be mistaken as being political."

"A lot of people in Hong Kong tend to indulge themselves in mahjong playing and turn a blind eye to social problems. They think that as long as they do not get mugged themselves, everything is fine. I hope Big Brother Cheng can make them think again."

"In a time when movie-making is considered only an industry, I feel as if I were a factory worker. My job is the director, expected to produce whatever the market demands and I have no right to question that."

"The audience is hard to please. Their tastes tend to be low. The more vulgar the movie, the more likely you will make money. If you try to do something different or try to say something true to your beliefs, you might end up with a disastrous flop. To please the audience, you must resort to gimmicks. I make fantasy movies because audiences like them. But I'm not cavalier making them. I devoted a lot of thought on photography, lighting and so on."

"Compared to smaller studios, there are advantages and disadvantages to working for Shaw Brothers. Perhaps things have improved now, but in the past, independent productions were always running out of funds and that affected both the quality of the movie and your own livelihood. Shaw Brothers is at least well-equipped. If you need a set for a period movie, for example, just take a look in the sculpture room of the studio and you will find Shanghainese masters who specialize in making antique furniture. It is also true that New Wave directors have raised the standard. Now I can ask my crew, 'How do we compete with them when we are complacent?'"
