= Killer Constable =

1980 Hong Kong film by Chih-Hung Kwei

- Theatrical release poster
- Traditional Chinese: 萬人斬
- Simplified Chinese: 万人斩
- Literal meaning: Beheader of ten thousand persons
- Hanyu Pinyin: Wàn Rén Zhǎn
- Directed by: Chih-Hung Kwei
- Screenplay by: Szeto On; Chang Cheh
- Produced by: Mona Fong; Run Run Shaw; Po-Nan Wen
- Starring: Chen Kuan-tai; Ku Feng
- Cinematography: Lee San-Yip
- Edited by: Shao-Hsi Chang; Hsing-Lung Chiang
- Music by: Eddie Wang
- Distributed by: Shaw Brothers (Hong Kong); W.W. Entertainment (U.S.); Celestial Pictures
- Release date: March 28, 1980 (Hong Kong); 1984 (U.S.)
- Running time: 92 minutes 100 minutes
- Country: Hong Kong
- Language: Mandarin
- Box office: HK$984,108.50

Killer Constable (Chinese: 萬人斬; aka Karate Exterminators, Lightning Kung Fu, Blood Brothers, or Karate Warrior) is a 1980 Hong Kong martial arts-action film directed by Chih-Hung Kwei, starring martial arts star Chen Kuan-tai. The movie was produced by the Shaw Brothers studio and is a loose reworking of the 1969 movie The Invincible Fist by the film director Chang Cheh, a frequent collaborator of Chih-Hung Kwei.

Killer Constable began a transition from the earlier Shaw Brothers studio films to the more cynical film noir approach of the later Hong Kong New Wave. It was Chih-Hung Kwei's one and only period wuxia film.

== Plot ==
At a lavish banquet, the Manchurian Empress Dowager Cixi of the 19th century Qing empire orders security chief of the Forbidden City Liu Jing Tian to capture the five thieves that stole 2 million taels from the Royal Treasury. Lord Liu, in turn, asks chief court constable Leng Tian-Ying, nicknamed Killer Constable, to assemble a small group of his best men to find the thieves, dead or alive, and return the gold treasure within ten days. Leng accepts, but soon finds that his own brother Cun Yi, also law enforcement officer, refuses to join him, because he is fed up with Leng's merciless attitude and execution-style justice.

The first lead towards catching the thieves brings the constables to a watermill. There Leng tortures and ultimately kills the miller in front of his family, but he only recovers a small part of the gold treasure. Continuing on their quest, Leng and his men are ambushed by two bandits at night in an abandoned temple. One constable, Peng Lai, who wandered off to feed the starving Han Chinese villagers, is ambushed and staked alive. It falls to Leng to execute his companion and end his suffering. Then Leng hunts down the two bandits to the seaside where they are, once again, ambushed. Soon thereafter, they also discover a highly skilled assassin, Fan Jin-Peng, whom the bandits want to hire to assassinate Leng. Leng ultimately defeats the assassin, but gets injured and loses the older constable, Ma Zhong.

Later, the constables are attacked by gang leader Fang Feng-Jia and the remaining bandits. Thanks to the unexpected return of Leng's brother, Leng survives and is carried unconsciously on horseback to the residence of Fang. There he is welcomed by the bandit's blind daughter, Xiao Lan, who tends to his wounds. Later when Fang returns, the two men hide their conflict for Xiao Lan and pretend to be friends.

After leaving Fang's home, Fang is wounded by Leng, but he still manages to escape to his hideout. When Leng finds Fang, they are both attacked by a mysterious group of armed men that do not appear to belong to the group of robbers. Fang, dying from the wounds inflicted by Leng, reveals it was Lord Liu that had sent his troops after them and that he in fact arranged for the gold to be stolen. He choose Leng to hunt down the robbers, knowing he would not spare their lives, and in this way hide all evidence. Fang then offers to sacrifice his life in order to let the constable escape. However, this is on the condition that Leng promises to take care of his blind daughter.

Leng survives the attack and soon discovers his brother was killed by Lord Liu's troops. A grief-stricken and betrayed Leng seeks vengeance. He succeeds in murdering Lord Liu, but not before he activates a trap mechanism that kills Leng. We are left with the daughter of gang leader Fang waiting in vain for either her father, or Leng, to return.

== Cast ==
=== Law enforcement and state officials ===
- Chen Kuan-tai, as Leng Tian-Ying, the killer constable and main protagonist tasked with finding the treasure and the thieves
- Cho Tat-wah, as Lord Liu Jing Tian, the security chief who orders Leng to find the thieves
- Ai Fei, as Peng Lai, one of the constables selected for the mission by Leng. He shows compassion with the impoverished commoners, but is the first constable to die by being staked alive.
- Chiang Tao, as Zhao Jian, one of the constables selected for the mission by Leng
- Dick Wei, as Sun Heng, one of the constables selected for the mission by Leng. He dies at the seaside battle.
- Gam Biu, as Ma Zhong, an older constable who volunteers to join, later killed by assassin Fan Jin-Peng
- Gam Sai-Yuk, as Cui Hin, a constable who is about to get married and delivers the first lead. He dies during the final ambush in the abandoned village.
- Keung Hon, as Lord Wang
- Bai Jing-Xue, as Cun Yi, constable and brother of Leng
- Yuen Wah, as Ba Jia, Liu's bodyguard

=== The outlaws ===
- Ku Feng, as Fang Feng-Jia, leader of the gang of bandits
- Yau Chui-Ling, as Xiao Lan, the blind daughter of the gang leader Fang Feng-Jia
- Leung Seung-Wan, as Ah Niu, miller and the first of the bandits to be caught and murdered
- Teresa Ha Ping, as Ah Niu's wife
- Lee Chun-Wa, as Tao Bau, the blacksmith bandit
- Kwan Yung-Moon, as Zhang Long, a cunning member of the gang of thieves, dies at the seaside battle
- San Kuai, as gang member Wang Wan-Wu, who uses his cut of the treasure to hire assassin Fan Jin-Peng, but is betrayed and killed by him
- Jason Pai Piao, as Fan Jin-Peng, a highly skilled assassin

== Themes ==
=== Social Inequality ===
An underlying theme in Killer Constable is the oppression of the poor and famished Han Chinese by the corrupt and greedy Manchu ruling class (which include the protagonist). Film historian David Bordwell points out that the cruelty of class warfare is, as also in many of Kuei's previous works, an important theme in Killer Constable and quotes director Kuei : “I simply wanted to depict how insignificant commoners are and how, under totalitarian rule, they turn out to be the victims”. Similarly, movie critic John White of the Digital Fix highlights the "dramatic message of a political class which uses the security force/police as its tool for keeping the people oppressed and itself enriched".

=== Justice ===
In the 1970s, crime-centered themes gained traction in Hong Kong cinema and, as in the case of Killer Constable, spread into the Kung Fu genre. Researcher Benjamin Freudenberg argues that the figure of the Killer Constable represents "the traditional Confucian fear of mechanic enforcement of the legal text". Film writer Hayley Scanlon similarly states that "Killer Constable is a critique of blind justice... " and that "the only good and true thing in the cruel wold of Killer Constable is the blind daughter of one of the criminals". In one instance constable Ling and gang leader Fang go as far as pretending to be old friends in order to prevent her from finding out the truth, a scene that may have inspired a similar event in The Killer by John Woo.

== Production ==
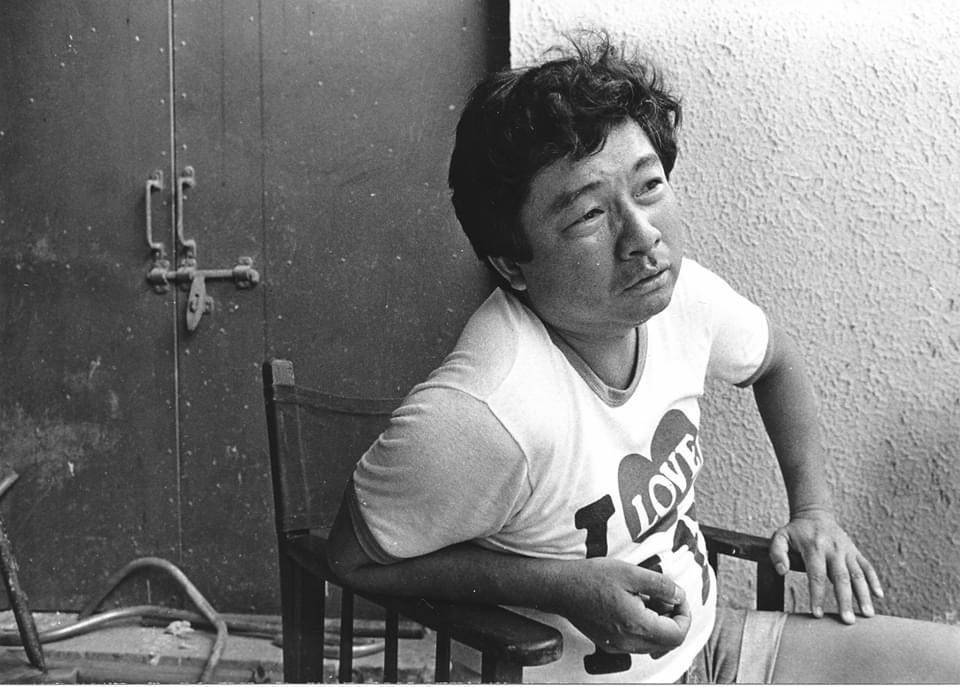
Chih-Hung Kwei on set shooting Killer Constable (16 August 1979).

Killer Constable was produced by the Shaw Brothers using a Hong Kong-Korea co-production construct. Filming occurred in Hong Kong and South Korea and included a Korean assistant director Kim Seon-Gyeong. Several Korean actors picked up minor rolls, such as Kwan Yung-Moon. An altered version of Killer Constable, 노명검 (The No-myung Sword), was made for the Korean market, with different scenes, extended runtime and altered plot.

For the main character of the Killer Constable director Chih-Hung Kwei has explained that he was influenced by Doctor Zhivago: "I love Dr. Zhivago. In Killer Constable, I want to create a character like Zhivago. Despite his position in the high court, the protagonist is a righteous man. Yet in the corruption and poverty-stricken era at the end of the Qing dynasty, there is not much good he can do on his own. Hence he is deluded by society and lives his life foolishly. "

Lead actor Chen Kuan-tai had previously left Shaw Brothers in a contract dispute, but was available as he re-joined Shaw Brothers in 1978. He had starred as the lead in earlier successful movies directed by Chih-Hung Kwei, such as The Teahouse (1974) and Big Brother Cheng (1975), that also share the same screenwriter Szeto On.

The movie marks the start of the long-time collaboration of Chih-Hung Kwei with cinematographer Lee San-Yip, who would film nearly all of his following movies such as the Hex series and The Boxer's Omen. During shooting, director Kuei Chih-Hung aimed for a large degree of realism. In a 2002 interview, Chen Kuan-tai has stated that "We were using real weapons" in Killer Constable and that a fellow actor chopped off his right-hand pinky finger when shooting a fight scene. Actor Austin Wai was originally panned to star in Killer Constable, but had to leave due to a severe back injury.

== Release ==
US poster for the release of Killer Constable as Karate Exterminators in 1984

Killer Constable ran in Hong Kong theaters from 28 March 1980 to 3 April 1980. At the 5th edition of the Hong Kong International Film Festival, it was selected as one of eight feature films of the Hong Kong '81 section and was also part of the special retrospective on A study of the Hong Kong swordplay film.

The Korean version of Killer Constable, The No-myung Sword, opened in cinemas on 20 March 1981.

Killer Constable was also theatrically released in West Germany under the title Der gnadenlose Vollstrecker in 1981.

The US theatrical release occurred four years after the release in Hong Kong, under the title Karate Exterminators, in November 1984 by distributor World-Northal Corporation (World Wide Entertainment), who also managed the US television broadcast rights.

== Reception ==
Killer Constable has been lauded as Chih-Hung Kwei's masterpiece and one of the best movies to emerge from the Shaw Brothers studio. Author Stephen Teo labels it as "... one of the best Shaw Brothers wuxia films of the eighties..." in this book 'Chinese Martial Arts Cinema – The Wuxia Tradition' and movie critic John White of the Digital Fix argues 'This is one of the best films Shaw Brothers ever made'. The Hong Kong Film Critics Society included Killer Constable in their list of "The Best 200 Chinese-language Films".

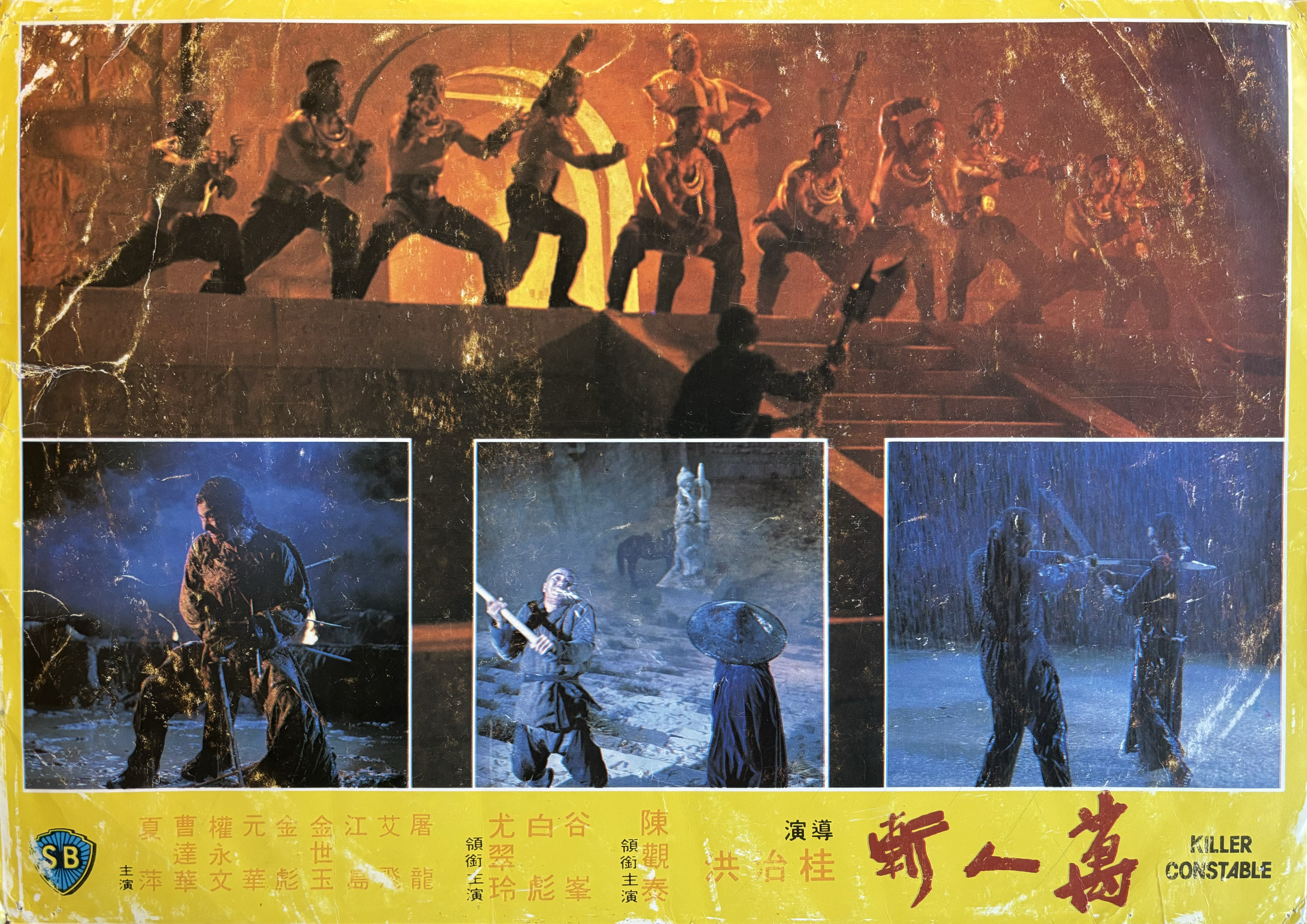
Promotional movie still with bottom row insets illustrating the distinctive nighttime sword-action scenes and a background image of a scene not included in the Hong Kong-released version of Killer Constable.

Contemporary reviews, such as those in the popular Hong Kong movie magazine City Entertainment, praise the carefully crafted atmosphere through set photography and martial arts arrangements.

In a modern review, Matthew Le-feuvre of cityonfire.com gives the film a 9/10 rating and finds that "the real beauty is within the film’s iconography". Similarly, Grady Hendrix notes that the cinematography of Lee San-Yip shows a "style that found its strength in his harshly geometric compositions, stylized lighting, and Lee’s uncanny ability to shoot coherent action in near-total darkness." A less favorable view was given by 135 readers of LoveHKFilm.com who voted 'Killer Constable' to place 100 in a Top 100 Hong Kong Films of the Eighties. More critical reviews argue the movie has an uneven quality, in particular finding the fight choreography lacking. However, film critic David Chute praises the sword battle scenes in the 1993 issue of Asian Trash Cinema.

== Box office ==
Killer Constable was no box office success and grossed HK$984,108.50 (approximately 176 000 US$) at the Hong Kong box office, becoming the 74th-highest grossing Chinese film of the year 1980. In South Korea, 28 548 tickets were sold in Seoul, grossing approximately ₩57,096,000 (about US$83,230).

== Home media ==
=== VHS ===
In the US market, home video releases of Killer Constable emerged that were not sanctioned by the Shaw Brothers, some appearing under the title Lightning Kung Fu.

GoldStar Home Video released a Korean version of Killer Constable in 1986.

=== DVD ===
Release date	Country	Classification	Publisher	Format	Region	Language	Sound	Subtitles	Notes	Ref.
07 June 2007	Hong Kong		Intercontinental Video (IVL Hong Kong)	NTSC	3	Mandarin	Dolby Digital	English, Chinese		
	China		tung ah entertainment	NTSC	1	English	Dolby Digital 2.0	None		
			Pegasus/ Kung Fu Legends						Release under the title Blood brothers	
			Bci/Eclipse						Release under the title Lightning Kung Fu	

=== Blu-ray ===
Release date	Country	Classification	Publisher	Format	Region	Language	Sound	Subtitles	Notes	Ref.
27 March 2017	United Kingdom	BBFC: 15	88 Films	PAL	B	Mandarin, English	LPCM 2.0	English	Dual release: includes DVD	
07 December 2015	Germany		filmArt		B	Mandarin, German	DTS-HD Master Audio Mono	German	Release under the title Der gnadenlose Vollstrecker, dual release: includes DVD	
