= Old Master Q =

Hong Kong manhua created by Alfonso Wong

- Cover of Old Master Q vol. 44, art by Alfonso Wong. featuring the titular Old Master Q, Big Potato and Mr. Chin

老夫子 lou5 fu1 zi2
- Genre: Gag-a-day, satire
- Author: Alfonso Wong (1964–1995); Joseph Wong (1995–present)
- Publisher: WangZ Inc.
- Demographic: Various
- Original run: 1962 – present

Old Master Q (Chinese: 老夫子; Jyutping: lou5 fu1 zi2; pinyin: Lǎo fūzǐ; lit. 'Old Master'; Wong's romanization: Lo Fu Gee; also known as Mr. Funnybone from the movie of the same name) is a Hong Kong manhua created by Alfonso Wong. The cartoon first appeared in the newspapers and magazines in Hong Kong on 3 February 1962, and later serialised in 1964. The comic is still in publication today, and is the oldest Asian comic series in publication.

The comic is copyrighted by WangZ Inc, a company established by Joseph Wong Chak (Alfonso Wong's eldest son) in Taipei, Taiwan. Joseph Wong still continues to create new volumes and has taken over the story or volume creations since 1995.

== Name ==
Alfonso Wong explained that 老; Lǎo; lou5 ("Lo") means "old", 夫子; fūzi; fu1 zi2 is "a rather ordinary, but respectable title" over two-thousand-year old which denotes a "learned one" "who can become a teacher ('Fu Gee') or, or one who has studied a lot"; the English title "Old Master Q" "sort of" translates the Chinese title, with Q being abbreviated from earlier "Cute". Wong additionally noted the similarity between his main character's English title "Old Master Q" and the name Ah Q of Lu Xun's character, whom Wong considered to be "rather humourous [sic] and satirical".

== Characters ==
The series' cast is led by the titular Old Master Q (老夫子; lou5 fu1 zi2; Lǎo fūzi), an elderly, lanky man dressed in a distinctively antiquated Qing dynasty-era outfit. The character is a satirical depiction of conservative Asians with his gullibility, hubris, stubborn nature and lack of critical thinking, struggling to survive in a capitalistic landscape and gradually evolving society.

Kelvin Chan of the South China Morning Post described Q as "eccentric".

Supporting characters include:

- Big Potato (大番薯; daai6 faan1 syu2; Dà Fānshǔ), Old Master Q's short best friend and sidekick who wears an equally archaic outfit.
- Mr. Chin (秦先生; Ceon4 sin1 saang1; Qín xiānshēng), a bookish 'ordinary Joe' character who is good friends with Old Master Q and Potato despite his younger age.
- Miss Chan (陳小姐; 陈小姐; Can4 siu2 ze2; Chén xiǎojiě), Old Master Q's love interest. A narcissistic gold digger who frequently ditches Old Master Q for his antiquated nature, but nevertheless remains a close friend of his.
- Mr. Chiu (老趙; 老赵; Lou5 Ziu6; Lǎo Zhào), Old Master Q's rival. A rich and petty individual whose actions and somewhat antagonistic relationship with Old Master Q vary between chapters.

== Format and themes ==
The series' format involve Old Master Q and his friends as they navigate life in a modern Hong Kong, with Mr. Chiu or a third party often serving as antagonists. The comics are known for its wry sense of humour lending itself from a degree of unpredictability. While usually down-to-earth, the series does not shy from increasingly surreal scenarios such as aspects of horror and science fiction. Long-format comics have been produced revolving around lengthier adventures of the main cast pitted against gangsters in modern Hong Kong or warriors in a wuxia setting.

While Old Master Q comics primarily focus on humour, they also reflect changing social trends; particularly from the 1960s to the 1980s. The comics would sometimes feature societal problems in urban life, such as poverty, petty thefts and secret societies. It also poked fun at fashion, contemporary art and rock music. The comic strips sometimes also bemoan the decline of ethical or moral values in modern-day living. Characters often display acts of selfishness or misery; although the comics occasionally display good values like filial piety. The language barrier between the Chinese language and the English language is also depicted in some comic strips; illustrated with Old Master Q's difficulty communicating with foreigners, especially Westerners.

The comics have, on some occasions, expressed complexity in the plots and serious views on major political changes taking place in Hong Kong during the 1960s-1980s. It had previously criticised overly Westernised Chinese, who were often shown in the comic strips kowtowing to Western interests over the local Chinese interests. The run-up to the handover of Hong Kong to China following the Sino-British Joint Declaration of 1984 also became a point of interest, as a few comic strips were published through the late 1980s and early 1990s expressing the characters' fears of handover, frequently represented in a numeral of the year it would take place: 1997. Some of these comic strips also depict direct assault of representations of the Chinese government and the Chinese Communist Party, occasionally in the form of caricatured depictions of Deng Xiaoping. The handover was later depicted in more a positive light in the years leading to the actual event; possibly representing a changing perspective from the author.

== Films ==
The comic series was made into many Cantonese and Mandarin cartoon animations, one of which combined live actors and advanced CGI graphics.

The list of Old Master Q films is as follows, in chronological order:

English name	Chinese name	Release date	Type	Casts
Old Master Q	老夫子	3 August 1965	film	Ko Lo-chuen (高魯泉)
Old Master Q and Big Potato	老夫子與大蕃薯	19 May 1966	film	Suet Nay (雪妮), Ko Lo-chuen (高魯泉), Lydia Shum (沈殿霞)
How Master Cute Thrice Saved the Idiot Ming	老夫子三救傻瓜明	13 July 1966	film	Ko Lo-chuen (高魯泉)
Old Master Q	老夫子	8 March 1975	film	Leung Tin (梁天), Betty Ting, Roy Chiao, Sai Gwa-pau (西瓜刨), Law Lan, Lai Siu Fong
Mr. Funnybone	我係老夫子	2 October 1976	film	Lee Ching (李菁), Wang Sha (王沙); Ngai Tung Gwa (矮冬瓜), Lau Luk-wah (劉陸華)
Mr. Funnybone Strikes Again	老夫子奇趣錄	18 November 1978		
Colour Old Master Q	七彩老夫子	16 July 1980	cartoon	
Old Master Q Water Margin	老夫子水虎傳	10 July 1982	cartoon	
Old Master Q & "San-T"	山T老夫子	4 August 1983	cartoon	
Old Master Q 2001	老夫子2001	5 April 2001	film	Nicholas Tse, Cecilia Cheung, Alfonso Wong
Master Q: Incredible Pet Detective	老夫子反斗偵探	20 December 2003	cartoon	Eric Tsang, Chapman To, Andes Yue, Lee Ka-yee (利嘉兒), Dexter Young (楊天經)
Old Master Q – Fantasy Zone Battle	老夫子 – 魔界夢戰記	2003	TV series	
Master Q	老夫子	2004	TV series	
The New Unbeatable Old Master Q: Shaolin Detective Agency	無敵老夫子新傳：少林偵探社	2005	film	Law Kar-ying, Karen Tong (湯寳如)
Old Master Q and Little Ocean Tiger	老夫子之小水虎传奇	2011	film	Deng Chao, Zhang Hanyu, Elva Hsiao

- Other actors in OMQ movies include: Hong Wei (紅薇), Connie Chan, Nancy Sit, Chu Yau-ko (朱由高), Fen Ni (芬妮)
- Other lyricists/singers include: Wong Jim, Joseph Koo, Leslie Cheung

== Spin-off ==
A spin-off series called Q Master Q (Q夫子) shows young versions of the characters with similar clothing as their adult counterparts. Each of their names also are related to their counterparts.

== Plagiarism dispute ==
Alfonso Wong was criticized for plagiarizing the work of Tianjin-based manhua artist Peng Di (朋弟), which featured a similar character of the same name and produced for newspapers during Wong's childhood in the 1930s; Peng's work fell into obscurity due to his silencing during the Cultural Revolution, only to be rediscovered as Old Master Q started to be syndicated in Mainland China afterwards. Feng Jicai published a book in 2001 containing samples of work by Peng Di, which displayed the similarities between Peng Di and Alfonso Wong's works, including one strip which was copied near-verbatim. Wong acknowledged Peng Di's existence when interviewed, but never responded to the accusations. However, in a 1974 article, Wong noted that a separate series, a comic strip from Shanghai named Mr. Wang, which also featured a similar protagonist but predates Peng Di's work, served as the primary inspiration for the character. Similar characters have existed throughout comics in Mainland China prior to the Chinese Communist Party coming into power, but did not feature Wong's refined art style and wry humour.
