= Changrui =

Changrui (Chinese: 长锐) is a given name of Chinese origin. It may refer to:

- Xue Changrui (born 1991), Chinese pole vaulter
- Huang Changrui, Chinese swimmer and 2006 Asian Swimming Championships medalist
- Changrui, male lead character in 2009 film Sophie's Revenge
- Changrui Mountain, landform near the Eastern Qing Tombs
