= Ming Beaver Kwei =

American film producer

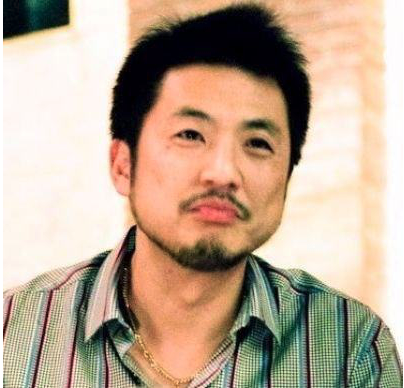
- Ming Beaver Kwei at a Sophie's Revenge press event in 2009
- Born: YauMing Kwei; November 12, 1966 (age 59); Hong Kong
- Occupation: Film producer
- Years active: 2000-present

Ming Beaver Kwei (Chinese: 桂幼铭; born November 12, 1966) is an American film producer based in Los Angeles and China. He is the son of famed Shaw Brothers Studio director Kuei Chih-Hung (桂治洪) (Killer Constable, Hex). Kwei has produced two hit comedies starring Zhang Ziyi, Sophie's Revenge and its follow-up, My Lucky Star (Fei chang xing yun), as well as the films Moscow Mission, I Remember, The Precipice Game, Legend of Sun and Moon and Unspoken.

Kwei was an associate producer on The Meg, a 2018 shark thriller starring Jason Statham and Li Bingbing that grossed more than $530 million worldwide and coproduced its 2023 sequel, Meg 2: The Trench, which tallied $395 million at the worldwide box office. His other film credits include The Adventurers (executive producer), Slam (associate producer) and The Painted Veil (associate producer).

== Early life ==
Born Yau Ming Kwei in Hong Kong, Beaver grew up on the Shaw Brothers backlot with his filmmaking family, where his father directed 75 films and his mother worked as a Foley artist.

“I was used to coconut shells, buckets of gravel and doors that led nowhere on a sound stage. My math tutor was the projectionist", Kwei told The Hollywood Reporter in 2011.

He lived in studio-subsidized housing with his family, and counted Hong Kong filmmakers Chang Cheh (co-director on Kuei's The Delinquent), Ching Gang, father of Tony Ching Siu-Tung (A Chinese Ghost Story) and Derek Yee Tung-sing (Protege) as neighbors.

“Shaw kept everybody in their little kingdom. Directors in one block and stars in the next building.”

After relocating to the United States with his family in the 1980s, Kwei attended St. Michael's Preparatory School, a Catholic boys boarding school in southern Orange County, California. His father discouraged him from pursuing a career in the film industry, preferring that Kwei become an engineer instead. Nevertheless, Kwei was accepted into the film program at the University of California, Irvine.

“I always knew I’d be in films. But I also knew I didn’t want to be a director,” he told The Hollywood Reporter.

== Career ==
Kwei began his Hollywood career as a personal assistant to Jet Li on such popular movies as Hero, Romeo Must Die and Kiss of the Dragon. Li recalled on the press circuit how Kwei’s input became instrumental in developing the climactic fight scene in 2001’s Kiss of the Dragon:

“We had scheduled six days to film the final fight scene. After the third day, back at the hotel, Beaver suddenly told me why he thought the scene didn’t work. He and I started to argue, and the argument lasted several hours. Later that night, I lay awake in bed, quietly rethinking the entire scene and his objections. I didn’t agree with all of them, but I spent that night re-imagining a fight scene that could solve all of those problems. The next morning, when I arrived on the set, people were in the middle of shooting the original scene. I said to them, 'Stop filming. Let’s scrap it. We have something new.' I think the final cut really shows the results of the pressure we put on ourselves to produce an interesting film,” Li said.

Over the course of five years, eight films and one video game production, Kwei built a fruitful working relationship with Li and even did some action unit stunt directing on Kiss of the Dragon.

“[It] made me very glad to have an assistant like Beaver,” Li said in 2001, expressing that he felt lucky “to have an assistant, whom I also consider a friend, who will very frankly present his opinion of how my fans will react to certain scenes. Beaver speaks for that audience. After twenty years, one can get too familiar with one’s own work, and that’s when you need new ideas and perspectives. Don’t get me wrong, he and I get into big fights, but I really do value his creative input. We may not agree 100%, but we may ultimately end up changing 30-40% of the scene, and the result is worth it.”

From 2005 to 2008, he was the Executive VP of production and development for Warner China Film HG and was the associate producer of the Edward Norton-Naomi Watts film, The Painted Veil, shot on location in Beijing, Shanghai and Guangxi, China, and Slam, a youth basketball drama. Kwei’s first film as a producer was the 2009 comedy, Sophie's Revenge, starring Zhang Ziyi and directed by Eva Jin Yimeng. Sophie’s Revenge was a big hit in China, earning more than 100 million RMB ($15.2 million). Kwei reteamed with Zhang and Ling Lucas to co-produce a successful follow-up, the 2013 prequel My Lucky Star. With Zhang reprising the role of Sophie and co-starring pop star Leehom Wang, My Lucky Star was an even bigger hit, garnering an international release and earning more than $22 million worldwide.

Kwei had brought My Lucky Star to Village Roadshow Entertainment Group Asia. My Lucky Star is notable for being the first Chinese-language movie to be directed by an American woman, Dennie Gordon. Kwei’s cross-cultural sensibilities came into play, working with Gordon and writer Amy Snow to develop a vehicle for Zhang that would be in the tradition of Hollywood rom-coms, yet specifically tailored for a Chinese audience.

Gordon recalled getting the balance just right to The Los Angeles Times in 2013:

“I pitched [to Zhang] -- what if we took you to the land of James Bond or Romancing the Stone, a spy-tastic adventure where Sophie has to step up to the plate? And she loved that. So I came back here and started working with a couple writers. … The two that I most closely developed it with here were Beaver Kwei, one of my producers, and Amy Snow.”

For his contributions to the plot line of My Lucky Star, Kwei earned a story credit on the film as well.

Kwei followed up these romantic comedies with a decidedly different genre in 2015. The Precipice Game is a low-budget horror movie starring Ruby Lin (Sophie’s Revenge, My Lucky Star) and Peter Ho and directed by Wang Zao. Kwei produced for Shanghai-based Fundamental Films. Kwei earned an executive producer credit on 2017’s The Adventurers, a big-budget action thriller starring Andy Lau, Qi Shu and Jean Reno. The Adventurers has grossed more than $36 million worldwide.

August 2018 marked the release of one of Kwei’s biggest film productions to date. The Meg, a thriller about a megalodon prehistoric shark discovered by scientists in the Marianas Trench, boasted a big budget ($130–178 million) and an international cast that included Jason Statham, Li Bingbing, Rainn Wilson, Ruby Rose, Winston Chao and Cliff Curtis. A U.S./China co-production from Warner Bros. Entertainment, Gravity Pictures and Flagship Entertainment, the film was shot in New Zealand and China, with Kwei serving as an associate producer. The Meg was a megahit, grossing $145.4 million in North America and $384.8 million internationally for a worldwide box-office of tally of $530.2 million. Kwei returned to coproduce the sequel in 2023.

In 2020, Kwei produced the romantic drama, I Remember directed by Nan Zhou and starring Angelababy, Hong-Chi Lee and Denny Huang. 2023 saw the global release of Meg 2: The Trench, reuniting Statham and Curtis with actors Page Kennedy, and Shuya Sophia Cai from the original blockbuster. Meg 2 was directed by Ben Wheatley, with Kwei returning as a coproducer. It received generally negative reviews from critics, but was popular with audiences earning $395 million worldwide.

In addition to Statham, Kwei also reunited with another international action star—Andy Lau, whom he had previously worked with on The Adventurers—as producer of the 2023 action thriller Moscow Mission. The movie follows a group of police detectives led by Zhang Hanyu (The Taking of Tiger Mountain), on a task force to find out who is robbing trans-Siberian railways from Beijing to Moscow. The story is based on a series of real-life armed robberies that took place on the China Railway K3/4 in 1993. Moscow Mission was also selected as the closing film at the 9th annual Asian World Film Festival in Culver City, California. Kwei has described Moscow Mission as "a film marked by both historical authenticity and strong entertainment value — showcasing a spectacular heist in a tumultuous time and locale with old school action sequences and imaginative story-telling that celebrates and pays homage to action movies past and present, from China and the world."

Kwei, in association with CMC Pictures and Huanxi Media, is producing Unspoken, a suspense drama starring Moscow Mission's Hanyu, Michael Cudlitz (The Walking Dead), Jake Abel (Malignant) and Vivienne Tien (Be Yourself). The Chinese-Canadian film, directed by Daming Chen, follows a former cop (Zhang) seeking justice after his deaf daughter is murdered at an American university. The film won the inaugural China Movie & TV Night Award for Anticipated Film of the Year at the 25th Shanghai International Film Festival and is scheduled for release in China in 2024. Unspoken is also being shopped at the American Film Market (AFM) for international sales.

The fantasy film, Legend of Sun and Moon is currently in post-production and marks Kwei’s second film with Sophie’s Revenge director Eva Jin Yimeng. It is based on the Chinese mythology of moon goddess Chang'e and her archer husband, Houyi.

In addition to these film credits, Kwei has collaborated with his friend, the Chinese director Ning Hao on four projects: Crazy Stone, Crazy Racer, No Man's Land and Crazy Alien.

== Personal life ==
Kwei is an avid long-distance runner. He ran and completed the Sapporo Hokkaido Marathon in 2014, and in 2015.

== Filmography ==
Producer
2006	The Painted Veil	associate producer (China)
2006	Crazy Stone	production executive
2008	Slam	associate producer
2008	Connected	production executive
2009	Sophie’s Revenge	producer
2013	My Lucky Star	producer (also story credit)
2016	The Precipice Game	producer
2016	Mission Milano	administrative producer
2016	Super Express	production executive
2017	The Adventurers	executive producer
2018	The Meg	associate producer
2020	Legend of Sun and Moon	producer (currently in post-production)
2020	I Remember	producer
2023	Meg 2: The Trench	coproducer
2023	Moscow Mission	producer
2024	Unspoken	producer

Writer
2006	Crazy Stone	story consultant
2013	My Lucky Star	story (also producer credit)
2013	No Man’s Land	story consultant
2019	Crazy Alien	story consultant

Stunts
2001	Kiss of the Dragon	stunt direction/stunt team: Corey Yuen Stunt Team

Miscellaneous Crew
2000	Romeo Must Die	personal assistant to Jet Li (uncredited))
2001	Kiss of the Dragon	personal assistant to Jet Li
2001	The One	personal assistant to Jet Li
2002	Invincible	personal assistant (TV movie, uncredited)
2009	Hero	personal assistant to Jet Li
2003	Cradle 2 the Grave	personal assistant to Jet Li
2003	Rise to Honor	personal assistant to Jet Li (video game)
2005	Unleashed	personal assistant to Jet Li
2009	Silver Medalist (aka Crazy Racer)	development executive
2017	Crazy Alien	story editor

Special Thanks
2011	Inseparable
2015	All Eyes and Ears (documentary)
