= Mr. Funnybone =

1976 Hong Kong film by Kuei Chih-Hung

- Film poster
- Traditional Chinese: 老夫子
- Simplified Chinese: 老夫子
- Hanyu Pinyin: Lǎo Fū Zi
- Jyutping: Lou2 Fu1 Zi2
- Directed by: Kuei Chih-Hung
- Screenplay by: Alfonso Wong; Sze-to On
- Based on: Old Master Q by Alfonso Wong
- Produced by: Run Run Shaw; Alfonso Wong
- Starring: Wang Sha; Liu Lu-hua; Ai Tung-kwa; Lee Ching
- Cinematography: Yau Kei
- Edited by: Henry Cheung; Chang Hsing-lung
- Music by: Frankie Chan
- Production company: Shaw Brothers Studio
- Distributed by: Shaw Brothers Studio
- Release date: 2 October 1976 (Hong Kong)
- Running time: 80 minutes
- Country: Hong Kong
- Language: Cantonese

Mr. Funnybone is a 1976 Hong Kong comedy film directed by Kuei Chih-Hung based on the manhua, Old Master Q, by Alfonso Wong, who also co-wrote the script and serves as the film's co-producer, and starring Wang Sha as the titular protagonist. The film was followed by a sequel, Mr. Funnybone Strikes Again, released in 1978.

== Cast ==
- Wang Sa as Mr. Funnybone / Old Master Q
- Liu Lu-hua as Mr. Chun
- Ai Tung-kwa as Big Potato
- Lee Ching as Miss Chan
- Chong Lee as Ms. Lam
- Ng Tin as Manager Chiu
- Jia Ling as Mrs. Chiu
- Norman Chu as Funnybone's colleague
- Leung Seung-wan as Funnybone's colleague
- Ngai Fei as Funnybone's colleague
- Lee Yuen-wah as Funnybone's colleague
- Lau Wai-ming as Funnybone's colleague
- Sharon Yeung as Lady exercising in the park
- Kong Yeung as Escaped convict
- Mak Wa-mei as Potato's girlfriend
- Lee Chung-ling
- Au Ka-lai
- Ching Si
- Wong Ching-ching
- Cheng Chok-chow as Funnybone's colleague
- Liu Wai as Mr Hiroshi
- Lui Hung as Mrs. Xing
- Tino Wong as Molester in the park
- Fung Ming as Man reading newspaper in the park
- Tsui On-sam as Funnybone's fat cousin
- Man Man as Restaurant customer
- Chiu Chun-chiu as Restaurant waiter
- Kam Tin-chue as Manager Chiu's friend
- Koo Chim-hung as Manager Chiu's friend
- Hung Ling-ling as Manager Chiu's girlfriend
- Cheung Sek-au as Alighting bus passenger
- Ting Tung as Wedding guest
