= Iron Monkey (1977 film) =

1977 Hong Kong-Taiwanese film by Chen Kuan-tai

- Film poster
- Directed by: Chen Kuan-tai
- Written by: Ni Kuang
- Produced by: Lin Wong-Feng
- Starring: Chen Kuan-tai
- Cinematography: Chen Ching-Chu
- Edited by: Kuo Ting-Hung
- Music by: Frankie Chan
- Production companies: Chin Hua Film Company; Wung Tai
- Distributed by: Shaw Brothers Studio; Unifilm International Company (USA)
- Release date: 18 November 1977
- Running time: 95 minutes
- Countries: Hong Kong; Taiwan
- Languages: Cantonese; Mandarin

Iron Monkey (Chinese: Tie hou zi, also known as Bloody Monkey Master in North America) is a 1977 martial arts film directed by, and starring Chen Kuan Tai, as a Shaolin Temple trained Monkey Kung Fu expert, fighting against the Qings. The film is a Hong Kong–Taiwanese co-production.

== Plot ==
Kam Kong plays an evil Manchurian General, who desires to crush the revolutionaries who have ties to the Shaolin temple. Chen Kuan-tai is Iron, a naive young man who is unaware that his father is a leader of this underground movement. An undercover operative named Ho Yeng, who conned his way into joining the rebellion, betrays Iron's father. The entire family is captured (except for Iron) and the General schedules their executions the following day. Since the leader of the rebellion is now in his clutches, the General focuses on the capture of his enemy's son, Iron. A witness to this heinous act warns Iron and he manages to escape the village and avoid capture from the Qing army. He becomes a wild, animalistic wanderer who survives by stealing food from a nearby Shaolin temple. He also watches the hopefuls who train in the martial arts there. A group of students eventually catch him breaking into the temple, and they comment on his monkey-like agility. One student (Chi Kuan-chun) follows him into the woods and suggests that Iron become a student of the Shaolin Temple. The Abbot is more than happy to accept him as a pupil, but he notices the look of anger in the young man's eyes. Iron refuses to comment on his agenda or his identity, so the Abbott assigns him a new identity—that of Iron Monkey.

Iron Monkey soon proves himself a natural in the temple training arena. In a short time, he becomes a top student, at the expense of his peers’ friendship (as they are naturally jealous). Soon, the head monks inform the students that they must select a specialized martial arts technique. Naturally, Iron Monkey selects the fearsome Monkey Fist method, which is unrivaled in the martial arts world, except for Eagle's Claw style. The Abbot sends Iron Monkey out into the wilderness where he is trained by the exiled Bitter Monk. In a year's time, Iron Monkey masters the Monkey Fist and returns to the temple with confidence and ability. The Abbott welcomes him back, but senses that Iron Monkey is still motivated by hatred and rage. The Abbot tells him that he must alleviate his inner pain, and return to the temple a wiser man cleansed of hatred. The timing is perfect as the General's guard intrude upon the Shaolin temple to recruit martial artists to the Qing cause. But the students and monks are loyal to their beliefs, and no one sells out—except for Iron Monkey. Like the hated betrayer of his father, Ho Yeng, Iron Monkey plans to join the Manchus and destroy their organization from within. His ultimate goal is to get close to the General, so he can assassinate the man responsible for the death of his family. But first he must prove himself.

The General doesn't trust Iron Monkey and assigns him the task of hunting and killing suspected revolutionaries. Iron Monkey immerses himself in Manchu propaganda and begins beating and killing his own people! But, the Captains and the General take notice of his skills and behavior, and he is given a promotion. The Manchus still don't trust him and orders him to kill more radicals. The more people Iron Monkey kills, the higher he rises in the Qing hierarchy. Eventually he becomes equal in rank to the Captains that recruited him. But he has still not achieved his goal of meeting the General. When the Manchus order Iron Monkey to crush the Shaolin Temple itself, he realizes he must finally make his move. He confronts the entire chain of the Manchu hierarchy, starting with the traitor Ho Yeng, to the Captains, and finally the General himself. However, the General did not earn his position for nothing. He is a master of the Eagle's Claw—the only form of martial arts that can overcome the Monkey Fist.

== Cast ==
- Chen Kuan-tai – Iron Monkey
- Chi Kuan-chun - Fung Kong
- Bryan Leung – Captain Ti
- Kam Kong – General
- Wilson Tong – Ho Yin

== Home media ==
The film was retitled as School of Shaolin for the American DVD release.

Aside from starring Shaw Brothers actor Chen Kuan Tai this film was produced independently for the Ching Hua film company. Thus it is not among the titles that are remastered by Celestial Pictures. As of Jun. 2010 there are few known DVD releases, and all of them are in a desolate state and none features the original dialogue:

- UK: DVD by Vengeance Video, running time 91 min. 14 sec.
- US: DVD by Xenon Pictures, running time 91 min. 7 sec.
- Germany: DVD by Madison Home Video, 75 min. 49 sec.

Whether the US or UK DVDs are the original theatrical version is unknown. The US release runs with PAL speed up and is identical to the UK in content. The German release is edited to gain a "Not Under 16" rating. The film received an "Not Under 18" rating for an earlier VHS release, which was significantly longer than 75 min. 49 sec.

The picture shows significant amount of dirt and the colors have shifted severely. Also the aspect ratio is not correct and the image appears more or less stretched. This is common among all three DVDs, which suggests that they were taken from the same source. This is important as the UK DVD features a deleted scene which is in a much better condition. It has nearly no dirt, no color shift and it features the original dialogue with English subtitles.
