= Youth of China =

Youth of China can refer to:

- Youth of China (EP), a 2008 EP by Li Yuchun
- Youth of China (film), a 1937 patriotic Hong Kong film
- Youth of China (1940 film), with Bai Yang
- Wah Ching, a Chinese American criminal organization founded in San Francisco, California

== See also ==
- Communist Youth League of China
- Young Pioneers of China
