= Return to Action =

1990 Hong Kong film by Chen Kuan-tai

- VCD cover
- Traditional Chinese: 喋血風雲
- Simplified Chinese: 喋血风云
- Hanyu Pinyin: Dié Xuè Fēng Yún
- Jyutping: Dip6 Hyut3 Fung1 Wan4
- Directed by: Chen Kuan-tai
- Screenplay by: Kirk Wong; Cheung Ming-wai
- Produced by: Chen Kaun-tai; David Lo
- Starring: Alex Man; Rosamund Kwan; Mark Cheng; Shing Fui-On; Chen Kuan-tai
- Cinematography: Cheung Tik-kei
- Edited by: Robert Choi
- Music by: Keith Chan; Michael Lai; Tang Siu-lam
- Production companies: J&J Film
- Distributed by: Newport Entertainment
- Release date: 29 March 1990
- Running time: 94 minutes
- Country: Hong Kong
- Language: Cantonese
- Box office: HK$2,340,415

Return to Action is a 1990 Hong Kong action film produced and directed by Chen Kuan-tai and starring Alex Man, Rosamund Kwan, Mark Cheng, Shing Fui-On and Chen himself in a supporting role.

== Plot ==
Chan Wan-sing (Chen Kuan-tai) has retired from the underworld for many years and often inculcates his son Wah (Mark Cheng), hoping that his son will not step into his footsteps. However, Wah had secretly colluded with Mad Man (Shing Fui-On) in dealing with illegal business. While on the other hand, Chan greatly cares for his adopted daughter Joey (Rosamund Kwan) as if she was his biological child and is also very proud of Joey's husband, police inspector Man Yung-keung (Alex Man) of the Regional Unit of Hong Kong.

Man's superiors assign him to assist Interpol officer Ms. Hon (Lee Siu-man), who has come to Hong Kong to investigate smuggling case, and ensure her safety. However, Ms. Hon disapproves of the Hong Kong Police and starts the operation by herself, where she was captured and murdered by Wah.

When Joey brings her students to visit her brother's shipyard, she notices a female corpse in photo that was taken during the visit. When she questions Wah about the corpse, he denies it and destroys the photo. To repay Chan's favor of raising her, Joey did not bring this matter up with Man. However, this decision has led her to a fatal disaster when Wah brings Mad Man to ask her for the negative of the photo. When she refused, Wah accidentally kills her. After Joey died, the negative had unexpectedly fallen into the hands of Man. In order to avenge Joey, Man teams up with Chan to find Wah and Mad Man. During an intense battle, Chan punishes his own relations in the cause of justice, and shoots his son dead in order to save Man.

== Cast ==
- Alex Man as Man Yung-keung
- Rosamund Kwan as Joey Chan
- Mark Cheng as Wah
- Shing Fui-On as Mad Man
- Chen Kuan-tai as Chan Wan-sing
- Lee Yiu-man as Ms. Hon
- Eliza Yue
- Kenneth Tsang as Officer Ng
- Cheng Kang-yeh as Suspect in police station
- Yue Tau-wan as Cross-eyed cop
- Dion Lam as On
- Tai Po as Man's informer (cameo)
- Lo Lieh as Prisoner (cameo)
- Wilson Tong as Prisoner (cameo)
- Wong Chi-wai as Mad Man's bodyguard
- Yat Poon-chai as Rocky
- Chan Chik-wai as Yip
- Thomas Sin as Prisoner
- Mai Kei as Suspect in police station
- Chow Mei-fung
- Sin Kwai-chi
- Gabriel Wong as Joey's student
- Yu Mo-lin as Mother scolding her kid
- Leung Wing-yim
- Chang Sing-kwong as Bodyguard
- Chung Wing as Prisoner
- Chow Chi-hung as Bodyguard
- Lee Yiu-king as Guard
- Lau Shung-fung
- Lung Ying
- Fei Pak
- Ling Chi-hung

== Reception ==
=== Critical ===
So Good Reviews gave the film a mixed review and writes "Standard and rather cheaply made, Chen Kuan-tai nonetheless delivers the beats of the narrative fairly well."

=== Box office ===
The film grossed HK$2,340,415 at the Hong Kong box office during its theatrical run from 29 March to 4 April 1990 in Hong Kong.
