= Chan Sau Chung =

Hong Kong kung fu practitioner (1934–2020)

Chan Sau Chung 陳秀中, The Monkey King (May 6, 1934 in Hong Kong – February 7, 2020) was the Head of the Tai Shing Pek Kwar Kung Fu. He was the protégé and sole successor of Gan Dak Hoi, of Tai Shing Pek Kwar Kung Fu. His notable students include movie actor/martial artist Chen Kuan-tai (Chan Koon Tai), who is famous for wuxia and martial arts movies made by the Shaw Brothers.

== Early training ==
Chan Sau Chung became a student of Gan Dak Hoi 耿德海 (Geng De Hai) when he was roughly 12 years old and has been practising ever since. Initially he was taught sanshou by Gan, however over time Gan began to teach him Da Sheng Pi Gua. Gan Dak Hoi had learned Pi Gua kung fu from his father, Master Gan Wing 耿榮貴. Gan Dak Hoi later invited Chan to study kung fu everyday and to help manage his school in Hong Kong. At the age of 16 years Chan quit his regular school and became a full-time teaching assistant to Gan Dak Hoi at the Hong Kong school.

Chan Sau Chung also learned Da Sheng Pi Gua from Gan Dak Hoi, who in turn had learned it from its founder Kau Sei (Kou Si) 寇四. Having learned the entire Pi Gua system, Gan Dak Hoi then taught his young protégé all five styles of Da Sheng Kung Fu. As Chan's knowledge and expertise in Da Sheng Pi Gua grew Gan Dak Hoi would take him into the mountains outside of Hong Kong for special training in Da Sheng kung fu. This included walking tightropes, scrambling up ropes, rolling around on rocky ground and walking around in a slightly bow legged monkey styled squat until his legs burned. However, not all training included physical exercise as once or twice each week Chan would go to the Kam Shan Country Park (金山郊野公園) just outside Hong Kong to watch the monkeys play, fight, frolic and generally be themselves. He gradually incorporated their gestures, eye movements, facial expressions and their short sharp burst of speed in his kung fu routines.

== Opening of first school ==
Chan Sau Chung and three of his batch mates Lam Sy Fun, Hiu Hoi and Chow Sing Fun were selected by Gan Dak Hoi and authorised to teach Da Sheng Pi Gua. In 1954, at the age of 22, Chan Sau Chung opened his first school in Hong Kong. It had only eleven students nonetheless, Chan Sau Chung was determined to continue teaching kung fu, things remained very slow and low-keyed until the late sixties when monkey kung fu burst onto the international scene.

== Trainer of champions ==
In 1969, Chan's student Chan Koon Tai won five straight matches to claim the middleweight title in the Southeast Asia Open Martial Arts Tournament. Chan Koon Tai would soon become a successful movie actor. For the next three years Chan sent a fighter who won his weight class. After having trained four South-east Asian champions, Chan Sau Chung retired. Over the years Chan Sau Chung has trained many students.

== Hong Kong Kung Fu Association ==
Chan Sau Chung established the Hong Kong Kung Fu Association Ltd. in 1977 to better organise the kungfu community in Hong Kong. He was elected as the Chairman in 1978. Under his supervision, the Association gave many charity shows and all receipts from sales tickets were donated to charity institutions. The most significant one was the "Saving Child Sponsoring Schooling" campaign organized by the Hong Kong Wah Kiu Yat Poa. The Malaysian Government sent a Senior Governor to Hong Kong to invite him to give performance charity shows in Malaysia in 1978. He led a group of over 30 people and gave shows in 5 cities in Malaysia. Chan was also the chairman and consultant of the other major kungfu associations in Hong Kong, and he was the Permanent Honorary President & Vice Chairman of the Hong Kong Chinese Martial Arts Association.

== Da Sheng Pi Gua International Kung Fu Federation ==
Chan Sau Chung formally launched the Da Sheng Pi Gua International Kung Fu Federation in Hong Kong on December 7, 2000. It sought to lend organisation and structure on a worldwide basis, to the teaching of genuine Da Sheng Pi Gua Kung Fu together with this, the official Federation website was also launched.

The Federation's website offered site visitors a view into the origin, development and evolution of Da Sheng Pi Gua Kung Fu as well the option to learn Da Sheng Pi Gua Kung Fu by taking video courses. These courses were offered at four levels as follows:

- Beginner
- Intermediate
- Advanced and
- Masters.

Each level had its own costs and students would be provided with video taped lessons containing the curriculum for that level which included stances, strikes and various forms and were allowed to train at their own pace and at the point where they felt comfortable they were required to make video recording of themselves doing the forms and send these to the Federation for grading and assessment. At the Beginners level the stances and strikes were very basic and the forms were really an introduction to Pi Gua Kung Fu. As each student progressed, the material provided got more advanced and there was a gradual introduction to Da Sheng Kung Fu. It was mandatory that each student go through the natural progression of successfully completing each level, be assessed and if successful, permission would be granted to advance to the next higher level. No skipping of levels was allowed whatsoever.

It was at the Advanced level that the student began learning advanced Monkey Forms. The length of time required to complete each level depended on each student, whether they were practising kung fu prior to commencing the program, how often they trained and how committed they were to the program. The Beginners level was expected to take anywhere from six to eighteen months, Intermediate was expected to last between twelve and thirty months, Advanced was expected to last between eighteen and forty months while at the Masters level the student would be required to train in Vancouver under direct supervision from Master Chan Kai Leung and Grandmaster Chan Sau Chung.

The Master's level period of training could take upward of five years prior to successful completion. It is important to again note that no skipping of levels was allowed so no student could enter the program at the Master's level. Bear in mind also that there are five variations taught by the Federation (lost monkey, stone monkey, wooden monkey, tall monkey and the drunken monkey) and that there are upwards of one hundred and twenty-six weapon and empty hand forms. At various levels, approved students were permitted to participate in tournaments as members of the Da Sheng Pi Gua International Kung Fu Federation. Upon successful completion of the Master's level training, students would be graded and where appropriate certified by Grandmaster Chan Sau Chung to open their own Da Sheng Pi Gua Kung Fu schools.

Together with the video taped lessons, Intermediate level students were initially provided with a book written jointly by Chan Sau Chung and his son Chan Kai Leung, entitled "Essence Of The Monkey". This book gave very detailed insights into the development of Da Sheng Pi Gua Kung Fu and provided information obtained directly from Gan Dak Hoi himself etc. It also provided information on ALL students who were trained by Gan Dak Hoi and which ones were certified to teach Da Sheng Pi Gua Kung Fu. The Federation continues to update this family tree with the modern day students who have mastered all five variations but only those from the lineage previously certified by Gan Dak Hoi.

For reasons related to the preservation of information, the Federation came to the conclusion that it had to take down the website and make the "E essence Of The Monkey" book available to its Advanced and Masters students only.

== Sources ==
1. Chris Miller. "The Real Iron Monkey". Vancouver Courier. Archived from the original on 2006-10-17.
2. Chan Kai Leung (2001). "Monkey King Chan Sau Chung's Journey to the West". Kungfu Magazine.
3. Chan Kai Leung (2001). "Da Sheng Pi Gua International Kung Fu Federation Launched". Kungfu Magazine.
