= The Savage Five =

1974 Hong Kong film by Chang Cheh

- Film poster
- Traditional Chinese: 五虎將
- Simplified Chinese: 五虎将
- Hanyu Pinyin: Wǔ Hǔ Jiàng
- Jyutping: Ng2 Fu2 Zeong3
- Directed by: Chang Cheh
- Screenplay by: Ni Kuang; Chang Cheh
- Produced by: Run Run Shaw
- Starring: David Chiang; Ti Lung; Chen Kuan-tai; Danny Lee; Wong Chung
- Cinematography: Kung Mu-to
- Edited by: Kwok Ting-hung
- Music by: Frankie Chan
- Production company: Shaw Brothers Studio
- Distributed by: Shaw Brothers Studio
- Release date: 15 February 1974
- Running time: 91 minutes
- Country: Hong Kong
- Language: Mandarin

The Savage Five, also known as The Savage 5, is a 1974 Hong Kong martial arts film. Written and directed by Chang Cheh, it stars David Chiang, Ti Lung, Chen Kuan-tai, Danny Lee and Wong Chung. The film's Chinese title literally means the "Five Tiger Generals". Godfrey Ho was assistant director in this movie (as Chih Chiang Ho).

== Plot ==
A group of bandits flees with a stolen safe to a small town where they oppress the villagers and forces the town's blacksmith Wei Min-hui (Danny Lee) to unlock the safe. Wei refuses to help the bandits and after he informed the mayor about this, he reports to the officials in a nearby village. The bandits were furious that Wei has fled away and starts killing the villagers, threatening them that they will kill a villager every hour if they do not find Wei. Finally, the heroes of the town come forward to wipe out the bandits. At this time, Wei also brings a government official to town, who unexpectedly turns out to be an accomplice of the bandits.

== Cast ==
- David Chiang as Chen Deng / Chen San
- Ti Lung as Fang Yi-fei
- Chen Kuan-tai as Ma Dao
- Danny Lee as Wei Min-hui
- Wong Chung as Yao Guang
- Wai Wang as Brother Li
- Wong Ching as Bandit leader
- Chinag Tao as Liang Shan
- Wong Bing-bing as San Niang
- Lo Dik as Mayor Yuen
- Wang Kuang-yu as Bandit
- Norman Chui as Dai Niu
- Ngai Fei as villager
- Lee Sau-kei as villager
- Lee Pang-fei as villager
- Shum Lo as villager
- Wong Ching-ho as villager
- Liu Wai as villager
- Lam Fai-wong as villager
- Jamie Luk as villager
- Stephen Yip as villager
- Lee Yung-kit as villager
- Yuen Man-tzu as village girl
- Kot Dik-wah as village girl
- Johnson Wong as Bandit
- Wong Shu-tong as Bandit
- Yen Shi-kwan as Bandit
- Chan Dik-hak as Bandit
- Lau Chun-fai as Bandit
- Ng Yuen-fan as Bandit
- Tung Choi Bo as Bandit
- Law Keung as Bandit
- Danny Chow as Bandit
- Wong Mei as Bandit
- Tang Tak-cheung as Bandit
- Chik Nga-hung as Bandit
- Huang Ha as Bandit
- Chui Fat as Bandit
- Cheung Siu-lun as Villager
- Wa Lun as Young villager
- Ting Tung as Villager
- Ho Bo-sing
- Chan Siu-gai
- Choi Lam
- Tam Ying
- Yuen Shun-yi
- Fung Hak-on
- Hsu Hsia
- Yeung Pak-chan
- Wong Chi-keung
- Kong Chuen
- Ho Kei-cheung
- Ho Hon-chau as Villager
- Ling Hon
- Wong Kung-miu
