= A Time for Love (film) =

1970 Hong Kong film by Kuei Chih-Hung

- Film poster
- Directed by: Kuei Chih-Hung
- Written by: Lap Chui; Kuei Chih-Hung
- Produced by: Runme Shaw
- Starring: Cheng Kwan-Min; Lily Ho; Shirley Huang; Lee Kwan; Ai Lien Pan; Dean Shek; Wu Wei
- Cinematography: Nishimoto Tadashi
- Edited by: Chiang Hsing-Lung
- Music by: Chou Fu-Liang
- Distributed by: Shaw Brothers
- Release date: 16 October 1970
- Running time: 95 minutes
- Country: Hong Kong
- Language: Mandarin

A Time for Love (pinyin: Na ge bu duo qing) is a 1970 Hong Kong Shaw Brothers comedy film directed by Kuei Chih-Hung.

== Cast ==
- Cheng Kwan-Min
- Lily Ho
- Shirley Huang
- Lee Kwan
- Ai Lien Pan
- Dean Shek as Chau Ping
- Wu Wei
