= Cold Blade =

1970 Hong Kong film by Chor Yuen

- Film poster
- Directed by: Chor Yuen
- Written by: Chor Yuen
- Produced by: Choo Kok Leong
- Starring: Melinda Chen Man-Ling; Kao Yuen; Ingrid Hu Yin-Yin; Cheung Ban; Paul Chu Kong
- Cinematography: Lee Man Kit
- Edited by: Wang Zhao-Xi
- Distributed by: Cathay Studios
- Release date: 30 December 1970 (Hong Kong)
- Running time: 86 minutes
- Country: Hong Kong
- Language: Mandarin

Cold Blade or Yu nu qin qing is a 1970 Hong Kong action Mandarin martial arts film directed by Chor Yuen. This is Chor Yuen's first film in Mandarin.

== Film Restored ==
The original film was lost. With a copy from Marie-Claire Quiquemelle, a film collector in France, the film was restored.

== Cast ==
- Melinda Chen Man-Ling
- Kao Yuen
- Ingrid Hu Yin-Yin
- Cheung Ban
- Paul Chu Kong
- Tsung Yu
- Kong San
- Li Ying
- Lau Kong
- Lee Man-Tai
- Kuan-tai Chen
- Tung Choi-Bo
- Chow Siu-Loi
- Yeung Wai
- Wong Kin-Wah
- Cheng Mei-Mei
- Lau Wai-Man

Note: The list of names may have surname followed by first name.
