= Wang Chengbin (general, born 1874) =

Chinese general (1874–1936)

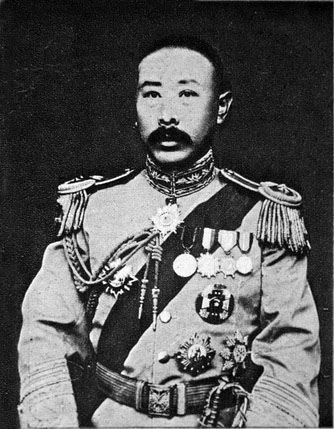
- Native name: 王承斌
- Born: August 21, 1874; Fengtian Province, (modern Liaoning Province), (Qing dynasty) Qing Empire
- Died: February 15, 1936 Beiping, Republic of China
- Allegiance: Qing dynasty (Republic of China (1912–1949)) Republic of China; Beiyang clique Zhili clique
- Branch: New Army; Beiyang Army
- Service years: 1909-1924
- Conflicts: Xinhai Revolution; Second Revolution; National Protection War; Zhili–Anhui War; First Zhili–Fengtian War; Second Zhili–Fengtian War
- Awards: Order of Rank and Merit; Order of the Precious Brilliant Golden Grain; Order of Wen-Hu
- Children: Alfonso Wong

Wang Chengbin
- Chinese: 王承斌
Transcriptions
Standard Mandarin
- Hanyu Pinyin: Wáng Chéngbīn
- Wade–Giles: Wang2 Ch'eng2-pin1

Wang Chengbin (Chinese: 王承斌) (August 21, 1874 – February 15, 1936) was an ethnic Manchu Chinese general of the Warlord Era of the Republic of China. He was the father of Hong Kong cartoonist Alfonso Wong. Born in Fengtian (now Liaoning) Province, Wang attended Baoding Military Academy from 1907 to 1909, and shortly thereafter joined the New Army and was stationed in Changchun, Jilin Province. In October 1911, after the outbreak of the Wuchang Uprising, he was sent to Shanxi Province to suppress supporters of the Xinhai Revolution. In August 1912, he was appointed commander of the 11th Regiment, part of the 6th Brigade, 3rd Division. In the fall of 1913, he went with the 3rd Division to Yuezhou (now Yueyang in Hunan) to suppress the Second Revolution. In 1915, he went with the 3rd Division to Sichuan Province to suppress opposition to the Empire of China. In July 1917, he acted with Wu Peifu to overthrow Zhang Xun's Manchu Restoration.

By March 1924 he was civil governor at Tianjin. He died in 1936.
