= The Master (1980 film) =

1980 Hong Kong film by Lu Chin Ku

- Directed by: Lu Chin Ku
- Written by: Kuang Ni
- Starring: Chen Kuan-tai, Yuen Tak, Wang Lung-wei
- Production company: Shaw Brothers Studio
- Release date: May 23, 1980
- Country: Hong Kong
- Language: Cantonese

The Master (known previously in the United States as 3 Evil Masters) is a 1980 martial arts film produced in Hong Kong. It was directed by Lu Chin Ku and produced by the Shaw Brothers Studio. While The Master was Lu's attempt at kung fu comedy similar to Jackie Chan movies of the time, he continued on to create films with a more fantastical flair.

In the story, the three antagonists, each with a certain fight gimmick, defeat Jin Tuan-Yun and take over his kung fu academy. A young student, Gao Jian, nurses Jin back to health, and in return is taught a variety of secret martial art techniques in order to win back the school.

== Cast ==
- Chen Kuan Tai – Jin Tien-yun
- Chiang Lin – Student
- Wang Lung-wei – Yan Qing-wang
- Eddy Ko – Ko Han
- Lau Hok Nin – Shi Chen-chung
- Yuen Tak – Gao Jian
- Chan Lau – 2nd brother
- Ai Fei – 1st brother
- Wen Hsueh Erh – Shi's daughter

== Legacy ==
Underground rapper Afu-Ra, who regularly references kung fu pop culture in his music, has a song called "3 Evil Masters".

== See also ==
- Cinema of Hong Kong
