= Chen Kuan-tai =

Hong Kong martial arts actor (1945–2026)

- 陳觀泰
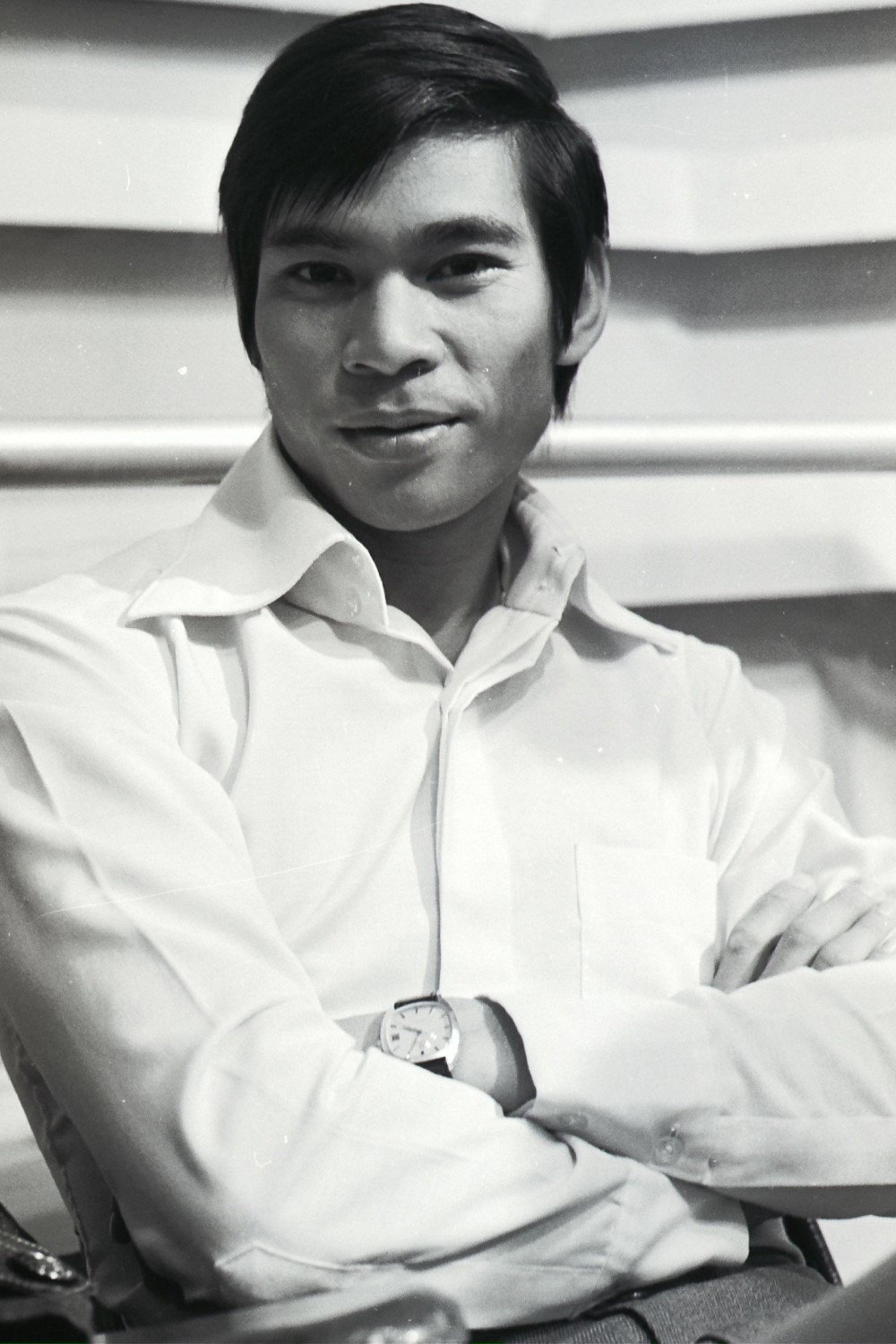
- Chen in the 1970s
- Born: 24 September 1945; Guangdong, China
- Died: 2 September 2026 (aged 80); Zhongshan, Guangdong, China
- Other names: Chan Goon-Tai; Chen Kwan-Tai; Chan Koon-Tai; Chan Kuan-Tai; Chen Kung-Tai; Chen Guan-Tay; Chen Guan-Tai; Chan Kun-Tai; Ah Tai
- Occupations: Actor, director, action director
- Years active: 1969–2026
- Spouses: Ying Ying (m. 1976; div. 1977) Fong Yee-chun (m. 1977, divorced) Zhao Ting-ting (m. 1990, divorced) Tang Liping (m. 2017)
- Children: 2
- Awards: Asia-Pacific Film Festival; 1974 Most Popular Male Actor

Chinese name
- Traditional Chinese: 陳觀泰
- Simplified Chinese: 陈观泰
Transcriptions
Standard Mandarin
- Hanyu Pinyin: Chén Guāntài

Chen Kuan-tai (Chinese: 陳觀泰; 24 September 1945 – 2 September 2026) was a Hong Kong martial arts actor, director and action choreographer. He rose to fame in the early 1970s for his films with the Shaw Brothers Studio and is credited as being one of the film company's first professionally trained martial artists.

== Early life ==
Chen was born in Guangdong, China on 24 September 1945. At age 9, he was accepted as a pupil of kung fu practitioner Chan Sau Chung, founder of the Tai Sing Pek Kwar Martial Arts Association which specializes in monkey style kung fu. While studying in Pui Kiu Middle School, he excelled in athletics, notably in javelin and soccer. After graduating, he worked as a stuntman and action director, his first project being Chor Yuen's 1970 film, Cold Blade. Chen attracted the attention of Cantonese filmmakers in 1969 after winning a light-weight division championship in Singapore's National Skills Competition. He eventually signed with the Shaw Brothers Studio in November of 1971. Unlike his contemporaries, Chen did not adopt a stage name.

== Career ==
Chen had been cast in some two dozen films with Shaw Brothers playing tertiary roles, amongst them Jimmy Wang Yu's The Chinese Boxer (1970) and Chang Cheh's Vengeance (1970) before he was cast in the role of Ma Yung Chen by Chang in the latter's kung fu film, The Boxer from Shantung. The film was his first lead role. At the time, Chen had been working with Ng See-yuen on his independent film, The Bloody Fists (1972) and left mid-production to film Chang's movie. Released in 1972, The Boxer From Shantung was a commercial success, netting over HK $2 million in ticket sales and launched Chen into stardom overnight. By the mid-1970s, he had become one of Hong Kong's most famous kung fu stars and achieved several hits including The Teahouse (1974), Heroes Two (1974), Big Brother Cheng (1975), and The Flying Guillotine (1975). At the 20th Asia-Pacific Film Festival, Chen was awarded Most Popular Male Actor by the Taipei Press Association.

In 1976, the actor expanded his career into directing and in February that year, made his directional debut with the comedy film, The Simple-Minded Fellow. The film was a moderate success at the box office. In October, Chen continued directing and filming with independent film companies in Taiwan, resulting in the Shaw Brothers Studio filing and winning a temporary injunction against the actor that prohibited him from making movies with any other company other than Shaw Brothers. Chen was also ordered to pay HK $700,000 in subsidies. The dispute lasted for nearly two years resulting in him briefly leaving Shaw studio after completing Lau Kar-leung's Challenge of the Masters (1976) and Executioners from Shaolin (1977). Due to his legal dispute, the five films he made in Taiwan, including his second directional project Iron Monkey (1977), were withheld or frequently pulled from theaters. The case was eventually settled in 1978 and Chen would return to Shaw Brothers after signing a new four-year contract requiring him to make at maximum two films per year with the company. Upon his return, Chen starred in Chang Cheh's Crippled Avengers, a film credited as revitalizing the actor's career. He remained with Shaw Brothers until their closure in 1985. His 1980 film, Killer Constable, has been praised as one of the studio's best wuxia films.

He starred in 164 films, around 80 of which were with Shaw Brothers. He directed five more films including Return to Action (1990) while his starring roles often focused on action, crime and, occasionally, comedy.

== Personal life and death ==
Chen was close friends with Chang Cheh and Ku Feng. He cited Chang as his favourite director and credited Ku with helping him learn Mandarin.

He was married four times. In 1976, he married fellow Shaw Brothers actress Cai Zhen-ni (stage name Ying Ying), with whom he had a daughter, Chen Yong-xi. Chen and Cai divorced in the following year. His second marriage was to Taiwanese actress and singer, Fong Yee-chun, with whom he had a son, Chen Jun-xiang. Chen and Fong later divorced. In 1990, he married Zhao Ting-ting in Australia, but the couple divorced a few years later. Chen married his fourth wife Tang Liping in 2017.

Chen owned a restaurant called Jimmy's Kitchen in Kolkata, India.

In 2012, Chen was expelled from the Tai Sing Pek Kwar Martial Arts Association due to a dispute with his mentor, Chan Sau Chung.

Chen died from a suspected cerebral haemorrhage on the morning of 2 September 2026 in Zhongshan, Guangdong, at age 80; efforts to resuscitate him were unsuccessful.

== Filmography ==
Year	Title	Role	Notes
1969	Two Sisters Who Steal	Thug	
1969	Redress	Robber with coloured face	
1969	Have Sword, Will Travel	Guard	
1970	Modern School Life	Peter	
1970	Wong Fei-Hung: Bravely Crushing the Fire Formation		
1970	The Secret of the Dirk	Black Tiger Clan member	
1970	Cold Blade		Producer, action director
1970	Vengeance		
1970	The Chinese Boxer	Casino guard (uncredited)	
1971	Betrayer	Hung Tien-piao	
1971	The Duel	Liu Shou Yi's guard	
1971	Maria	Gang member	
1971	Story of Thirty-Six Killers	Jiao Meng	
1971	The Comet Strikes	Waiter	
1971	The Chase		Action director
1971	The Deadly Duo		
1971	Bus stop		Action director
1971	The Invincible Iron Palm		Action director
1972	Huo Tang De Ai Ren		
1972	Many Faces of a Diamond		
1972	The Boxer from Shantung	Ma Yung Chen	
1972	The Hurricane		
1972	Impetuous Fire	Shi Di-Fen	
1972	The Water Margin	Tattooed Dragon Shih Chien	
1972	The Bloody Fight	Sun Ta-kuei	
1972	The Bloody Fists	Japanese long-haired boss	
1972	Young People	Ho Tai	
1972	Man of Iron	Chou Lien Huan	
1972	Four Riders	Li Wei-shi	
1973	Blood Brothers	Huang Chung	
1973	The House of 72 Tenants	Police constable	
1973	Thunderbolt		Action director
1973	Iron Bodyguard	Wang Yu	
1973	The Savage 5	Ma Dao	
1973	All Men Are Brothers	Shi Jin	
1973	The Bloody Escape	Bandit Gu Hui	
1974	The Teahouse	Wang 'Big Brother' Cheng	
1974	Heroes Two	Hung Hsi-kuan	
1974	The Savage Five	Ma Tao	
1974	Men from the Monastery	Hung Hsi-kuan	
1974	Hong Kong 73	Ambulance driver	
1974	Five Tough Guys	Wu Wen-Yuan	
1974	The Two Faces of Love		
1974	The Crazy Instructor		Producer
1975	The Floating Clouds	Lo Chin-Ying	
1975	Big Brother Cheng	Hung 'Big Brother' Cheng	
1975	The Flying Guillotine	Ma Teng	
1975	Temperament of Life		
1975	All Men Are Brothers	'Tattooed Dragon' Shih Chen	
1975	Lover's Destiny		
1975	The Imposter	Captain Lo Gin Yin	
1975	The Big Holdup	Ma Rulong	
1975	The Spiritual Boxer	Boxer #2	
1976	Big Bad Sis	Big Brother Cheng	
1976	7-Man Army	Chiang Ming-kun	
1976	Challenge of the Masters	Luk Ah Choy	
1976	King Gambler	Peng Tien-shih	
1976	The Simple-Minded Fellow		Director
1977	Executioners from Shaolin	Hung Hsi Kuan	
1977	Hero of Shanghai		
1977	Iron Monkey	Iron Monkey	Director
1977	Layout	Hsieh Hsiao-Lin	
1977	The Hero Tattoo with Nine Dragons		Producer
1977	Go a Little Crazy		Producer
1978	Crippled Avengers	Dao Tian-du	
1978	Duel at the Tiger Village	Cool Head	
1978	Invincible Monkey Fist		Director, action director
1979	Big Boss of Shanghai	Wong Chun Yung	Director
1979	Iron Fists	Chiu Tien-Hsing	
1979	Invincible Enforcer	Min	
1980	The Master	Jin Tien-yun	
1980	Rendezvous with Death	Golden Staff Ku Fei Tien	
1980	Killer Constable	Leng Tian-Ying	
1981	Bloody Monkey Master	Iron Monkey	
1981	Red Rattlesnake		
1981	Challenge of the Gamesters		
1981	Notorious Eight		
1981	The Battle for the Republic of China	Huang Ming-Hsuan	
1981	Dangerous Person	Inspector Chan	Director
1981	Notorious Eight	Zhou Shiqiang	
1981	Ambitious Kung Fu Girl	Qin Ge	
1981	Deadly Duo		
1982	Don't Love Any Stranger		
1982	Blood Brothers		
1982	Human Lanterns	Tan Fu	
1982	Raiders		
1982	The Tycoon		
1982	New Pilgrims to the West		
1982	Rolls, Rolls, I Love You	Mr. Cui Tung-Sing	
1982	Gang Master	Mang Yi-Tu	
1982	Little Flying Dragon		
1982	Winner Takes All	Miyamoto	
1982	Dirty Trick		
1982	Who Is the Killer?		Director
1982	Seven Knights		
1982	Demi-Gods and Semi-Devils	Ye-lut Hung-kei	
1983	Little Dragon Maiden	Guo Jing	
1983	Deadly Life of a Ninja	Chow Han-wei	
1983	The Black Magic with Buddha	Chin Ben	
1983	Mission Thunderbolt		
1983	The Lost Generation	Paul	
1983	The Challenge of the Lady Ninja	Lee Tong	
1984	Opium and the Kung-Fu Master	Rong Feng	
1984	Shanghai 13	Shen Gang Fu	
1984	Return of the Bastard Swordsman	Mochitsuki Soryu Han	
1984	Butcher		
1984	The 3 Heroes		
1984	Death Ring		
1984	Majestic Thunderbolt		
1984	Chak Sing		
1984	I Will Finally Knock You Down, Dad!		
1985	How to Choose a Royal Bride	Tian Di Hui chief	
1985	The Dancing Warrior	Rich man	
1986	Tai-Pan	Wung	Cameo role; First appearance in an English-speaking movie; credited as Chan Koon Tai
1987	Fortune Hunters	Leopard	
1988	Human Sentiment Law		
1988	Long Fa Tang		
1988	The Rebellious Husband		
1989	Just Heroes		
1989	The Sniping		
1989	Angel's Mission		
1990	Return to Action	Chen Yun Chan	Director, producer
1990	The Fortune Code	Triad boss gambler	
1990	Sleazy Dizzy	Chen Yuan Long	
1990	Forsaken Cop		Producer
1990	Blood Stained Tradewind		Producer
1991	Tri in Triad		
1991	All Mighty Gambler	Tai	
1991	The Tigers	Hon-Wai	
1991	Today's Hero	Triad boss	
1992	Heroin Tunnel		
1992	The Trouble Couple		
1992	Gambling Soul	Policeman	
1992	Ghost Killer		
1992	The World of Desire	Uncle Won	
1993	Bogus Cops	Officer Wu	
1993	Angel of the Road		
1993	Shadow Cop		
1996	How to Meet the Lucky Stars	Liu Tin	
2001	The Final Winner	Brother Cheng	
2002	The Era of Vampires	Zombie wrangler	
2004	Hero Youngster	Wei Bai-Hao	
2004	Fearful 24 Hours	Shih Jin Jiang	
2005	Where Is Mama's Boy?	Mad Cow	
2006	Dragon Tiger Gate	Ma Kun	
2006	My Wife Can Fight		
2007	The Valiant Ones New		
2008	Kung Fu Hip-Hop	Second uncle	
2009	Murderer	Tai	
2010	14 Blades	Fazheng	
2010	Gallants	Dragon	
2011	White Vengeance	Qiu Ran	
2012	No Retreat		
2012	The Man with the Iron Fists	Golden Lion	
2013	Conspirators		
2013	7 Assassins		
2013	Glory Days	Brother Tai	
2013	The Real Iron Monkey	Iron Monkey	
2014	Once Upon a Time in Shanghai	Baldy Bai	
2015	The Master	Dojo head	
2015	The Choice: A Story of the Old Shanghai		
2016	Cherry Returns		
2016	Xin Gui Da Gui		
2016	Muay Thai Girls		
2016	Shed Skin Papa	Brother Tai	
2017	The Hidden Sword	Master Kong	
2017	Dealer/Healer		
2017	An Idiot Lost in Xiangxi		
2018	Burning Summer		
2018	Keyboard Warriors		
2018	Iceman: The Time Traveler	Eunuch Wei	
2019	Real You, Fake Me		
2022	Legendary in Action!	Master Dragon	

=== Television ===
Year	Title	Role	Notes
1980	Blowing in the Wind	Shi Jiawei	
1980	Dai dey yan ching	Lee Dai-sek	
1983	Never Bow Down	Zeng Zhanpeng	
1983	Never Bow Down sequel	Zeng Zhanpeng	
1983	Super Hero	Lei Huaiwu	
1984	Looking back suddenly		
1986	The Romance of the White Hair Maiden	Ngok Ming-or	
1986	A generation of heroes	Tan Si	director
1987	Pretty girl good luck		
1990	Pioneer of Integrity (Third Series)	Zhu Taixing	
1991	Sai Jinhua	Lu Yufang	
2000	The Duke of Mount Deer	Hong Antong	
2000	Mi Xia		
2002	The Legendary Siblings 2	Ye Tianzhao	
2004	Yixinren		
2005	dangerous person	Liu Youxing	Episode 9 "Betting on Life"
2008	JingWuChenZhen	Ichiro Watanabe	
2010	Who's the Hero	Fu Xiaobo	
2010	Detective Tanglang	Sheng Ting Fan	
2013	Bloody Island	Hiroshi Fujiwara	
2017	Psycho Detective	Deputy Director Chen	
2019	fantasy adventure king	He Baiqin	
