= Alfonso Wong =

Hong Kong manhua artist

- Born: 27 May 1923 Tianjin, Republic of China
- Died: 1 January 2017 (aged 93) California, United States
- Area: Cartoonist
- Pseudonyms: Wong Chak (王澤), Alphonso Wong
- Notable works: Old Master Q series
- Children: 3
- Relatives: Wang Chengbin (father)

Alfonso Wong
- Chinese: 王家禧
Transcriptions
Standard Mandarin
- Hanyu Pinyin: Wáng Jiāxǐ
- Wade–Giles: Wang2 Chia1-hsi3
Yue: Cantonese
- Jyutping: wong4 gaa1 hei1

Wong Chak
- Traditional Chinese: 王澤
- Simplified Chinese: 王泽
Transcriptions
Standard Mandarin
- Hanyu Pinyin: Wáng Zé
- Wade–Giles: Wang2 Tse2
Yue: Cantonese
- Jyutping: wong4 zaak6

Alfonso Wong Kar-Hei (Chinese: 王家禧; 27 May 1923 – 1 January 2017), also known by his pen name Wong Chak, was a Hong Kong manhua artist who created one of the longest-running comic strips, Old Master Q, that became popular across Asia.

== Biography ==
Wong was born in Tianjin, Republic of China to general Wang Chengbin. He studied Western art at Fu Jen Catholic University, which was based in Beijing at the time, and graduated by 1944. In 1956, he moved to British Hong Kong. He created drawings for a French Catholic missionary and also became the art editor for a Hong Kong Catholic magazine, Lok Fung Pao (乐峰报; 樂峰報; Lè Fēng Bào; lok6 fung1 bou3).

Wong became well known in 1962 when he made the manhua Old Master Q. The comic was one of the most influential pieces of work in Hong Kong under British rule before it was transferred back to China, and was popular across Asia. It voiced the opinions of the citizens in an exaggerated and humorous sense at a time when comics avoided controversial political issues. Wong's comic broached subjects including integration with mainlanders to the education gap. The comic became known for maintaining popularity for more than 40 years against endless competition with other Hong Kong manhua and Japanese manga. He later emigrated to the United States and retired by the mid-1990s, leaving his son in charge of the series. Old Master Q has been widely adapted into films, Chinese animation, and other works of fiction.

In an exhibition showcasing Wong, the Hong Kong Arts Centre called his work, "a collective memory of Chinese-speaking communities around the world." Original pieces of Wong's work have been exhibited by both Sotheby's and Christie's auction houses.

== Personal life ==
Wong was ambidextrous and particularly enjoyed drawing fish.

Wong had three sons with his wife. He used his eldest son's name Wong Chak (王澤; 王泽; wong4 zaak6; Wáng Zé) as a pen name and relinquished the comic to him in 1995.

Wong later immigrated to California, where he died of organ failure on 1 January 2017, at the age of 93.
