= The Boxer's Omen =

1983 Hong Kong film by Kuei Chih-hung

- Theatrical release poster
- Directed by: Kuei Chih-Hung
- Screenplay by: On Szeto
- Story by: Kuei Chih-Hung
- Produced by: Mona Fong
- Starring: Phillip Ko; Shao-Yen Lin; Kar-Man Wai; Bolo Yeung
- Cinematography: Li Hsin-Yeh
- Edited by: Chiang Hsing-Lung; Henry Cheung Siu-Hei; So Chan-Kwok
- Music by: Shing Chin-Yung; Su Chen-Hou
- Production company: Shaw Brothers
- Distributed by: Celestial Pictures (2006)
- Release date: 29 October 1983 (Hong Kong)
- Running time: 105 minutes
- Country: Hong Kong
- Language: Mandarin

The Boxer's Omen (Chinese: 魔; pinyin: Mó, lit. 'Magic') is a 1983 Hong Kong horror film directed by Kuei Chih-Hung and produced by Shaw Brothers Studio. It is sometimes described as a sequel to Chih-Hung's Bewitched (1981).

== Plot ==
Chan Hung is a Hong Kong gangster and the brother of Chan Wing, a heavyweight boxer. The film opens during a brutal boxing match between Wing and Thai fighter Bu Bo. Wing eventually wins the fight, but Bo lands a sucker punch after the fight ends, paralyzing Wing. Shortly thereafter, the leaders of Hung's organization are killed by rival gangsters. Hung is abducted, but his captors are killed by an apparition of a Buddhist monk, and Hung begins to see more religious visions.

Wing asks Hung to get revenge on Bu Bo, so Hung travels to Thailand and challenges Bo to a match. He visits a Buddhist temple seeking information on his visions, whereupon he is informed that his coming was prophesied by the temple's deceased head abbot Qing Zhao. A year earlier, Qing had himself traveled to Hong Kong to break apart a gang of black magicians, killing one and disrupting the rituals of another. The second magician assassinated Qing by training spiders to stab him through the eyes with their stingers, killing him just as he was about to achieve immortality. Qing has nevertheless sustained his soul through his powers, and predicted that a twin of his from a past life (Hung) would arrive three months following his bodily death. Trapped in his decaying body, Qing asks Hung to become a monk, defeat the black magicians, and help him achieve immortality. After some hesitation, Hung agrees.

Hung takes the name Baluo Kaidi and trains in arduous conditions. Eventually he is granted magical powers and ordained as a hunter of black magic. Baluo challenges the magician who killed Qing to a ritual duel; during it, he neutralizes the magician's various spells and brutally kills him. Baluo returns to Hong Kong and breaks one of the tenets of his monastic vows by having sex with his girlfriend. During Baluo's fight with Bu Bo, the remaining black magicians begin a series of rites to take revenge on the monk, eventually creating an undead warrior. One of the spells injures Qing (and thus Baluo) during the boxing match, disorienting Baluo and nearly allowing Bu Bo to win. Though Baluo overpowers Bo, he begins to see hellish visions.

Baluo returns to Thailand to kill the remaining magicians, and he and his teacher extract an invulnerability-granting liquid from a plant in an abandoned temple. During the renewal of his vows, Baluo lies when asked if he has broken his vow of chastity, triggering a magical reaction and his expulsion from the temple. Baluo seeks help from Qing, who reveals that he will die shortly (killing Baluo in the process) unless he retrieves the ashes of one of Qing's past selves, venerated as a relic in Nepal.

Baluo travels to Nador Buddhist Lamasery in Kathmandu (actually filmed at Swayambhunath), where he finds the relic guarded by a series of magical defenses. He consumes the invulnerability potion and surmounts the defenses when he is attacked by the undead warrior. Eventually, the ashes manifest their own power, killing first the undead warrior and then the remaining black magicians. When Balou takes the ashes, spider-stingers remove themselves from his eyes, and he finds himself back in the monastery in Thailand. Qing has healed himself and become an immortal being with iridescent crystal skin. As the monks move to honor Qing, Baluo quietly exits the temple.

== Production ==
=== Special effects ===
Gordon Chan was a member of the special effects unit on the film.

== Release ==
=== Theatrical ===
==== Re-releases ====
On 6 May 2011, The Boxer's Omen was screened at the Charles Theatre in Baltimore, Maryland, U.S., as part of the 2011 Maryland Film Festival. The screening was chosen and presented by the band Animal Collective.

=== Home media ===
The Boxer's Omen was released on DVD by Image Entertainment on 21 November 2006.

Arrow Video released the film on Blu-ray as part of a 14-film Shawscope: Volume 2 box set, in December 2022.

== Reception ==
=== Retrospective assessments ===
Donald Guarisco of AllMovie gave the film a rating of two-and-a-half out of five stars, criticizing its characterizations as simplistic and noting that "the story starts to drag a little bit in its last third," but commending the finale for its "uniquely Buddhist slant on the concept of a battle between two wizards". He also wrote that the film "has long had a reputation for outrageousness with horror addicts and Asian film fans alike. Those unfamiliar with the film will be happy to know that the film truly lives up to that reputation [...] Ultimately, The Boxer's Omen might be a little too eccentric and intense for some viewers but horror fans looking for their equivalent of a 'head movie' will adore this film for its singular mix of Western horror-movie shocks and Asian mysticism."

Jay Seaver of eFilmCritic.com gave the film four out of five stars, writing, "The Boxer's Omen seems like two extremely different movies made into one... It is a downright strange movie wrapped in something conventional and almost unrelated, a fine midnight movie if there ever was one."

== See also ==
- Cinema of Hong Kong
