= Big Brother Cheng =

1975 Hong Kong film by Kuei Chih-hung

- Film poster
- Chinese: 大哥成
- Hanyu Pinyin: Dà Gē Chéng
- Jyutping: Daai6 Go1 Sing4
- Directed by: Kuei Chih-Hung
- Screenplay by: On Szeto
- Story by: Chiang Chih-Nan
- Produced by: Runme Shaw
- Starring: Kuan Tai Chen; Karen Yeh; Yue Wong; Lin Tung
- Cinematography: Chi Yu
- Edited by: Chiang Hsing-Lung; Henry Cheung Siu-Hei
- Music by: Frankie Chan
- Production company: Shaw Brothers Studio
- Distributed by: Shaw Brothers Studio
- Release date: 16 July 1975
- Running time: 107 minutes
- Country: Hong Kong
- Language: Cantonese

Big Brother Cheng (Hong Kong: Daai Go Shing or Daai Go Sing, lit. Big Brother Shing or Big Brother Sing) is a 1975 sequel to the Hong Kong hit crime drama The Teahouse directed by Kuei Chih-Hung. Written by On Szeto, it follows the eponymous character as he continues to protect his community from thugs.

== Cast ==
- Kuan Tai Chen as Wang 'Big Brother' Cheng
- Karen Yeh as Mrs. Wang
- Yue Wong as 'Hak-zai' Mun
- Lin Tung as Police Officer
