= Armando Salas =

Galician cartoonist (1946–2019)

- Born: 30 January 1946; Ortigueira, Galicia, Spain
- Died: 30 June 2019 (aged 73); Ferrol, Galicia, Spain

Armando Salas (30 January 1946, Ortigueira – 30 June 2019) was a Galician cartoonist.

Salas was one of the first cartoonists to bring eroticism to Spanish publications in the form of semi-nude girls, tempered with irony and sarcasm during the dictatorship of General Francisco Franco. During this era in 1967, he began drawing professionally for the news-magazine Diez Minutos, and for Comics Camp and Comics In, a fanzine dedicated to the study of comics where he created "Saturday", an ironic take on "Sunday", a popular comics character created by Víctor de la Fuente. Around 1970, he contributed editorial cartoons to the daily Pueblo, and he also joined the staff of the daily El Correo Gallego and the magazine Doblón. That same year he started contributing on the TV journal Todo Television, and he also created a syndicated panel series, "Don Teleneco", in which he satirized "couch potatoes". He began working for the daily El Diario de Ferrol in 1972, and a year later he contributed cartoons to Heraldo Español, in the province of Aragon.

He created his most well-known series, "El Eden", for the Spanish comics magazine El Globo. It was renamed "Adan" for publication in book form. This Spanish cartoon series was a satirical view of Adam and Eve, in which Eve, a blonde in the Marilyn Monroe mold, appeared in a bikini. While working in several mediums, he also created another cartoon series, "Jauja y Colas." And another series came in 1981: "Merlina", about a female wizard who was beautiful, sexy and "ready for anything." Less than six months later Merlina was also published in book form.

Armando Salas published over 40,000 artworks during his career. In 2005 he was awarded the international prize Curuxa De Honra, given by the Museum of Humor in Fene, in Galicia, Spain. Several of his cartoons can be found at this museum. He was also the author of the poster-tribute to Russian journalist Anna Politkovskaya. Nowadays this poster is distributed worldwide by Reporters without Borders. Salas is listed in the World Encyclopedia of Cartoons by Maurice Horn (Chelsea House Publishers (Philadelphia). May 1999).
