= The Teahouse =

1974 Hong Kong film by Kuei Chih-Hung

- Film poster
- Directed by: Kuei Chih-Hung
- Screenplay by: On Szeto
- Story by: Chiang Chih-Nan
- Produced by: Runme Shaw
- Starring: Chen Kuan Tai; Karen Yeh; Wu Chi Liu; Lin Tung; Huang Chien-Lung
- Cinematography: Chi Yu
- Edited by: Chiang Hsing-Lung; Chang Shao-Hsi
- Distributed by: Shaw Brothers
- Release date: 19 October 1974
- Running time: 96 minutes
- Country: Hong Kong
- Language: Cantonese

The Teahouse is a 1974 Hong Kong crime drama film directed by Kuei Chih-Hung. Written by On Szeto, the film is about an immigrant restaurant owner trying to protect his family from juvenile gangs. It was such a hit that the film was followed by a 1975 sequel, Big Brother Cheng, with kung fu star Chen Kuan Tai reprising the eponymous role.

== Plot ==
In the 1970s, Big Brother Shing (大哥成, played by Chen Kuan‑tai) is a middle-aged new immigrant who had fled from mainland China to Hong Kong. Together with several fellow villagers, he opens the Shing Kee Teahouse; through hard work, they made a living, and the business flourished. Unfortunately, the teahouse staff become embroiled several times in conflicts involving triad interests. Big Brother Shing steps forward to protect them, which in turn provokes two major underworld factions, Lei Kung Tong (雷公同) and Prince Kei (太子基). Big Brother Shing matches wits and strength with the gangs, eventually infuriating Prince Kei, who leads a large group of men to storm Shing Kee Teahouse. Big Brother Shing and his staff rise up in resistance. The police arrive, and Prince Kei and his followers are all arrested. The authorities demand that Big Brother Shing hand over whatever triad intelligence he knows, while Lei Kung Tong simultaneously attempts to lure him into their organization. All of this plunged Big Brother Cheng into deep conflict and anguish; he felt as though he had lost even the right to be a good person. Driven by the pressing circumstances, he was left with no choice but to continue his life on the run.

== Cast ==
- Chen Kuan Tai as Wang 'Big Brother' Cheng
- Karen Yeh as Mrs. Wang
- Wu Chi Liu as Hsien Chu
- Lin Tung as Police Officer
- Huang Chien-Lung as Hsi Tieng
- Feng Lin as Tan Yen-yung
- Yang Chih Ching as Fa-Dat Tso
- Shen Chan as Sheng Fan-ming
- Yang Chiang as Shui Niu-chia
- Peng Fei-Li as Chui Dai-fu
- Ping Ha as Auntie Tan
- Keng Chang as Prosecuting Judge
