= Youth of China (film) =

1937 Hong Kong film by Wong Tat-Tsoi

Youth Of China (Chinese: 中国青年; pinyin: Zhōngguó Qīngnián) is a 1937 patriotic film directed by Wong Tat-Tsoi. Starring Cho-Fan Ng (zh), Gao Luquan, Lau Kuai-Hong (zh), Wu Mei Lun (zh), Siu-Hing Wong (黄笑馨), Yan-Fu Yip (叶仁甫).
