= Monkey Kung Fu =

Chinese martial art

Monkey kung fu 猴拳
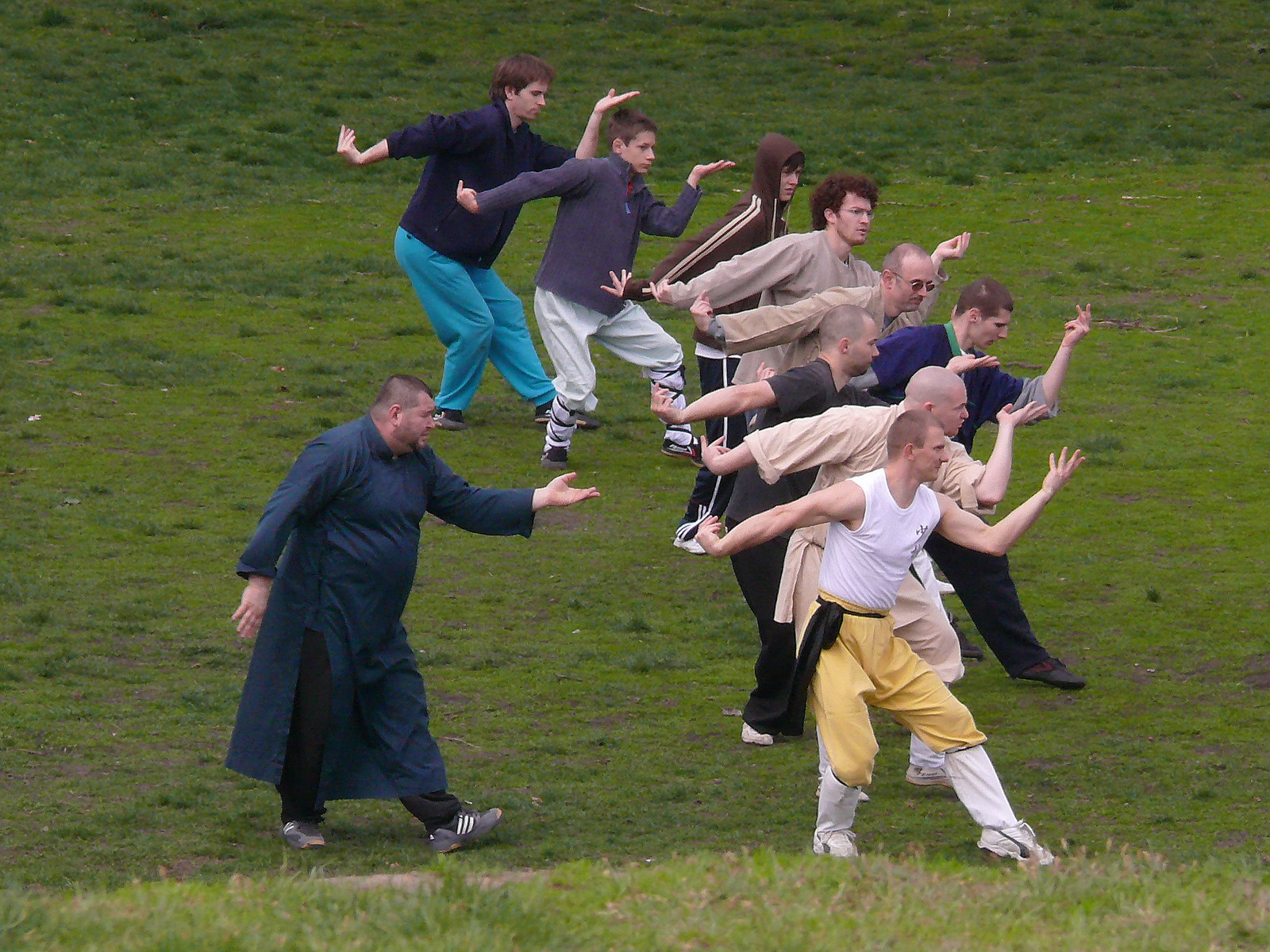
- People practicing monkey kung fu in City Park (Budapest), Hungary
- Also known as: Hóu Quán, Dà Shèng Mén, Monkey Boxing, Monkey Fist, Tai Shing Pek Kwar
- Country of origin: China
- Creator: Kou Si (Kou Sze), (Kau Sei) 寇四
- Famous practitioners: Geng De Hai (Gan Dak Hoi), Chan Sau Chung, Xiao Yingpeng, Chen Kuan-tai, Hsiao Ho, Paulie Zink, Michael Matsuda.
- Descendant arts: Wuzuquan, Northern Praying Mantis

Monkey kung fu or Hóu Quán (猴拳, "monkey fist") is a Chinese martial art which utilizes ape or monkey-like movements as part of its technique.

Northern Chinese martial arts such as Northern Praying Mantis and Wuzuquan incorporate some of the techniques from monkey kung fu.

== Origins ==
Monkey kung fu first originated from the Southern Shaolin Temple as Hou Quan (猴拳) monkey kung fu, as well as the better-known Dà Shèng Pī Guà Mén (大聖劈掛門) style. There are a number of independently developed systems of monkey kung fu. Some are integrated in Five Animal Kung Fu, Ng Ying Kung Fu systems. On its own standing examples include Xíng-Zhě-Mén (行者門) named after the protagonist Sun Wukong of the popular Ming dynasty novel Journey to the West, and Nán-Hóu-Quán (南猴拳) or Southern Monkey Fist.

=== Hou Quan ===
The Hou Quan style from the Emei region, taught by the famous "Monkey King" Xiao Yingpeng and others, was also used as the basis for the modern wushu variant of monkey style (and monkey staff) that is often seen in demonstrations and competitions today. Each independent style has its own unique approach to the expression of how to incorporate a monkey's movements into fighting.

=== Da Sheng Men ===
Da Sheng Men, or "Great Sage" Kung Fu, was developed near the end of the Qing dynasty (1911) by a fighter named Kou Si (Kau Sei) from a small village in Northern China. Legend states that while serving a sentence in prison, he observed a group of monkeys from his cell. As he studied their movements and mannerisms, he found that they combined well with his own Di Tang style. While exact circumstances of Kou Si's inspiration remain legend, upon his release he developed his new style of fighting and dubbed it 'Da Sheng Men' (Great Sage Style) in honor of the Monkey King Sun Wukong in the Buddhist tale Journey to the West.

=== Da Sheng Pi Gua ===
Da Sheng Pi Gua Kung Fu 大聖劈掛門 (also known as Tai Sing Pek Kwar) was developed by Kou Si's(寇四) student Geng De Hai (耿德海) who started learning Pi Gua kung fu from his father Kan Wing Kwai(耿榮貴) from as early as 8 years of age. Gan Wing Gwai was a master of Pi Gua kung fu and after his death, Kou Si decided to train Geng De Hai in Da Sheng Kung Fu. After mastering Da Sheng Kung Fu and combining it with Pi Gua Kung Fu, out of respect for Kou Si's friendship, i.e. attacks are aimed at the knees, groin area, throat or eyes of the opponent and hand strikes are normally either open handed slaps or clawing with a semi-closed fist called the monkey claw. A wide array of facial monkey expressions are also practiced, inclusive of happiness, anger, fear, fright, confusion and bewilderment etc. Except for very brief periods, most movements inclusive of running are executed from either a squatting or semi-squatting position and are normally accompanied by very swift and 'jerky' head movements as the practitioner nervously looks around. The monkey staff, or hou gun (猴棍), is one of this style's specialty weapons. Monkey boxing is an imitative technique and so execution of the movements and facial expressions must be so convincing that it looks exactly like a monkey and not simply like a human imitating a monkey hence the very high degree of difficulty associated with this technique.

=== Tai Shing ===
There are five variations of monkey kung fu developed an naming the new technique Geng De Hai placed Da Sheng at the beginning followed by Pi Gua hence the name Da Sheng Pi Gua Kung Fu.

== Techniques ==
=== Hou Quan ===
Traditional hou quan as taught in Mainland China includes running on all fours (i.e. the hands and feet), various difficult acrobatic movements such as flipping sideways in the air, front flips, back flips, back handsprings, hand stands, walking on the hands, forward lunges/dives, backward lunges, spinning on the butt, spinning on the back and many kicks and strikes. Most of this part of the Tai Shing system:

1. Drunken Monkey focuses on throat, eye, and groin strikes, as well as tumbling and falling techniques. It incorporates false steps to affect defenselessness and off-balance strikes. The practitioner waddles, takes very faltering steps, and sometimes falls to the ground and lies prone while waiting for the opponent to approach, at which time a devastating attack is launched at the knees or groin. Drunken monkey uses more internal energy than any other variations, and is one of the more difficult monkey styles to master, but also extremely effective against a standard, attack-oriented enemy. Countering this style involves shifting body position often to ensure that the Drunken Monkey user's techniques strike more solid, tougher areas of the body.
2. Stone Monkey is a more physically focused style. The practitioner trains up his body to exchange blows with the opponent - a kind of iron body method. A practitioner often leaves an area exposed, inviting an opponent to attack, then attacks a more vital spot on their body. It is important not to attack reflexively at open spots, and try to hammer away
3. Standing Monkey or Tall Monkey is a relatively conventional monkey variation that maintains an upright position. This style is better suited for tall people. Tall monkey likes to climb body limbs to make attacks at pressure points. It is a long range style.
4. Wooden Monkey mimics a serious, angry monkey that attacks and defends with ferocity. This variation is more serious, and its movements are noticeably less light than the other monkeys. Wood monkey involves grappling opponents to the ground at their weak spots until they give in.
5. Lost Monkey heavily incorporates feints. Practitioners of Lost Monkey give the appearance of being lost and confused to deceive their opponents into underestimating their abilities, then retaliate when it is least expected. The hands and footwork change and flow from each other at will. Monkeys are sociable animals that live in troupes or family groups, but are also very territorial by nature. So when they wander into the territory of another troupe, there is normally a fight, which could possibly result in the death of the trespassers. This technique incorporates the fear, nervousness and mischief of a monkey who has wandered into a neighboring territory, in that it attempts to pick and eat as many fruits and insects as quickly as possible, while nervously looking around before scurrying back to its own home range.

== In popular culture ==
The following films and television programs showcase Monkey Kung Fu either throughout the film or in major scenes:

- Hou quan kou si, English title Monkey's Fist (1974), features real-life Monkey Kung Fu specialist Chan Sau Chung.
- Tie ma liu, English title Iron Monkey (1977), starring Chen Kuan Tai.
- In the film Knockabout (1979), the lead protagonist Yipao uses the monkey fist technique (which he learned from a police officer pretending to be a beggar) against The Fox, which happens to be his former master and the one who killed his friend Taipao.
- Feng hou, English title Mad Monkey Kung-Fu (1979), although the technique displayed in this film is really the 'monkey' variation of the Lau Family Hung Gar system and not genuine Da Sheng Pi Gua Kung Fu.
- Chu long ma liu, English title Monkey Fist Floating Snake (1979), starring Simon Chan.
- Zui hou nu, English title Lady Iron Monkey (1979), starring Fung Ling Kam.
- Liu he qian shou, English title Return of the Scorpion, (1979) features 7 Kung Fu masters, one (i.e. Chan Sau Chung) is a practitioner of Monkey Kung Fu. In the first fight scene, Chan Sau Chung does a few movements of the Drunken Monkey technique in that he take a few faltering steps (i.e. Monkey Staggering Steps) then he lies prone and waits for his opponent to approach at which time he does a massive wheel kick and immediately launches an attack at his opponent's groin (i.e. angry monkey steals the peaches).
- The English dub of Jackie Chan's Drunken Master II (1994) (AKA The Legend of Drunken Master (2000) (U.S.)) incorrectly references the Drunken Monkey style whenever Wong Fei-hung is about to perform some acrobatic kicks. The original dialogue actually references the immortals Li Tieguai and Zhang Gualao of the Daoist style of Drunken Fist. The former is a cripple with a powerful right leg and the latter is known for his swift double-kicks. All eight immortals are also referenced in the original Drunken Master (1978).
- Chui ma lau, English title Drunken Monkey (2002), uses the Monkey fist variant Drunken Monkey, although the technique displayed in this film is really the 'monkey' variation of the Lau Family Hung Gar system and not genuine Tai Shing Pak Kwar Kung Fu.
- In Kim Possible, Kim's sidekick, Ron Stoppable, is imbued with the abilities of a Monkey Kung Fu master by four ancient statues. Lord Monty Fiske is a practitioner of Da Sheng Pi Gua who had his hands and feet surgically altered to resemble those of monkeys and adopted the name Monkey Fist.
- In the film "Extreme Fighter," Monkey Kung Fu master Michael Matsuda co-stars in the role of the "monkey man."
- In the film Bloodsport a Monkey Kung Fu user participates in an underground fighting tournament.
- In Star Wars: Episode I – The Phantom Menace, Ray Park can be seen using an adapted form of Monkey Kung Fu as Sith Lord Darth Maul.
- Eileen from the video game Virtua Fighter series uses "Kou-Ken" known as Monkey Kung Fu.
- In the Mortal Kombat series, the ninja wraith character Noob Saibot fights with Monkey Kung Fu.
- In the Kung Fu Panda franchise, the character Monkey is a monkey who practices kung fu. He is voiced by Jackie Chan in the film, and James Sie in the accompanying television series, Kung Fu Panda: Legends of Awesomeness.
- In the film The Quest, the representative from China uses an obvious monkey style for his second match.
- In the film Ip Man 2, Master Law (Lo Mang) is the first master that Ip Man fights on the tabletop, and is a master of Monkey-Style Kung Fu.

== See also ==
- Dragon dance
- Lion dance
- Drunken Monkey
