= Ko Lo Chuen =

Hong Kong actor

Ng Kui Chuen (Chinese: 吳鉅泉), better known by his stage name Ko Lo Chuen (Chinese: 高魯泉, 1909 – May 13, 1988), was a Hong Kong actor. Ko and his brother began acting in the 1930s.

== Biography ==
Ko was born in 1909 as Ng Kui Chuen. He got his stage name based on his nickname describing his tall appearance. His brother was Ng Cho-fan, who was also an actor. They both acted movies with martial arts star Bruce Lee in 1950 and 1960. In 1950, Ko acted as a secretary in Bruce Lee's film, The Kid. In 1960, his brother acted as a headmaster in Bruce Lee' film, The Orphan, Ko was also in the film. Before acting films, he was a teacher of a primary school. He died on May 13, 1988, at the age of 79.

== Filmography ==
- 1937 Youth of China (film)
- 1950 The Kid - Secretary Ko
- 1960 The Orphan
- 1990 Kung Fu Vs. Acrobatic - Man in intro (From Buddah's Palm 1964)
