= Sophie's Revenge =

- Film poster
- Directed by: Eva Jin
- Written by: Eva Jin
- Produced by: Zhang Ziyi; Ling Lucas; Ming Beaver Kwei
- Starring: Zhang Ziyi; Fan Bingbing; Peter Ho; So Ji-sub; Yao Chen; Ruby Lin
- Cinematography: Armando Salas
- Edited by: Tang Hua; Cheung Ka-Fai
- Music by: Nathan Wang
- Production companies: Perfect World Pictures; CJ Entertainment; Sophie Production Ltd.
- Distributed by: China Film Group; EDKO
- Release date: 14 August 2009
- Running time: 108 minutes
- Country: China
- Language: Mandarin
- Budget: US$7 million
- Box office: US$15.2 million

Sophie's Revenge (Chinese: 非常完美; pinyin: Fēicháng Wánměi; "Very Perfect") is a 2009 Chinese-Korean co-production starring Zhang Ziyi, So Ji-sub, Fan Bingbing, Ruby Lin, Peter Ho, and Yao Chen.

This movie is a co-production between Perfect World Pictures with South Korean company CJ Entertainment. Sound and effects help also came from South Korea through Seoul-based postproduction houses Blue Cap and HFR. According to the news, China Film Group released "Sophie's Revenge" on 14 August in China on more than 1,000 screens nationwide.

A prequel titled My Lucky Star starring Zhang Ziyi and Wang Leehom was produced in 2013.

== Synopsis ==
Comic book artist Sophie (Zhang Ziyi) is a sweet and carefree girl brimming with creativity. She and her handsome surgeon boyfriend of two years, Jeff (So Ji-sub), are the perfect couple. After his marriage proposal to her in front of her family and all of her friends, Sophie is the happiest person in the world.

One day, Jeff meets a famous movie star, Joanna (Fan Bingbing), during a surgical procedure. Immediately afterwards, he breaks up with Sophie.

Devastated, Sophie takes to bed. She is unable to face anyone, especially her mother, who had been planning the wedding. Sophie decides to cover up the break-up, with only her two best friends, Lucy (Ruby Lin) and Lily (Yao Chen) knowing the truth. She comes up with a master plan: she will use the remaining two months before the wedding date to do whatever it takes to get Jeff back.

She also plans to publish her many strategies in her new comic book. She wants to show women everywhere how to use a 'scientific' approach to win love back. Sophie's first strategy of "Generosity and Forgiveness" does not go well. At a Halloween party, hosted by Gordon (Peter Ho), a photographer, she drowns her sorrows in alcohol. She stumbles upon a photo of Gordon and Joanna together which immediately gives her the idea of forming an alliance with him, believing they were lovers. Gordon agrees to become Sophie's partner and her quest for revenge becomes a roller coaster of farcical twists and turns.

Soon after a Christmas party at Gordon's place, Joanna reveals to Sophie that she has never lost Jeff at all and asked Gordon to keep an eye on her. It was then revealed that he and Joanna are actually siblings because he's been taking care of her since they were young. Feeling betrayed, Sophie gives up the notions of love and tells Gordon to leave her alone. Her mother then learns the truth and is finally able to convince her to give love another chance. Sophie calls off her relationship with Jeff and goes to visit Gordon, just to find he's gone and Joanna is there instead. Joanna tells her Gordon left for Europe, not even saying when he plans to come back. She also tells Sophie that Gordon's love for her is real.

For two years she had no news from Gordon, so she decided to draw their story into a book with the intention of helping others discover their own inner-selves and true love.

At the end Gordon, and Little San-hei, meet her again and both reveal they still have feelings for each other.

== Cast ==
- Zhang Ziyi as Sophie (Chinese: 苏菲; pinyin: Sūfēi)

Late twenties. Comic Book artist. She is a creative, strong-willed young lady who is full of creative ideas.

- Peter Ho as Gordon (Chinese: 常瑞; pinyin: Chángruì)

A photographer, he gets entangled in Sophie's web of intrigue. Gordon is Joanna's older brother who has been taking care of her since their parents died, but it wasn't revealed until near the end of the movie.

- Fan Bingbing as Joanna (Chinese: 王菁菁; pinyin: Wáng Jīngjīng)

Late twenties, famous movie star. She is Gordon's younger sister.

- So Ji-sub as Jeff (Chinese: 李杰夫; pinyin: Li Jiéfu)

Early thirties, USA-trained surgeon. Since Jeff is the "dream husband", two women (his ex-girlfriend and current girlfriend) fight for his love. He cannot stand the idea of his girlfriend still tangled up with his old flame.

- Ruby Lin as Lucy (Chinese: 陆小夕; pinyin: Lù Xiǎoxī)

Late twenties, Sophie's close friend and her literary agent. She changes her boyfriends faster than she changes her underwear.

- Yao Chen as Lily (Chinese: 李莉; pinyin: Lilì)

Late twenties, Sophie's other close friend. Her greatest goal in life is to marry a rich man.

- Wang Ji as Sophie's mother
- Cheng Qian as Host Role

== Production ==
Sophie's Revenge is written and directed by Chinese-American filmmaker Eva Jin. The "memory box boy" from the film came from a dream that director Eva Jin had. Lead Zhang Ziyi co-financed the film, according to Sina.com. The project was announced by the South Korean company CJ Entertainment at the Busan International Film Festival in 2008.

Sophie's Revenge is Zhang Ziyi's first appearance in such an avant-garde film. Compared to many of Zhang's other films, it has a more ordinary and simple plot and a contemporary setting. The story, set in Beijing, features top Asian stars and Chinese remakes of bouncy K-pop songs, but shows no hint of regional color and strictly limits the camera to cosmopolitan venues like gyms and modern art galleries.

The rights to the English version of "Perfect Match" were bought by the American production company Mosaic Media Group, and Jin Yimeng became the first person in China to have her script adapted by the United States.

== Staff ==
- Director : Eva Jin
- Writer : Eva Jin
- Producer : Ming Beaver Kwei
- Producer : Ling Lucas
- Producer : Zhang Ziyi
- Cinematographer : Armando Salas
- Production Designer : Second Chan
- Visual Effects supervisor : Sing-Choong Foo
- Edit : Cheung Ka-Fai, Tang Hua
- Music : Nathan Wang
- Additional Music : Dong Dongdong
- Sound Designer : Kim Suk-Won
- Executive Producer : Song Ge, Katharine Kim, Wang Wei, Nathan Chow, Kevin Yung
- Producers : Du Yang, Mike Hyun-Dong Shu
- Co-Producer : Second Chan

== Reception ==
Ben Umstead of Twitch Film wrote that the film "comes across as a film for women," and "Most of the female characters are shallow and vapid. Similarly to SEX AND THE CITY, the women in this film preach about the strength of the female sex and how the female will never be complete until they find their male counterpart."

A review in JapanCinema stated "The story doesn't exactly venture into unexpected territory, but there are lots of little animated scenes and other embellishments that make this more charming and imaginative than the run-of-the-mill movies in the genre being churned out today." It called the movie "a fairly entertaining example of the genre no matter where the audience lives."

== Awards and nominations ==
2011 China HuaDing Film Awards

- Won: Best Supporting Actress (Ruby Lin)

2010 China Student Film Awards

- Won : Most popular Actress (Zhang Zi Yi)

2010 Guangzhou Student Film Festival

- Won : Special Prize from critics
- Nom : Best Film
- Nom : Best Director
- Nom : Best Actress (Zhang Zi Yi)
- Nom : Best Supporting Actress (Fan Bing Bing)

2010 Next Generation Director Awards

- Won : Best New Director (Eva Jin)

2010 China Film Media Awards

- Won : Best New Director (Eve Jin)

== Prequel ==
A prequel titled My Lucky Star starring Zhang Ziyi and Wang Leehom was produced in 2013. The film was directed by Dennie Gordon who became the first American woman to direct a feature for the Chinese market. Zhang reprises her lead role as Sophie, who embarks on a romantic adventure from Beijing to Singapore to Hong Kong to Macau.
