= Three-section staff =

Chinese weapon

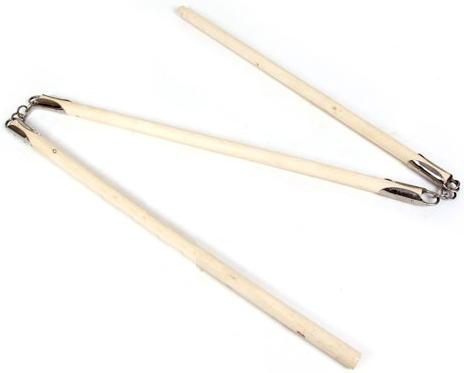
Three-section staff

The three-section staff, three-part staff, triple staff, originally sanjiegun (Chinese: 三節棍; pinyin: sānjiégùn; Jyutping: saam1 zit3 gwan3) or sansetsukon (Japanese: さんせつこん), three-section whip, originally sanjiebian (Chinese: 三節鞭; pinyin: sānjiébiān; Jyutping: saam1 zit3 bin1), is a Chinese flail weapon that consists of three wooden or metal staves connected by metal rings or rope. The weapon is also known as the coiling dragon staff, originally panlong gun (Chinese: 蟠龍棍; pinyin: pánlónggùn; Jyutping: faan4 lung4 gwan3). A more complicated version of the two section staff, the staves can be spun to gather momentum resulting in a powerful strike, or their articulation can be used to strike over or around a shield or other defense.

== History and use ==
Although there is no historical evidence to support it, a popular modern-day legend states the weapon was made famous by Zhao Kuangyin, the first emperor of the Song dynasty (960 AD).

Historically made of white oak, waxwood, or Chinese red maple, modern staves are constructed from rattan, bamboo, various hardwoods or aluminum. For optimum fit, each of the three sticks should be about the length of the combatant's arm (usually 60 centimetres (24 in) to 70 centimetres (28 in)) and have a combined diameter that easily fits in the hand (usually about 1.25 inches (32 mm)). These are connected by chains of rings (usually of 5 inches (130 mm)); modern versions use ball-and-socket joints.

The total length of the weapon is about the same as the Chinese staff (the gùn), and greater than that of the single staff (known in Japanese as a bō). The larger size of a three-section staff allows for an increased reach compared to the staff. Some of the techniques are similar to that of the staff, so spinning moves over the head and behind the back, such as helicopter spins and neck rolls, can be practised with a regular staff. Other weapon techniques the three-section staff makes use of are similar to that of the pair of sticks used in escrima, a simple short chain, a whip, or the two-section staff. It is therefore advantageous for the user to have some familiarity with these weapons. The three-section staff has the advantage of being usable as a long-range (whip), mid-range (flail or two section staff) or a short-range (pair of escrima) weapon. Acting as an extension of the user's arms, the three-section staff can strike, flail, block, choke, trap, disarm and whip, often with different sections of the staff acting at the same time. The chains or binding ropes of the staff are used to entangle an opponent and their weapons. While it has three ranges, the three-section staff is best used as a short range weapon against longer-ranged weapons. In this configuration, a skilled practitioner can nearly simultaneously block an opponent's strike, trap his or her weapon, and disarm them while executing their own strike with the free end of the staff.

While some martial artists have held that the three-section staff was used on the battlefield to entangle horses' legs or to strike around shields, the complexity of the weapon and the length, difficulty of use, lack of sharp tips or edges and other advantages of such traditional battlefield weapons as spears, polearms (such as the yan yue dao), swords and so forth meant that the triple staff was more likely restricted to personal self-defense.

One significant weakness of chained weapons in general is a lack of control. At long and intermediate ranges, the strike of one ends not upon impact but on recoil; even the greatest martial arts masters must use valuable time regaining control of their weapon. Due to the length of the staff sections relative to the length of joining chains, the weapon suffers less from a lack of control than other more flexible chain weapons. In short range mode there are no control issues because the end sections are firmly in hand, and the middle section is unable to move independently. Training with the three-section staff is particularly difficult because it is a multi-mode complex weapon, and is not recommended for beginners. Foam covered versions are now sold to aid in training, but the blows received from the ends on recoil are a relatively rare risk. Instead, the greater danger is the painful impact of the chains or metal parts of the staff that the chains are anchored to upon the hands of the user. This occurs when the staff is improperly used in short range mode and the relative positions of staff sections are rapidly changed, serving as a strong deterrent to casual users. However, motivated self teachers will find the three-section staff and other flexible weapons to be the easiest to learn effectively. This is because flexible weapons provide instant feedback to the user. When used improperly, flexible weapons will either impact upon targets other than those desired, put the user off balance, injure the user, or otherwise be obviously out of control.

To experience the versatility of both single-staff and three-section staff, some manufactures have created a combination weapon made out of metal. The three sections, linked by chains as customary for this type of weapon, screw together to form one single staff. The transition to full staff to sectioned staff can be done in mid-combat with a few twists. Against an opponent, the transition is often masked, adding an element of surprise to the following attacks.

The ends of three-section staves sometimes break, but can be replaced with pieces of similar weight and thickness to the other parts.

The three-section staff was brought to Okinawa from Fujian Province by Shinko Matayoshi, who incorporated it in Matayoshi Kobudo with two kata (sansetsukon dai ichi, sansetsukon dai ni) after 1935. Kobudo sansetsukon typically have shorter (usually 50–60 centimetres (20–24 in)) yet thicker (about 4–5 centimetres (1.6–2.0 in) in diameter) staves. The sansetsukon is not to be confused with san bon nunchaku (三本ヌンチャク).

== Three-section flails ==
- Lian zhu shuang tie bian (連珠雙鐵鞭, lit. 'linked bead double iron whip') is a variant of two-section staff (tie lian jia bang 鐵鏈夾棒, lit. 'iron chain with clubs') flail that has two connected striking ends. It could be an early predecessor of the three-section staff.
- Double-headed flail (連珠棍 lang ya lien | langyalian) has long center staff and a shorter flail head on each end.

== In popular culture ==
- Li Long wields three-section staves in European versions of Soul Edge due to BBFC guidelines at the time banning depictions of his usual weapon, nunchaku.
- In the mobile games Shadow Fight 3 and Shadow Fight 4: Arena, many variations of the three-section staff can be used and have a "shadow ability' called Whirlwind.
- San Te, character played by Gordon Liu, invents the three-section staff in The 36th Chamber of Shaolin.
- The three-section staff is one of Ling Tong's primary weapons in the Dynasty Warriors series.
- Hideyoshi Toyotomi uses the three-section staff as his main weapon in the Samurai Warriors series.
- Kento Rei Faun from Yoroiden Samurai Troopers uses a special one called the Kongo Tsue, which has spikes on one end and a naginata-style blade on the other. Its connecting chains can extend as well.
- In the webcomic Homestuck, the character Terezi at one point uses the staff as a weapon of choice, with its alternative title of "Dragon Staff" referring to the character having the dragon as a recurring theme.
- In Bleach, Ikkaku Madarame's sword has the supernatural ability to transform into either a spear or a bladed three-section staff and rapidly switch between both forms.
- The 2003 version of Teenage Mutant Ninja Turtles features three-section staves; one used by one of the Triceraton All-Stars, one by a warrior on the Battle Nexus Tournament, and a mystical one used by Mikey during the war with the Tengu Shredder.
- The DC Comics TV series Arrow on the CW features the use of the weapon in episodes 2 ("The Candidate") and 10 ("Blood Debts") of its 4th season, by villain Anarky during fight sequences against the Green Arrow and Speedy.
- In the manga The Seven Deadly Sins, the character Ban uses a three-sectioned staff to fight, although his preferred (but lost) weapon is a four-sectioned staff.
- In Suikoden II, Nanami fights with a sansetsukon.
- In Suikoden V, the hero Freyjadour Falenas fights with a hybrid weapon, which can become a long staff or a sansetsukon.
- In Saiyuki, Son Goku can have his Nyoibo (magic staff) become a sansetsukon, which he uses on rare occasions.
- In Shin Megami Tensei, the Sansetsukon can be bought early on in the story. Its low attack is compensated by its accuracy and its ability to strike three times in a row.
- In the 2006 movie Fearless, the protagonist Huo Yuanjia wields a three-section staff against the Japanese champion Tanaka, who wields a katana.
- In the Super Sentai series Juken Sentai Gekiranger and its Power Rangers counterpart Power Rangers Jungle Fury, a three-section staff known as the Gekisetsukon/Jungle Setsukon is employed by GekiTouja/Jungle Pride Megazord.
- In the Fatal Fury and The King of Fighters series, Billy Kane wields a bō that can become a sansetsukon.
- In the arcade game Martial Champion, Goldor wields a three-section staff.
- One of the weapons of the Libra cloth in Saint Seiya is a pair of sansetsukon.
- In the manga B't X, the character Karen uses a sansetsukon as a weapon.
- In Devil May Cry 3: Dante's Awakening, Cerberus transforms into the three-section staff with an ice magic type. In Devil May Cry 5, defeating King Cerberus rewards Dante with an largely upgraded replacement of the original Cerberus weapon. King Cerberus comes with three different magic types which decides a different form (i.e., Fire shifts into a bo staff, Ice maintains its three stick sanhokon nunchaku form by default, and Lightning magically changes into a three-section staff.)
- In the otome game Shall We Date?: Ninja Shadow, Tsubaki Kusunoki's preferred weapon is a sansetsukon. The characters note how this makes him unpredictable on the battlefield.
- In Final Fantasy XIII and Lightning Returns: Final Fantasy XIII, the character Oerba Yun Fang wields dual-bladed spears that transform into three-section staves.
- In Jackie Chan Adventures, Gan, one of Daolon Wong's Dark Chi Warriors, uses a three-section staff. Because they share the same chi, Gan can manipulate the weapon and telekinetically return it to his hand.
- In Jujutsu Kaisen, a three-section staff named "Playful Cloud" is a special-grade cursed tool used throughout the series by Megumi Fushiguro, Aoi Todo, Toji Fushiguro, Maki Zenin, and Suguru Geto.
- In Sakamoto Days, the character Satoru Yotsumura uses a bladed three-section staff.
- In Sifu, one of the five bosses, Kuroki, fights with a three-section staff with blades fitted at their ends.
- In Mortal Kombat 1, the character Tanya, unlike her original form, wields a three-section staff, which can be transformed and used as a baton, javelin or whip.
- In Zenless Zone Zero, the playable Agent character Qingyi fights with a three-section staff that is a modified Public Security riot baton.
- In the Sega Saturn game Last Bronx, playable fighter Yusaku Kudo wields a three-section staff as his signature weapon.
