= Matayoshi =

Matayoshi (written: 又吉) is a Japanese surname. Notable people with the surname include:

- Eiki Matayoshi (又吉 栄喜, born 1947), Japanese writer
- Herbert Matayoshi (1928–2011), American politician and businessman
- James Matayoshi (born 1968), American anti–nuclear power activist
- Katsuki Matayoshi (又吉 克樹, born 1990), Japanese baseball player
- Mitsuo Matayoshi (又吉 光雄, born 1944), Japanese activist
- Naoki Matayoshi (又吉 直樹, born 1980), Japanese novelist and comedian
- Shinko Matayoshi (又吉 眞光, 1888–1947), Okinawan martial artist
- Shinpo Matayoshi (又吉 眞豊, 1921–1997), Okinawan martial artist
