= Matayoshi Kobudo =

Style of Okinawan Kobudo (martial art)

- Focus: Weaponry
- Country of origin: Okinawa Prefecture, Japan
- Creator: Matayoshi Shinpo

Matayoshi Kobudo is a general term referring to the style of Okinawan Kobudo that was developed by Matayoshi Shinpo (又吉眞豊) and Matayoshi Shinko (又吉眞光) during the twentieth century. Martial arts have been practiced by the Matayoshi family for over nine generations and draw influence from Japanese, Chinese, and indigenous Okinawan martial arts styles.

== History ==
In the early 20th century Matayoshi Shinko 又吉眞光 was asked to demonstrate Kobudo to the Japanese emperor. He did this twice alongside the likes of Chojun Miyagi and Gichin Funakoshi, who demonstrated karate.

Following the death of Matayoshi Shinko in 1947, his son Shinpo, continued his father's legacy by teaching kobudo. Matayoshi Shinpo started a dojo in the 1970s in memory of his father and called it the Kodokan 光道館. From the Kodokan he taught a wide variety of traditional weapons associated with Okinawan peasants. In 1972, Matayoshi Sensei created the Zen Okinawan Kobudo Renmei as an organisation dedicated to the teaching and studying of Okinawa Kobudo. Following the death of Shinpo Matayoshi in 1997, Matayoshi Kobudo practitioners now find themselves split into different organisations.

According to the cited source, Matayoshi Kobudo has been taught internationally by Matayoshi Shinpo and his students. The source estimates that approximately 2,000 dojos practice the style worldwide.

== Weapons and kata ==
- Bō (6 ft Staff) - Shushi no kun, Choun no kun, Sakugawa no kun, Tsuken (Chikin) no kun, Shishi no kun,
- Sai (Small Trident) - Matayoshi No Sai Dai Ichi (Nicho Sai), Matayoshi No Sai Dai Ni (Sancho Sai), Shinbaru no sai
- Tunkuwa (sometimes called Tonfa) (Wooden Side handled Batton) - Matayoshi No Tunkuwa Dai Ichi, Matayoshi No Tunkuwa Dai Ni
- Nunchaku (Threshing short staff) - Nunchaku No Kata
- Sansetsukon (Three Sectional Staff) - Sansetsukun No Kata Ichi and Ni
- Eku (Boat Oar) - Chikin Akachu No Eku Di
- Nunti-Bo (Spear) - NuntiBo No Kata
- Tinbei+Seiryuto (Shield+short sword) - Timbei No Kata
- Kama (Short sickles) - Kama Nu Ti
- Suruchin (Weighted rope / Chain) - Suruchin No Kata
- Kuwa (Hoe) - Kuwa Nu Ti
- Jo (Stick) - Jojutsu no kata
- Tekko (brass knuckles) - Tekko no kata
- Tecchyu (iron cylinder) - Tecchyu no kata
- KurumanBo (asymmetrical jointed stick) - KurumanBo no kata

== Matayoshi Soke lineage ==
The Matayoshi Family Home is above the Kodokan dojo in Naha Okinawa. Matayoshi Yasushi (the only son of Shinpo) is the spiritual head of the Kodokan as appointed by his father but he has never practiced Matayoshi Kobudo. At the time of his death, Matayoshi Sensei's next in line for technical competence was Yoshiaki Gakiya.

Family lineage:

19th century

- Shingin Matayoshi
- Shintoku Matayoshi
- Shinchin Matayoshi
- Shinko Matayoshi (1888-1947)

20th century

- Shinko Matayoshi (1888-1947)
- Shinpo Matayoshi (1921-1997)
- Yasushi Matayoshi (present day)

21st century

- Yasushi Matayoshi (present day)

Tha Matayoshi Kobudo Headquarters is in Naha, Okinawa.

== Matayoshi Lineage Associations ==
Dojos operating under the All Okinawa Kobudo Federation (zen okinawa kobudo renmei, founded by Matayoshi Shinpo) :

- Maeshiro Shusei, only one to receive the 10th dan from Shinpo Matayoshi
- Ryuseikan, of Kinjo Kenichi
- Gibo Dojo, Gibo Seiki
- Azuma Shunji
- Miyagi Koki
- Taira Yoshio
- Takushi Seiki

Official branches of the Kodokan honbu dojo:

- Osaka Sakai Shureikan, Murayama Seitetsu
- Kodokan Nagoya Shibu, Ishido Hidehiko
- Hayasaka Yoshifumi (Tokyo area)
- Kodokan Nishinomiya Shibu, Raymundo Veliz (Hyogo)

Former students of Master Matayoshi, who have split voluntarily or were expelled after 1997 :

- Seisho Itokazu: Matayoshi Kobudo Shinbukai
- Yoshiyaki Gakiya, now Neil Stolsmark: Okinawa Kobudo Doushi Rensei-kai (co-founder was Josei Yogi)
- Josei Yogi: Okinawa Kobudo Renseikai
- Ryukyu Kobudo shureikan: Shusei Maeshiro (in association with Tsuneo Shimabukuro)
- Mikio Nishiuchi: International Okinawa Kobudo Association USA
- Nippon Budo Club, Seisuke Adaniya
- Komesu Yamashiro dojo, Kenichi Yamashiro (originally Kodokan Komesu shibu)
- Kobudo Shurei no kuni, Hidetada Ishiki (in association with Kenichi Yamashiro)
- Kamura Koshin (Naha)

Former students of Master Matayoshi, who have split voluntarily or were expelled before 1997 :

- Tetsuhiro Hokama: Kenshikai Karatedo Kobudo Association
- Takashi Kinjo: Okinawa Budo Kokusai Renmei and the Okinawa Kobukai
- Kenyu Chinen: World Oshu-Kai Dento Okinawa Shorin-Ryu Karate Do Kobudo Federation
- Zenei Oshiro: Academie Internationale de kobudo d'Okinawa

Matayoshi Shinpo's sensei Foreigners students:

- Kimo Wall (1943-2018): Okinawa Kodokan
- Andrea Guarelli (1961): International Matayoshi kobudo Association

== Bibliography ==
- Kenyu Chinen, Kobudo d'Okinawa
- Andrea Guarelli, Okinawan Kobudo: The History, Tools, and Techniques of the Ancient Martial Art
- Zenei Oshiro, Kobudo d'Okinawa: Bo et Tonfa
