= Zen Okinawan Kobudo Renmei =

The Zen Okinawa Kobudo Renmei (全沖縄古武道道連盟) ("All-Okinawa Kobudo Federation") is a martial arts organisation that began in Okinawa in 1972, and promotes the martial arts of two experts, father Matayoshi Shinko and son Matayoshi Shinpo.

From a young age, Shinko Matayoshi started to learn to use certain weapons, such as the Sai, Eku, Bo, and Kama through various teachers. They were Gushikawa Teragua, Yamane Chinen, Shishi Ryoko, and his father, Shinchin Matayoshi. Later, he learned to use Nunchaku and Tonfa, from Irai. In 1915, Matayoshi performed before the Emperor of Japan in Tokyo, along with other great martial artists. Later, in 1921, Matayoshi performed in another exhibition, this time in Okinawa, to the then Prince Hirohito.

Matayoshi Shinko later travelled to China to learn the arts of new weapons, such as the Sansetsukon, the Timbei/Seiryuto, Suruchin and Nunti. Alongside these, he also learned other Chinese arts such as traditional medicine, acupuncture, and Kung Fu from a Chinese teacher called Master Kingai. Matayoshi also learned the art of riding (Bajutsu), throwing knives (Shurikenjutsu) and binding with ropes (Negenawajutsu) while he was living with honghuzi ("bandits" on the China–Russia border).

When he returned to Okinawa in 1934, settling in the city of Naha, he taught his knowledge of weapons to his son, Shinpo Matayoshi.

Before the time of Shinko Matayoshi, peoples of Okinawa and China generally used to learn how to use different weapons in separation, since each weapon was treated as a martial art in itself (ie, there was no Kobudo, but the Sai art, Saijutsu; Bo art, Bojutsu, etc.). Matayoshi Shinko and Moden Son Yabiku (the creator of Ryukyu school Kobujutsu Kenkyu Kai) pooled their own knowledge of the various weapons, and Yabiku Moden ensures that this new art, of Kobudo or Kobujutsu, was known outside its existing boundaries. Matayoshi Shinko did not bother to popularize his knowledge, primarily transmitting his martial arts to his son and only child, Shinpo Matayoshi.

After the death of Shinko Matayoshi in 1947, Matayoshi Shinpo created the Ryukyu Kobudo Federation in 1970, which would be renamed in 1972 the "Zen Okinawa Kobudo Renmei" (All Okinawa Kobudo Federation). Matayoshi Shinpo undertook several worldwide journeys to teach and popularize the art of Kobudo that his father taught him, and as a result, the Zen Okinawa Kobudo Renmei is represented in many countries today. The Renmei became large and inclusive and celebrated the attitude of Matayoshi Shinpo who believed that Kobudo should be shared and enjoyed throughout the world.

Shinpo Matayoshi died in 1997, and the Zen Okinawa Kobudo Renmei continues under the leadership of his former student Shoshin Miyahira (2nd president), than Koki Miyagi (3rd president) and Yoshio Taira (4th president).
