= Return to the 36th Chamber =

1980 Hong Kong film by Lau Kar-leung

- The Hong Kong film poster
- Directed by: Lau Kar-leung
- Written by: Ni Kuang
- Produced by: Mona Fong; Run Run Shaw
- Starring: Gordon Liu
- Cinematography: Peter Ngor
- Edited by: Lee Yim-Hoi; Chiang Hsing-Lung
- Music by: Eddie Wang
- Distributed by: Shaw Brothers Studio
- Release date: 24 August 1980 (Hong Kong)
- Running time: 101 minutes
- Countries: Hong Kong; China
- Languages: Cantonese; Mandarin

Return to the 36th Chamber (Chinese: 少林搭棚大師; pinyin: Shao Lin ta peng hsiao tzu; lit. 'Return of the Master Killer' or 'Master Killer II') is a 1980 Shaw Brothers Studio Hong Kong martial arts comedy film starring Gordon Liu. It was directed by Lau Kar-leung and written by Ni Kuang. The film is the second in a loosely connected trilogy, following The 36th Chamber of Shaolin (1978) and preceding Disciples of the 36th Chamber (1985). In the first and third films in the series, Liu portrays the Shaolin monk San Te, but in Return, he portrays an imposter monk.

== Plot ==
The story opens at a fabric dyeing mill. The quality of the dyes has noticeably worsened, and the factory owner, Wang, and his subordinate chief, Boss Wa, decide to hire some Manchu overseers to improve the work. Wang decides to cut the workers' salary to pay the mercenaries, and when the workers protest they are viciously thrashed.

When sitting in a tea house discussing their problems, the workers are joined by Chu Jen-chieh, a good-hearted small-time con man and the foreman's younger brother who is posing as a monk. He offers to help, but since he cannot actually do kung fu, he and the foreman's assistant, Ah Chao, devise a plan to trick the Manchu into reinstating the full salary pay, with Jen-chieh posing as the Shaolin's head abbot of 36th Chamber, San Te.

At first the scheme works, but Wang quickly works out that this man is an impostor, and has him driven away and his Manchu hirelings retaliate against the workers. Feeling guilty about what has happened, Jen-chieh leaves and heads for the Shaolin temple to learn the real fighting arts. His first attempts to enter by stealth are thwarted by the vigilant monks and his own bumbling, but eventually he manages to sneak his way in, just to run into the real San Te. He, too, realizes that Jen-chieh is not what he claims to be, but he announces that he wants to give him a chance: Jen-chieh is to build a set of scaffolds all around the temple and renovate the entire complex.

Somewhat reluctantly, Jen-chieh goes to work, but he is constantly distracted by the monks practicing martial arts in the 36th Chamber, which he can overlook from his high vantage point. Eventually, he begins to train himself in kung fu by using the conditions of his assignment to improvise training facilities. However, this causes him to lag behind in his work, and it takes him more than a year to finish the gantry. As soon as Jen-chieh announces that he is finished, San Te wants him to dismantle the structure and leave the monastery. Rebelling against this decision, Jen-chieh lands himself inside the chamber, and while trying to evade the abbot chasing him, he inadvertently manages to pass all hazards set in the chamber with ease. San Te finally corners him and forces him to leave, with a strange smile on his lips.

Jen-chieh returns to town to find that the conditions of the workers have worsened: their salary has been cut by nearly half, and any who have protested had been laid off to eke out a meager existence. Elated by his return, some of the ex-workers begin to pester Jen-chieh with their high expectations, which leads to Jen-chieh instinctively and to his own surprise fighting them off with his newly acquired kung fu skills. The next morning, Jen-chieh appears at the dye mill and thrashes the overseers, using bamboo fibers (like the ones he used when building the scaffolds) to tie them up and incapacitate them, introducing his style as "scaffolding kung fu". (Note: Sometimes also dubbed "rooftop kung fu")

Once the overseers are dealt with, Wang and his bodyguards appear at the scene. Jen-chieh lures them out of the city to a mansion under construction, where he uses the building equipment and the tight quarters to his advantage. Finally overpowering Wang, he forces him to pay his workers their full wages again. Wang admits defeat, and Jen-chieh continues his training on the half-finished grounds.

== Cast ==
- Gordon Liu as Chu Jen-chieh
- Kara Hui as Hsiao Hung
- Hsiao Ho as Ah Chao
- Wong Ching-ho as Uncle Li
- Wa Lun as Chou Sheng
- Lee King-chue as Abbot San Te
- Chan Si-gaai as Ah Fen
- Kwan Yung-moon as Chuan Min
- Yeung Jing-jing as Hsiao Ting
- Johnny Wang Lung-wei as Huang Kao-feng
- John Ting as Chief Ma
- Chang Yi-tao as Yuen Li-hou
