= List of Jujutsu Kaisen characters =

Characters of the series. From left to right: Maki Zen'in, Megumi Fushiguro, Nobara Kugisaki (first row), Dagon (bottom left), Yuji Itadori, Panda, Toge Inumaki (second row), Choso, Kenjaku (possessing Suguru Geto's body), Jogo, Mahito (third row) and Ryomen Sukuna (back)

The main cast of Jujutsu Kaisen 0. From left to right: Suguru Geto, Panda (below), Toge Inumaki (top), Maki Zen'in (center), Satoru Gojo, Yuta Okkotsu, and Rika Orimoto (back); their designs were revised for the main series

The manga series Jujutsu Kaisen features an extensive cast of characters created by Gege Akutami.

== Concept and creation ==
Jujutsu Kaisen originated from author Gege Akutami's four-chapter series Tokyo Metropolitan Curse Technical School, which was later retitled Jujutsu Kaisen 0. The initial design of Yuta Okkotsu was similar to that of Megumi Fushiguro, another Jujutsu Sorcerer, in the main series. Consequently, Akutami altered Yuta's appearance for the main series. When creating Jujutsu Kaisen, Akutami created a new character, Yuji Itadori, for the leading role, while Yuta became a supporting character. Similarities between Yuta and Itadori include their introduction to Jujutsu, experiences with tragedy, naivety, and having faced death. Despite their similarities, Itadori is characterized by an outgoing demeanor, while Okkotsu is comparatively reserved.

Regarding the process of character creation, Akutami claimed that characters must fall within the canons of shōnen manga to capture readers' attention. Yuji is largely inspired by the older brother of Akutami, described as the author's opposite for having succeeded in both sports and academics. Akutami stated that the message of Jujutsu Kaisen is that nobody possesses absolute truth, not the "good guys" nor the "bad guys", and if nobody is right, then nobody is wrong either, with each character acting according to their own ethics. The Sensui arc of YuYu Hakusho inspired Akutami to create evil characters with the goal of eradicating humanity, for whom readers might nevertheless feel a certain empathy. Akutami commented that, regarding the story elements and the three main characters, Nobara Kugisaki "practically writes herself." For Chapter 9, Akutami provided Megumi with a line about an "unfair life" to develop his character. Akutami commented that this was "a lesson that there are some things you can only grasp once you actually have a character say lines in your manuscript", and added that Megumi "unintentionally" ended up being similar to Osamu Mikumo from World Trigger. Akutami also expressed regrets over the handling of Junpei Yoshino and his story arc.

With Sukuna and Mahito, Akutami wanted to avoid the typical "deep down they are good" idea, stating that they are intrinsically evil beings who enjoy making humans suffer, but Akutami noted that it cannot be proved that they are wrong, adding that Mahito was like Thanos in Avengers: Endgame, as Akutami never felt hatred for him. For some characters, like Panda and Toge Inumaki, Akutami first created their visual aspects, while the character of Satoru Gojo came from an idea representing the paroxysm of force. Sukuna was Akutami's first favorite character due to a design influenced by everything Akutami had read, but Kento Nanami was the first character properly created and developed by Akutami, making Nanami the author's later favorite character.

== Tokyo Prefectural Jujutsu High School ==
=== Students ===
==== Yuji Itadori ====
Voiced by: Junya Enoki (Japanese); Adam McArthur (English)

Yuji Itadori (虎杖 悠仁, Itadori Yūji) is a high school student who inadvertently becomes the vessel for the powerful Curse Ryomen Sukuna (両面 宿儺) after consuming one of his fingers to protect his friends. Recruited by Satoru Gojo, he enrolls at Tokyo Jujutsu High under a suspended death sentence, tasked with collecting Sukuna's remaining fingers. Yuji trains under Kento Nanami and befriends Aoi Todo, mastering Black Flash (黒閃, Kokusen). During the Shibuya Incident, Sukuna briefly takes control, massacring civilians before Yuji regains dominance. He later defeats Mahito with Todo's aid, but Sukuna eventually transfers into Megumi Fushiguro's body. Yuji awakens Blood Manipulation (赤血 操術, Sekketsu Sōjutsu) and the Shrine (御廚子, Mizushi) of Sukuna, as well. Alongside allies, he weakens Sukuna until Megumi resists from within. A final Black Flash ends the battle. Sixty-eight years later, he is considered humanity's strongest Jujutsu Sorcerer, and his whereabouts are unknown.

==== Megumi Fushiguro ====
Voiced by: Yuma Uchida, Natsumi Fujiwara (young) (Japanese); Robbie Daymond (English)

Megumi Fushiguro (伏黒 恵, Fushiguro Megumi) is a first-year student at Tokyo Jujutsu High, trained by Satoru Gojo. He encounters Yuji Itadori while retrieving a cursed object and later advocates sparing Yuji after Sukuna's possession. As a descendant of the Zen'in clan, Megumi wields the Ten Shadows Technique (十種影法術, Tokusa no Kage Bōjutsu), summoning shikigami (式神) from shadows to exorcise Curses. His potential earns recognition from Sukuna and others, though Gojo prevents his adoption by the Zen'in. During missions, he develops an incomplete Chimera Shadow Garden (嵌合 暗翳庭, Kangō An'eitei), a Domain Expansion that enhances his shikigami. After Naobito Zen'in's death, Megumi is named clan head. In the Culling Games, he fights to save his sister Tsumiki, only for Sukuna to possess him after Yorozu's defeat. Sukuna exploits Megumi's despair, using Mahoraga to kill Tsumiki. During Gojo's battle with Sukuna, Megumi endures Infinite Void's effects. Though initially unresponsive, he later resists Sukuna's control after Yuji's intervention.

==== Nobara Kugisaki ====
Voiced by: Asami Seto (Japanese); Anne Yatco (English)

Nobara Kugisaki (釘崎 野薔薇, Kugisaki Nobara) is a first-year student at Tokyo Jujutsu High, trained by Satoru Gojo. She wields the Straw Doll Technique (芻霊呪法, Sūrei Juhō), attacking with nails and a hammer to channel two primary abilities: Resonance (共鳴, Tomonari), which links her strikes to a target's body or soul, and Hairpin (簪, Kanzashi), which detonates her nails with Cursed Energy. Originally from a rural village, she left to escape its oppressive environment. Partnered with Yuji and Megumi, she defeats the Death Painting brothers Eso and Kechizu. During the Shibuya Incident, Mahito gravely wounds her, leaving her comatose until the Shinjuku Showdown, where she assists Yuji's final attack on Sukuna with Resonance.

==== Maki Zen'in ====
Voiced by: Mikako Komatsu (Japanese); Allegra Clark (English)

Maki Zen'in (禪院 真希, Zen'in Maki) is a second-year student at Tokyo Jujutsu High. Born into the Zen'in clan without Cursed Energy, she compensates with superhuman physical abilities granted by her Heavenly Restriction (天与呪縛, Ten'yo Jubaku), requiring special glasses to perceive Curses. After leaving her clan's oppressive hierarchy, she becomes a skilled combatant using cursed tools. During the Shibuya Incident, she fights alongside Naobito Zen'in and Kento Nanami against Dagon. Following her twin sister Mai's death, Maki destroys the Zen'in clan and claims their armory, gaining the Split Soul Katana. In the Culling Games, she reaches her full potential while battling Naoya's Cursed Spirit. Later, she joins the fight against Sukuna, surviving multiple lethal attacks before being rescued by allies.

==== Toge Inumaki ====
Voiced by: Koki Uchiyama (Japanese); Xander Mobus (English)

Toge Inumaki (狗巻 棘, Inumaki Toge) is a second-year student at Tokyo Prefectural Jujutsu High School who takes part in the Sister School Exchange Event alongside Maki and Panda. Inumaki's Cursed Technique is Cursed Speech (呪言, Jugon). He keeps his mouth covered and speaks only in various ingredients of rice balls. This is due to his cursed power concentrated in his voice, creating various effects against Curses depending on how he speaks and uses his words. During the Shibuya Incident, he is accidentally caught in Sukuna's Domain Expansion while trying to save the residents trapped in the area and loses his left arm. Following Gojo's release, he reunites with his friend Yuta. During the battle against Sukuna in Shinjuku, he records himself using Cursed Speech and Yuta uses the recorder to stall Sukuna's movements, though Inumaki still suffers the feedback of his technique.

==== Panda ====
Voiced by: Tomokazu Seki (Japanese); Matthew David Rudd (English)

Panda (パンダ) is a sentient Cursed Corpse and second-year student at Tokyo Jujutsu High, created by principal Masamichi Yaga. Unlike typical Cursed Corpses, Panda possesses three interchangeable cores that alter his form and abilities between panda, gorilla, and triceratops modes. During the Sister School Exchange Event, he befriends Mechamaru after their match. Following Yaga's death, Panda participates in the Culling Games alongside Yuji and Megumi. He battles Hajime Kashimo, a reincarnated sorcerer from 400 years ago, who destroys two of his cores before Kinji Hakari intervenes. The damage reduces Panda to a smaller, cub-like form, though he survives the encounter.

==== Yuta Okkotsu ====
Voiced by: Megumi Ogata (Japanese); Kayleigh McKee (English)

Yuta Okkotsu (乙骨 憂太, Okkotsu Yūta) is a Special Grade sorcerer originally introduced in Jujutsu Kaisen 0. Initially haunted by his cursed childhood friend Rika Orimoto, he trains under Satoru Gojo at Jujutsu High, mastering his immense Cursed Energy. His Copy (模倣, Kopī) technique allows him to replicate others' abilities, while maintaining a weakened version of Rika as a shikigami. After defeating Suguru Geto and lifting Rika's curse, he studies abroad before returning as Yuji's potential executioner. During the Culling Games, he defeats powerful opponents like Ryu Ishigori and Uro while protecting civilians. He later assists in the battle against Sukuna, utilizing his Domain Expansion Authentic Mutual Love (真贋 相愛, Shingan Sōai) and copied techniques. Though nearly killed by Sukuna, he survives and briefly inhabits Gojo's body to unleash Hollow Purple against Sukuna's Domain.

==== Kinji Hakari ====
Voiced by: Kazuya Nakai (Japanese); Yuri Lowenthal (English)

Kinji Hakari (秤 金次, Hakari Kinji) is a suspended third-year at Tokyo Jujutsu High. He runs an underground Sorcerer fight club. Recognized by Gojo and Yuta as potentially surpassing them, he joins Megumi and Yuji to fight Kenjaku after learning of Gojo's sealing and Yaga's death. His innate technique manipulates pachinko machine parts, and his Domain Expansion, Idle Death Gamble (坐殺 博徒, Zasatsu Bakuto), creates a train station-like environment where hitting a jackpot (1/239 chance) grants him four minutes and eleven seconds of unlimited Cursed Energy, automatic healing, and unkillable status. Using this, he defeats Hajime Kashimo and later holds off Uraume during Sukuna's battle with Gojo.

==== Kirara Hoshi ====
Voiced by: Yuki Sakakihara (Japanese); Kayleigh McKee (English)

Kirara Hoshi (星 綺羅羅, Hoshi Kirara) is a third-year student at Tokyo Jujutsu High suspended for clashing with authority. While away from the school, Kirara has partnered with Hakari while running his fight club. Their Cursed Technique is Love Rendezvous (星間飛行, Rabu Randebū), a complex technique whose motif is based on the Southern Cross constellation. For someone marked with one star to approach someone marked with another star, they must follow a determined order, or else targets of the same star will attract each other. The order follows the stars from nearest to furthest distance to the Earth: Imai, Acrux, Mimosa, Ginan, and Gacrux. They agree to Megumi and Yuji's request for help, after hearing about everything that transpired at Shibuya and after. Kirara is later outside the barriers of the Culling Game serving as the provider of intel for one group.

=== Faculty and staff ===
==== Satoru Gojo ====
Voiced by: Yūichi Nakamura, Mariya Ise (young) (Japanese); Kaiji Tang, Cristina Vee (young) (English)

Satoru Gojo (五条 悟, Gojō Satoru) is a renowned Special Grade Jujutsu Sorcerer and teacher at Tokyo Jujutsu High, widely regarded as the world's strongest sorcerer. His abilities include the Six Eyes (六眼, Rikugan), which optimizes Cursed Energy usage, and the Limitless (無下限, Mukagen) technique, granting spatial manipulation at atomic levels. This encompasses Infinity (無限, Mugen) (near-impenetrable defense), Blue (蒼, Ao) (gravitational attraction), Red (赫, Aka) (repulsive force), and Hollow Purple (虚式 茈, Kyoshiki Murasaki) (annihilative energy). His Domain Expansion, Unlimited Void (無量空処, Muryōkūsho), overwhelms opponents with infinite sensory input. As Yuji Itadori's mentor, Gojo safeguards him to contain Sukuna. During the Shibuya Incident, he is sealed by Kenjaku after defeating multiple Special Grade curses. Released later, he duels Sukuna, overpowering the Ten Shadows technique before falling to Sukuna's perfected spatial slash. His body is temporarily utilized posthumously through Kenjaku's technique.

==== Kiyotaka Ijichi ====
Voiced by: Mitsuo Iwata (Japanese); Chris Tergliafera (English)

Kiyotaka Ijichi (伊地知 潔高, Ijichi Kiyotaka) is an assistant manager of Tokyo Prefectural Jujutsu High School. He can create curtains, a technique used to implement a barrier to separate an area from the outside. Nanami revealed that he was once training to be a combatant type of sorcerer, but because of Gojo's comments, he chose to become a manager instead. He is injured by Shigemo during the events at Shibuya, but Shoko saves him and the two of them later reunite with Gojo after he is unsealed.

==== Shoko Ieiri ====
Voiced by: Aya Endō (Japanese); Ryan Bartley (English)

Shoko Ieiri (家入 硝子, Ieiri Shoko) is a Jujutsu Sorcerer doctor at Tokyo Prefectural Jujutsu High School and former classmate of Satoru Gojo and Suguru Geto. She has proven to be quite a valuable resource, being one of the few people capable of healing others with the Reverse Cursed Technique (反転 術式, Hanten Jutsushiki). Shoko is a rather serious and somber person, wants nothing more than to get her job done, although she shares a long-standing friendship with fellow sorcerers Gojo and Utahime. Unlike the other sorcerers, she does not engage in combat. She usually examines dead bodies in the school morgue, since her ability to output positive energy is considered too valuable and rare to risk on dangerous missions. After Ijichi and Ino are severely injured by Curse Users in Shibuya, she saves their lives, as well as Megumi's following his bout with Shigemo. During the Shinjuku Showdown, she heals many of the combatants injured by Sukuna, with Arata and Amai's help. She also helps Yuta transplant his brain into Gojo's corpse with Kenjaku's technique.

==== Kento Nanami ====
Voiced by: Kenjiro Tsuda (Japanese); David Vincent (English)

Kento Nanami (七海 建人, Nanami Kento) is a methodical Grade 1 sorcerer who mentors Yuji Itadori after returning from a corporate career. His Ratio Technique (十劃 呪法, Tōkaku Juhō) creates weak points by dividing targets into 7:3 ratios, applicable to both living and non-living targets. Through his Overtime (時間外労働, Jikangairōdō) Binding Vow, his power increases when working beyond normal hours. A pragmatic contrast to Gojo's flamboyance, Nanami initially left Jujutsu society after his classmate Haibara's death before reluctantly returning. He forms a professional bond with Yuji during their investigation of Mahito, valuing the young sorcerer's growth. During the Shibuya Incident, Nanami suffers fatal burns from Jogo before being finished by Mahito. His Cursed Technique later manifests in his weapon, wielded by Ino against Sukuna.

==== Akari Nitta ====
Voiced by: Sora Tokui (Japanese); Sarah Anne Williams (English)

Akari Nitta (新田 明, Nitta Akari) is one of the managers working for Jujutsu High School. She was assigned to accompany the first-years in their mission to defeat the Yasohachi Bridge curse and during the Shibuya Incident, she is saved by Nobara and Nanami from Shigemo.

==== Atsuya Kusakabe ====
Voiced by: Shin-ichiro Miki (Japanese); Kirk Thornton (English)

Atsuya Kusakabe (日下部 篤也, Kusakabe Atsuya) is a Grade 1 sorcerer and faculty member at Tokyo Jujutsu High, specializing in swordsmanship despite lacking an innate technique. He mastered the New Shadow Style: Simple Domain (シン陰流・簡易領域, Shin Kageryū: Kan'i Ryōiki), an anti-Domain technique that neutralizes sure-hit effects. His sword techniques include Batto Sword Drawing (抜刀, Battō) for enhanced speed and Evening Moon Sword Drawing (居合・夕月, Iai Yūzuki), which combines Simple Domain with increased Cursed Energy output. Likely serving as mentor to Kasumi Miwa, who shares his skillset, Kusakabe initially distrusts Yuji Itadori after witnessing Sukuna's power in Shibuya but eventually joins the fight against Kenjaku and Sukuna. During the Shinjuku Showdown, his Simple Domain expertise proves effective against Sukuna before severe injuries force his retreat, rescued by Ui Ui and Miguel.

==== Masamichi Yaga ====
Voiced by: Takaya Kuroda (Japanese); Keith Silverstein (English)

Masamichi Yaga (夜蛾 正道, Yaga Masamichi) is the principal of Tokyo Jujutsu High and former mentor to Satoru Gojo, Suguru Geto, and Shoko Ieiri. His Cursed Corpse (呪骸, Juga) technique enables him to create and control sentient dolls, exemplified by his creation Panda. Though capable of producing an army of cursed corpses, Yaga keeps this potential secret from the Jujutsu higher-ups. He supports Gojo in protecting Yuji Itadori, accepting the student despite the risks. Following the Shibuya Incident, the higher-ups blame Yaga for the devastation and sentence him to death, which Yoshinobu Gakuganji executes.

== Kyoto Prefectural Jujutsu High School ==
=== Students ===
==== Aoi Todo ====
Voiced by: Subaru Kimura, Yuki Kazu (young) (Japanese); Xander Mobus (English)

Aoi Todo (東堂 葵, Tōdō Aoi) is a formidable third-year sorcerer from Kyoto Jujutsu High, renowned for his exceptional combat skills and unorthodox personality. His signature technique, Boogie Woogie (不義遊戯, Bugi Ugi), allows instantaneous spatial swapping through clapping. After losing an arm during the Shibuya Incident while aiding Yuji Itadori against Mahito, Todo ingeniously modifies his technique using a vibraslap attachment, enabling rapid multi-target swaps. During the Shinjuku Showdown, he plays a pivotal role—first assisting in Kenjaku's elimination, then supporting Yuji against Sukuna. His enhanced Boogie Woogie proves disruptive even to Sukuna, forcing the King of Curses to deploy his Domain Expansion. Todo's courageous interception of Sukuna's Black Flash to protect Angel earns Sukuna's begrudging respect before being incapacitated.

==== Mai Zen'in ====
Voiced by: Marina Inoue (Japanese); Laura Post (English)

Mai Zen'in (禪院 真依, Zen'in Mai) is a second-year Kyoto Jujutsu High sorcerer and Maki's estranged twin sister. Unlike Maki, Mai possesses a Construction (構築術式, Kōchiku Jutsushiki) technique that materializes objects from Cursed Energy, though her limited reserves make this exhausting. Primarily using a Cursed Energy-infused revolver, she keeps her technique secret for tactical advantage. Fatally wounded by their father during the Shibuya Incident, Mai expends her remaining energy to forge a replica of Toji Fushiguro's Split Soul Katana for Maki. This final act enables Maki's destruction of the Zen'in clan while serving as their last connection.

==== Kasumi Miwa ====
Voiced by: Chinatsu Akasaki (Japanese); Allegra Clark (English)

Kasumi Miwa (三輪 霞, Miwa Kasumi) is a Kyoto Jujutsu High student and swordswoman trained in New Shadow Style: Simple Domain (シン陰流・簡易領域, Shin Kageryū: Kan'i Ryōiki). She wields precise sword techniques within a 2.21-meter radius despite lacking an innate Cursed Technique. As Gakuganji's secretary, she pursues sorcery to support her siblings financially. During the Shibuya Incident, she mourns Kokichi Muta's death. In the Culling Games, she assists allies and rescues Maki Zen'in from Sukuna's Domain Expansion. A binding vow made during combat with Kenjaku permanently prevents her from using katanas. She later participates in the Shinjuku Showdown against Sukuna.

==== Kokichi Muta / Mechamaru ====
Voiced by: Yoshitsugu Matsuoka (Japanese); Keith Silverstein (English)

Kokichi Muta (与 幸吉, Muta Kōkichi) is a Kyoto Jujutsu High student with a Heavenly Restriction that grants immense Cursed Energy but leaves his body frail. His Puppet Manipulation (傀儡操術, Kairai Sōjutsu) technique controls robotic Ultimate Mechamaru (究極メカ丸, Arutimetto Mekamaru) puppets, which he uses for daily activities and combat. Initially betraying his peers by allying with Mahito to heal his condition, he later turns against the curses, fighting Mahito to a standstill before being killed. Posthumously, his puppets aid Yuji during the Shibuya Incident, redeeming his earlier betrayal.

==== Momo Nishimiya ====
Voiced by: Rie Kugimiya (Japanese); Tara Sands (English)

Momo Nishimiya (西宮 桃, Nishimiya Momo) is a third-year Sorcerer of Kyoto Prefectural Jujutsu High. She is a Semi-Grade 2 sorcerer, her Cursed Technique is Tool Manipulation (付喪 操術, Tsukumo Sōjutsu) which allows her to telekinetically levitate her broom, similar to those used by witches. Her role is supportive rather than offensive, as she uses her power to scout areas and collects information. As a third-year student, she looks out for her juniors and is especially close friends with Mai Zen'in. She becomes a player of the Culling Games and is located in Tokyo Colony No. 2.

==== Noritoshi Kamo ====
Voiced by: Satoshi Hino, Natsumi Kawaida (young) (Japanese); Landon McDonald (English)

Noritoshi Kamo (加茂 憲紀, Kamo Noritoshi) is a Kyoto Jujutsu High sorcerer who inherits the Kamo clan's Blood Manipulation (赤血操術, Sekketsu Sōjutsu) technique despite his illegitimate status. He specializes in blood-guided arrows. After Kenjaku assumes control of the Kamo clan, Noritoshi is exiled and joins the Culling Games. He assists Maki Zen'in against Naoya's Cursed Spirit, risking his life to buy her recovery time. Later, he helps train Yuji Itadori in blood techniques before withdrawing from the final conflicts to search for his family. His combat style combines traditional archery with precise blood manipulation.

==== Arata Nitta ====
Voiced by: Ryōta Asari (Japanese); Kylen Deporter (English)

Arata Nitta (新田 新, Nitta Arata) is the only first-year student of Kyoto Prefectural Jujutsu High. He is the younger brother of Akari Nitta. His Cursed Technique allows him to prevent injuries from getting worse, though he cannot heal. Unlike Shoko Ieiri, he can only stop bleeding and reduce pain. He is a sorcerer considered of great value that only he and Todo were sent for rescue in Shibuya. He and Amai also help Ieiri heal the sorcerers downed by Sukuna during the Shinjuku Showdown.

=== Faculty and staff ===
==== Yoshinobu Gakuganji ====
Voiced by: Mugihito (Japanese); Kyle Hebert (English)

Yoshinobu Gakuganji (楽巌寺 嘉伸, Gakuganji Yoshinobu) is the principal of Kyoto Prefectural Jujutsu High School and one of the elders pushing for Itadori's execution. He uses a guitar to fire off Cursed Energy by amplifying the melody he plays. After the events that transpire at Shibuya, he executes Masamichi Yaga, whom the elders blamed for the tragedy. He later uses his technique to amplify Gojo during his duel with Sukuna.

==== Utahime Iori ====
Voiced by: Yoko Hikasa (Japanese); Tara Sands (English)

Utahime Iori (庵 歌姫, Iori Utahime) is a Semi-Grade 1 sorcerer and Kyoto Jujutsu High instructor. Her Solo Forbidden Area (単独禁区, Soro Soro Kinku) technique amplifies allies' Cursed Energy through ritualistic performance, potentially boosting effectiveness by 120%. While typically composed, she harbors particular irritation toward Satoru Gojo due to his constant teasing. Despite this, she secretly collaborates with him to uncover the school mole, ultimately identifying Kokichi Muta. During the Shinjuku battle, her technique significantly enhances Gojo's combat capabilities.

== Other Jujutsu Sorcerers ==
=== Takuma Ino ===
Voiced by: Yū Hayashi (Japanese); Lucien Dodge (English)

Takuma Ino (猪野 琢真, Ino Takuma) is an alumnus of Jujutsu School and the protege of Nanami Kento. He is a Grade 2 sorcerer, waiting for his promotion to Grade 1. Ino looks up to Nanami as a role model and even got emotional when Nanami relies on him to take care of Itadori and Fushiguro. His Cursed Technique is Auspicious Beasts Summon (来訪瑞獣, Raihō Zuijū), which allows him, when his face is covered, to become a spiritual medium to summon the four Auspicious Beasts: Kaichi, Reiki, Kirin, and Ryu. He is eager to fight to prove his skills, but was incapacitated by Curse Users during the Shibuya Incident. During the Shinjuku Showdown, Ino participates in the group battle against Sukuna, using Nanami's cursed tool, which was imbued with his Ratio technique.

=== Mei Mei ===
Voiced by: Kotono Mitsuishi (Japanese); Amber Lee Connors (English)

Mei Mei (冥冥) is an alumnus of Jujutsu School. Her Cursed Technique is Black Bird Manipulation (黒鳥操術, Kokuchō Sōjutsu), which allows her to control and share her vision with crows. Knowing her technique is weak, she strove to become a powerful sorcerer and was able to become a grade 1 sorcerer for being a capable fighter. Her weapon of choice is a battle-axe. Mei Mei is known to have questionable morals and a materialistic personality, and she only cares about which side has more money which she openly admits. During Halloween in Shibuya, she and her brother Ui Ui run into Kenjaku after splitting from Itadori, and after dispatching a special grade Cursed Spirit called the Smallpox Deity, are forced to escape by Kenjaku. Mei Mei exchanges her fortune into foreign currency and lays low in Malaysia before eventually returning with her brother to eliminate Kenjaku and Sukuna.

=== Riko Amanai ===
Voiced by: Anna Nagase (Japanese); Reba Buhr (English)

Riko Amanai (天内 理子, Amanai Riko) is the Star Plasma Vessel that was targeted for assassination by many Curse Users in 2006. She was a young girl, as well as a non-combatant sorcerer, fated to become the new vessel for Tengen which she has fully embraced. Her protection was a critical mission assigned to Gojo and Geto. Towards the end, she admits she wanted to live her life more as a normal teenager to Geto instead of merging with Tengen. Moments later, Toji shot her in the head, instantly killing her and completing the assassination. Riko's death was one of the reasons that led Geto to become a Curse User, as the sight of him seeing dozens of non-sorcerers celebrating her death was traumatic for him. The consequences of Riko's death would emanate in the present day as Tengen, who has not merged with a Star Plasma Vessel which she was supposed to in 2006, has evolved into a non-human that could become an enemy of humanity. This course of events were orchestrated by Kenjaku and have led to the Culling Game.

=== Misato Kuroi ===
Voiced by: Risa Shimizu (Japanese); Jeannie Tirado (English)

Misato Kuroi (黒井 美里, Kuroi Misato) is the caretaker and mother-figure of Riko Amanai after her family was killed in an accident. She is mostly a non-combatant dressed like a maid, which surprises her opponents as she also is a sorcerer with capable fighting capabilities. She helped Gojo and Geto protect Riko until she became the new vessel for Tengen. However, she became stressed about everything related to Tengen. Toji later killed her, and her death was one of the reasons that led Suguru Geto to become a Curse User.

=== Yu Haibara ===
Voiced by: Gakuto Kajiwara (Japanese); Ryan Colt Levy (English)

Yu Haibara (灰原雄, Haibara Yu) is a student from Tokyo Metropolitan Curse Technical College. He was the only classmate and friend of Kento Nanami during his time as a Jujutsu Student until he was killed in action during a mission in 2007. In contrast to Nanami, he was a bubbly and energetic person. Geto mentioned that his friendliness could even lead him to danger. Haibara's death was one of the reasons that led Suguru Geto to become a Curse User. Haibara appeared once more to Nanami while he was about to die from Mahito's Idle Transfiguration in Shibuya.

=== Yuki Tsukumo ===
Voiced by: Noriko Hidaka (Japanese); Anjali Kunapaneni (English)

Yuki Tsukumo (九十九 由基, Tsukumo Yuki) is one of the four special grade sorcerers and a former Star Plasma Vessel. Her Cursed Technique is Star Rage (星の怒り(ボンバイエ), Bonbaie), which allows her to grant virtual mass to herself and her shikigami, Garuda (凰輪), which fights in conjunction with her. She was a mentor to Aoi Todo, who she scouted one day while traveling. She aims for a world with no Cursed Spirits, a belief that differs from Jujutsu School. Yuki has a habit of asking men she meets what type of girls they like, a habit Todo adopted. After the Shibuya Incident, she shows up to help, volunteering to guard Master Tengen. Towards the end of the Culling Games, when Kenjaku shows up to absorb Tengen, she and Choso go all-out to force Kenjaku to reveal their own Curse Technique and not rely on Geto's, though Tengen warns her not to use her own Domain Expansion against Kenjaku. After an arduous battle though, she succumbs to her injuries, but not without allowing Choso to escape with information on Kenjaku beforehand.

=== Ui Ui ===
Voiced by: Yūko Sanpei (Japanese); Sarah Anne Williams (English)

Ui Ui (憂憂) is a young sorcerer and Mei Mei's devoted younger brother. His Cursed Technique enables spatial teleportation of marked targets, including both physical bodies and souls. This ability served crucial roles during the Culling Games, facilitating: 1) transportation between colonies as Maki Zen'in's liaison, 2) evacuation of injured sorcerers during the Sukuna conflict, and 3) limited soul-swapping between consenting individuals (maximum twice monthly per person). Unlike Mahito's forced transformations, Ui Ui's soul transference preserves body shapes and requires permission.

=== Tengen ===
Voiced by: Yoshiko Sakakibara (Japanese); Laura Post (English)

Tengen (天元) is an immortal Jujutsu Sorcerer who permanently resides within the Tombs of the Star Corridor to maintain the protective barriers around the two Jujutsu High schools. As the foundational figure for Jujutsu Sorcerers, Tengen is worshipped as a deity by spawning religious groups. They have no problems with aging, but they must restore their body every five hundred years by merging with a specific human (referred to as a "Star Plasma Vessel") to prevent their technique from making it evolve beyond humanity and into a potentially dangerous state. Kenjaku seeks to forcibly merge Tengen with all of humanity, a plan central to the Culling Games. After Kenjaku's defeat, Tengen's soul is transferred to Sukuna. Following Sukuna's death, remnants of Tengen are discovered within his remains. These remnants are preserved by Yoshinobu Gakuganji to sustain Japan's barriers until a permanent solution is found.

=== Zen'in Clan ===
The Zen'in Clan (禪院 家, Zen'in Ke) is one of the Three Big Sorcerer Families, along with the Gojo Clan and the Kamo Clan. It is a clan known to have problematic ideals, only recognizing male family members with powerful techniques, otherwise they are rejected and not even considered as human beings. For this reason, Toji Fushiguro and Maki Zen'in left the clan due to their lack of Cursed Energy.

==== Naobito Zen'in ====
Voiced by: Jouji Nakata (Japanese); Kyle Hebert (English)

Naobito Zen'in (禪院 直毘人, Zen'in Naobito) is the head of the Zen'in family and a Special Grade 1 sorcerer, whose Cursed Technique is Projection Sorcery (投射呪法, Tōsha Juhō), which traces movement at twenty-four frames per second and traps anyone touched by the user, who disobeys that rule inside a frame for one second. This technique made Naobito the fastest sorcerer after Gojo. Naobito is always seen drinking, even in serious situations like in Shibuya. Though when it comes to a fight, he is ecstatic especially facing a powerful opponent. He was confident in his abilities enough to fight the Special Grade curse, Dagon—even while he was trapped in Dagon's Domain Expansion. He dies after the events of the Shibuya Incident from Jogo's flames right after Dagon had been exorcised, making Megumi Fushiguro the current head of the clan.

==== Naoya Zen'in ====
Voiced by: Kōji Yusa, Minami Hinata (young) (Japanese); Alan Lee, Laura Post (young) (English)

Naoya Zen'in (禪院 直哉, Zen'in Naoya) is the arrogant heir of the Zen'in clan who wields Projection Sorcery (投射呪法, Tōsha Juhō). Embodying the clan's toxic ideals, he particularly torments Maki Zen'in for rejecting traditional gender roles. After Megumi Fushiguro is named clan head instead of him, Naoya seeks revenge. Following his humiliating defeat and death at Maki's hands, he returns as a Vengeful Cursed Spirit with enhanced abilities including flight. During the Culling Games, he deploys his Time Cell Moon Palace (時胞月宮殿, Jihō Gekkyūden) Domain Expansion against Maki, but her unique physiology renders it ineffective, leading to his final destruction.

==== Ogi Zen'in ====
Voiced by: Keiichi Sonobe (Japanese); Jamie Simone (English)

Ogi Zen'in (禪院 扇, Zen'in Ōgi) is a Special Grade-1 sorcerer, who is the father of Mai and Maki Zen'in, and the brother of Naobito Zen'in. He believed he could have become the head of the Zen'in Clan if it were not for his daughters. He sees them as failures for not having talent in Jujutsu and even does not hesitate to attack his own children fatally. His Cursed Technique is Blazing Courage (焦眉之赳, Shōbi no Kyū), which allows the user to eject flames from their weapon. Ogi uses this technique with his katana, being capable of both ejecting fire to replace the broken blade and intensifying it to make the flames deadlier. An enraged Maki later killed him in their second duel to avenge the death of her twin sister.

==== Jinichi Zen'in ====
Voiced by: Hiroshi Shirokuma (Japanese); Kayleigh McKee (English)

Jinichi Zen'in (禪院 甚壱, Zen'in Jin'ichi) is a large and brutish man and a member of the clan's elite unit of Jujutsu Sorcerers, the Hei, led by Naoya Zen'in. He is a Special Grade 1 sorcerer with great capabilities in sorcery, unlike his little brother Toji Fushiguro, who has zero Cursed Energy. His Cursed Technique allows him to manifest a barrage of giant fists to accompany his punches. He was later killed and decapitated by Maki.

==== Ranta Zen'in ====
Voiced by: Shōya Chiba (Japanese); Elijah Ungvary (English)

Ranta Zen'in (禪院 蘭太, Zen'in Ranta) is the youngest member of the clan's elite unit of Jujutsu Sorcerers, the Hei, led by Naoya Zen'in. He is a Semi-Grade 1 sorcerer. Ranta is known to be respectful and responsible to his fellow Zen'in Clan members. His Cursed Technique allows him to restrict movement, which he uses to support Jinichi's attacks. He died from the injuries he gained from using his technique in extreme measures.

==== Chojuro Zen'in ====
Voiced by: Kazuho Takei (Japanese); Matthew David Rudd (English)

Chojuro Zen'in (禪院 長寿郎, Zen'in Chōjurō) is an old and short man of the clan's elite unit of Jujutsu Sorcerers, the Hei, led by Naoya Zen'in. His Cursed Technique allows him to manipulate the earth and create giant stone arms from the ground. He was easily killed by Maki.

==== Nobuaki Zen'in ====
Voiced by: Hinata Tadokoro

Nobuaki Zen'in (禪院 信朗, Zen'in Nobuaki) is the captain of the Kukuru unit—a branch lower than the Hei unit where all male clan members with no Innate Technique are obligated to join and undergo intense training to keep up with the rest of the clan who have their own techniques. He and his unit were all killed by Maki.

==== Maki and Mai's mother ====
Voiced by: Yurika Hino (Japanese); Tara Sands (Jujutsu Kaisen 0), Anjali Kunapaneni (season 3) (English)

The unnamed mother of Maki and Mai and Ogi's wife is a servant of the Zen'in clan. She is never shown speaking or walking alongside the male members. Maki murders her by slitting her throat. However, she perishes shortly after stabbing Naoya in the back while he is wounded and crawling on the ground. Although she expressed her disappointment to Maki, in her final moments it is revealed that she is glad she gave birth to her daughters.

=== Gojo Clan ===
The Gojo clan is one of the Three Big Sorcerer Families, alongside the Zen'in and Kamo clans. While the Gojo clan has had other members throughout different eras, Satoru Gojo is the current clan head and is widely regarded as the strongest individual in the modern era. This empowers him to act selfishly and protect individuals such as Yuji Itadori and Yuta Okkotsu against the unreasonable nature of the more conservative members of the jujutsu community. Following Satoru's death in the Shinjuku Showdown, Yuta took over as head of the clan by 2035, with the other members presumably becoming part of the Okkotsu family.

==== Yuka Okkotsu ====
Yuka Okkotsu (乙骨憂花, Okkotsu Yūka) is a Jujutsu Socerer, the granddaughter of Maki Zen'in and Yuta Okkotsu and the younger sister of Tsurugi. Her cursed technique is the hereditary technique of the Zen'in Clan, the Ten Shadows Technique, though she uniquely infuses her own body and martial arts with the attributes of the shikigami, and it is implied that she has inherited her grandfather's massive Cursed Energy. Like her brother, she aims to become the strongest sorcerer in order to prove her worthiness to inherit her grandfather's ring, which presumably contains Rika. However, she suffers from a malignant brain tumor and has only six months left to live. Despite this, she is enjoying her remaining time and is still working hard to achieve her lifelong goal.

==== Tsurugi Okkotsu ====
Tsurugi Okkotsu (乙骨真剣, Okkotsu Tsurugi) is a Jujutsu Sorcerer, the grandson of Maki Zen'in and Yuta Okkotsu and the older brother of Yuka. Similar to his grandmother, he inherits her Heavenly Restriction, which grants him superhuman physical abilities. He also wields the curse tool Honoyagi katana and practises Shadow Style: Simple Domain Techniques. He inherited his grandfather's ring from the clan and a version of the Rika Orimoto spirit attached to it, but he refuses to accept it as he aims to become the strongest sorcerer in order to prove his independence to the other people in the Jujutsu world. He intends to give the ring to his sister when she is "ready".

== Curse Users ==
Sorcerers who use Jujutsu for evil and malicious deeds such as killing. Evil non-sorcerers who possess knowledge of Jujutsu and are active in the Curse User community are known as Non-Curse Users.

=== Ryomen Sukuna ===
Voiced by: Junichi Suwabe (Japanese); Ray Chase (English)

Ryomen Sukuna (両面 宿儺, Ryōmen Sukuna), the "King of Curses", is a legendary Heian-era sorcerer who reincarnates through 20 indestructible fingers. His Shrine (御厨子, Mizushi) technique includes Dismantle (解, Kai) (ranged slashes), Cleave (捌, Hachi) (adaptive melee attacks), and Divine Flame (竈, Kamino) (fire manipulation). His barrier-less Malevolent Shrine (伏魔御厨子, Fukuma Mizushi) Domain Expansion unleashes omnidirectional slashes across 200 meters. Initially possessing Yuji Itadori, Sukuna later transfers to Megumi Fushiguro's body after the Shibuya Incident, where he massacres civilians and defeats Satoru Gojo. Though he overwhelms opponents like Kashimo, a coordinated assault by Yuji, Yuta, and Maki—combined with Megumi's resistance and Nobara's Resonance—weakens him. After Yuji's decisive Black Flash, Sukuna refuses redemption and disintegrates.

=== Kenjaku ===
Voiced by: Takahiro Sakurai (Japanese); Lex Lang (English)

Kenjaku (羂索) is an ancient sorcerer. He orchestrated the Shibuya Incident and Culling Game to recreate the Heian era in modern Japan. Initially appearing as the deceased Suguru Geto, he is actually a brain-like entity that transfers between hosts, retaining their Cursed Techniques, such as Geto's Cursed Spirit Manipulation and Kaori Itadori's Antigravity. He manipulated Mahito's group and used Noritoshi Kamo's body to create the Cursed Womb: Death Paintings. During the Culling Games, he resumed his Kamo identity, exiled the current clan head, and attempted to absorb Tengen. After a fierce battle with Yuki Tsukumo and Choso, he killed Yuki and fled with her research. Later, Takaba engaged him in a reality-warped fight, allowing Yuta to decapitate him. Before dying, Kenjaku added a rule enabling Megumi (possessed by Sukuna) to start the merger. Yuta used Kenjaku's brain transfer technique to possess Gojo's corpse to fight Sukuna. Post-battle, Geto appears with Takaba, but it is unclear if it is Kenjaku or Geto.

=== Uraume ===
Voiced by: Mitsuki Saiga (Japanese); Erica Mendez (English)

Uraume (裏梅) is a mysterious Curse User aligned with Kenjaku that has existed for a thousand years. Their Curse Technique, Ice Formation (氷凝 呪法, Hikori Juhō) allows them to materialize and manipulate ice. Their abilities are powerful enough to freeze a large group of people and is even capable of using Reverse Curse Technique to heal themselves. Sukuna regards them as an ally because of their delicious cooking. They are the one, who sent Kumiya and Shigemo to the Sister School Event as distractions, and also send Shigemo to kill assistant managers during the Shibuya Incident. During the Shinjuku Showdown, Hakari alone faces off against Uraume to separate them from Sukuna, while he faces off against all the other sorcerers. Upon Sukuna's death, Uraume ends their own life.

=== Haruta Shigemo ===
Voiced by: Wataru Hatano (Japanese); Chris Hackney (English)

Haruta Shigemo (重面 春太, Shigemo Haruta) is a Curse User with the technique Miracles (奇跡, Kiseki), which accumulates minor daily miracles (marked under his eyes) to prevent fatal injuries. During the Sister School Event, he serves as Uraume's distraction before later assassinating Jujutsu School managers in Shibuya. After attacking Nobara Kugisaki and nearly killing Megumi Fushiguro, Kento Nanami brutally assaults him for his crimes. Shigemo narrowly escapes but accidentally triggers Sukuna's Domain Expansion during the Mahoraga summoning, resulting in his death.

=== Juzo Kumiya ===
Voiced by: Tetsu Inada (Japanese); Xander Mobus (English)

Juzo Kumiya (組屋 鞣造, Kumiya Juzo) is a Curse User who is keen on murdering people and using their body parts for his handicrafts and tools. Uraume hired him for their mission during the Goodwill Event. He has a workshop of many powerful cursed tools. Dragon-Bone is considered his masterpiece, and is later obtained by Maki Zen'in. His limbs are destroyed by Gojo and he is captured and interrogated by the Jujutsu School Managers.

=== Jiro Awasaka and Ogami ===
Voiced by: Minoru Hirota (Japanese); Edward Bosco (English) (Jiro Awasaka)
Voiced by: Jun Karasawa (Ogami)

Jiro Awasaka (粟坂 二良, Awasaka Jirō) and Ogami (オガミ) are a pair of old Curse Users hired by Kenjaku to raise curtains in Shibuya. They feared Gojo, claiming their freedom was taken from them because of his Six Eyes and Limitless Technique. Ogami possesses Séance Technique (降霊術, Kōrei Jutsu), and uses her grandson as a vessel to summon someone and use their abilities, while Awasaka has the Inverse Technique (あべこべ, Abekobe), which makes attacks targeting him weaker the stronger they are and vice versa.

=== Niji Ebina ===
Voiced by: Hironori Kondō (Japanese); Edward Bosco (English)

Niji Ebina (蛯名 仁次, Ebina Niji) is a powerful Curse User that Kenjaku hired in Shibuya. He patrolled the subway and ran into Mei Mei's group but was ultimately defeated by her.

=== Kokun and Bayer ===
Voiced by: Kazuki Kyan (Japanese); Mick Lauer (English) (Kokun)
Voiced by: Yukitoshi Tokumoto (Bayer)

Kokun (コークン, Kōkun) and Bayer (バイエル, Baieru) are two soldiers from a faction of Curse Users called 'Q'. They were tasked in assassinating Riko Amanai to stop her from merging with Tengen but were ultimately defeated by Gojo and Geto.

=== Junpei Yoshino ===
Voiced by: Yoshitaka Yamaya (Japanese); Nicolas Roye (English)

Junpei Yoshino (吉野 順平, Yoshino Junpei) is a bullied high school student who develops a cynical worldview after enduring abuse. He falls under Mahito's influence when the curse murders his tormentors, adopting the belief that humanity is inherently malicious. Mahito awakens Junpei's Cursed Technique—summoning a venomous jellyfish shikigami—through forced brain transfiguration. Though forming a genuine friendship with Yuji Itadori, Mahito's manipulation leads Junpei to confront him. Realizing too late that Mahito exploited him, Junpei is grotesquely transformed and dies begging Yuji for help, becoming one of the first victims to demonstrate Mahito's cruel nature and the dangers of his Idle Transfiguration (無為転変, Mui Tenpen) technique.

=== Suguru Geto's Group ===
==== Suguru Geto ====
Voiced by: Takahiro Sakurai (Japanese); Lex Lang (English)
Portrayed by: Nagi Murata (2024 PV)

Suguru Geto (夏油 傑, Getō Suguru) was a Special Grade sorcerer and classmate of Satoru Gojo, known for his Cursed Spirit Manipulation (呪霊操術, Jurei Sōjutsu) technique. This ability allowed him to absorb and control curses, with stronger spirits requiring prior defeat. His ultimate technique, Maximum: Uzumaki (極ノ番うずまき, Gokunoban Uzumaki), combined multiple curses into a devastating attack while extracting their techniques for single use. Once considered equal to Gojo in strength, Geto's worldview shattered after the Star Plasma Vessel incident, leading him to advocate exterminating non-sorcerers to create a curse-free world. Following his defeat by Yuta Okkotsu in Jujutsu Kaisen 0, Geto was killed by Gojo, leaving his body to be possessed by Kenjaku. His ultimate fate remains ambiguous after appearing alive post-battle with Takaba.

==== Nanako Hasaba ====
Voiced by: Satsumi Matsuda (Japanese); Ryan Bartley (English)

Nanako Hasaba (枷場 菜々子, Hasaba Nanako) is a young cursed user that Geto took under his wing. After seeing the twin girls being mistreated and locked in a cage by their village, Geto's hatred for non-sorcerers grew stronger as he went mad and cursed all of the villagers. Her technique allows her to manipulate photographed subjects captured in her phone's camera. She cares deeply for Geto and is extremely angry at Kenjaku for taking over his body. Sukuna kills her in the events of the Shibuya Incident. Her death, along with many other innocent civilians, traumatized Yuji.

==== Mimiko Hasaba ====
Voiced by: Risae Matsuda (Japanese); Sarah Anne Williams (English)

Mimiko Hasaba (枷場 美々子, Hasaba Mimiko) is the twin sister of Nanako. She always carries a cursed doll around, which is involved with her technique. She cares deeply for Geto and is extremely angry at Kenjaku for taking over his body. Sukuna kills her in the events of the Shibuya Incident. Her death, along with many other innocent civilians, traumatized Yuji.

==== Miguel Oduol ====
Voiced by: Kōichi Yamadera (Japanese); Bill Butts (English)

Miguel Oduol (ミゲル・オドゥオール, Migeru Odouōru) is a Curse User from Kenya. He was an ally of Geto, but after his death, the group parted ways. Gojo recruits Miguel to train Yuta Okkotsu in Africa. His weapon of choice is the special-grade cursed tool that belonged to his clan, the Black Rope. It nullifies the effects of any Cursed Technique. Besides being proficient with Curse Tool, he has a Cursed Technique called Prayer Song (祈祷の歌(ハクナ・ラーナ), Hakuna Rāna), which helps his body gain a rhythm in order to enhance it and better dodge attacks. Due to some convincing from his student Yuta and Gojo, Miguel also joins in the battle against Sukuna, saving Ui Ui and Kusakabe, while also distracting Sukuna, so Yuji and Choso could take advantage of it.

==== Larue ====
Voiced by: Show Hayami

Larue (ラルゥ, Rarū) is a Curse User with two techniques: Heart Catch (人心掌握, Hāto Kyatchi) creates a regenerating Cursed Energy hand that transfers 10% of damage back to him, while Cutie Honey (こっちを向いてキューティーハニ, Kyūtīhanī) forcibly redirects targets' attention (marked by heart-shaped pupils). Formerly allied with Suguru Geto, he later assisted Yuki Tsukumo and joined Miguel against Sukuna. During the Shinjuku battle, Larue successfully distracted Sukuna enabling Yuji Itadori's attacks until Sukuna's Black Flash incapacitated him, prompting Miguel's intervention. His techniques proved strategically valuable despite the personal risk from damage feedback.

==== Manami Suda ====
Voiced by: Shizuka Itō (Japanese); Laura Post (Jujutsu Kaisen 0) (English)

Manami Suda (菅田 真奈美, Suda Manami) is a Curse User of unknown capabilities. She was an ally of Geto, but after his death the group parted ways. She decided to work alongside Kenjaku during the Shibuya plan along with Negi and the two of them hold up Atsuya Kusakabe and Panda, after recognizing them as Jujutsu Sorcerers. Their altercation is interrupted by the battle between Sukuna and Jogo. When they attempt to escape Jogo's Maximum: Meteor Technique, Sukuna stops them from escaping just to amuse himself. Unlike Panda and Kusakabe, she and Negi are unable to escape Jogo's meteor and are killed.

==== Toshihisa Negi ====
Voiced by: Go Inoue (Japanese); Kellen Goff (English)

Toshihisa Negi (祢木 利久, Negi Toshihisa) is a Curse User of unknown capabilities. He was an ally of Geto, but after his death the group parted ways. He decided to work alongside Kenjaku during the Shibuya plan along with Suda and the two of them hold up Atsuya Kusakabe and Panda, after recognizing them as Jujutsu Sorcerers. Their altercation is interrupted by the battle between Sukuna and Jogo. When they attempt to escape Jogo's Maximum: Meteor Technique, Sukuna stops them from escaping just to amuse himself. Unlike Panda and Kusakabe, he and Manami are unable to escape Jogo's meteor and are killed.

== Cursed Spirits ==
Spiritual beings manifested from Cursed Energy as a result of negative energy that flow out of humans in the forms of monsters, ghosts (yūrei and onryō), and yōkai. They bring harm to humanity and are consequently the primary targets of Jujutsu Sorcerers.

=== Rika Orimoto ===
Voiced by: Kana Hanazawa (Japanese); Anairis Quiñones (English)

Rika Orimoto (祈本 里香, Orimoto Rika) was Yuta Okkotsu's childhood friend who became a Special Grade Vengeful Cursed Spirit after a fatal car accident. Bound by their marriage promise symbolized by a ring, she protected Yuta with immense Cursed Energy and physical strength. In Jujutsu Kaisen 0, Suguru Geto targeted Rika for his Cursed Spirit Manipulation technique due to her power. After the curse was lifted, Rika's spirit departed. Yuta retains a weakened version of the Rika shikigami, maintaining access to residual abilities. The silver ring remains their connection.

=== Mahito ===
Voiced by: Nobunaga Shimazaki (Japanese); Lucien Dodge (English)

Mahito (真人) is a Special Grade Cursed Spirit embodying human hatred, seeking humanity's extinction. His philosophy of life's meaninglessness stems from his Idle Transfiguration (無為転変, Mui Tenpen) technique, allowing him to perceive and reshape souls—including his own—which he views as mere objects. This enables grotesque bodily transformations of victims. During battles with Yuji Itadori and Kento Nanami, he develops his Self-Embodiment of Perfection (自閉円頓裹, Jihei Endonka) Domain Expansion, instantly affecting souls within its range. In Shibuya, he kills Nanami and Kokichi Muta while maiming Nobara Kugisaki and Aoi Todo before Yuji defeats him. Kenjaku ultimately absorbs Mahito, utilizing his technique to activate Cursed Techniques in marked humans for the Culling Game.

=== Jogo ===
Voiced by: Shigeru Chiba (Japanese); Michael Sorich (English)

Jogo (漏瑚, Jōgo) is a Special Grade Cursed Spirit embodying volcanic forces, capable of generating eruptions and manipulating fire. His abilities include the Coffin of the Iron Mountain (蓋棺鉄囲山, Gaikan Tecchisen) Domain Expansion, which creates a volcanic interior, and Maximum: Meteor (極ノ番隕, Goku no ban: In), summoning a massive flaming projectile. A radical idealist, Jogo believes Cursed Spirits represent humanity's true nature and seeks human extinction. His overconfidence leads to a crushing defeat against Satoru Gojo. During the Shibuya Incident, after wounding Nanami and Maki while killing Naobito Zen'in, he attempts to recruit Sukuna, only to be effortlessly defeated by the King of Curses, who nonetheless acknowledges Jogo's combat prowess before his death.

=== Dagon ===
Voiced by: Kenta Miyake, Aya Endō (Cursed Womb) (Japanese); Jamieson Price (English)

Dagon (陀艮) is a Special Grade Cursed Spirit embodying oceanic fears. Initially appearing as the weakest among his peers, he existed in Cursed Womb form until fully maturing in Shibuya after consuming numerous humans. His abilities include water generation and the Domain Expansion Horizon of the Captivating Skandha (蕩蘊平線, Tau'un Heisen), creating a beach environment with predatory fish shikigami. He demonstrated combat prowess by severely injuring Naobito Zen'in and Kento Nanami. Dagon maintained strong bonds with fellow curses Hanami, Jogo and Mahito. His existence ended when exorcised by Toji Fushiguro's intervention during the Shibuya Incident.

=== Hanami ===
Voiced by: Atsuko Tanaka (Japanese); Marie Westbrook (English)

Hanami (花御) is a Special Grade Cursed Spirit born of humanity's negative treatment towards the forests—to which Gojo reveals that Hanami may be more closer to a natural spirit than a Cursed Spirit. They believe humans have gone too long in ruining Earth's environment and want to allow the planet to shine again without human cruelty. Their Cursed Technique allows them to create plants that they can manipulate, including draining their life force and storing it in the flower on their left shoulder as Cursed Energy. They also possess a Domain Expansion called Shining Sea of Growing Branches (朶頤 光海, Dai Kōkai), which they normally use in tandem with their fully charged left arm, but the use of this against Yuji and Todo was prevented by Gojo. During the Shibuya Incident, they are a part of the team of Special Grades that ambush Gojo, though Gojo exorcises them by crushing them into a corner with Infinity before he can be sealed.

=== Locust Guy ===
Voiced by: Mitsuaki Kanuka

Locust Guy (蝗GUY, Ko-Guy) is a Cursed Spirit working for Mahito's group and was tasked in guarding the commissioned curtains around Shibuya. It was born from the negative emotions revolving around the locust plague. Yuji encountered the curse while on his way to the Shibuya Station. It was clever enough to communicate and follow orders but was overpowered and exorcised by Yuji.

=== Kuchisaki-Onna ===
Voiced by: Hiroko Kiso

Kuchisaki-Onna (口裂け女) is an Imaginary Vengeful Spirit born from the fear of the famous urban legend. At some point in time, Suguru Geto was able to capture and use her with his Curse Spirit Manipulation Technique. She was used by Geto to fight against Toji Fushiguro during the Star Plasma Vessel mission but was exorcised after her innate Domain to trap the sorcerer killer failed.

== Cursed Womb: Death Paintings ==
The Cursed Womb: Death Paintings are small human-like fetuses with the mixed blood of both a human and a Cursed Spirit, created by Kenjaku 150 years ago after forcing a woman with a special genetic composition to bear half-human, half-curse children from having nine pregnancies and nine abortions. When ingested by any human, a Death Painting Womb can incarnate into a full half-human half-Cursed Spirit hybrid capable of using Jujutsu, which can be anyone, even a human with zero innate talent or the potential to become a sorcerer. Fully incarnated Death Painting Wombs are considered on the level of a Special-Grade Cursed spirit. Due to their flesh and blood bodies, these beings can be seen by normal humans, and even sorcerers can have trouble telling whether they are Cursed Spirits or Curse Users. Unlike Cursed Spirits, their bodies do not disappear after death.

=== Choso ===
Voiced by: Daisuke Namikawa (Japanese); Ray Chase (English)

Choso (脹相, Chōsō) is the eldest of nine Cursed Spirit-human hybrids who wields Blood Manipulation (赤血操術, Sekketsu Sōjutsu) with enhanced efficiency due to his hybrid physiology. Initially seeking vengeance for his brothers' deaths during the Shibuya Incident, he recognizes Yuji Itadori as his half-brother mid-battle and switches allegiances. After protecting Yuji during his fugitive status, Choso assists Yuki Tsukumo in defending Tengen before focusing on training Yuji in blood-based techniques. His combat expertise proves vital during the Shinjuku Showdown against Sukuna, where he makes the ultimate sacrifice—intercepting Sukuna's Divine Flame (竈, Kamino) technique to save Yuji. Choso's arc evolves from vengeful antagonist to devoted protector, completing his narrative as the caring elder brother figure.

=== Eso ===
Voiced by: Nobuyuki Hiyama (Japanese); Landon McDonald (English)

Eso (壊相, Esō) is the second brother among the Death Paintings. Unlike Choso who looks completely human, he has a grotesque face on his back as Kugisaki mistook him for a Cursed Spirit or Cursed User. His Cursed Technique is the Rot Technique (蝕爛腐術, Shokuran Fujutsu). Targets of this technique decompose merely in minutes once they are exposed to the poisonous blood of the Death Paintings. Itadori kills him with Kugisaki's help, though he empathizes with the brothers.

=== Kechizu ===
Voiced by: Kappei Yamaguchi

Kechizu (血塗) is the third brother. Unlike his older brothers, Choso and Eso who looks human, Kechizu has turquoise skin with a hunchback, claws, and two mouths with jagged teeth. He has a small face on the upper part of his head and a giant mouth just beneath it, his eyes as well as both his mouth have dark blood dripping from it as Yuji and his friends mistook him for a Cursed Spirit. Kugisaki kills him on the highway after being poisoned by them.

== Culling Game ==
=== Kogane ===
Voiced by: Neeko

Kogane (コガネ) are the shikigami that act as the interface of the Culling Game, serving as the liaison between the player and the game, through which new rules can be added to the games.

=== Players ===
==== Tsumiki Fushiguro ====
Voiced by: Saori Hayami (Japanese); Suzie Yeung (English)

Tsumiki Fushiguro (伏黒 津美紀, Fushiguro Tsumiki) is the kind adopted step-daughter of Toji and the older step-sister of Megumi. She was in a coma as a result of a curse that Kenjaku inflicted. She has recently been awakened and ensnared in the Culling Game, along with many other cursed victims across Japan. Upon entering the games, it is revealed she is not a newly awakened sorcerer as Megumi theorized, but possessed by an incarnated Heian Era sorcerer from over 1,000 years ago known as Yorozu. After Yorozu's death, she is also killed and her grave is later seen after the Shinjuku fight.

==== Hana Kurusu ====
Hana Kurusu (来栖 華, Kurusu Hana) is a Culling Game participant who shares her body with the ancient sorcerer Angel (天使, Tenshi). Their symbiotic relationship grants the ability Technique Extinguishment (術式の消滅, Jutsushiki no Shōmetsu), which nullifies Cursed Techniques, including the offensive Maximum Output: Jacob's Ladder (出力最大邪去悔の梯子, Shutsuryoku Saidai: Yakobu no Hashigo)—a devastating pillar of light that erases techniques. Initially recruited to free Gojo from the Prison Realm, they later target Sukuna after he possesses Megumi Fushiguro. During the Shinjuku Showdown, Yuta Okkotsu copies their technique while Aoi Todo strategically positions them to strike Sukuna with Jacob's Ladder. Though Sukuna withstands the attack, Todo intercepts his counterblow, saving the injured Hana and Angel.

==== Fumihiko Takaba ====
Voiced by: Satoshi Tsuruoka (Japanese); Scott Whyte (English)
Portrayed by: Hiromu Makino (2024 PV)

Fumihiko Takaba (髙羽 史彦, Takaba Fumihiko) is a failing comedian and is discouraged by his poor performance in a comedy club. Later, he was declared a player of the Culling Game and became Megumi Fushiguro's unexpected ally. His Cursed Technique, Comedian (超人, Komedian) allows his punchlines to become reality, albeit Takaba himself is not aware of his own abilities. He helps Itadori's group during the Culling Games, by defeating Iori Hazenoki and later, during the Shinjuku Showdown, he plays a major role in defeating Kenjaku with Okkotsu and Todo.

==== Hiromi Higuruma ====
Voiced by: Tomokazu Sugita (Japanese); Ben Balmaceda (English)

Hiromi Higuruma (日車 寛見, Higuruma Hiromi) is a disillusioned defense lawyer turned Culling Games participant who awakens cursed abilities after witnessing judicial corruption. His technique summons Judgeman (ジャッジマン, Jajjiman), a shikigami that enforces rulings within his Deadly Sentencing (誅伏賜死, Chūbuku Shishi) Domain Expansion. This Domain can confiscate techniques or Cursed Energy while providing him with an adaptive gavel weapon. After losing to Yuji Itadori, Higuruma joins the sorcerers' cause. During the Shinjuku Showdown, he temporarily disables Sukuna's cursed tool, earning the King of Curses' reluctant respect. Though ultimately outmatched, Higuruma survives to analyze Sukuna's combat strategy, realizing the curse had been holding back throughout their confrontation.

==== Rin Amai ====
Voiced by: Soma Saito (Japanese); Ben Balmaceda (English)

Rin Amai (甘井 凛, Amai Rin) is a modern sorcerer who recognized Yuji from their hometown, Sendai City. Like other modern sorcerers he was forced to participate in the Culling Game by Kenjaku. His unnamed Cursed Technique entails sugar manipulation. This technique allows Amai to increase his own sugar level and transform the sugar into a physical form, usually as pudding. After doing so, his low blood sugar causes him to suffer hypoglycemia and makes him light-headed. He can also infuse others with his sugar to boost their status or health. During the Shinjuku Showdown, he joins Shoko and Arata Nitta in the efforts of healing downed sorcerers.

==== Remi ====
Voiced by: Ari Ozawa (Japanese); Cristina Vee (English)

Remi (麗美, Remi) is a cheeky and manipulative modern sorcerer. She has been a player since the beginning of the game. She uses her charm to trick unsuspecting players into taking them to her boss Reggie. Her Cursed Technique allows her to manipulate her hair.

==== Reggie Star ====
Voiced by: Yutaka Aoyama (Japanese); Alejandro Saab (English)

Reggie Star (レジィ・スター, Rejii Sutā) is a reincarnated sinister foreign sorcerer and a Culling Game player who Remi works for. His Cursed Technique Contractual Re-Creation (再契象, Saikesshō) allows him to summon any object he bought through the receipts he carries on his body. He led a small group of sorcerers who target new players. He is a sorcerer from the past who has incarnated into a body of the present. Using strategy, he survived the early stages of the game and deduced that Kenjaku will reveal something once only the strongest players are left. He uses Remi to attract potential allies or victims to collect points. This led Megumi to a trap in Shinjuku, where Reggie and his allies ambushed the student. He gets into a gruesome fight with Megumi, eventually losing. Afterwards, he provides some information about the game and Kenjaku's plans.

==== Chizuru Hari ====
Voiced by: Toshitsugu Takashina

Chizuru Hari (針 千釣, Hari Chizuru) is a sorcerer who is in an alliance with Reggie Star in the Culling Game. He has a Cursed Technique that turns his fingers into sharp claws to attack his opponents. He was later killed by Megumi Fushiguro much to Reggie Star's dismay as it was a 'waste of points'.

==== Iori Hazenoki ====
Voiced by: Ryōta Ōsaka (Japanese); Elijah Ungvary (English)

Iori Hazenoki (黄櫨 折, Hazenoki Iori) is a reincarnated sorcerer who is in an alliance with Reggie Star in the Culling Game. Hazenoki has mastered the ability to heal oneself using Reverse Curse Technique, a rare skill among sorcerers. He uses this in tandem with his Cursed Technique which allows him to detonate certain parts of his body, such as eyeballs and teeth and create deadly explosions. While Sukuna faces off against everyone in Shinjuku, he encounters Kenjaku in the Lake Gosho Colony by chance, as the latter is eliminating Culling Game players that are no longer needed for his plans. Iori attempts to fight Kenjaku, but he loses his life in the process.

==== Hanyu and Haba ====
Voiced by: Junko Takeuchi (Hanyu)
Voiced by: Eiji Takemoto (Haba)

Hanyu (羽生, Hanyū) and Haba (羽場) are Culling Game players that camp in locations where new players appear as they enter Kenjaku's barrier to kill them while caught off guard. Hanyu and Haba are a couple and both have abilities that give them flight with their aircraft structured hair. Itadori defeats them both when he enters the Culling Game arena.

==== Kurourushi ====
Voiced by: Yukihiro Nozuyama (Japanese); Aleks Le (English)

Kurourushi (黒沐死) is a special grade Cursed Spirit born from people's negative emotions of cockroaches. It was released from Cursed Spirit Manipulation of Suguru Geto's technique under the possession of Kenjaku to become a player of the Culling Game. It terrorizes its victims in the Sendai colony by manipulating a wave of cockroaches to feed on their flesh. It was exorcised by Yuta Okkotsu but an offspring appeared later on that was again defeated by Yuta in the battle between Uro Takako and Ryuu Ishigouri. Its Cursed Technique, Earthen Insect Trance (土虫蠕定, Dochū Zenjō) is a Cursed Technique that conjures flying insect curses that carry large sacs filled with a liquid substance that splashes into its targets eyes.

==== Ryu Ishigori ====
Voiced by: Hiroki Tōchi (Japanese); Aleks Le (English)

Ryu Ishigori (石流 龍, Ishigōri Ryū) is a reincarnated Edo-era sorcerer participating in the Culling Games. As one of Sendai Colony's four dominant players, he possesses the highest recorded Cursed Energy output. His Cursed Energy Discharge (呪力の放出, Juryoku no Hōshutsu) technique fires concentrated blasts through his pompadour, with his Granite Blast (グラニテブラスト, Guranite Burasuto) capable of leveling city blocks. After losing to Yuta Okkotsu, he briefly allies with modern sorcerers before being instantly killed by Sukuna during the latter's rampage in Megumi Fushiguro's body.

==== Takako Uro ====
Voiced by: Nana Mizuki (Japanese); Erica Lindbeck (English)

Takako Uro (鳥鷺 亨子, Uro Takako) is an ancient sorcerer that Kenjaku reincarnated as a player for the Culling Game. Takako, Ishigouri, Dhruv and Kurourushi were the most powerful players within the Sendai colony, creating a deadlock between the four. In her first life, Takako Uro was the captain of the Sun, Moon, and Stars Squad, a group of assassins affiliated with the Fujiwara clan. She has a Cursed Technique that allows her to manipulate the sky. Her signature attack is Thin Ice Breaker (宇守羅彈, Usurabi), where she applies her technique offensively by hitting the surface of the sky, not her opponent directly. She hits the surface layer of the sky and shatters it like thin ice, striking her opponent with that effect. She also has a Domain Expansion. After her defeat at Yuta's hands, she decides to help the modern sorcerers.

==== Charles Bernard ====
Charles Bernard (シャルル・ベルナール, Sharuru Berunāru) is a modern sorcerer and the first opponent Hakari Kinji encounters in Tokyo Colony No.2, to whom he eventually loses and is recruited by. He is an otaku of French descent who aspires to be a successful manga artist in Japan but could not handle the criticisms of his work. His Cursed Technique summons a cursed tool called G Warstaff (G 戦杖, Jī Senjō), a long pen-shaped spear. By drawing his opponent's blood into the pen's tip, Charles can fulfill the condition for "ink". After which, Charles can use the ink to mark his opponents with a manga panel. This panel sees into the future from the present, allowing Charles to peer into his target's next action, starting with just one second. As G Warstaff draws more blood and fills with ink, Charles is able to see further into the future.

==== Hajime Kashimo ====
Voiced by: Ryōhei Kimura (Japanese); Zeno Robinson (English)

Hajime Kashimo (鹿紫 雲一, Kashimo Hajime) is a formidable reincarnated sorcerer who dominated the Culling Games with over 40 kills. His electrified Cursed Energy delivers shocking physical attacks, while his unique physiology naturally generates lightning discharges. Kashimo's ultimate technique, Mythical Beast Amber (幻獣琥珀, Genjū Kohaku), temporarily transforms his body into an electromagnetic phenomenon at the cost of his life. After modifying game rules to challenge Sukuna, he initially defeats Panda before being subdued by Kinji Hakari's intervention. During the Shinjuku Showdown, Kashimo activates his one-time technique against the fully reincarnated Sukuna, but is swiftly overwhelmed, demonstrating the vast power gap between even elite sorcerers and the King of Curses.

==== Hagane Daido ====
Hagane Daido (大道 鋼, Daidō Hagane) is a reincarnated swordsman that Kamo and Maki unexpectedly allied with in Sakurajima Colony. Hagane is a lethal fighter with a sword and is able to fight the Vengeful Spirit of Naoya, an opponent Maki was struggling with despite wielding no Cursed Energy. Similarly, he cannot see Cursed Spirits but is able to "see everything else"; this led Maki to ponder what makes her different from both Hagane and Toji.

==== Rokujushi Miyo ====
Rokujushi Miyo (三代 六十四, Miyo Rokujūshi) is a reincarnated sorcerer that Kamo and Maki unexpectedly allied with in Sakurajima Colony. Miyo is a sumo enthusiast and is visually similar to a Kappa. Despite his eccentric personality, Rokujushi acted as a sincere mentor for Maki (in contrast to Gojo and Kusakabe) and helped her reach her full potential in their brief sumo match.

==== Yorozu ====
Yorozu (万) is a powerful Jujutsu Sorcerer from Aizu during the Heian Era, recognized by the Fujiwara clan and deeply infatuated with Sukuna. After her reincarnation in Tsumiki's body during the Culling Games, she seeks him out. Her Cursed Technique, Construction (構築術式, Kōchiku Jutsushiki), allows her to recreate any known substance except special cursed tools, though the process consumes excessive Cursed Energy. Her Domain Expansion, Threefold Affliction (三重疾苦, Shikkushikku Shikku), manifests as a vast empty space filled with floating organic structures resembling insect brains and ganglia. Its sure-hit effect enhances her constructed objects, particularly the True Sphere, enabling instant destruction. When Sukuna assumes control of Megumi's body, she presents him with a cursed tool and challenges him to battle, hoping to prove her devotion. Sukuna dismisses her feelings and kills her alongside Tsumiki using the Ten Shadows Technique.

== Simurians ==
The Simurians are an alien race with the ability to use Jujutsu Sorcery. They arrived on Earth in 2086 seeking refuge.

=== Maru / Marulu Val Vol Yelvori ===
Marulu Val Vol Yelvori (マルル・ヴァル・ヴル・イェルヴリ, Maruru Varu Vuru Yeruvuri), shortened to Maru (マル, Maru), is a Simurian representative sent by the Simurians to partner with Yuka and Tsurugi for testing whether Simurians can coexist with humanity. Marulu is kind and friendly but somewhat sheltered, showing interest in Earth's culture and the Okkotsu siblings. An expert in hand-to-hand combat, Marulu possesses several Cursed Techniques: Chaos (混沌, Konton) distorts the laws of order, enabling Marulu to change the trajectory of projectiles, nullify or redirect gravity, and instantly boil or freeze water; Harmony (調和, Chōwa) brings two targets into harmony by connecting them with the world and seeking balance between them—on a single person, it identifies an equal counterpart, and on a group, it locates another similar group and enables communication between both.

=== Cross Val Vol Yelvori ===
Cross Val Vol Yelvori (クロス・ヴァル・ヴル・イェルヴリ, Kurosu Varu Vuru Yeruvuri), or short for Cross (クロス, Kurosu), is a dispatch officer of the Simurian refugees and Maru's younger twin brother. He is more distant and cold than his twin, outwardly calculating how to spark conflict with Japan initially. Beneath the surface, he is an angry and cynical person, due all the suffering his people lived through on their home planet. He shares both his Cursed Techniques with his brother Maru, Chaos and Harmony.

=== Dabura Karaba ===
Dabura Karaba (ダーブラ・カラバ) is a Simurian champion and chieftain of the Deskunte tribe, regarded as the strongest of his kind and compared to Ryomen Sukuna by other Jujutsu Sorcerers. He is aloof, solitary and fiercely loyal to his people, especially to his younger sister, Spejo, who wishes to save from a curse by coming to Earth. Dabura possesses multiple Cursed Techniques, uses a Black Rope, and adapts quickly to Earth's cursed energy. One inherited technique, unpronounceable by Earthlings, is described as "murderous intent given tangible form" (質量なもった殺意, Shitsuryō Namotta Satsui). His primary technique, Light (光, Hikari), fires mass-destructive light beams from his limbs that can solidify into hard light constructs to restrain targets or support weight. While using Light, Dabura moves at sub-light speed and applies the kinetic energy of his attacks. Its positive reversal, Darkness (暗闇, Kurayami), has unknown effects. Dabura's Domain Expansion, Otherworld Between Darkness and Light: Reverse Transcendence (幽明異境: 逆越, Yūmei Ikyō; Sakagoe), manifests as an abstract environment of blocky solid-light structures with a sphere-like construct behind him.

== Other characters ==
=== Wasuke Itadori ===
Voiced by: Shigeru Chiba (Japanese); Kyle Hebert (English)

Wasuke Itadori (虎杖 倭助, Itadori Wasuke) was the grandfather and only guardian of Yuji. In his final moments, he gives his grandson advice to help people.

=== Setsuko Sasaki and Takeshi Iguchi ===
Voiced by: Mariya Ise (Japanese); Xanthe Huynh (English) (Setsuko)
Voiced by: Takahiro Sumi (Japanese); Kyle Hebert (English) (Takeshi)

Setsuko Sasaki (佐々木 節子, Sasaki Setsuko) and Takeshi Iguchi (井口 たけし, Iguchi Takeshi) are Yuji's seniors from Sugisawa Third High School. They are members of the Occult Research Club along with Yuji. The club stumbled upon one of Sukuna's fingers which was kept as the school's talisman. Sasaki was able to peel off its seal only for Cursed Spirits to attack both of them. They were later saved by Megumi and Yuji and Yuji visits them in the hospital. Not long after the start of the Culling Games, Kenjaku approaches Sasaki and thanks her for being friends with their "son".

=== Nagi Yoshino ===
Voiced by: Junko Noda (Japanese); Amber Lee Connors (English)

Nagi Yoshino (吉野 凪, Yoshino Nagi) is the mother of Junpei. She was killed by a Cursed Spirit attracted to Sukuna's finger that was left in her house by Mahito. Her death led Junpei to become a Curse User.

=== Nobuko Takada ===
Voiced by: Tomoyo Kurosawa (Japanese); Laura Post (English)

Nobuko Takada (高田 延子, Takada Nobuko), better known as "Tall Idol Takada-chan" or simply "Takada-chan", is a popular Japanese idol. Aoi Todo is one of her biggest fans to the point that she plays a huge role in his decision-making processes in battle.

=== Shiu Kong / Kong Si-woo ===
Voiced by: Hiroki Yasumoto (Japanese); Mick Lauer (English)

Shiu Kong (孔 時雨, Kon Shiu)/Kong Si-woo (공 시우, Gong Si-u) is a Korean national and a frequent collaborator of Toji Fushiguro, who contracted the latter to kill the Star Plasma Vessel in 2006. Though he has the ability to see Cursed Spirits, he is not a sorcerer.

=== Toji Fushiguro ===
Voiced by: Takehito Koyasu (Japanese); Nicolas Roye (English)

Toji Fushiguro (伏黒 甚爾, Fushiguro Tōji) is a former member of the Zen'in Clan, he is known as the "Sorcerer Killer" and is the father of Megumi. Like Maki, he was born with a Heavenly Restriction, rendering him unable to use Cursed Techniques. In exchange, he was given immense physical prowess, and his senses reached a point where he could still interact with Cursed Spirits. His lack of Cursed Energy allows him to sneak up on and kill Jujutsu Sorcerers, and his Inverted Spear of Heaven allows him to bypass any Cursed Technique. He defeated Gojo and Geto on their first encounter, bringing Gojo to the brink of death. He is callous and has little regard for his own family, selling Megumi to the Zen'in Clan for money and even forgetting his name. However, in his final moments, he asked Gojo to protect Megumi from being sold. During another instance, he killed himself after finding out that Megumi was not a Zen'in so that he could not hurt Megumi if he became unable to control his fighting again.

=== Yuko Ozawa ===
Voiced by: Aimi (Japanese); Kayli Mills (English)

Yuko Ozawa (小沢 優子, Ozawa Yūko) was Yuji's old classmate from Junior High School until she moved to Tokyo. She was a shy and quiet girl who was not confident with her physical appearance, but one day she overheard Yuji talking kindly of her, which made Yuko develop a crush on him. In the present day, she has lost weight and grown taller. When she saw Yuji was also in Tokyo, she asked Nobara about him, believing she has a chance with Yuji now with her new appearance. She later realized she was not so different from the people she did not like when Yuji could still recognize her even with her big change. She appears in the epilogue reuniting with Yuji.

=== Saori ===
Voiced by: Rie Suegara (Japanese); Cristina Vee (English)

Saori (沙織) is a young girl who moved to Nobara's village from Tokyo. Nobara greatly admired Saori and was even influenced by her personality. Nobara described her as a kind and beautiful girl, but was ostracized by the village because of her upbringing. She was forced to move back to Tokyo, leaving an upset Nobara behind. Presently, she is seen working in an office setting, wondering what Nobara is doing.

=== Fumi ===
Voiced by: Azusa Aoi (Japanese); Emi Lo (English)

Fumi (ふみ) is Nobara's childhood friend from her village. They often play Super Smash Bros. together in her house. Years later, Nobara left to attend Jujutsu High in Tokyo; while at the train to say their goodbyes, Nobara told Fumi to find her way out of the village.

=== Jin Itadori ===
Voiced by: Toshiyuki Toyonaga (Japanese); Alan Lee (English)

Jin Itadori (虎杖 仁, Itadori Jin) was the father of Yuji, who disappeared when Yuji was a child. Wasuke wanted to tell Yuji about his father in his death bed but Yuji did not wish to hear it.

=== Kaori Itadori ===
Voiced by: Megumi Hayashibara (Japanese); Allegra Clark (English)

Kaori Itadori (虎杖 香織, Itadori Kaori) was the late wife of Jin Itadori and the mother of Yuji Itadori. Little is known about her other than her body was taken over by Kenjaku when she died, and Kenjaku is actually the one who gave birth to Yuji in her body. Her Cursed Technique, Antigravity System (反重力機構, Anchigurabiti Shisutemu) allowed her to negate gravity when used. Kenjaku primarily used a Cursed Technique reversal of this ability in the fight against Yuki and Choso, allowing them to intensify the gravitational pull around them.

=== Takeru ===
Voiced by: Mayumi Shintani

Takeru (タケル) is a small anthropomorphic dog-looking cursed corpse created by Masamichi Yaga. He was created from the soul information of Kusakabe's nephew and resides in a forest alongside many other cursed corpses.

=== Cyrus Veil ===
Cyrus Veil (サイラス ヴェイル, Sairasu Bueiru) is the Under Secretary for the United States Office of Energy and Environment. When Kenjaku shows up at the White House, he is manipulated into following his plans. As a consultant to the President, it was Cyrus who convinced the government to coordinate with Kenjaku's plan to abduct Jujutsu Sorcerers from Japan to use for energy research.

=== Garry K. Johnson ===
Garry K. Johnson (ギャリー ケー ジョンソン, Gyarī Kē Jonson) is the Lieutenant General of the U.S. Army and the Commander of its Joint Special Operations unit. He is leading the military operation to abduct Jujutsu Sorcerers from Japan under orders from the President after Kenjaku was able to manipulate them.

== Light novel characters ==
=== Tanabe ===
Tanabe is an auxiliary manager from Kyoto Prefectural Jujutsu High School. He oversees the missions handled by the second-year students, Mai Zen'in, Kokichi Muta, and Kasumi Miwa. He first appears in the series' second light novel, Jujutsu Kaisen: Yoake no Ibara Michi.

=== Kairi Minato ===
Kairi Minato (湊 海里, Minato Kairi) is a character from the series' first light novel, Jujutsu Kaisen: Iku Natsu to Kaeru Aki. Set during Yuji's time in hiding and secret training after being declared dead, Yuji encounters Minato in a park. The boy unknowingly manifested a Cursed Spirit that appears in front of his adoptive parent's home at night. Yuji ultimately defeated it after a lesson from Gojo.

=== Yu Makimura ===
Yu Makimura (牧村 ゆう, Makimura Yū) is a character from the second light novel. She is a young girl who looks up to Mai Zen'in after seeing her exorcise a Cursed Spirit. She became a 'window' for Jujutsu Tech, a person who informs the school of cursed-related activities. She has the ability to see Cursed Spirits, but does not have the necessary brain structure that a sorcerer has.

=== Tsurube Kaya ===
Tsurube Kaya (鶴瓶 香弥, Kaya Tsurube) is the antagonist from the second light novel. He is a Curse User who has a Curse Words Technique. Similar to the Inumaki clan's Cursed Speech, albeit it is much weaker and requires an amplifier such as a talisman to strengthen its effects. Tsurube was able to use his technique on Nobara, making her believe that he was a talent scout. Tsurube was selling information regarding the Jujutsu High School but was defeated by Nobara after freeing herself from his Cursed Words and using a makeshift straw doll to activate her technique.

=== Koizumi ===
Koizumi is a Curse User from the second light novel, working for Tsurube. He was defeated by Inumaki and Nobara.

== Video game characters ==
=== Saki Rindo ===
Voiced by: Rina Satō

Saki Rindo (竜胆 サキ, Rindō Saki) is a sorcerer and a first-year student at Fukuoka Prefectural Jujutsu High School. She has a boastful personality due to her delinquent past before awakening her ability to use Cursed Energy. Her Cursed Technique, Catastrophe Reversal Curse (災禍転呪, Saikatenju), allows her to convert pain into Cursed Energy, eliminating the sensation of pain entirely. She appears in the game Jujutsu Kaisen: Phantom Parade as a playable character.

=== Kaito Yuki ===
Voiced by: Koutaro Nishiyama

Kaito Yuki (結木 海斗, Yūki Kaito) is a first-year student and sorcerer at Fukuoka Prefectural Jujutsu High School. He values discipline highly and is hostile toward Itadori because he believes that Itadori's existence goes against the rules of jujutsu. Kaito's Cursed Technique, Prayer Formation Technique (祈陣呪法, Kijin Juhō), activates a barrier that forces those inside it to fight, amplifying the Cursed Energy within. The effects of this barrier do not apply to Kaito. He appears in Jujutsu Kaisen: Phantom Parade as a playable character. He appears in Jujutsu Kaisen: Phantom Parade as a playable character.

=== Kensuke Nagino ===
Voiced by: Rikiya Koyama

Kensuke Nagino (奈木野 健介, Nagino Kensuke) is the principal of Fukuoka Prefectural Jujutsu High School. He has a bold personality and is a confident individual. He appears in Jujutsu Kaisen: Phantom Parade.

=== Rozetsu ===
Voiced by: Jun Fukuyama

Rozetsu (朧絶) is a Special Grade Cursed Spirit. Like other Cursed Spirits, he believes that Cursed Spirits are superior to humans and that humans do not deserve to use Cursed Energy. He has made it his life's work to steal Cursed Techniques from people that he likes. Despite being a Cursed Spirit, Rozetsu is highly intelligent and speaks politely. Rozetsu's Cursed Technique, Cursed Technique Snatch (奸骨奪胎, Kankotsu Dattai), allows him to recreate other Cursed Techniques if he fulfills three conditions: he must witness the Cursed Technique, touch the target, and obtain the target's blood or cursed energy. He appears in Jujutsu Kaisen: Phantom Parade.

== Reception ==
Critical assessment of the cast varied by story arc. Karen Lu of Yale University noted that protagonist Yuji Itadori subverted the typical stubborn young male anime trope by quickly understanding he could not save everyone. She praised the series for demonstrating that his strength required genuine suffering, finding this dynamic both inspiring and sobering. The exploration of Satoru Gojo and Suguru Geto's youth in the anime's second season was praised by IGN for their dynamic, though the site found Gojo's powers overly complicated and considered Geto the more important focus of the arc. Gojo's character gained significant popularity on social media. Following the adaptation of his youth flashbacks, Ana Diaz of Polygon observed that fan-made doujinshi featuring Gojo and Geto went viral. Olive St. Sauver of But Why Tho? likened the friendship between Megumi Fushiguro and Yuji Itadori to that of Asta and Yuno in Black Clover, noting a mutual care and enthusiasm for the other's success where the drive to surpass stemmed from healthy competition rather than envy. During the Culling Games arc, however, Fushiguro's role was received negatively after he became a vessel for Sukuna and was largely absent from the narrative. Critics considered his character wasted potential, a sentiment amplified by his subsequent rejection of rescue following Sukuna's actions.

The battle between the Zen'in sisters, Maki and Mai, earned praise for its animation and exploration of Maki's past. The Fandom Post called Maki "the star of the show" for overshadowing her enemies with a cocky personality, arguing she surpassed Nobara Kugisaki in presence. Comic Book Resources stated that Maki and Nobara "crushed" societal expectations, though it noted the handling of the sisters' feud left a bittersweet feeling as the Zen'in family conflict was not fully explained. Chingy Nea of Polygon praised the antagonist Sukuna as a "cruel and emotionless sadist" whose early killing of Yuji helped the series "feign predictability." Joshua Fox of Screen Rant argued that Jujutsu Kaisen did not handle its female characters favorably. While he praised Nobara's return in a late chapter, he criticized the trope of sidelining a female character to facilitate male character development. A review of the anime's second season on Anime News Network (ANN) criticized the portrayal of Nobara's apparent death, finding her flashback lacking substance compared to Kento Nanami's death and comparing her fate to the "women in refrigerators" trope for its shock value to Yuji's arc. Conversely, ANN praised Maki's fight against the Zen'in clan in the Culling Games, comparing it to the Kill Bill films and lauding the animation. Despite her survival being revealed in the Shinjuku arc, Epic Dope lamented that Nobara's character was wasted due to her prolonged absence after the Shibuya incident and a lack of development or explanation for her return.

The release of the prequel Jujutsu Kaisen 0 prompted critics to compare Yuji to its protagonist, Yuta Okkotsu. Debates emerged over which character was more relatable or original, given their divergent characterizations despite similar narrative roles. The Los Angeles Times compared Yuta's symbiotic relationship with the Cursed Spirit Rika to that of Venom from Marvel Comics, due to Yuta's need to control her power. Real Sound praised the bonds between jujutsu sorcerers, highlighting how Maki's training and friendship with Yuta added depth to the main narrative. In an academic text, Hiroko Sakata drew parallels between Yuta and Rika and the mythological figures Hiruko, the oni Katako, and the child K, citing their story as a modernized Japanese myth. Sakata further compared them to Tanjiro Kamado and Nezuko Kamado from Demon Slayer: Kimetsu no Yaiba, as both narratives involve controlling an oni-like element to become fighters.

The climax of Jujutsu Kaisen 0, in which Gojo kills Geto, confused some viewers as Geto appears alive in the subsequent television series. The anime did not explain this discrepancy, with sources noting that the manga clarifies Geto's survival was due to his body being possessed by the ancient sorcerer Kenjaku. Lauren Tidmarsh theorized that Geto may have retained some consciousness, citing a scene where his arm attacks his own possessed body. Real Sound writer Īchi Narimare praised the complex story involving Geto and Gojo, including the twist of Kenjaku's possession.

Game Rant concluded that Yuji was overshadowed as a protagonist by Gojo and that Yuta had a more notable character arc, arguing the main trio's potential was wasted in favor of side characters. ANN agreed, stating that Yuta's story and Gojo's backstory were the best arcs due to their self-contained nature, which the main series failed to replicate. Following the series' epilogue, GameRant noted fan satisfaction with the implication that Yuta and Maki had formed a family, a development long anticipated by readers.
