= Disciples of the 36th Chamber =

1985 Hong Kong film by Lau Kar-leung

- The Hong Kong film poster
- Directed by: Lau Kar-leung
- Written by: Lau Kar-leung
- Produced by: Mona Fong; Run Run Shaw
- Starring: Hsiao Ho; Gordon Liu; Lau Kar-leung
- Cinematography: Cho On-Sun
- Edited by: Chiang Hsing-Lung; Lee Yim-Hoi
- Distributed by: Shaw Brothers Studio
- Release date: 17 May 1985 (Hong Kong)
- Running time: 93 minutes
- Countries: Hong Kong; China
- Languages: Cantonese; Mandarin

Disciples of the 36th Chamber (霹靂十傑, Pi li shi jie, Disciples of the Master Killer or Master Killer III) is a 1985 Shaw Brothers Studio Hong Kong martial arts film comedy film written, directed and choreographed Lau Kar-leung. It is the third in a loose trilogy of films that began with The 36th Chamber of Shaolin (1978) and was followed by Return to the 36th Chamber (1980). In Disciples, the action is focused on Hsiao Ho, who portrays legendary martial artist Fong Sai-Yuk. Gordon Liu, a constant in the 36th Chamber series, reprises his role from The 36th Chamber of Shaolin as the monk San Te.

== Plot ==
Teen-aged Fong Sai-Yuk is a gifted martial artist but he is a poor student at school and a constant troublemaker, even though the school is run by his father. Powerful Manchu officials in Guangdong are achieving hegemony over the native Han Chinese population and threaten to shut the school down.

Sai-Yuk exacerbates matters when he picks a fight with the leader of the Manchus. In order to save her family's honor and keep the school open, Sai-Yuk's mother makes a bargain with the Shaolin monk San Te for her incorrigible son to be given refuge in the temple's 36th Chamber, which is a training hall for non-monks. However, Sai-Yuk is too full of pride and lacks respect for authority, so he continues his trouble-making ways.

Sai-Yuk constantly goes out of the Shaolin Temple at night, while his fellow students are asleep. He regularly visits the town, governed by Manchu officials, and then boasts about his adventures to his fellow pupils. During one of these night excursions, Sai-Yuk finds himself in the town where some festive celebrations are going on. Intrigued, Sai-Yuk climbs a wall to see the festivities and dance. He is seen and reprimanded by one of the Manchu officials, who orders him to climb down. When Sai-Yuk ignores him, he orders a few of the Manchu fighters to teach him a lesson.

Sai-Yuk, out of his pride and with the Kung-Fu skills attained at Shaolin, over-powers all the Manchu fighters with ease. Seeing this, the head Manchu decides to get information about the Shaolin Temple by befriending Sai-Yuk for the time being, promising his fellow Manchus that he will kill Sai-Yuk once he has taken all the information and Kung-Fu knowledge from him.

Sai-Yuk, in his innocence, falls into the trap and inadvertently starts sharing Shaolin secrets with the Manchu on a regular basis. Sai-Yuk starts visiting the hostile town daily, where he is repeatedly honored to make him believe that the Manchu are actually very nice and gentle. But every time Sai-Yuk visits the town, the Manchus try to dig something new out of him - be it life within Shaolin Temple, the number of students and teachers inside the Temple or their Kung-Fu techniques and skills in general.

Sai-Yuk is impressed by the Manchu hospitality, and keeps on giving details about Shaolin. Finally, at the Manchu leader's request and impressed by his shrewd fake friendship, Sai-Yuk persuades all his fellow pupils to go the Manchu town for the celebration of his daughter's marriage. The Manchu leader had a devious motive behind this, as he had planned to poison all the pupils to remove the threat of the Shaolin temple's monks once and for all.

San-Te, the abbot and teacher of the 36th chamber and instructor of Sai-Yuk, becomes suspicious and tries to stop Sai-Yuk. When he fails, he decides to go to the wedding in order to save his pupils and show the true colors of the Manchus to all. A fierce fight between the Shaolin students and the Manchus erupts upon them realizing that the Manchu actually wanted to poison all the Shaolin students.

The movie ends when Sai-Yuk spits his poisoned blood in the Manchu leader's mouth, making him swallow the poison instead. San-Te brings all his pupils, including Sai-Yuk, back to Shaolin safely, and their training continues. Sai-Yuk has learned his lesson and mended his ways to become more humble and less chaotic.

== Cast ==
- Hsiao Ho as Fong Sai-Yuk
- Gordon Liu as San Te
- Lily Li as Sai-Yuk's mother
- Jason Pai Piao as Governor
- Lau Kar-leung as Manchu chief
- Hoi Sang Lee as Tiger Lei
