= The 36th Chamber of Shaolin =

1978 Hong Kong film by Lau Kar-leung

- Theatrical release poster

Chinese name
- Traditional Chinese: 少林三十六房
- Simplified Chinese: 少林三十六房
Transcriptions
Standard Mandarin
- Hanyu Pinyin: Shǎolín sānshíliù fáng
Yue: Cantonese
- Jyutping: Siu^{3} Lam^{4} saam^{1} sap^{6} luk^{6} fong^{4}
- Directed by: Lau Kar-leung
- Written by: Ni Kuang
- Produced by: Mona Fong; Run Run Shaw
- Starring: Gordon Liu; Lo Lieh
- Cinematography: Arthur Wong Ngok-Tai
- Edited by: Geung Hing Lung; Li Yen-Hai
- Music by: Chen Yung-Yu
- Distributed by: Shaw Brothers Studio
- Release date: February 2, 1978
- Running time: 115 minutes
- Country: Hong Kong
- Languages: Cantonese; Mandarin

The 36th Chamber of Shaolin (Chinese: 少林三十六房, also released as The Master Killer and Shaolin Master Killer) is a 1978 Hong Kong martial arts film produced by Shaw Brothers Studio, directed by Lau Kar-leung from a screenplay written by Ni Kuang, starring Gordon Liu and Lo Lieh. The film follows a highly fictionalized version of San Te (Liu), a legendary Shaolin martial arts disciple, who lived in the Qing dynasty during the 17th-century.

The 36th Chamber of Shaolin is widely considered to be one of the greatest kung fu films and a turning point in its director's and star's careers. It was followed by Return to the 36th Chamber (1980), which was more comedic in presentation and featured Gordon Liu as the new main character with another actor in the smaller role of San Te, and Disciples of the 36th Chamber (1985).

== Plot ==
A young student named Liu Yu-de is drawn by his activist teacher into the local rebellion against the Manchu government. The government officials, headed by the brutal General Tien Ta, however, quickly discover and suppress the uprising, liquidating the school and killing the students' friends and family members. Yu-de decides to seek vengeance and liberation for the people, and heads for the Shaolin temple to learn kung fu.

Wounded by Manchu henchmen during an escape, Yu-de reaches the temple and seeks sanctuary. Initially the monks reject him, since he is an outsider, but the chief abbot has mercy on the young man and lets him stay. One year later, Yu-de - now known as San Te - begins his martial arts training in the temple's 35 chambers, in each of which the temple's novices are trained in one aspect of the kung fu fighting arts.

The chambers shown in San Te's training are as follows (names of the chambers, if given, are from the subtitles and in quotation marks):

- "35th Chamber": This is considered the highest-level chamber, representing enlightenment and wisdom, where the monks are reciting the Buddhist sutras from memory. During the session, the head master will ask random monks a verse in the sutras and they must answer correctly or else they be asked to stand aside. According to head master, this chamber's purpose is to make the monks master the sutras properly to enable them unlock the power of Chi, which enables them perform devastating Kung Fu technique. When the head master of the chamber tells San Te to leave due to his ignorance of the sutras, San Te protests, only for the head master to knock him down from a distance using Chi. San Te flees the chamber, and agrees to start at the lowest level. This is also the chamber San Te is never able to reach by the end of the movie.
- "First Chamber": This chamber teaches lightness and balance. Monks in training must jump on a bundle of sticks floating in a pool of water to reach the dining hall. Falling in the water requires the monk to dry his clothes off before entering the dining hall (by which time the food is all gone). San-Te trains hard to master the skill by balancing himself on rolling barrels and eventually succeed in crossing the bundle of sticks with just one leg. He is then promoted to train in the second chamber.
- Third Chamber: This chamber trains arm strength. Monks must carry water in buckets with blades attached to their arms to keep the arms held straight out. The chamber also serves as the monastery's laundry to incorporate daily chores into the training.
- Fourth Chamber: This chamber trains wrist strength. Monks must strike a large broze bell with a very long weighted bamboo pole to the rhythm of the head master's striking his wooden fish while using the bottom end of the pole. San Te struggles to lift the pole at first so he starts with closed distance of the pole and gradually decreasing the distance of the pole until he is able to strike the gong with the bottom end of the pole.
- Fifth Chamber: This chamber trains eyesight. Monks must follow a light without turning their heads, or risk getting burned by large sticks of incense. The final test will be for the trainees to strike the pillars with mirrors that reflect light from the candle at fast speed.
- Sixth Chamber: This chamber trains head strength. Monks must headbutt their way through a corridor of sandbags and then place incense sticks on an altar while suffering from the concussion effect of the headbutts. This is the last conditioning chamber and in order to pass, one must remain stable after headbutting their way through the sandbags. After passing this chamber, San Te is allowed to learn kung fu techniques. Eventually San Te succeeds and is praised for completing all the basic trainings in less than two years.
- Seventh Chamber: This is the chamber for training empty-hand forms and techniques.
- "Leg Chamber": This chamber trains kicking techniques.
- "Sword Chamber": This chamber trains broadsword techniques.
- Ninth Chamber: This chamber trains staff techniques.

San Te advances more rapidly than any previous student, reaching the rank of deputy overseer within the space of six years. Challenged by the monastery's Discipline Chief, who thinks him unfit for his role, San Te has several exhibition matches with him, only to be beaten each time. However, after inventing the three section staff, San Te finally prevails and gains the chief abbot's permission to become overseer of one of the chambers.

When San Te professes that he wants to create a new chamber where he can train ordinary people in the basics of kung fu so they can defend themselves against their oppressors, the temple officially banishes him in a surreptitious way to allow him to carry out his mission. He returns to the outside world, namely to his hometown, and assists the people, gathering several young men who loyally follow him and become his first students. Before the political revolution where his aspirations reach completion, he is forced into conflict with Tien Ta. A fierce duel ensues, where San Te is victorious. Finally, he returns to the Shaolin temple, where he establishes the 36th chamber, a special martial arts class for laypeople to learn kung fu.

== Cast ==
- Gordon Liu as Liu Yu-de/San Te (Chinese: 劉裕德／三德; pinyin: Liú Yùdé / Sān Dé; Jyutping: Lau4 Jyu6 Dak1 ／ Saam1 Dak1)
- Lo Lieh as General Tien Ta (天達; Tiān Dá; Tin1 Daat6)
- Wilson Tong Wai-shing as Lord Tang san-yao (唐三要; Táng Sānyào; Tong4 Saam1 Jiu3)
- John Cheung Ng-long as General Cheung (張; Zhāng; Zoeng1)
- Henry Yu Yang as Hung Hsi-kuan (洪熙官; Hóng xīguān; Hung4 Hei1 Gun1)
- Wu Hang-sheng as Tung Chien-ching (童千斤; Tóng Qiānjīn; Tung4 Cin1 Gan1)
- Norman Chui as Lu Ah-tsai (陆阿采; Lù' ācǎi; Luk6 Aa3 Coi2)
- Wong Yue as Rice Miller Six (舂米六; Chōngmǐ Liù; Zung1 Mai5 Luk6)
- Woo Wang-taat as Shaolin Abbot
- Lee Hoi-sang as Disciplinary Abbot
- Chiang Han as 1st Chamber Abbot
- Lui Tat as 3rd Chamber Abbot
- Chan Shen as 4th Chamber Abbot
- Chiang Nan as 5th Chamber Abbot
- Ai Tung-kua as 6th Chamber Abbot
- Yuen Siu-tien as 7th Chamber Abbot
- Chan Lung as 9th Chamber Abbot
- Frankie Wei Hung as Master Ho
- Lau Kar-wing as General Yin
- Hon Kwok-choi as Lin Chen
- Chen Szu-chia as Yien Pin
- Wang Ching-ho as Liu Yu-de's father

== Historical basis ==
While the film is loosely based on the historically documented figure of San Te—a martial arts master who lived in the 17th century and taught outside the Shaolin Temple to aid the rebellion against the Manchu—the film takes significant creative liberties. Most notably, the film depicts San Te as the inventor of the three-section staff, which is a fictional element created specifically for the movie's narrative.

== Critical reception ==
The 36th Chamber of Shaolin received critical acclaim and is widely considered to be one of the greatest kung fu films ever made and a highly influential entry in the genre.

According to the Harvard Film Archive, the film is an "exhilarating rendition of the legendary dissemination of the Shaolin martial arts" and an "absorbing account of [an] initiation into the vaunted Shaolin style, ... depicted here [as] an inner voyage of discovery".

In 2014, Time Out polled several film critics, directors, actors and stunt actors to list their top action films; The 36th Chamber of Shaolin was listed in 22nd place on this list.

In 2021, Complex ranked The 36th Chamber of Shaolin number 5 in a list of the "24 Best Kung Fu Movies of All Time".

== Home media ==
The 36th Chamber of Shaolin was released on VHS as early as 1993, under the title Master Killer. It was released on DVD in February 2000 by Crash Cinema Media as Shaolin Master Killer. In 2007, the film was released on DVD by The Weinstein Company's Asian label, Dragon Dynasty, as The 36th Chamber of Shaolin. In March 2010, Dragon Dynasty and Celestial Pictures released the film on Blu-ray.

On 6 December 2022, Arrow Video released The 36th Chamber of Shaolin on Blu-ray as part of the Shawscope Volume Two boxed set.

== In popular culture ==
The Wu-Tang Clan's debut album Enter the Wu-Tang (36 Chambers) got the latter part of its name from the film. In addition, Wu-Tang Clan member Masta Killa takes his name from one of the film's alternate titles. Wu-Tang member and producer RZA also samples the film on Ol' Dirty Bastard's Return to the 36 Chambers: The Dirty Version ("Intro") and Method Man's Tical ("Meth vs. Chef", "I Get My Thang in Action", "Tical").

In 2008's Kung Fu Panda, the Training Hall sequence was inspired by The 36th Chamber of Shaolin.

A clip from the movie appears in a 2023 animated movie Teenage Mutant Ninja Turtles: Mutant Mayhem in which the title characters were trained in martial arts by their father figure Master Splinter by showing them various video clips containing martial arts, including from other classic Shaw Brothers films.
