= San Te =

Shaolin martial arts fighter

San Te or San-De (Chinese: 三德) monk was a Shaolin martial arts disciple who trained under monk Zhi Shan. The title San-De means "Three Harmonies" or "Three Virtues". He lived in the early 18th century and resided at the Xichan Monastery after leaving the main Shaolin Monastery.

San Te has been depicted in several Hong Kong-produced films. The Shaw Brothers Studio produced three films starring Gordon Liu: The 36th Chamber of Shaolin (1978, also known as Master Killer and Shaolin Master Killer), Return to the 36th Chamber (1980), and Disciples of the 36th Chamber (1985).
