= Yurika Hino =

Japanese actress and voice actress (born 1963)

Yurika Hino (日野由利加, Hino Yurika; born January 16, 1963) is a Japanese actress and voice actress. She was part of the Theatre Company Subaru from 1987 to 2011. Hino dubs Japanese for Western films, including roles for Famke Janssen (X-Men: The Last Stand), Winona Ryder, Carrie-Anne Moss (the Matrix trilogy), and Eva Longoria. Hino also voices roles for anime and video games. Originally from Yokohama, Kanagawa Prefecture, she is affiliated with Office Anemone.

== Early life and education ==
Yurika Hino was born on January 16, 1963 in Yokohama, Kanagawa Prefecture. When she started skipping school during her freshman year at Kanagawa Prefectural Shimizugaoka High School, her mother realized that her daughter's situation was not good. It was decided that Yurika needed to find some way to find release. Hino saw an ad for the Himawari Theater Company in the newspaper and joined the company. She then modeled for a junior high school magazine and appeared as an extra in a TV drama.

Hino also loved children, however, and wanted to become a nursery school teacher; her dream was to be the singing sister on the TV show Okaasan to Issho (Mother and Child Together). However, due to her truancy and negligible grades, she gave up on the idea of becoming a teacher. At the time she was wondering what to do, her mother recommended Bunka Gakuin, which she had always admired. Hino visited the school and found the students to be playing around, which she thought was good, so she enrolled in the theater course in the school's literature department. After graduating, she attended the Subaru Theater School.

== Career ==
Yurika joined the Theatre Company Subaru in 1987, leaving in December 2011. She frequently dubs Western films, including roles for Famke Janssen (X-Men: The Last Stand), Winona Ryder, Carrie-Anne Moss (the Matrix trilogy), and Eva Longoria (Desperate Housewives). Yurika often voices adult female and mother roles in anime and video games. She is still active as a stage actress.

After working for Office PAC, Yurika joined Office Anemone on April 1, 2025. In recent years, in addition to her own acting career, she has been devoting herself to mentoring young voice actors.

== Personal life ==
Rumi Ochiai was her junior at the same high school (Kanagawa Prefectural Shimizugaoka High School) and also a member of the Theatre Company Subaru.

Hino lists her hobbies as spending time with her pet dog.
