= Shinpo Matayoshi =

Shinpo Matayoshi (又吉 眞豊; 1921–1997) was a martial artist who lived in Naha, Okinawa, Japan, during the 20th century.

== Biography ==
He was the son of the Okinawan martial arts master Shinko Matayoshi. The Matayoshi family has long been associated with the martial arts and can trace its lineage back over many generations. An early ancestor of Matayoshi Shinpo was a strategic martial arts instructor and an officer of the Ryukyu royal court until the last days of the shogunate.

Matayoshi Shinpo learned martial arts from his father from his birth until his mid-twenties. He learned several kata associated with Naha-Te in his early childhood.

Despite being a well-respected expert in Okinawan karate, Matayoshio is perhaps best known for his practice of Kobudo.

He started a dojo in the 1960s in memory of his father and called it the Kodokan (光道館). From the Kodokan he began to teach a wide variety of traditional weapons associated with Okinawan peasants.

Matayoshi continued to learn martial arts from a man affectionally know in Okinawa as Go Ken Ki (Wu Xian Gui). Go Ken Ki was from China and practiced various styles of southern kung fu. It is from Go Ken Ki that Matayoshi learned many of the Chinese forms that he later became famous for demonstrating.

Many of the weapons used in Matayoshi Kobudo have their origin in China. The staff, Ssai, tonfa, nunchaku, sansetsukon, suruchin, hoe, sword and shield are all weapons regularly used and practiced in Chinese kung fu. These weapons are particularly prevalent in the Hung Gar tradition. It may be that Hun Gar has had a strong influence on Matayoshi and his Kobudo. Other weapons such as the oar, the fishing spear and the sickles have their origins in Okinawa.

Students of Matayoshi are found all over the world and they continue to practice his style of Kobudo known collectively as "Matayoshi Kobudo". Some of his more respected later students include Gakiya Yoshiaki and Yamashiro Kenichi.

It was the ambition of Matayoshi that his art of Kobudo should be practiced all over the world and to that end he travelled extensively teaching his art. Today there are approximately 2,000 dojos worldwide that practice Matayoshi Kobudo thanks to his legacy.
