= Shinko Matayoshi =

Okinawan karateka

Shinko Matayoshi (又吉 眞光, Matayoshi Shinkō; 1888–1945) was one of the best-known masters of Okinawa Kobudo Matayoshi Kobudo.

== Life ==
Born in 1888 in Naha-shi at Senburu, he studied the bo, eku, kama and sai under the direction of Master Shokuho Agena. He later studied the tonfa and nunchaku with Master Irei. From 1911 until 1915 Matayoshi lived in Manchuria where he studied Chinese martial arts. In 1921 he gave a demonstration of his skills during Prince Hirohito's visit to Okinawa. He later traveled to Shanghai, and returned to Okinawa around 1935 where he died in 1945.

Shinko Matayoshi was succeeded as Soke (headmaster) of Matayoshi kobudo by his son, Shinpo Matayoshi (1921-1997).
